= OSS 117: Lost in Rio =

2009 film by Michel Hazanavicius

- Theatrical release poster
- French: OSS 117 : Rio ne répond plus
- Directed by: Michel Hazanavicius
- Written by: Jean-François Halin; Michel Hazanavicius
- Based on: OSS 117 character by Jean Bruce
- Produced by: Éric Altmayer; Nicolas Altmeyer
- Starring: Jean Dujardin; Louise Monot; Rüdiger Vogler; Alex Lutz; Reem Kherici
- Cinematography: Guillaume Schiffman
- Edited by: Reynald Bertrand
- Music by: Ludovic Bource
- Production companies: Mandarin Cinéma; Gaumont; M6 Films
- Distributed by: Gaumont
- Release date: 15 April 2009 (France)
- Running time: 101 minutes
- Country: France
- Language: French
- Budget: €23.4 million ($26.8 million)
- Box office: $21.9 million

OSS 117: Lost in Rio (French: OSS 117 : Rio ne répond plus) is a 2009 French spy comedy film co-written and directed by Michel Hazanavicius. It is a sequel to Hazanavicius' OSS 117: Cairo, Nest of Spies (2006), and sees Jean Dujardin reprising his role as French secret agent Hubert Bonisseur de La Bath / OSS 117. Set in 1967, Lost in Rio sees OSS 117 sent to Brazil in order to retrieve a microfilm list of French Nazi sympathizers, only to once again unknowingly set foot into a bigger international intrigue.

Like the first film, Lost in Rio is based on the OSS 117 character from the novels by Jean Bruce, but acts as a parody rather than a faithful adaptation. The original title literally translates to OSS 117: Rio Doesn't Respond Anymore, a reference to the 1932 film F.P.1 Doesn't Respond. Lost in Rio received praise for its direction, humour, dialogues and performances. A sequel, OSS 117: From Africa with Love, directed by Nicolas Bedos, was released in 2021.

== Plot ==
The film opens with a ski chalet party sequence in Gstaad where Hubert Bonisseur de La Bath aka OSS 117 is entertaining a Chinese countess. The party is attacked by Red Chinese gunmen working for a Mr. Lee and everyone but Hubert and the Countess are killed, with Hubert comically killing some of his own guests by accident. Returning to SDECE headquarters, Hubert is assigned to deliver a blackmail payment of 50,000 new Francs to Professor Von Zimmel, a Nazi who escaped to South America and has a microfilm list of French Nazi sympathizers.

Once in Rio, Hubert is attacked at various times by relatives of Mr. Lee's gunmen, encounters a foul-mouthed American Felix Leiter-type CIA agent Bill Tremendous, the femme fatale Carlotta, Professor Von Zimmel's luchador enforcers and eventually Mossad agents intent on bringing Professor Von Zimmel back to Israel for trial. OSS 117 teams up with Dolorès Koulechov, a beautiful Israeli Army Colonel to bring Von Zimmel to Israel in the manner of Adolf Eichmann. Their lead to Von Zimmel is his son who is now a hippie.

Throughout the film the main character has two main romantic interests. The first is a mysterious beauty Carlotta (Reem Kherici). The second is Israeli Army officer, Dolorès Koulechov, who spends most of the film exasperated at OSS 117's misogynistic, racist, colonial tendencies and has no interest in the main character, but warms up to him in the end. When asked by de La Bath why Koulechov does not like the dictatorial Brazilian military government of the time, she lists its examples of totalitarianism that the puzzled de La Bath finds the same as the France of Charles de Gaulle.

- Do you know what a dictatorship is ? It's when people are communists, when they are cold with gray hats and boots with zippers. That's a dictatorship !
- Then, what do you call a country with a military leader controlling everything, a secret police, a single TV channel with every information controlled by the state ?
- I call that "France", Miss. "General De Gaulle's France..."

Throughout the film, de La Bath is forced to engage with hippies, exploration of sexuality, gender roles in different belief systems, and his personal convictions about society and prejudice.

== Cast ==
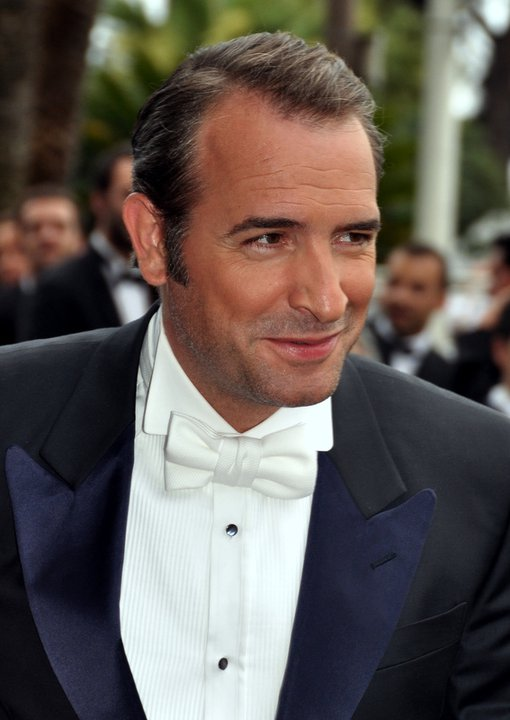
Jean Dujardin, who plays the protagonist of the series, Hubert Bonisseur de La Bath

- Jean Dujardin as Hubert Bonisseur de La Bath, alias OSS 117
- Louise Monot as Dolorès Koulechov
- Rüdiger Vogler as Professor Von Zimmel
- Alex Lutz as Heinrich
- Reem Kherici as Carlotta
- Pierre Bellemare as Lesignac
- Serge Hazanavicius as Staman
- Laurent Capelluto as Kutner

== Background ==
The film is a sequel to the original OSS 117: Cairo, Nest of Spies released in 2006. It attracted 260,000 viewers more than the opening of OSS 117: Cairo, Nest of Spies. The only returning character is Lesignac, de La Bath's superior. In the first movie Lesignac was played by Claude Brosset, due to his death, the character was played by Pierre Bellemare. Michael Hazanavicius suggested Jacques Chirac for playing Armand Lesignac, but he rejected it.

== Parody ==
The film is a continuation of the OSS 117 series of Eurospy films from the 1950s and 1960s, which were in turn based on a series of novels by Jean Bruce, a prolific French popular writer. The main character in the OSS 117 series is a secret agent of the SDECE, Hubert Bonisseur de La Bath, also known by his code name OSS 117. The character is played by Jean Dujardin.

The films parodies the original André Hunebelle OSS 117 series and other conventional spy and Eurospy films such as Se Tutte le Donne del Mondo with its sequence on top of the Christ the Redeemer statue, and most noticeably the early James Bond series right down to the cinematography, art direction and costumes of the 1960s–1970s. For example, driving scenes are all filmed with obvious rear projection and camera movements are simple, and avoid the three-dimensional Steadicam and crane movements that are easily accomplished today.

The then-popular multi-dynamic image technique of displaying several panes with partial and full repetition of images, (popularized by Steve McQueen's 1968 film The Thomas Crown Affair), is employed in several key sequences, including in the introductory scene with Dolorès Koulechov. The film also pointedly parodies Alfred Hitchcock's Vertigo and North by Northwest; de La Bath's clothing is inspired by Paul Newman's in Harper and the set furnishings evoke Dean Martin's Matt Helm films.

The film opens and closes with Dean Martin songs and reuses footage from The Greatest Show on Earth (1952) and Furia à Bahia pour OSS 117 (OSS 117: Mission for a Killer) (1965) and "Fun in Acapulco" (1963).

== Reception ==
On Rotten Tomatoes, the film has an approval rating of 75% based on reviews from 52 critics. The site's critical consensus reads "Led by another appealing performance from Jean Dujardin, this sequel offers more absurdly fun action -- and more politically incorrect humor -- for fans of '60s spy films." On Metacritic, the film has a score of 58 out of 100, indicating "Mixed or average reviews".
