= Natacha Lindinger =

French actress

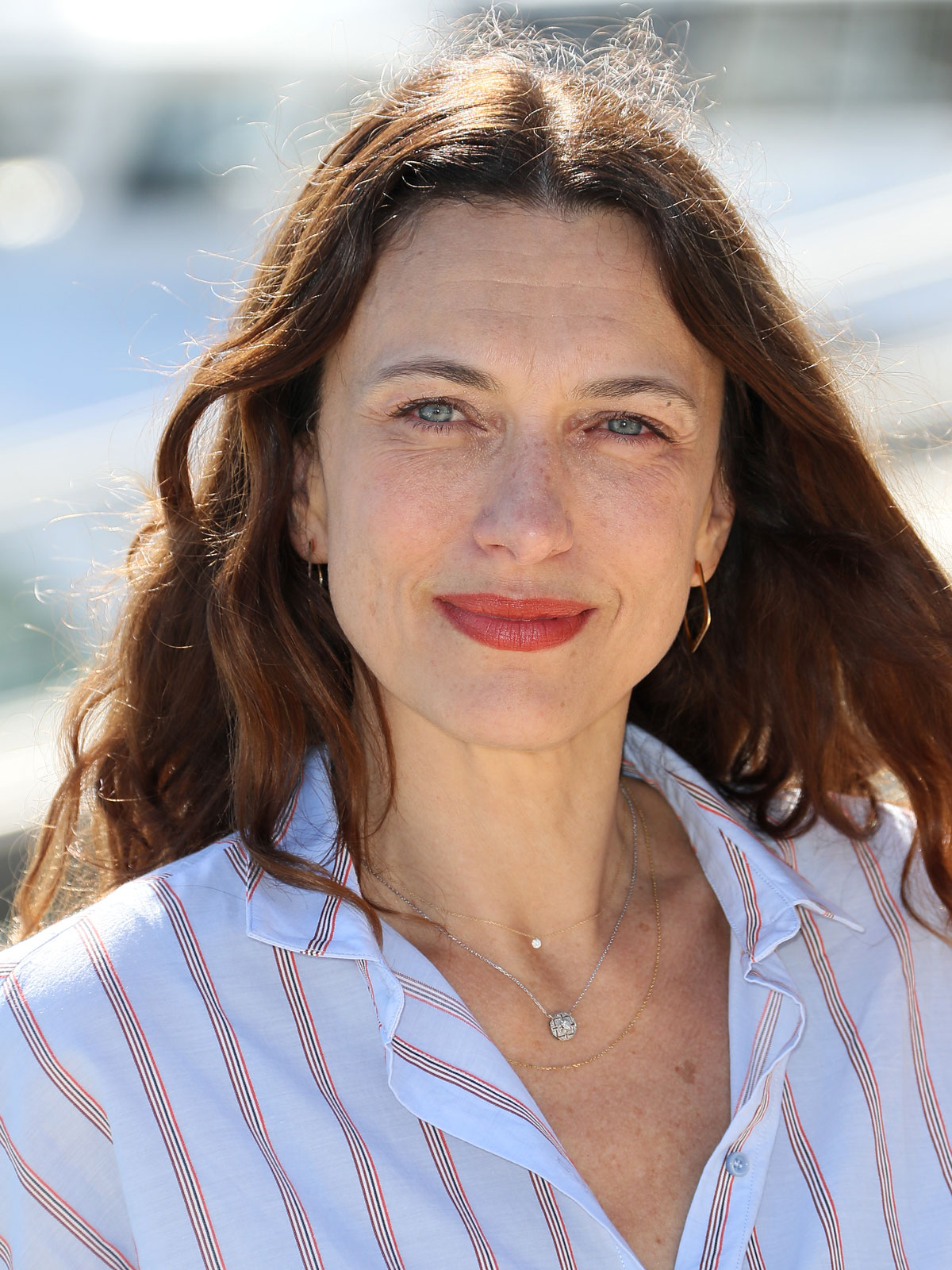
- Natacha Lindinger in 2018
- Born: 20 February 1970 (age 56); Paris, France
- Occupation: Actress
- Years active: 1990-present

Natacha Lindinger (born 20 February 1970) is a French actress. She has appeared in more than sixty films since 1990.

== Theater ==
Year	Title	Author	Director
1990	Double Inconstancy	Pierre de Marivaux	Christophe Lidon
1991	The Real Inspector Hound	Tom Stoppard	Valérie Nègre & Lionel Abelanski
2000	Show Business	George Huang	Thomas Langmann

== Filmography ==
=== Film ===
Year	Title	Role	Director	Notes
1995	Ainsi soient-elles	The terrace lady	Patrick Alessandrin & Lisa Azuelos	
1995	Bons baisers de Suzanne		Christian Merret-Palmair	Short
1997	Double Team	Kathryn Quinn	Tsui Hark	
1997	La ballade de Titus	Jeanne	Vincent De Brus	
1998	À tout de suite		Douglas Law	Short
1999	Mes amis	Carla	Michel Hazanavicius	
2002	Quelqu'un de bien	Virginie	Patrick Timsit	
2003	Not For, or Against	Caprice	Cédric Klapisch	
2005	Vive la vie	Richard's ex-wife	Yves Fajnberg	
2005	Jack	Victoria	Roland Collin	Short
2006	Célibataires	Muriel	Jean-Michel Verner	
2007	Two Worlds	Lucile	Daniel Cohen	
2009	Coco Chanel & Igor Stravinsky	Misia Sert	Jan Kounen	
2012	La clinique de l'amour	Samantha Bitch	Artus de Penguern & Gábor Rassov	
2012	Bye Bye maman	Monique	Keren Marciano	Short
2013	Amitiés sincères	Béatrice	Stéphan Archinard & François Prévôt-Leygonie	
2014	Divin Enfant	Elisabeth	Olivier Doran	
2015	Papa lumière	Elyane	Ada Loueilh	
2017	Les ex	Caroline Atlan	Maurice Barthélemy	
2017	La veillée	Irène	Jonathan Millet	Short
2019	L'incroyable histoire du facteur Cheval	Garance	Nils Tavernier	
2021	OSS 117: From Africa with Love	Micheline Pierson	Nicolas Bedos	

=== Television ===
Year	Title	Role	Director	Notes
1991	Cas de divorce	Gaëlle André	Gérard Espinasse	TV series (1 episode)
1992	Fenêtre sur femmes	Élise d'Horville	Don Kent	TV movie
1992-93	Nestor Burma	Hélène	Henri Helman, Gérard Marx, ...	TV series (8 episodes)
1995	Passion mortelle	Rachel Baldi	Claude-Michel Rome	TV movie
1995	Victor et François	Hélène	Josée Dayan & Ruben Goots	TV movie
1995	Une femme dans la nuit	Laetitia Laroche	Eric Woreth	TV movie
1995	Chien et chat	Ingrid	Marc Simenon	TV series (1 episode)
1995	Extrême limite		Laurent Lévy	TV series (2 episodes)
1995-96	Les boeuf-carottes	Sylvie Kaan	Denis Amar & Peter Kassovitz	TV series (2 episodes)
1997	La parenthèse	Béatrice	Jean-Louis Benoît	TV movie
1997	Un étrange héritage	Cécile Lefort	Laurent Dussaux	TV movie
1998	Only Love	Denise	John Erman	TV movie
1998	Micro climat	Annie	Marc Simenon	TV movie
1998	Tous les papas ne font pas pipi debout	Dan	Dominique Baron	TV movie
1999	Vertiges	Delphine Frénel	Christian François	TV series (1 episode)
1999	Pepe Carvalho	Alexandra	Merzak Allouache	TV series (1 episode)
1999	Un homme en colère	Inès	Dominique Tabuteau	TV series (1 episode)
2000	Passion assassine	Muriel Hélin	Didier Delaître	TV movie
2000	20.13 - Mord im Blitzlicht	Carla	John Bradshaw	TV movie
2001	Un couple modèle	Isabelle	Charlotte Brändström	TV movie
2001	Dans la gueule du loup	Clothilde Chambord	Didier Grousset	TV movie
2002	L'été rouge	Hélène De Graf	Gérard Marx	TV mini-series
2003	Aurélien	Mary de Perceval	Arnaud Sélignac	TV movie
2003	Commissaire Valence	Cécile	Vincenzo Marano	TV series (1 episode)
2003	L'agence coup de coeur	Margaux	Stéphane Kurc	TV series (1 episode)
2004	L'enfant de l'aube	Hélène	Marc Angelo	TV movie
2004	Les eaux troubles	Bénédicte Lambert	Luc Béraud	TV movie
2004	Le grand patron	Elsa	Claudio Tonetti	TV series (1 episode)
2005	Lucas Ferré: Le plaisir du mal	Ariane Mereanu	Marc Angelo	TV movie
2005	Père et maire	Patricia	Patrick Volson	TV series (1 episode)
2006	Le porte-bonheur	The red hair nurse	Laurent Dussaux	TV movie
2006	Zodiaque	Eva Trammel	Claude-Michel Rome	TV mini-series
2006	Commissaire Cordier	Estelle Fernez	Michaël Perrotta	TV series (1 episode)
2007	Trenhotel	Brigitte	Lluís Maria Güell	TV movie
2007	Confidences	Pauline	Laurent Dussaux	TV movie
2007	La lance de la destinée	Cécile Beranger	Dennis Berry	TV mini-series
2008	Villa Marguerite	Marie Müller	Denis Malleval	TV movie
2008	Roméro et Juliette	Juliette Lavigne	Williams Crépin	TV movie
2008-15	Hard	Sophie	Cathy Verney, Benoît Pétré, ...	TV series (30 episodes)
2009	Hors du temps	Hélène Porter	Jean-Teddy Filippe	TV movie
2009	La mort n'oublie personne	Élisabeth Quinoux	Laurent Heynemann	TV movie
2010	Le repenti	Anne Marceau	Olivier Guignard	TV movie
2010	1788... et demi	Countess Florence de Sacy	Olivier Guignard	TV mini-series
2012	Caïn	Anna Spiegelman	Bertrand Arthuys	TV series (1 episode)
2013	La famille Katz	Karen	Arnauld Mercadier	TV series (6 episodes)
2014	Le général du roi	Marie Morgane	Nina Companeez	TV movie
2014	Détectives	Justine Debricourt	Renaud Bertrand	TV series (1 episode)
2014	The law of Barbara	Nadège Langevin	Didier Le Pêcheur	TV series (1 episode)
2015	Accused	Agathe Delors	Didier Bivel	TV series (1 episode)
2015-18	Les Petits Meurtres d'Agatha Christie	Dr Euphrasie Maillol	Eric Woreth, Olivier Panchot, ...	TV series (4 episodes)
2017	Mon frère bien-aimé	Sonia Leroy	Denis Malleval	TV movie
2017	Kaboul Kitchen	Victoria	Virginie Sauveur, Guillaume Nicloux, ...	TV series (8 episodes)
2017-21	Sam	Sam	Jean-Marc Brondolo, Philippe Lefebvre, ...	TV series (38 episodes)
2018	La Faute	Claire Riverti	Nils Tavernier	TV mini-series
2021	Germinal	Madame Hennebeau	David Hourrègue	TV mini-series
2021	Je te promets	Olivia Paris	Arnaud Sélignac & Renaud Bertrand	TV series (6 episodes)
2022	Entre ses mains	Clara Desroches	Vincent Lannoo	TV movie
2022	Le Flambeau, les aventuriers de Chupacabra	Carole	Jonathan Cohen & Jérémie Galan	TV series (9 episodes)
2023	Avenir	Sofia Martin	Frank Bellocq	TV mini-series
2024	Parents à perpétuité	Laurence	Safy Nebbou	TV movie
