= Mozinor =

TikTok information
- Page: mozinor_officiel

YouTube information
- Channel: mozinor
- Genre: détournements
- Website: mozinor.com

Mozinor is a French creator of video détournements that are shared on the Internet, as well as being regularly shown on some television programs. Using simple materials like a computer and microphone, he has created a number of well known détournements such as a parody of Michael Jackson's Beat It". His videos are widely viewed on websites such as Dailymotion and YouTube.

== Biography ==
The pseudonym Mozinor comes from Claude Le Goas' French industrial building Montreuil-Zone Industrielle-Nord, located in Montreuil.

In May 2004, Mozinor began creating video détournements and publishing them on his website; originally they were simply parodies created to amuse his friends. In June 2006, the broadcasting of "Bite It" (a parody of Michael Jackson's "Beat It") and "007" at the Enfants de la télé opened his work to a wider audience, and created a marketing buzz about Mozinor's creations.

On 11 April 2009, a 'best of' Mozinor's works was shown at a screening of the noted détournement La Classe américaine at the Centre Georges Pompidou, in the presence of the film's creators, Michel Hazanavicius and Dominique Mezerette. Mozinor was invited to attend the screening, but did not do so as he wanted to retain his anonymity.
