= Ludovic Bource =

French composer

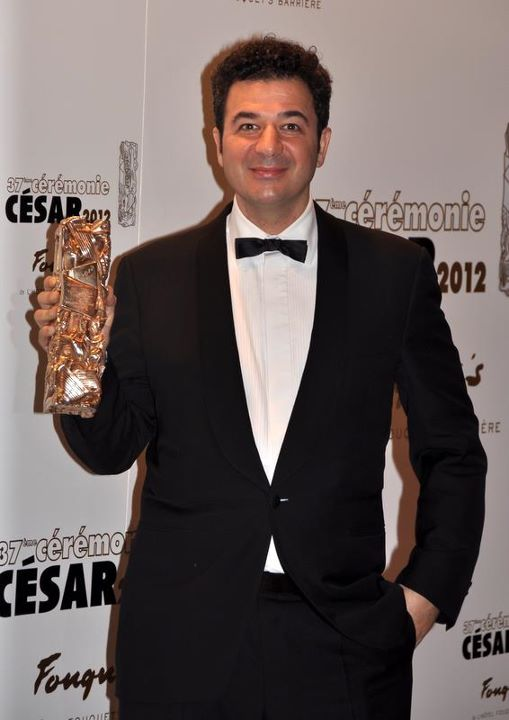
- Bource at the 37th César Awards

Background information
- Born: August 19, 1970 (age 55); Pontivy, France
- Occupation: Composer
- Years active: 1999–present

Ludovic Bource (French pronunciation: [ly.do.vik buʁs]; born 19 August 1970 in Pontivy) is a French composer best known for his work in film scoring. He rose to international critical acclaim in 2011 for composing the Golden Globe- and Academy Award-winning score for The Artist.

== Life and career ==
Bource first studied music at a conservatory in Brittany, moving afterwards to the Centre d'Informations Musicales (CIM), in Paris, where he studied Jazz. Bource began his career composing music for commercials, but later moved on to short films, such as, En attendant (2000), Spartacus (2003), and Sirene Song (2005). After working on the Michel Hazanavicius film Mes amis, Bource has become a long-time collaborator with the director. He has since scored such Hazanavicius films as OSS 117: Cairo, Nest of Spies (2006), its sequel OSS 117: Lost in Rio (2009), and most recently the black-and-white silent film The Artist (2011). The latter, recorded with award-winning Brussels Philharmonic, elevated Bource to international fame and earned him numerous accolades, including a César Award, a Golden Globe, and an Oscar. He was invited to join the Academy of Motion Picture Arts and Sciences in June 2012 along with 175 other individuals.

== Filmography ==
Year	Title	Notes
1999	Mes amis	film
2000	C.D.D.	Short film
2000	En attendant	Short film
2003	Spartacus	Short film
2005	Sirene Song	Short film
2006	OSS 117: Cairo, Nest of Spies	film
2009	Here to Stay	Documentary
2009	OSS 117: Lost in Rio	film
2011	The Artist	Academy Award for Best Original Score; BAFTA Award for Best Film Music; Boston Society of Film Critics Award for Best Score; Broadcast Film Critics Association Award for Best Composer; César Award for Best Music Written for a Film; European Film Award for Best Composer; Golden Globe Award for Best Original Score; Las Vegas Film Critics Society Award for Best Score; Phoenix Film Critics Society Award for Best Original Score; Washington D.C. Area Film Critics Association Award for Best Score; Nominated — Chicago Film Critics Association Award for Best Original Score; Nominated — Grammy Award for Best Original Score; Nominated — San Diego Film Critics Society Award for Best Original Score
2012	On the Other Side of the Tracks	film Originally titled De l'autre côté du périph
2013	Clear History	TV film
2022	Little Nicholas: Happy As Can Be (Le Petit Nicolas : Qu'est-ce qu'on attend pour être heureux ?)	Animated film
