= Eva Wilson =

Eva Wilson may refer to:

- Eva Wilson, fictional character played by Jennifer Tilly
- Eva Wilson, see Atout cœur à Tokyo pour OSS 117
- Eva Wilson, Miss Earth New Zealand
- Eva Wilson, adoptive daughter of Henry Wilson
- Eva Wilson, signatory to The Suffragette Handkerchief

== See also ==
- Eve Wilson, Coronation Street character
