= OSS 117: Cairo, Nest of Spies =

2006 film by Michel Hazanavicius

- Theatrical release poster
- French: OSS 117: Le Caire, nid d'espions
- Directed by: Michel Hazanavicius
- Written by: Jean-François Halin; Michel Hazanavicius
- Based on: OSS 117 character by Jean Bruce
- Produced by: Éric Altmayer; Nicolas Altmayer
- Starring: Jean Dujardin; Bérénice Bejo; Aure Atika
- Cinematography: Guillaume Schiffman
- Edited by: Reynald Bertrand
- Music by: Ludovic Bource; Kamel Ech-Cheikh
- Production companies: Mandarin Cinéma; Gaumont; M6 Films
- Distributed by: Gaumont Columbia TriStar Films
- Release date: 19 April 2006 (France)
- Running time: 99 minutes
- Country: France
- Languages: French; Arabic
- Budget: €14.1 million ($15.2 million)
- Box office: $23.1 million

OSS 117: Cairo, Nest of Spies (French: OSS 117 : Le Caire, nid d'espions) is a 2006 French spy comedy film directed and co-written by Michel Hazanavicius. Starring Jean Dujardin, Bérénice Bejo, and Aure Atika, the film has been widely praised for its cinematography, editing, and score. Set in 1955, the film follows the exploits of a French secret agent, Hubert Bonisseur de La Bath/OSS 117, as he is sent to Cairo to investigate the disappearance of his best friend and fellow spy Jack Jefferson, only to stumble into a web of international intrigue.

While set in Cairo most of the filming was done in Morocco. Hazanavicius' set pieces were carefully constructed and added to the movie's general level of geographic, as well as time period authenticity. The energetic fight sequences between Dujardin and his long cast of assailants, as well as a heart stopping catfight between the film's two leading ladies were meticulously choreographed.

The movie is based on author Jean Bruce's fictional character Hubert Bonisseur de La Bath, an American military officer of French descent, formerly employed by the Office of Strategic Services and then the CIA, who operates as a secret agent in France. OSS 117 reimagines the character as a French spy working for the French intelligence agency Service de Documentation Extérieure et de Contre-Espionnage.

Bruce's original OSS 117 starred in over 265 novels and seven films through 1970 and while the films were presented as straightforward spy thrillers, OSS 117 acts as a parody of the spy genre and depicts OSS 117 as a Frenchman who is "culturally insensitive, chauvinistic, and thoroughly moronic...[but] somehow manages to slide through outrageously dangerous situations unscathed, time and again." often with great, if unintentional humor.

A sequel, OSS 117: Lost in Rio, also directed by Hazanavicius and starring Dujardin, was released in 2009. A third installment of the series, OSS 117: From Africa with Love was released in 2021, directed by Nicolas Bedos.

== Plot ==
The film opens, pre-credits, with a black and white scene, titled "BERLIN 1945", where on board a military plane, Hubert Bonisseur de La Bath (OSS 117) and his friend Jack Jefferson take over a Nazi plane and recover stolen V2 plans. Following the credits, the film opens in Rome, several years later, where de La Bath is in a hotel room with Egyptian Princess Al Tarouk who gives him an envelope and instructs him to give the envelope to his superiors in Paris. In Paris, de La Bath is shown the contents of the envelope: photos showing the death of Jack. De la Bath is sent to Cairo by his superiors to investigate Jack's death and the simultaneous disappearance of a cargo ship's load of weapons.

In Egypt, de La Bath meets his contact, Larmina, who is a former business associate of Jack and an OSS operative. Soon after his arrival, de La Bath attends an embassy party where Larmina introduces him to livestock businessmen Moeller, Pelletier, and Setine. During the party, a British spy tries to give de La Bath information about Jack, but is killed by a hooded figure who escapes before Hubert can catch him.

As de La Bath tries to sleep at night, he is continually awakened by a muezzin's call to prayer. Upset at all the noise, he climbs the nearby tower and berates the muezzin for rudely interrupting his sleep. Seizing the muezzin's microphone, he tells him to shut up and then proceeds to broadcast his annoyance to the city via the tower's loudspeaker. Enraged, a group of religious fanatics, led by an Imam, call for a revolution. Larmina is disgusted by de La Bath's attitude towards Egypt and Islam and betrays him by luring him to a meeting of the Eagles of Keops. The Eagles beat him and throw him into the Suez Canal to drown, but he escapes. Setine, whom he met earlier, is a Russian spy and has Hubert attacked at a steam bath. De La Bath suspects that Setine is behind the missing arms shipment and kills him. Moeller, who is revealed as a Nazi, believes de La Bath knows where the arms are stored and lures him to a secret Nazi base inside a pyramid where Hubert turns the tables on his kidnappers and traps them inside the pyramid as he escapes. De La Bath then wins over Larmina by giving her proof that the Eagles killed her father. Larmina meets with the Imam and finds out that he is buying the missing arms shipment from another spy at a nearby fishing dock that evening. The Imam will supply the Eagles with the arms he purchases. Larmina tells de la Bath of the arrangement.

De La Bath is unable to proceed directly to the fishing dock due to an incident at the chicken coop. Wheh he arrives, he discovers it is an ambush by Pelletier who wants to kill him and so he can corner the poultry market. He attacks Hubert but then accidentally shoots himself. Upon his arrival at the dock, Jack appears, revealing that not only is he alive, he was the hooded figure who killed the British spy at the embassy and is now selling the stolen arms to the Eagles. Princess Al Tarouk appears and reveals that she is also seeking to acquire the arms for her own purposes. Accusing Jack of double-crossing her on the deal, she shoots him dead. Larmina knocks out the Imam and attacks Al Tourouk. When Al Tourouk gets the upper hand in the fight she scrambles across the dock for her gun and points it at Larmina. De La Bath points his gun at Al Tourouk and yells at her to stop but accidentally squeezes the trigger of his own gun and kills her. De La Bath and Larmina destroy the arms cachet and kiss.

Back in Paris, de La Bath's superiors in Paris congratulate him on his successful mission and tell him to go sort out the mess in Iran.

== Cast ==
- Jean Dujardin as Hubert Bonisseur de La Bath, a.k.a. OSS 117
- Bérénice Bejo as Larmina el-Akmar Betouche
- Richard Sammel as Gerhard Moeller
- Philippe Lefebvre as Jack Jefferson
- Aure Atika as Princess Al-Tarouk
- Claude Brosset as Armand Lesignac
- Éric Prat as Gilbert Plantieux
- François Damiens as Raymond Pelletier
- Constantin Alexandrov as Ieveni Setine
- Laurent Bateau as Nigel Gardenborough
- Said Amadis as Egyptian spokesman
- Youssef Hamid as The Imam
- Khalid Maadour as The Man Following OSS 117
- Arsène Mosca as Loktar
- Abdallah Moundy as Slimane
- Alain Khouani as the Hotel Receptionist

== Production ==
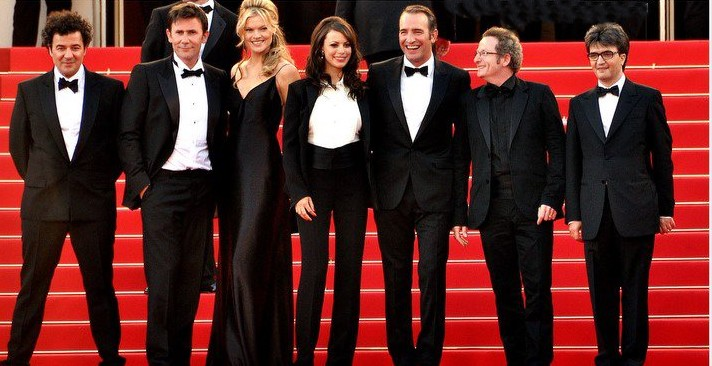
Bource (left), Hazanavicius (second from left), Bejo (center), Dujardin (third from right), and Schiffman (second from right), reunited for the 2011 Academy Award winning film The Artist

The film is a continuation of the OSS 117 series of spy films from the 1950s and 1960s, which were in turn based on a series of novels by Jean Bruce, a prolific French popular writer. However, instead of taking the genre seriously, the film parodies the original series and other conventional spy and Eurospy films, most noticeably the early James Bond series right down to the cinematography, art direction, music and costume of the 1960s (although this is a slight anachronism as the film is stated in dialogue to be set in 1955, hence a sequence where de La Bath briefly dances the twist is out of place). For example, driving scenes are all filmed with obvious rear projection. Night scenes were clearly shot during the day with a blue filter and camera movements were simple, and avoid the three-dimensional Steadicam and crane movements that are easily accomplished today. The scene at the Cairo airport was filmed in the entrance hall of a campus of Panthéon-Assas University. Michael Hazanavicius initially wanted Jean-Paul Belmondo to play Armand Lesignac, but the role was ultimately taken by Claude Brosset.

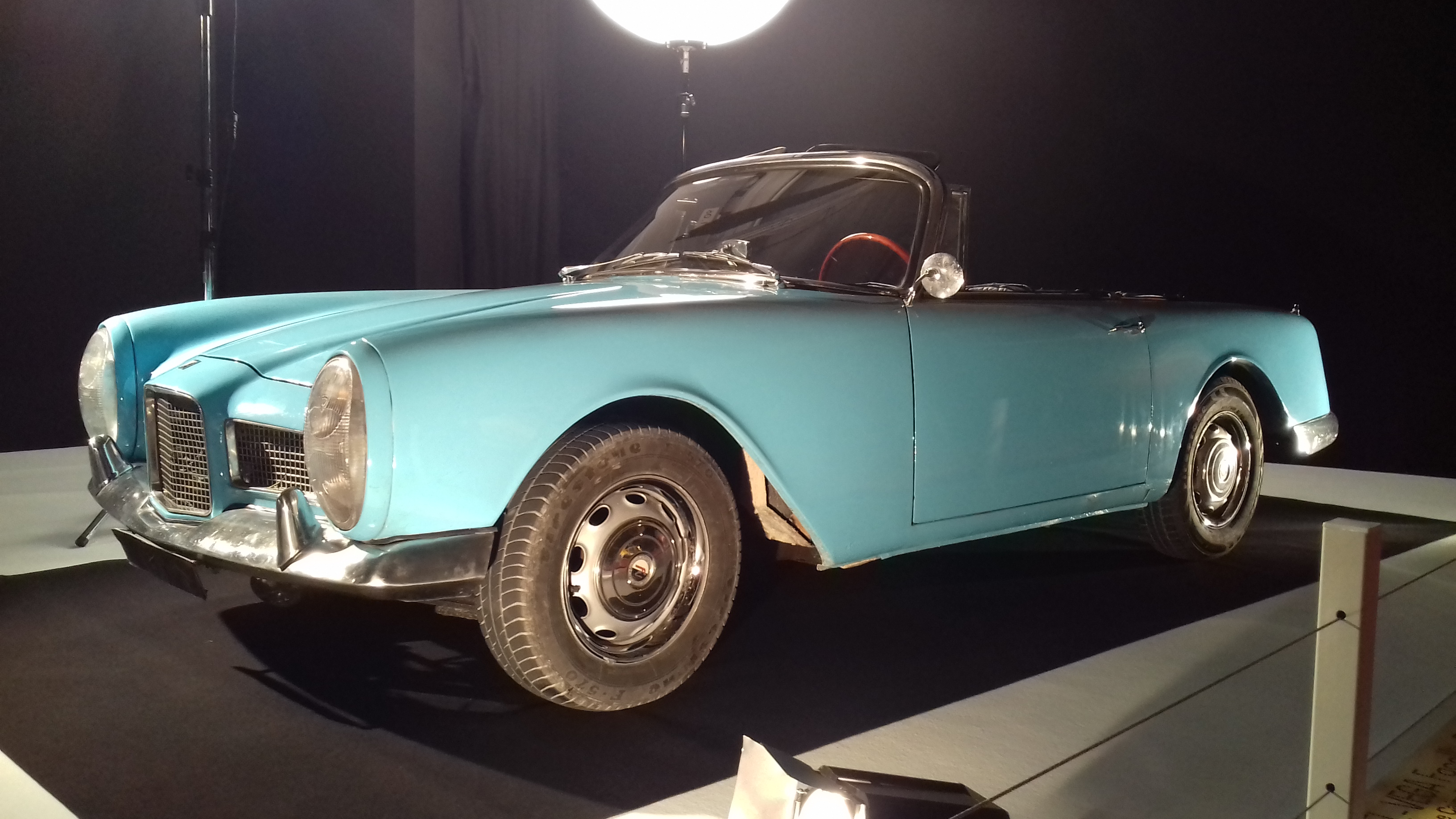
Larmina picks up de La bath at the airport driving a Facel Vega model that did not exist until 1959, a chronological inconsistency for a movie set in 1955.

=== 2007 Bérénice Bejo interview ===
During the 2007 French Film Festival UK, Bejo granted an interview with the Edinburgh Evening News where she spoke of her role in the film. "My role is a sort of James Bond girl, but she's intelligent. On the other hand Agent OSS 117 [played by Jean Dujardin] is rather stupid. My character is very focused, very feminine and very glamorous. For once you won't see me in trainers and jeans, but in high heels."

But unlike a Bond girl, "Larmina is more than just window dressing. Intellectually she is ahead of her times, but she doesn't want to break the rules or traditions. Yet she is the brain of the team. Larmina may be seen as a bit of an accessory but actually she is in the driving seat."

Bejo admitted the role allowed her to "Feel like those icons, Kim Novak and Audrey Hepburn that I have always dreamt about becoming one of these days. Besides giving lots of pleasure and laughter, the film is very stylish in a way that does not exist anymore in French comedy." Bejo also noted that she undertook a rigorous keep-fit regime, saying "I had to learn to dance and also work on stunts, especially in the fight scene with my co-actress Aure Attika. I liked my work on the film because it was totally different from anything else I had done previously."

== Reception ==
OSS 117 is a real treat. With the comedy played almost straight, it's comparable to the best of the Pink Panther films, and it's much smarter than Steve Carell's Get Smart. It's more fun than that film with Quantum in the title too. Cineastes will appreciate how it re-creates the look of 1950s cinema. Politically inclined viewers will approve of its satire of Western foreign policy. Everyone else will be rolling in the aisles as the hero and villain throw live chickens at each other.

OSS 117: Cairo, Nest of Spies won the Golden Space Needle award as the most popular film of the Seattle International Film Festival and the Tokyo Grand Prix award given to the best film at the Tokyo International Film Festival in 2006. It was relatively successful at the box office in France, with an attendance figure of over two million. Due to the film's performance, a 2009 sequel was made titled OSS 117: Lost in Rio. A third film in the series, also starring Dujardin, OSS 117: From Africa with Love was released in 2021.

Critics outside France gave positive reviews. As of June, 2009, the review aggregator Rotten Tomatoes reported that 76% of critics gave the film positive reviews, based on 58 reviews. Metacritic reported the film had an average score of 62 out of 100, based on 20 reviews. In the UK, The Guardian's Peter Bradshaw gave the film particular praise, citing a "far higher comedy-factor than the dull Get Smart, and the most lovingly detailed period pastiche since Todd Haynes's Far from Heaven".

=== Spy genre comparisons ===
As a spoof of the spy genre, OSS 117 was frequently compared to James Bond by critics, but the film also drew comparisons to Maxwell Smart, Austin Powers, and Inspector Clouseau, the bumbling French detective in Blake Edwards's The Pink Panther series.

OSS Agent 117 as the debonair, smartly dressed spy, attracting females at every step in Cairo, has been compared to having "an almost stunning resemblance to the Sean Connery of the Dr. No period, with "not one black shellacked hair out of place", as well as a young Connery in From Russia With Love. Among the similarities were, "...hair slicked with Vitalis, the arched eyebrows and the hairline of Sean Connery, as well as the great star's trick of adjusting the knot of his necktie after every exertion".

The French spy also had a Bond-like air of confidence that in OSS 117: Cairo Nest of Spies is reimagined as an amusing level of arrogance: when informed that his mission is to investigate Jack's death, solve the Suez crisis, monitor the Soviets, foil a coup plot by King Farouk's relatives, quell a Muslim religious rebellion, and bring peace to the Middle East once and for all, he replies "No problem".

In a 2006 interview, Dujardin said that he studied the habits and dress of similar characters during the 1950s and 60s, especially the French films of Eddie Constantine. Ensuring a good portrayal, both he and Hazanavicius would refer to James Bond's behavior during the filming, saying "A little bit of Sean [Connery] here, and a lot of bullshit there."

Some critics thought the scene of the lead female actresses fighting, barefoot and stripped to their underwear, was crass and voyeuristic. Others thought it was humorous and compared favorably to the catfight scene in the Bond movie From Russia with Love

Like the Bond movie From Russia With Love, the OSS 117 catfight scene features a scantily-clad battle of barefoot, brown eyed brunettes with Bejo and Atika supplanting the gypsy roles played Martine Beswick and Aliza Gur in Russia. One reviewer thought it was superior to the Bond version, while another thought it was a "...hilarious nod to Bond's misogyny." and the "climax" of the movie's Bond parody. But several film reviewers criticized the clothes stripping fight, saying the film couldn't resist the crass scene of two women fighting in their underwear. Another critic observed that Agent 117 was clearly aroused by the sight of "...an over-the-top catfight on a fishing pier [where] he does nothing to stop them as they rip each other’s clothes off." and another questioned whether the audience was "...meant to chuckle when the film's two female characters rip off each other's clothes during a fight on a dock while 117 looks on with pleasure."

In the same 2006 interview, Bejo addressed the catfight scene between her and Atika, saying it was an important part of the film, carefully choreographed, and that her and Atika rehearsed it for a week. Bejo also enjoyed her character, saying that OSS 117 needed her. Unlike Dujardin, Bejo didn't try emulate actresses in traditional spy films, but she instead relied on the behavior and movements of actresses like Audrey Hepburn.

Other aspects also drew comparisons to the Bond series, including the score, credited to Ludovic Bource and Karnel Ech-Cheik, which carefully re-created the sound of John Barry's 007 music, mimicking the brass and percussion notes of the Bond scores. Costume designer Charlotte David and cinematographer Guillaume Schiffman's attention to detail has been credited as so precise that "if unaware of its actual production date, you'd swear you were watching a film from the late 60s - it's that well executed".

=== Xenophobia and homophobia ===
As a comedic satire of Western attitudes toward the Middle East, OSS Agent 117 has both contempt for, and ignorance of, Islamic culture. He verbally attacks a Muslim prayer-caller for making too much noise so early in the morning, disturbing his sleep. As Bejo chauffeurs him around Egypt, she can barely tolerate his efforts to sound sophisticated as he nonchalantly tells her how smart the pharaohs must have been to build the Suez Canal 4,000 years ago and how amazed he is at the amount of sand in Egypt. At the embassy party he offers her a drink. When she tells him it is against her religion, he says, "What kind of stupid religion would forbid alcohol?" and then assures her not to worry, saying of Islam "You'll grow tired of it - it won't last long." He then proceeds to make fun of Arabic. When Bejo tells him "Millions of people speak it," he laughs, "Surely you exaggerate, do you know how many a million is?" Out of frustration and anger at his Franco-centrism, Bejo yells at him, "You're so ... French!" "Why, thank you," he replies.

The movie also includes multiple signs of both homophobia and latent homosexuality as Agent OSS 117, in flashbacks, spends a lot of time cavorting with Jack on the beach, to include wrestling and hugging each other while wearing short swim trunks.

=== Analysis ===
While presented as a spy spoof comedy, the film has raised questions of bigotry, colonialism, imperialism, and ethno-centric nationalism, leading to considerable discussion among cinephiles. In a 2006 interview, the director and cast addressed some of these issues.

Dujardin, when asked about the political incorrectness of the film said it may seem incorrect in current society, but was a very good reflection of France in the 50s. Concurrently, he acknowledged that the script writers found it difficult to make the film work and "really pushed the envelope to the maximum so that it was clear that it was not a racist or reactionary intention." Dujardin also claimed that they wanted to avoid making a moralistic film since the cinema should remain as a bastion of free expression.

Hazanavicius, in the same interview, said that it was the producers who came up with the idea for the film, but were worried about funding, given the controversial aspects of the script. To avoid accusations of racism, he tried to establish an overall framework of parody as well as design elegant sets with amusing dialog between the characters. Hazanavicius said that he actually believed the film to be politically correct, but also venturing into a territory where the movie industry no longer dares to go.

Laurent Jullier, Professor of Film Studies at the University of Lorraine has provided an analysis discussing three approaches to the film:

- View the film as a comedy and not dwell on the issues presented in the film
- Appreciate the film as educational tool, as a caricature, symbolic of the French mindset prevalent in the 50s and 60s
- Discuss the larger issue: “can we laugh at everything?” If so, do we continue to propagate racist, sexist or homophobic discourse? "How can we be absolutely sure that the film is not apologizing for what it denounces, in the very fact that it allows it to be expressed by playing down the drama of condemnable ideologies?"
