= OSS 117: From Africa with Love =

- Film poster
- French: OSS 117: Alerte Rouge en Afrique Noire
- Directed by: Nicolas Bedos
- Screenplay by: Jean-François Halin
- Adaptation by: Nicolas Bedos
- Based on: OSS 117 by Jean Bruce
- Produced by: Éric Altmayer; Nicolas Altmayer
- Starring: Jean Dujardin; Pierre Niney; Fatou N'Diaye; Natacha Lindinger; Habib Dembélé; Pol White; Ivan Franek; Gilles Cohen; Wladimir Yordanoff
- Cinematography: Laurent Tangy
- Edited by: Anny Danché; Florent Vassault
- Music by: Nicolas Bedos; Anne-Sophie Versnaeyen
- Production companies: Gaumont; Mandarin Production; Scope Pictures; M6 Films
- Distributed by: Gaumont
- Release dates: 21 July 2021 (Cannes); 4 August 2021 (France)
- Running time: 117 minutes
- Country: France
- Language: French
- Budget: €18.35 million
- Box office: $13.4 million

OSS 117: From Africa with Love (original French title in France: OSS 117: Alerte Rouge en Afrique Noire; lit. 'OSS 117: Red Alert in Black Africa', title in Quebec: OSS 117: Bons baisers d'Afrique, lit. 'OSS 117: "Warm Greetings" from Africa') is a 2021 French spy comedy film directed by Nicolas Bedos from a screenplay by Jean-François Halin. It is the eleventh film based on the Hubert Bonisseur de La Bath / OSS 117 character created by Jean Bruce and the third in the parody series starring Jean Dujardin as a comedic take on the titular character, preceded by OSS 117: Cairo, Nest of Spies (2006) and OSS 117: Lost in Rio (2009), both of which were directed by Michel Hazanavicius.

From Africa with Love is set in 1981, 14 years after Lost in Rio, and follows OSS 117 on a mission in Black Africa (unknown country) where he teams up with a young agent, OSS 1001. It co-stars Pierre Niney, Fatou N'Diaye, Natacha Lindinger, Habib Dembélé, Pol White, Gilles Cohen, and Wladimir Yordanoff. The film premiered at the 2021 Cannes Film Festival on 21 July 2021, and theatrically released on 4 August 2021 in France and Canada.

== Plot ==
After his successful escape from Afghanistan, Hubert Bonisseur de La Bath - also known as OSS 117 - is assigned to a computer operator desk job by the head of French Intelligence, Armand Lesignac, operating as the agency's tax accountant. However, after an operative goes missing in action, Hubert is immediately summoned to travel to Africa and find his colleague, who was scheduled to meet with the country's president, Koudjo Sangawe Bamba, but no contact has been made.

Hubert travels to Africa and meets with President Bamba, who keeps clones and identical stand-ins close by in case an attempt was made on his life. Bamba briefs Hubert on the country's political instability, the attempts to stage a coup on his regime by numerous opposing groups, and his dissatisfaction that the previous agent they sent disrespectfully didn't attend the meeting. With the influence of communism spreading across the continent, the president requests Hubert to track down the source and avert any potential revolutions especially when the interests of the French government aligning with Bamba's reign are endangered. Given their alliance, Hubert starts his investigation by following Léon Nkomo, one of Bamba's top men, witnessing a suspicious change of hands with an unidentified party at the presidential palace. After unsuccessfully interrogating Nkomo, Hubert is lured into a trap by a confidence man which leads to his arrest by the local police.

At the prison, Hubert recognized the missing operative, Serge, and unabashedly blows his cover by carelessly scolding him over neglecting to meet with President Bamba, thus preventing him from infiltrating the opposition. Following a brief riot, both men are formally acquitted of charges on the orders of the president and set free. Serge tries to wonder about the purpose behind Hubert's act whether it was incompetence and sheer stupidity, or deep ingenuity of planning ahead. He informs Hubert that he learned a French arms dealer, Roland Lépervier, is organizing a deal with an underground rebellion. They tail him to the pier where he's been smuggling weapons in containers and Serge plants a tracker on one of the shipments. They come to the conclusion via analysis that Lépervier isn't working alone, barely being a middleman, and the arms are actually supplied by the Soviet Union to back their revolution.

The next morning, using Serge's tracking device, they head out to Lépervier's warehouse, fighting off hostile rebels in the process, they set explosive charges to the containers and escape just in time they blow up, killing Lépervier in the blast. Upon trying to find their way back to the city, Serge berates Hubert for his persistent condescending behavior after the latter warns him not to disturb the swamp where crocodiles lie. While he ignores Hubert's warnings and continues to taunt him, a crocodile pulls Serge to the swamp to his presumed death.

Not long after, Hubert is captured by the underground rebellion and discovers that they are led by Zéphyrine Bamba, the president's wife. Explaining the situation of her country to Hubert, she informs him of her husband's cruelty and corrupt motivations of power and greed while leaving her countrymen to suffer from poverty and oppression. She unveils her true scheme to have the Soviets as their allies with the belief that communism will instill equality among the people. Hubert appears to sympathize with her pacifism, and it leads to the both of them spending a romantic night together, only for Hubert's colonial-minded nature to thwart the mutual understanding they seemed to have and raise hostile tensions between the two, ending up in his reimprisonment. Hubert, however, incapacitates a guard, steals his disguise and escapes from the rebel camp.

Accepting the president's invitation to the formal dinner party he's holding at his palace in the wake of his re-election, he comes across Zéphyrine and attempts to gain her trust once more, promising that he will try and influence the president's decisions to be fair and of goodwill towards the people. After assuring the president of the coup's neutralization, Hubert tries to convince him to change his ways. President Bamba analyzes an offer made to him by the Soviet Union and prepares to accept their alliance over the French after favoring the new deal in spite of maintaining the same stance on his social politics. A distraught Hubert accidentally blows Zéphyrine's cover on the scene as the leader of the failed revolution, earning her death sentence on charges of high treason. Zéphyrine assassinates Bamba and most of his clones until Hubert prevents her from killing the last one for the reason that he will maintain his alliance with the French government instead. Bamba's clone orders his men to take Zéphyrine away, for which Hubert is oblivious that they will carry on with her sentence, mocking her for "being overdramatic".

Hubert returns to France and learns from Armand that Zéphyrine escaped custody with the help of the Soviets and resumed her full-time position as the leader of the rebellion. He's ordered to fly to the USSR where she's taken refuge and track her down with the intent of bringing her to justice. Upon his departure, Hubert boasts to Armand that he cannot be replaced no matter how many new agents come around, telling him that "there'll always be one OSS 117, and he'll always be around."

The mid-credits scene reveals that Serge has somehow survived, crawling in an African jungle due to his legs being torn apart by the crocodiles.

== Cast ==
- Jean Dujardin as Hubert Bonisseur de La Bath / OSS 117
- Pierre Niney as Serge / OSS 1001
- Fatou N'Diaye as Zéphyrine Bamba
- Natacha Lindinger as Micheline Pierson
- Habib Dembélé as Koudjo Sangawe Bamba
- Pol White as Léon Nkomo
- Ivan Franek as Kazimir
- Gilles Cohen as Roland Lépervier
- Wladimir Yordanoff as Armand Lesignac

Additionally, director Nicolas Bedos makes a cameo appearance at the presidential party as Micheline's date. Bruno Paviot, Karim Barras, and Jean-Édouard Bodziak briefly reprise their roles as Roger Moulinier, Jacky Jacquard, and Jean-René Calot respectively from Au service de la France, a French espionage television series created by OSS 117 scribe Jean-François Halin. Christelle Cornil also reprises her role as Josy Ledentu, Armand's personal secretary from the previous film. Actress Melodie Casta portrays Jessica, a CIA agent sent to help Hubert escape from a KGB base. Brice Fournier appears in a minor role as a French tourist on a safari in Africa.

== Production ==
In November 2014, Jean Dujardin publicly expressed interest in reprising his role as OSS 117 one more time. The film was officially announced by Dujardin in February 2018 with a projected release date set for early 2019. Despite having initially planned to return to direct, Michel Hazanavicius chose not to partake in the production due to creative differences with screenwriter Jean-François Halin over the script. Instead, Nicolas Bedos, a fan of Dujardin's portrayal of the character, was appointed at the helm after contacting the producers with ideas of his own. Filming took place between November 2019 and February 2020 in France and Kenya on location, while the interior scenes were shot at studio sound stages in Paris. As was the case with the preceding entries, the film took inspiration from the pop culture of the era it was set in, including the James Bond series, particularly For Your Eyes Only and Never Say Never Again, as well as the Indiana Jones films.

Having previously collaborated on La Belle Époque, Bedos and Anne-Sophie Versnaeyen wrote and composed the score for the film, with Versnaeyen citing Bill Conti's work on For Your Eyes Only as a major inspiration for the soundtrack. The duo also wrote the theme song named after the film, "From Africa with Love", which is performed by French singer Indy Eka, accompanying the opening title sequence designed by David Tomaszewski, who took inspiration from the works of Maurice Binder, Robert Brownjohn and Daniel Kleinman, paying homage to the main titles from the James Bond films.

== Release ==
=== Theatrical ===
OSS 117: From Africa with Love premiered as the closing film at the 2021 Cannes Film Festival. It was theatrically released in France on 4 August 2021 by Gaumont after being delayed twice due to the COVID-19 pandemic.

=== Home media ===
The film was released on DVD and Blu-ray by Gaumont on 8 December 2021.

== Reception ==
Unlike its predecessors, OSS 117: From Africa with Love received polarizing reviews, with praise for Jean Dujardin's performance, visuals and action sequences but criticized the script, climax and being inferior to the preceding entries, while the humour received mixed reviews.

== Future ==
Director Nicolas Bedos and screenwriter Jean-François Halin both expressed interest in a fourth film, even though nothing official is in the pipeline as of yet.
