= OSS 117 – Double Agent =

- Italian film poster
- Directed by: Jean-Pierre Desagnat; Renzo Cerrato; André Hunebelle
- Written by: Renzo Cerrato; Jean-Pierre Desagnat; Pierre Foucaud; Michel Lévine
- Based on: Pas de roses pour OSS 117 by Jean Bruce
- Produced by: André Hunebelle
- Starring: John Gavin; Curt Jurgens; Luciana Paluzzi; Margaret Lee
- Cinematography: Tonino Delli Colli
- Edited by: Jolanda Benvenuti
- Music by: Piero Piccioni
- Distributed by: Cinema International Corporation (Italy); Valoria Films (France)
- Release date: 28 July 1968
- Running time: 105 minutes
- Countries: Italy; France
- Language: English
- Box office: 1,226,223 admissions (France)

OSS 117 – Double Agent (also known as OSS 117: Murder for Sale or No Roses for OSS 117 (Pas de Roses pour OSS 117, or Niente rose per OSS 117)) is a 1968 Eurospy film about agent OSS 117, starring John Gavin.

== Cast ==
- John Gavin as Hubert Bonisseur de La Bath, alias OSS 117, alias William Chandler
- Margaret Lee as Aïcha Melik
- Curd Jürgens as the Major
- Luciana Paluzzi as Maud the doctor
- Robert Hossein as Dr Saadi
- Rosalba Neri as Conchita
- George Eastman as Karas
- Guido Alberti as Farouk Melik
- Piero Lulli as Heinrich Van Dyck
- Renato Baldini as MacLeod
- Luciano Bonanni as a policeman

== Production ==
Frederick Stafford did not reprise his role as he was filming Alfred Hitchcock's Topaz and was replaced by John Gavin. The film used an idea of having the hero undergo plastic surgery to fool his enemies, an idea discarded by the film On Her Majesty's Secret Service (1969) that was being filmed at the same time.

The film was shot in Rome and Tunisia. It was known during production as No Roses for Robert.

== Reception ==
The film was only a moderate success at the box office in France – the 40th most popular film of the year.

It was not released in the US despite Gavin's presence in the lead role. However the film did help Gavin be cast, briefly, as James Bond in Diamonds Are Forever (1971).
