= OSS 117 Is Unleashed =

- French theatrical poster
- Directed by: André Hunebelle
- Screenplay by: Raymond Borel; Pierre Foucaud; André Hunebelle
- Based on: novel by Jean Bruce
- Produced by: Paul Cadéac; Cyril Grize
- Starring: Kerwin Mathews
- Cinematography: Raymond Lemoigne
- Edited by: Jean Feyte
- Music by: Michel Magne
- Distributed by: SN Prodis
- Release date: 1963
- Running time: 110 minutes
- Country: France
- Language: France
- Box office: 2,329,798 admissions (France)

OSS 117 Is Unleashed aka OSS 117 se déchaîne is a 1963 French spy film starring Kerwin Mathews. It is part of the OSS 117 series.

== Cast ==
- Kerwin Mathews as Hubert Bonisseur de La Bath, alias OSS 117
- Nadia Sanders as Brigitta
- Irina Demick as Lucia
- Henri-Jacques Huet as Renotte
- Jacques Harden as Roos
- Roger Dutoit as Mayan
- Albert Dagnant as Forestier

== Reception ==
It was the 14th most popular film of the year in France with admissions of 2,329,798. Mathews reprised the role one more time in Shadow of Evil.
