= La Classe américaine =

1993 television film by Michel Hazanavicius and Dominique Mézerette

- Written by: Michel Hazanavicius; Dominique Mézerette
- Directed by: Michel Hazanavicius; Dominique Mézerette
- Starring: John Wayne; Dustin Hoffman; Robert Redford; Paul Newman
- Music by: Laurent Petitgirard
- Country of origin: France
- Original language: French

Production
- Producers: Ève Vercel; Robert Nador; Michel Lecourt
- Editors: Jean-Michel Kuess; Guy Rondi
- Running time: 70 minutes
- Production companies: Dune; Studio Canal+

Original release
- Release: 31 December 1993

La Classe américaine (French pronunciation: [la klas ameʁikɛn]; lit. 'American Class'), also known as Le Grand Détournement (The Great Détournement), is a 1993 French television film, written and directed by Michel Hazanavicius and Dominique Mézerette. It consists exclusively of extracts of old Warner Bros. films, put together and dubbed with new lines so as to create an entirely new film that is a parody of Citizen Kane.

== Plot ==
The film begins with the following lines appearing on screen, complete with deliberate spelling mistakes: "Attention! Ce flim n'est pas un flim sur le cyclimse. Merci de votre compréhension." ("Attention! This flim is not a flim about cyclign. Thank you for your understanding.")

The story begins with the death of George Abitbol (John Wayne), described as the "Classiest man in the world", somewhere near the fictitious atoll of "Pom Pom Galli" in the "South Pacific" (a place taken from the Wayne movie The Sea Chase). Reporters Dave (Paul Newman), Peter (Dustin Hoffman) and Steven (Robert Redford) investigate his death by going to meet people who knew him during his life in "Tegzas". They mostly investigate his last words: "Monde de merde" (French for "Shitty world").

== Cast ==
- John Wayne as George Abitbol
- Burt Lancaster as José
- Lana Turner as Isabelle
- Jason Robards as Editor in chief
- Dustin Hoffman as Peter
- Robert Redford as Steven
- Paul Newman as Dave
- Orson Welles as himself
- Martin Balsam as Callaghan
- Henry Fonda as Hugues
- Ricky Nelson as George's friend
- Charles Bronson as the Native American chief
- James Stewart as Jacques
- Dean Martin as Dino
- Elvis Presley as the "putain d'énergumène" ("damn oddball")
- Frank Sinatra as Franky
- Stuart Whitman as the future's man
- Ned Beatty as Frédéric
- Angie Dickinson as Jacqueline
- Spencer Tracy as the professional witness
- Ernest Borgnine as Ernest
- Jan-Michael Vincent as the helicopter fan
- Clark Gable as the actor
- Yvonne De Carlo as the actor's wife
- Robert Mitchum as Yves
- Randolph Scott as Joël Hammond
- James Franciscus as Professor Hammond
- Lauren Bacall as Christelle
- Slim Pickens as Deep Throat
- Antonio Fargas as Huggy
- Walter Brennan as Stumpy
- Jacqueline Bisset as the helicopter woman
- Burgess Meredith as the helicopter man
- Jack Warden as a journalist
- Akim Tamiroff as Dino's friend
- Serge Hazanavicius as Dubbed Voice
- Patrick Guillemin as Dubbed Voice
- Marc Cassot as Dubbed Voice
- Christine Delaroche as Dubbed Voice
- Jean-Yves Lafesse as Dubbed Voice
- Évelyne Grandjean as Dubbed Voice
- Alain Chabat as Dubbed Voice

== Production ==
Warner Bros. had given the French film and television studio Canal+ Group the rights to use extracts of Warner Bros. films. Hazanavicius and Mézerette set about producing an entire film from cut-and-paste existing footage, and hired the usual French dubbers of John Wayne (Raymond Loyer), Paul Newman (Marc Cassot) and Kirk Douglas (Roger Rudel) to perform the dubbing. La Classe américaine, which lasts seventy-two minutes, incorporates scenes cut from about fifty films, including All the President's Men, Rio Bravo, Band of Angels, The Cheyenne Social Club, Blood Alley, Bullitt, The Candidate, Chisum, The Cowboys, The Crimson Pirate, and When Time Ran Out.

It is the third and last film of a triptych entitled Le Grand Détournement, composed of Derrick contre Superman (September 1992) and Ça détourne (December 1992).

== Bibliography ==
- Hazanavicius, Michel; Mézerette, Dominique (2020). La Classe américaine (in French). Paris: Allary Éditions. ISBN 978-2-37073-331-3.

== See also ==
- J-Men Forever
- Dead Men Don't Wear Plaid
- John Wayne filmography
- Mozinor
- Guy Debord
