= Five Ashore in Singapore =

- Belgian film poster
- Directed by: Bernard Toublanc-Michel
- Written by: Sergio Amidei; Bernard Toublanc-Michel; Pierre Kalfon
- Based on: Cinq gars pour Singapour by Jean Bruce
- Produced by: Pierre Kalfon
- Starring: Sean Flynn
- Cinematography: Jean Charvein
- Release date: 3 March 1967
- Running time: 95 minutes
- Countries: France; Italy
- Language: English

Five Ashore in Singapore AKA Singapore, Singapore and Cinq gars pour Singapour is a 1967 French/Italian international co-production film based on the 1959 novel by Jean Bruce. Filmed on location in Singapore in 1966, it was the last film of Sean Flynn.

The film was based on a novel by Jean Bruce who created OSS 117 and the working title was OSS117 Goes to Singapore.

== Plot ==
Capt. Art Smith and four US Marine volunteers in Singapore investigate the disappearance of other Marines on shore leave in that city and discover that a mad scientist is responsible.

== Cast ==
- Sean Flynn ... Captain Art Smith
- Marika Green ... Monika Latzko
- Terry Downes ... Sgt. Gruber
- Marc Michel ... Captain Kevin Gray
- Dennis Berry ... Lt. Dan
- Bernard Meusnier ... Lt. Ángel McIlhemy
- Peter Gayford ... Mr. Brown
- Andrea Aureli ... Ta-Chouen
- Jessy Greek ... Ten-Sin
- Trudy Connor ... Tchin-Saw
- William Brix ... Cpt. Kafir
- Foun-Sen ... Hsi-Houa
- Ismail Boss ... Gang Member
