= Jean Dujardin =

French actor (born 1972)

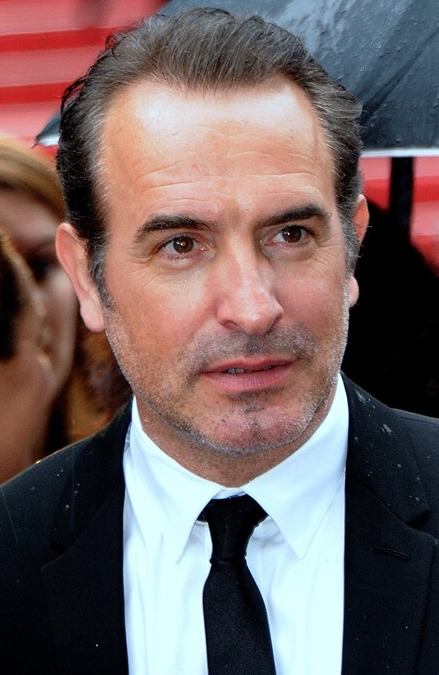
- Dujardin at the 2019 Cannes Film Festival
- Born: Jean Edmond Dujardin; 19 June 1972 (age 54); Rueil-Malmaison, France
- Occupations: Actor; comedian; television director
- Years active: 1996–present
- Spouses: Gaëlle Demars (div. 2003) Alexandra Lamy (m. 2009; div. 2014) Nathalie Péchalat (m. 2018; sep. 2024)
- Partner: Aurélie Chaigneau (2026–present)
- Children: 4

Jean Edmond Dujardin (French: [ʒɑ̃ ɛdmɔ̃ dyʒaʁdɛ̃]; born 19 June 1972) is a French actor and comedian. He began his career as a stand-up comedian in Paris before guest starring in comedic television programmes and films. He first came to prominence with the popular TV series Un gars, une fille (1999–2003), in which he starred alongside his partner Alexandra Lamy, before becoming a popular film actor with comedies such as Brice de Nice (2005), Michel Hazanavicius's OSS 117: Cairo, Nest of Spies (2006), its sequel OSS 117: Lost in Rio (2009) and OSS 117: From Africa with Love (2021), and 99 Francs (2007).

Dujardin garnered international fame and widespread acclaim with his performance of George Valentin in the 2011 award-winning silent movie The Artist by Hazanavicius. The role won him numerous awards, including the Academy Award for Best Actor (the first for a French actor), the Golden Globe Award, the BAFTA Award, the Screen Actors Guild Award and the Cannes Film Festival's Best Actor Award. Despite this newfound popularity, he chose to keep his focus on France, where he remains a popular actor, although he later appeared in the English-language films The Wolf of Wall Street (2013) and The Monuments Men (2014).

== Early life ==
Jean Dujardin was born on 19 June 1972 in the commune of Rueil-Malmaison, Hauts-de-Seine department, Île-de-France region, in the western suburbs of Paris. He grew up in neighbouring Plaisir, Yvelines. After attending high school, he went to work for the construction company of his father, Jacques Dujardin, as a locksmith. Dujardin began contemplating a career in acting while serving his mandatory military service a few years later.

== Career ==
Jean Dujardin began his acting career performing a self-written one-man show in various bars and cabarets in Paris. He first gained attention when he appeared on the French talent show Graines de star in 1996 as part of the comedy group Nous Ç Nous, which was formed by members of the Carré blanc theater.

From 1999 to 2003, Dujardin starred in the France production of the originally Canadian comedy series Un gars, une fille, alongside his future wife Alexandra Lamy, before transitioning to a career in film. The TV series charted the path of a relationship; each episode was less than ten minutes long. In 2005, he portrayed the titular surfer in the popular comedic film Brice de Nice and performed on its accompanying soundtrack.

In 2006, Dujardin starred as racist, sexist secret agent Hubert Bonisseur de La Bath in the comedy OSS 117: Cairo, Nest of Spies, a role which earned him an Etoile D'Or Award and a César Award nomination for Best Actor. The film's success spawned the sequels OSS 117: Lost in Rio and OSS 117: From Africa with Love. In 2007, directed by Jan Kounen, he starred in the film 99F (99 francs), a very successful existential parody of an advertising exec, adapted from the eponymous best-seller written by Frédéric Beigbeder. This same year, he ventured in drama for the first time on the silver screen, playing a tortured father and cop in Franck Mancuso's Contre-enquête. In 2009, he appeared in A Man and His Dog alongside screen legend Jean-Paul Belmondo, with whom he has often been compared. In 2010, he starred alongside Albert Dupontel, playing his character's cancer in The Clink of Ice, a French black comedy written and directed by Bertrand Blier.

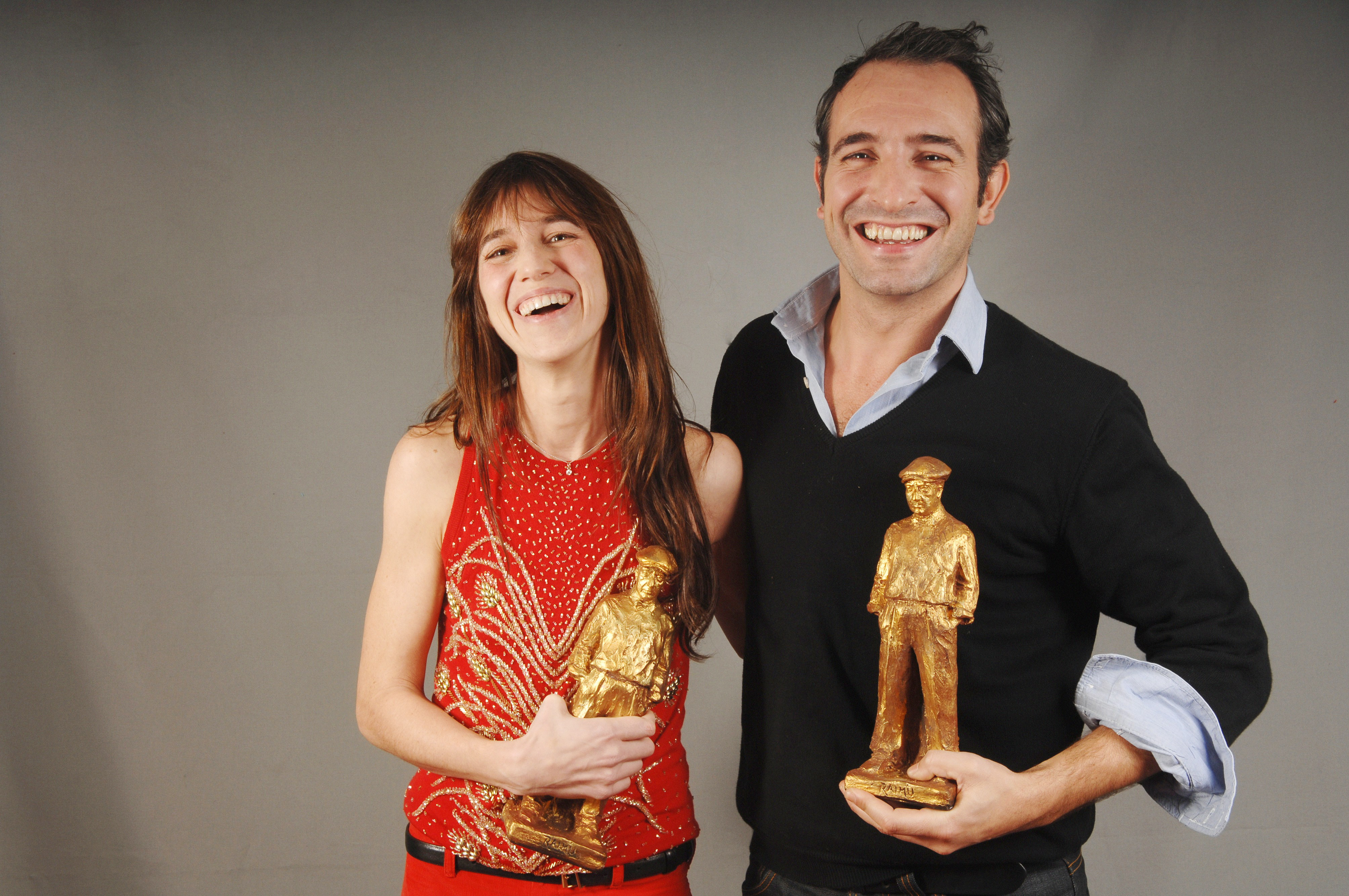
Jean Dujardin with Charlotte Gainsbourg in 2011

In 2011, Dujardin starred as movie star George Valentin in the silent film The Artist, reuniting him with OSS 117: Cairo, Nest of Spies director Michel Hazanavicius and his co-star in that film, Bérénice Bejo. The film premiered at the 2011 Cannes Film Festival, where he received the Best Actor Award. His performance garnered much critical acclaim and he received numerous nominations, including the Broadcast Film Critics Association Award for Best Actor and the Screen Actors Guild for Best Actor.

On 15 January 2012, Dujardin won a Golden Globe Award for Best Actor – Motion Picture Musical or Comedy. He later went on to win the Screen Actors Guild for Best Actor, and the BAFTA for Best Actor. He was also nominated for the César award of the best actor but lost it to Omar Sy for his role in the second most ever viewed movie in France Intouchables. Dujardin went on to win the Best Actor award at the 84th Academy Awards. In effect he is the fourth French actor to be nominated for an Oscar and the first to win the Best Actor. Following his Oscar nomination for his role in The Artist, WME agency signed the actor.

French film historian Tim Palmer has analyzed Dujardin's career and rise to success in France, noting how his formative roles were often unredeemable buffoons, very skillful portrayals of childlike men who aggressively and unabashedly reject the responsibilities and compromises of adult life. Dujardin's breakthrough roles as Brice de Nice and OSS 117 exemplified this tendency.

In February 2012, Dujardin appeared in Les Infidèles with co-star and friend Gilles Lellouche. He was invited to join the Academy of Motion Picture Arts and Sciences in June 2012 along with 175 other individuals. In 2013, Dujardin starred in Éric Rochant's Möbius with Cécile de France and Tim Roth.

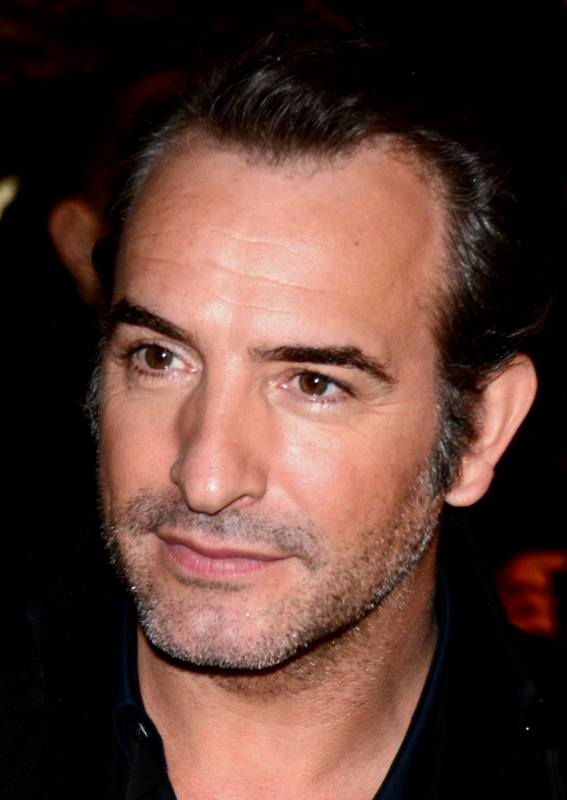
Jean Dujardin in 2014

His second film that year was Martin Scorsese's The Wolf of Wall Street, playing alongside Leonardo DiCaprio, Jonah Hill, Matthew McConaughey, and Kyle Chandler, among others. He appeared in The Monuments Men, directed by George Clooney, and co-starring Clooney, Matt Damon, and Cate Blanchett, and starred in the French film Le Petit Joueur.

In late 2014, La French, was released in Europe and subsequently in the United States in early 2015. He plays a French police magistrate who tries to dismantle the French Connection and bring down the Unione Corse.

== Personal life ==
Dujardin has been married three times and has four children. His first marriage, to Gaëlle Demars, ended in 2003. They have two sons, born in 2000 and 2001. In 2003, he started dating his on-screen partner Alexandra Lamy of the comedy series Un gars, une fille; the two had originally met at the audition, and fell in love while shooting the series. They married in Anduze on 25 July 2009. In November 2013, it was announced that the couple had separated.

He began dating French ice dancer Nathalie Péchalat in 2014 after following her to Japan to watch her perform in the world ice skating championships, and they had a daughter whom they named Jeanne, in December 2015. They married on 19 May 2018 in a small ceremony. Péchalat gave birth to daughter Alice in February 2021.

== Filmography ==
=== Film ===
| Year | Title | Role | Director | Notes |
|---|---|---|---|---|
| 2002 | À l'abri des regards indiscrets | Jean-Luc | Ruben Alves; Hugo Gélin | Short |
| 2002 | If I Were a Rich Man | Weston the seller | Gérard Bitton; Michel Munz | |
| 2003 | Toutes les filles sont folles | Lorenzi | Pascale Pouzadoux | |
| 2003 | Bienvenue chez les Rozes | Mathieu Gamelin/MG | Francis Palluau | |
| 2003 | The Car Keys | Himself | Laurent Baffie | |
| 2004 | Cash Truck | Jacques | Nicolas Boukhrief | |
| 2004 | Mariages ! | Alex | Valérie Guignabodet | |
| 2004 | Les Dalton | Cowboy | Philippe Haïm | |
| 2004 | Rien de grave | Travelling Salesman | Renaud Philipps | Short |
| 2005 | La vie de Michel Muller est plus belle que la vôtre | Himself | Michel Muller | |
| 2005 | Brice de Nice | Brice de Nice | James Huth | Also co-writer |
| 2005 | L'Amour aux trousses | Franck | Philippe de Chauveron | |
| 2005 | Il ne faut jurer de rien ! | Valentin | Eric Civanyan | |
| 2006 | OSS 117: Cairo, Nest of Spies | Hubert Bonisseur de La Bath/OSS 117 | Michel Hazanavicius | |
| 2007 | Contre-enquête | Richard Malinowski | Franck Mancuso | |
| 2007 | Hellphone | The Warrior of the Cellar | James Huth | |
| 2007 | Deux sur la balançoire | Jerry Ryan | Yves Di Tullio; Bernard Murat | TV movie |
| 2007 | Cherche fiancé tous frais payés | Nightclub Host | Aline Issermann | |
| 2007 | 99 Francs | Octave Parango | Jan Kounen | |
| 2008 | Ca$h | Cash | Éric Besnard | |
| 2009 | A Man and His Dog | The Worker | Francis Huster | |
| 2009 | OSS 117: Lost in Rio | Hubert Bonisseur de La Bath/OSS 117 | Michel Hazanavicius | |
| 2009 | Lucky Luke | Lucky Luke | James Huth | Also co-writer |
| 2010 | Little White Lies | Ludo | Guillaume Canet | |
| 2010 | The Clink of Ice | Charles Faulque | Bertrand Blier | |
| 2010 | A View of Love | Marc Palestro | Nicole Garcia | |
| 2011 | The Artist | George Valentin | Michel Hazanavicius | |
| 2012 | The Players | Fred/Olivier/François/Laurent/James | Emmanuelle Bercot; Jean Dujardin; Michel Hazanavicius; Jan Kounen; Gilles Lellouche | Also co-director, co-writer and co-producer |
| 2013 | Möbius | Moïse | Éric Rochant | |
| 2013 | The Wolf of Wall Street | Jean-Jacques Saurel | Martin Scorsese | |
| 2013 | 9 Month Stretch | Sign Language Interpreter | Albert Dupontel | |
| 2014 | The Monuments Men | Jean-Claude Clermont | George Clooney | |
| 2014 | The Connection | Pierre Michel | Cédric Jimenez | |
| 2015 | Un plus une | Antoine Abeilard | Claude Lelouch | |
| 2016 | Up for Love | Alexandre | Laurent Tirard | |
| 2016 | Brice 3 | Brice de Nice | James Huth | Also co-writer |
| 2017 | Chacun sa vie | Jean the policeman | Claude Lelouch | |
| 2017 | Sahara | Georges | Pierre Coré | Voice |
| 2018 | I Feel Good | Jacques | Benoît Delépine & Gustave Kervern | |
| 2018 | Return of the Hero | Captain Charles-Grégoire Neuville | Laurent Tirard | |
| 2019 | Deerskin | Georges | Quentin Dupieux | |
| 2019 | An Officer and a Spy | Georges Picquart | Roman Polanski | |
| 2021 | OSS 117: From Africa with Love | Hubert Bonisseur de La Bath/OSS 117 | Nicolas Bedos | |
| 2021 | Présidents | Nicolas | Anne Fontaine | |
| 2022 | November | Fred | Cédric Jimenez | |
| 2023 | On the Wandering Paths | Pierre | Denis Imbert | |
| 2025 | The Shrinking Man | Paul | Jan Kounen | |
| 2026 | The Rays and Shadows | Jean Luchaire | Xavier Giannoli | |

=== Television ===
| Year | Title | Role | Notes |
|---|---|---|---|
| 1996–1999 | Carré Blanc / Nous C Nous | Various | TV sketches |
| 1997–1998 | Farce Attaque | Himself | Also co-writer |
| 1999–2003 | Un gars, une fille | Jean / "Loulou" | Lead role opposite later lover and wife Alexandra Lamy |
| 1999 | Un gars, une fille | Jean / "Loulou" | Special guest in the episode "À Paris"; reprised his role from the French series |
| 2007 | Palizzi | Dustman | Also creator and director |
| 2012 | Saturday Night Live | George Valentin-like character | Appeared in the "Les jeunes de Paris" sketch |
| 2013 | Le débarquement | Various | TV series (2 episodes) |
| 2013 | Platane | Himself | TV series (1 episode: "La fois où il a cru que le signe c'était un zodiac") |
| 2018 | Call My Agent! | Jean Dujardin | TV series (1 episode : "Jean") |
| 2023 | Alphonse | Alphonse | Lead role, 6 episodes |
| 2024 | Zorro | Zorro | Lead role, 8 episodes |

=== Music video ===
- 2005 : "Le Casse de Brice" (directed by J.G. Biggs)
- 2016 : "Pour un pote" featuring Bigflo & Oli

== Award and nominations ==
| Year | Association | Category | Nominated work | Result | Ref. |
|---|---|---|---|---|---|
| 2005 | NRJ Ciné Award | Best Look | Brice de Nice | Won | |
| 2005 | NRJ Ciné Award | Best Quote | Brice de Nice | Won | |
| 2006 | Étoile d'Or Award | Best Actor | OSS 117: Cairo, Nest of Spies | Won | |
| 2006 | César Award | Best Actor | OSS 117: Cairo, Nest of Spies | Nominated | |
| 2006 | Globes de Cristal Award | Best Actor | OSS 117: Cairo, Nest of Spies | Nominated | |
| 2006 | NRJ Ciné Award | Actor of the Year | OSS 117: Cairo, Nest of Spies | Nominated | |
| 2006 | NRJ Ciné Award | Best Look | OSS 117: Cairo, Nest of Spies | Nominated | |
| 2006 | NRJ Ciné Award | Best Kiss | OSS 117: Cairo, Nest of Spies | Nominated | |
| 2006 | NRJ Ciné Award | Best Quote | OSS 117: Cairo, Nest of Spies | Nominated | |
| 2006 | Raimu Award | Comedy | OSS 117: Cairo, Nest of Spies | Nominated | |
| 2007 | Raimu Award | Comedy | 99 Francs | Won | |
| 2007 | Étoile d'Or Award | Best Actor | 99 Francs | Nominated | |
| 2009 | Globes de Cristal Award | Best Actor | OSS 117: Lost in Rio | Nominated | |
| 2010 | Cabourg Film Festival | Best Actor | A View of Love | Won | |
| 2011 | Academy Award | Best Actor | The Artist | Won | |
| 2011 | AACTA Award | Best Actor | The Artist | Won | |
| 2011 | BAFTA Award | Best Actor in a Leading Role | The Artist | Won | |
| 2011 | Cannes Film Festival | Best Actor Award | The Artist | Won | |
| 2011 | Golden Globe Award | Best Actor – Motion Picture Musical or Comedy | The Artist | Won | |
| 2011 | Hollywood Film Festival | Spotlight Award | The Artist | Won | |
| 2011 | Independent Spirit Award | Best Male Lead | The Artist | Won | |
| 2011 | Las Vegas Film Critics Society Award | Best Actor | The Artist | Won | |
| 2011 | London Film Critics Circle | Actor of the Year | The Artist | Won | |
| 2011 | Phoenix Film Critics Society Award | Best Actor | The Artist | Won | |
| 2011 | Santa Barbara International Film Festival | Cinema Vanguard Award | The Artist | Won | |
| 2011 | Screen Actors Guild Award | Outstanding by an Actor in a Leading Role | The Artist | Won | |
| 2011 | Étoile d'Or Award | Best Actor | The Artist | Won | |
| 2011 | Women Film Critics Circle Award | Best Screen Couple (with Bérénice Bejo) | The Artist | Won | |
| 2011 | Alliance of Women Film Journalists | Best Actor | The Artist | Nominated | |
| 2011 | Critics' Choice Movie Awards | Best Actor | The Artist | Nominated | |
| 2011 | Central Ohio Film Critics Association Award | Best Actor | The Artist | Nominated | |
| 2011 | César Award | Best Actor | The Artist | Nominated | |
| 2011 | Chicago Film Critics Association | Best Actor | The Artist | Nominated | |
| 2011 | Dallas-Fort Worth Film Critics Association | Best Actor | The Artist | runner-up | |
| 2011 | Detroit Film Critics Society | Best Actor | The Artist | Won | |
| 2011 | European Film Award | Best Actor | The Artist | Nominated | |
| 2011 | Globes de Cristal Award | Best Actor | The Artist | Nominated | |
| 2011 | Houston Film Critics Society | Best Actor | The Artist | Nominated | |
| 2011 | Lumière Awards | Best Actor | The Artist | Nominated | |
| 2011 | National Society of Film Critics | Best Actor | The Artist | 2nd Runner-up | |
| 2011 | New York Film Critics Circle | Best Actor | The Artist | Nominated | |
| 2011 | Online Film Critics Society | Best Actor | The Artist | Nominated | |
| 2011 | San Diego Film Critics Society | Best Actor | The Artist | Nominated | |
| 2011 | Screen Actors Guild Award | Outstanding Cast in a Motion Picture | The Artist | Nominated | |
| 2011 | St. Louis Gateway Film Critics Association | Best Actor | The Artist | Nominated | |
| 2011 | Utah Film Critics Association Award | Best Actor | The Artist | Runner-Up | |
| 2011 | Vancouver Film Critics Circle | Best Actor | The Artist | Nominated | |
| 2011 | Washington D.C. Area Film Critics Association | Best Actor | The Artist | Nominated | |
| 2011 | Women Film Critics Circle | Best Actor | The Artist | Nominated | |
| 2019 | César Award | Best Actor | An Officer and a Spy | Nominated | |
| 2019 | Lumière Awards | Best Actor | An Officer and a Spy | Nominated | |
| 2022 | César Award | Best Actor | November | Nominated | |

== See also ==
- List of French Academy Award winners and nominees
- List of actors with Academy Award nominations
- List of Golden Globe winners
