= A View of Love =

- Film poster
- French: Un balcon sur la mer
- Directed by: Nicole Garcia
- Written by: Nicole Garcia; Jacques Fieschi; Frédéric Bélier-Garcia; Natalie Carter
- Produced by: Alain Attal
- Starring: Jean Dujardin
- Cinematography: Jean-Marc Fabre
- Edited by: Françoise Bonnot; Emmanuelle Castro
- Music by: Stephen Warbeck
- Distributed by: Pathé
- Release dates: 4 December 2010 (Marrakech); 15 December 2010 (France)
- Country: France
- Language: French
- Budget: $11.1 million
- Box office: $16.4 million

A View of Love (French: Un balcon sur la mer, lit. 'A balcony over the sea') is a 2010 French romantic mystery film written and directed by Nicole Garcia and starring Jean Dujardin. Set mainly in the south of France, it tells the story of three pied noir children parted when Algeria became independent. Years later two meet again, one a married real estate agent and the other a mysterious woman being used to defraud his firm. A recurrent parallel is with the play Iphigénie, in which the three children had acted together, where two princesses compete for the flawed hero but one dies tragically.

== Plot ==
In the south of France, Marc Palestro is a partner in his father-in-law's real estate agency. A client calling herself Mrs Maldonato, who is interested in buying a large old house, intrigues him. He thinks she must be Cathy, his childhood sweetheart from before his family fled Algeria in 1962. Memories of that time, both the horrors of civil war and the joys of adolescent love, grip him. When he offers Mrs Maldonato a lift, she takes a dip in the sea in her underclothes and then goes to a hotel room where the two make love.

She appears again to sign the preliminary contract to purchase the property. Obsessed with his first love, even though his mother tells him Cathy was killed in a bombing, Marc leaves his wife and daughter to try and find her once more. However, she is the elusive frontwoman for a crime syndicate and is in fact an aspiring actress who is being coached in this role by Sergio Bartoli, another partner in the agency and her lover. Though she had let Marc think she was the dead Cathy, in reality she was a close friend of the pair called Marie-Jeanne and had always adored Marc.

Marc discovers enough to expose Sergio's plot and then, in pouring rain, is reunited with Marie-Jeanne outside a theatre where she has secured a part.

== Cast ==
- Jean Dujardin as Marc Palestro
- Marie-Josée Croze as "Mrs Maldonato" / "Cathy" / Marie-Jeanne
- Toni Servillo as Sergio Bartoli
- Sandrine Kiberlain as Clotilde, Marc's wife
- Michel Aumont as Robert Prat, Marc's father-in-law
- Pauline Bélier as Emmanuelle, Marc's daughter
- Jacques Valles as Jo Fuentes, Marie-Jeanne's father
- Claudia Cardinale as Marc's mother
- Romain Millot as Marc as a child
- Solène Forveille as Cathy as a child
- Emma Maynadié as Marie-Jeanne as a child
- Emilie Chesnais as Patricia, secretary

== Reception ==
Calling it a "romantic and haunting film", a French review said:

"A magnificent idea drives the story: the woman with whom he falls in love to regain his memories is not the one he thought and it is a forgotten woman who reappears .... The film gradually frees itself from the psychological mechanics to reach a kind of lyrical abstraction ....The bold stand against the current climate (Dujardin in a completely lyrical and introspective role, the vagueness of time in the story, the absolute lack of irony) makes the film even more endearing."
