= OSS 117 Mission for a Killer =

Furia à Bahia pour OSS 117
- French theatrical release poster
- Directed by: André Hunebelle
- Screenplay by: Pierre Foucaud; Jean Halain; André Hunebelle
- Story by: Jean Bruce
- Produced by: Paul Cadéac
- Starring: Frederick Stafford; Mylène Demongeot; Raymond Pellegrin
- Cinematography: Marcel Grignon
- Music by: Michel Magne
- Production companies: Da.Ma. Cinematografica; Production Artistique Cinématographique; Produzioni Cinematografiche Mediterrannee
- Distributed by: Valoria Films
- Release date: 2 July 1965
- Running time: 102 minutes
- Countries: France; Italy
- Language: French
- Box office: $20.1 million

Furia à Bahia pour OSS 117 (released in the United States as OSS 117–Mission for a Killer) is a 1965 French/Italian international co-production Eurospy spy-fi film. It was the third OSS 117 film directed by André Hunebelle and produced by Paul Cadéac. Frederick Stafford made his film debut taking over the role of OSS 117 from Kerwin Mathews.

The film was shot on Brazilian locations and featured action scenes arranged by Hunebelle's stunt coordinator Claude Carliez with production design by Paul-Louis Boutié. It was based on Jean Bruce's 1955 novel Dernier quart d'heure his 44th OSS 117 book that was published in English in 1965 under the title Live Wire (UK) and The Last Quarter Hour (USA). The American edition featured commentary by Pierre Salinger, who was acquainted with Josette Bruce, Jean Bruce's widow. Josette would take up writing OSS 117 novels in 1966.

== Plot ==
Secret Agent OSS 117, Colonel Hubert Bonisseur de La Bath (Frederick Stafford) has his Alpine ski holiday interrupted to receive a briefing on a series of suicide attacks performed by trusted assistants of their targets that they blow up with themselves. Using the cover of a journalist named Hubert Delacroix, de La Bath flies to Brazil to meet his contact Thomas Ellis (Claude Carliez) who believes the killers have been drugged and hypnotised to perform their assassinations.

At Rio de Janeiro, de La Bath is paged over the airport loudspeaker system by a woman who identifies herself as Consuela Moroni (Perrette Pradier), Ellis's assistant. Noticing his being watched by two men who photograph him and Consuela's paging of him over the loudspeaker as a serious breach of secret agent protocol, de La Bath is suspicious. As Consuela takes him to a dockyard to meet Ellis, de La Bath takes the keys out of the car and leaves Consuela inside. His instincts are proved correct when he's attacked by three thugs, one who uses bolas as a weapon against him. De La Bath defeats the assassins with martial arts and their own bolas. Seeing the same two men from the airport watching him from a car, he uses a forklift truck to lift their car into the air. Consuela has vanished, but de La Bath has her car and drives to his hotel.

On a car radio he hears that Ellis has been in a serious car accident and hospitalised. As he visits the hospital to see Ellis, he meets Anna-Maria (Mylène Demongeot). She flew Ellis to the hospital after his automobile accident outside her ranch in Bahia. An assassin disguised as a Doctor shoots Ellis on the operating table as well as some of the medical staff before OSS 117 throws him out of a window.

Anna-Maria gives OSS 117 Ellis's wallet that contains his address as well as a key ring. He takes Anna-Maria to her house in Rio where she is being watched. Visiting Ellis's address he meets the real Consuela (Annie Anderson) who knows little except that she fears for her life and doesn't have the key to Ellis's safe, however she arranges a meeting the next day with Ellis's associate in Rio near the Christ the Redeemer statue.

Returning to his hotel room the false Consuela/phony Moroni is in de La Bath's room and spends the night with him. Still suspicious, de La Bath leaves Consuela in bed as he goes to the toilet, playing a tape recording of him whistling and using the bathroom as he dresses and leaves out the window to reenter the room after the false Conseula has let two thugs in who attempt to kill de La Bath in his bath. De La Bath captures them and leaves all three bound and gagged on his bed. They remain like that until the water from de La Bath's bathtub that is still running floods the bathroom causing a guest below to complain to the management of his being soaked. The three are arrested by the Rio police.

Prior to meeting Ellis's associate Carlos (François Maistre), de la Bath visits Anna-Maria who has been drugged with the suicide attack formula. She attempts to blow them both up with a hand grenade that de la Bath uses to dispatch the two thugs who drugged her.

Carlos has the key to the safe and reveals that what caused Ellis's car "accident" was a friend in the front seat attempting to assassinate him with a hand grenade. Carlos accompanies OSS 117 back to Ellis's apartment where he waits outside to give warning. In the apartment the real Consuela has been murdered by the same two thugs at the airport and dockyard who are attempting to open the safe with an acetylene torch. They use it as a flamethrower to kill de la Bath but he kills them with it. Warned by Carlos of another group of assassins entering the building, de la Bath leaves the torch running filling the room with gas. He ignites it from a window as the group of assassins enter the room.

Finding flowers in Ellis's safe that Ellis discovered to have been used to create the drug, de la Bath and Anne-Marie drive to her home in Bahia where another assassination attempt takes place by setting the road they are driving on aflame. Arriving at Anne-Marie's ranch courtesy of the unsuccessful assassin's vehicle, her friend Leandro (Raymond Pellegrin) flies them to the remote region of the Indians who harvest the flowers. They discover the locale is the headquarters of a secret neofascist organisation who wish to take over South America.

== Cast ==
- Frederick Stafford : Hubert Bonisseur de La Bath, aka 0SS 177
- Mylène Demongeot : Anna-Maria Sulza
- François Maistre : Carlos
- Raymond Pellegrin : Leandro
- Jacques Riberolles : Miguel Sulza
- Perrette Pradier : Consuela Moroni I
- Guy Delorme : Karl
- Annie Anderson : Consuela Moroni II
- Jean-Pierre Janic : Ludwig
- Michel Thomass : Russian client
- Richard Saint-Bris : Hotel manager
- Eric Vasberg : Henchman
- Henri Attal : Killer #1
- Dominique Zardi : Killer #2

== Reception ==
The film was the 11th biggest hit of the year in France with admissions of 2,686,432.
