= Le Paria =

- Directed by: Claude Carliez
- Written by: Claude Rank; Santos Alcocer; Mireille de Tissot
- Produced by: Carlton Continental, Ceres Films, Les Films Fernand Rivers, Santos Alcocer P.C.
- Starring: Jean Marais; Marie-José Nat
- Cinematography: Juan Gelpi
- Music by: Jean-Claude Pelletier
- Release date: 10 January 1969 (France)
- Running time: 102 minutes
- Countries: France; Spain
- Language: French
- Box office: 777,887 admissions (France)

Le Paria (English: The Pariah) is a French action film from 1969. It was directed by Claude Carliez, written by Claude Rank, starring Jean Marais and Marie-José Nat. The film was also known under the title Diamond Rush (UK), Jaque mate (Spain), L'ultimo colpo (Italy).

== Plot ==
Manu faces off against a band of gangsters. The villains find refuge in the house of a widow with a young son. Manu sacrifices himself for Lucia and her son.

== Cast ==
- Jean Marais as Manu
- Marie-José Nat as Lucia
- Horst Frank as Rolf
- Nieves Navarro as Sylvia
- Enrique San Francisco as José (as Quique San Francisco)
- J. Picas as Toccelli
- J. Rocha as Turchi
- Josep Castillo Escalona as Max (as C. Escalona)
- A. Gadea as Paul
- Jean Lara
- Jacques Stany
- Béatrice Delf
- Eric Donat

== Reception ==
It had admissions of 777 887.
