= OSS 117 Is Not Dead =

OSS 117 n'est pas mort
- Directed by: Jean Sacha
- Written by: Jacques Berland Screenplay; Jean Lévitte; Screenplay; Jean Bruce; Source material
- Produced by: Albert Bauer
- Starring: Ivan Desny
- Cinematography: Marcel Weiss
- Music by: Jean Marion
- Production company: Globe Omnium Films
- Distributed by: Republic Pictures (USA)
- Release date: August 14, 1957
- Running time: 80 minutes
- Country: France
- Language: French

OSS 117 n'est pas mort is the 1957 film debut of Jean Bruce's fictitious secret agent Hubert Bonnisseur de La Bath, alias OSS 117, and the beginning of a long-lasting series. It was released in the United States by Republic Pictures under the title OSS 117 is Not Dead in 1959

== Synopsis ==
OSS 117 is asked for help by a female acquaintance Muriel Rousset. She beseeches him to retrieve secret documents which have been stolen from Sir Anthony Lead, the father of Anita and Marion. He complies with her wish and no obstacle or danger can hinder him from meeting her expectations.

== Cast ==
- Ivan Desny as Hubert Bonnisseur de La Bath (alias OSS 117)
- Magali Noël as Muriel Rousset
- Yves Vincent as Boris Obarian
- Danik Patisson as Anita Lead
- Marie Déa as Marion Lead
- André Valmy as Joseph Sliven
- Béatrice Arnac as Nahedad Sin

== Background ==
Jean Bruce started publishing OSS 117 novels in 1949, four years before Ian Fleming's first James Bond novel was released. This first film adaptation of OSS 117 also preceded Bond on the silver screen, although the very first Bond adaptation premiered on U.S. television in 1954.
