= Claude Carliez =

French stunt performer

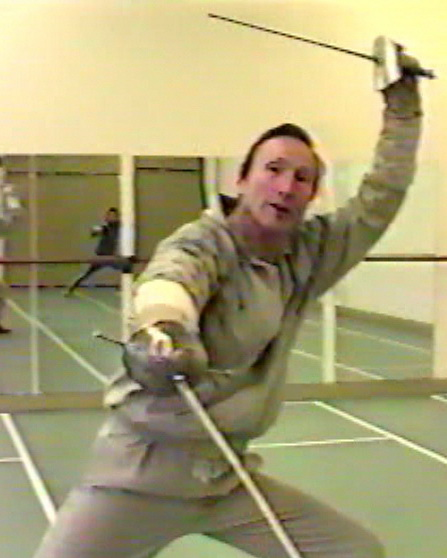
- Claude Carliez during arms training, 1993
- Born: January 10, 1925; Nancy, France
- Died: May 17, 2015 (aged 90)
- Occupations: Film fencing advisor; Stunt performer; Stunt coordinator

Claude Carliez (January 10, 1925 – May 17, 2015) was a French master at arms in classical fencing who became a period and fencing advisor for French films. He then became a stunt performer, stunt coordinator, special effects person, and film director. He worked with figures of the French cinema such as Jean Marais, Jean-Paul Belmondo, Louis de Funès, Gérard Oury and André Hunebelle. He was President of the 'Academie d'Armes de France' and the first President of the French Stuntman's Union.

== Biography ==
The son of a dancing expert, Carliez was born in Nancy, France in 1925.

He first began fencing in Joinville-le-Pont at the age of 18. He became a Master at Fencing at the age of 21. Due to the proximity of the school to film studios, Claude became a technical advisor on historical weapons and costumes for several films.

In 1959, Claude appeared in the swashbuckler film Le Bossu, starring Jean Marais and directed by André Hunebelle. Hunebelle placed him in charge of all the stunts for his next film Le Capitan, and he advanced to doing stunts for The Battle of Austerlitz.

Carliez worked on contemporary films such as Hunebelle's Fantômas series. He became the stunt arranger to André Hunebelle's OSS 117 film series. When the James Bond film Moonraker was produced in France and Brazil, Claude choreographed numerous stunts for the film.

In 1969, Jean Marais suggested that Claude directs him in Le Paria (1969).

He died on 17 May 2015, at the age of 90.

== Filmography ==
Year	Title	Role	Notes
1954	Cadet Rousselle	Policeman fighting in a duel	Uncredited
1955	Caroline and the Rebels		
1955	L'Affaire des poisons	A buyer of a miracle product	Uncredited
1956	Una aventura de Gil Blas		
1957	The Adventures of Arsène Lupin		Uncredited
1959	Le Bossu		
1960	Austerlitz	Margaron	
1961	Le Miracle des loups	Soldier	Uncredited
1962	Le Crime ne paie pas	The duel judge	(segment "L'affaire Hugues"), Uncredited
1965	OSS 117 Mission for a Killer	Thomas Ellis	Uncredited
1967	Les grandes vacances	Sailor	Uncredited
1976	Game of Seduction		
1979	Moonraker	Franco, The Gondolier	
1979	Écoute voir		Uncredited
1985	On the Killer's Track	Jules	
