= Counter Investigation =

- Poster
- French: Contre-enquête
- Directed by: Franck Mancuso
- Written by: Franck Mancuso, after a story by Lawrence Block
- Produced by: Patrick Gimenez, Eric Hubert, Romain Le Grand
- Starring: Jean Dujardin, Laurent Lucas
- Cinematography: Jérôme Alméras
- Edited by: Andrea Sedláčková
- Music by: Krishna Levy
- Distributed by: Pathé Distribution
- Release date: 2007
- Running time: 85 minutes
- Country: France
- Language: French
- Budget: $7.6 million
- Box office: $8 million

Counter Investigation (French: Contre-enquête) is a 2007 French crime film directed by Franck Mancuso that came out in 2007, with Jean Dujardin in the leading role. From a story by Lawrence Block, it is about a policeman whose young daughter is raped and murdered.

== Plot ==
When the young daughter of police captain Richard Malinowski is raped and murdered, his colleagues hastily find a suspect called Daniel Eckman. Despite there being no witnesses and no forensic evidence, he is sentenced to 30 years. From jail he starts writing to the policeman, expressing his deep regret for the death of the daughter and proclaiming his innocence. Doubts begin to surface in the mind of the policeman, who begins his own private enquiry. He finds that Salinas, a known serial killer of children, was in the area at the time of the killing.

As well as letters to the father, the prisoner has also been writing to Christine, a female sympathiser. He has a letter smuggled out to her, asking her to give false evidence on his behalf. A retrial is held and Eckman is freed, with compensation. Meeting Christine, he asks her to come away with him to a new life together, but she begins to have doubts about his honesty. He then rings Malinowski to ask if he can call round to thank him personally. Malinowski agrees, and gives him a whiskey full of sedative. When he comes to, he is bound in duct tape beside an open grave at the spot where the girl's body was found. Explaining that he always knew Eckman was his daughter's real killer, Malinowski buries him alive.

== Cast ==
- Jean Dujardin as Richard Malinowski
- Laurent Lucas as Daniel Eckman
- Agnès Blanchot as Claire Malinowski
- Aurélien Recoing as Stéphane Josse
- Jacques Frantz as Michel Arnalde
- Jean-Pierre Cassel as Dr. Delmas
- Jean-François Garreaud as Salinas
- Alexandra Goncalvez as Emilie Malinowski
- Claudine Vincent as Catherine Courrieux
- Caroline Santini as Christiane Carlier
- Marie Guillard as Mathilde Josse
- Gabriel Mancuso as Gabriel Josse
- Thierry Bosc as Albin Schneider
- Jean-Pierre Germain as Jean-François Perrin
- Benjamin Guyot as Lebars
- Luc Lavandier as Mertens
- Alain Meunier as Lieutenant Tarnos
- Jean-Pierre Rochette as Gino Battista
- Arsène Mosca as Ardouin
- Roland Timsit as Metlouti
- Hocine Choutri as Nault
- Nicolas Silberg as Maître Beckers
- Marie Espinosa as Vanessa
- Marie Lenoir as Presiding judge
- Françoise Pinkwasser as Annette Salinas
- Sophie Barjac as Judge Arcaro
- Philippe Ogouz as Appeal judge
- Georges Bécot as Maître Fiorucci
- Marc Samuel as Maître Darnay
- François Aramburu as Dr. Stéphanel
- Virginie Ledieu as Charlène Kraus
- Emmanuel Guttierez as Antoine Valdes
- Pierre-Jean Chérer as Stéphane Alexandre
- Fabrice Herbaut as Journalist
- Patrick Gimenez as Journalist
- Joseph Leroux as Sylvain Ferro
- Régis Romele as Undertaker
- Alexandra Goncalvez as Emilie Malinowski
- Sébastien Lalanne as Lawyer for Eckman
- Sophie Mounicot as Police inspector
