= Josette Bruce =

French novelist (1920–1996)

- Born: 25 February 1920; Bremen
- Died: 10 February 1996 (aged 75); Creil
- Occupation: Novelist, screenwriter
- Works: OSS 117
- Spouse(s): Jean Bruce

Josette Bruce (née Josépha Pyrzbil; also Josette Dourne; (February 25, 1920 – 10 February 1996) was a French novelist of Polish origin. She is remembered for taking over the literary series OSS 117 about secret agent Hubert Bonisseur de La Bath after the death of her husband Jean Bruce, creator of the series, in a car accident in 1963 at the age of 42.

== Biography ==
Born in Poland, she met her future husband, Jean Bruce, on a train. In 1966, three years after she became a widow, she was solicited by the editor of OSS 117 to continue writing the series. Her first book in the series was Les anges de Los Angeles (The angels of Los Angeles).

She secondly married Pierre Dourne, a family friend who served as the inspiration for the recurring character by the name of Peter Dru. After 143 adventures, she wrote her last OSS 117 book, Anathème à Athènes (Anathema in Athens), in 1985. Bruce also wrote mystery novels. During the 1990 Cognac Thriller Film Festival, a tribute was paid to her.

Josette Bruce died in 1996 at age 75. She was buried with her husband in the cemetery of St Peter's Church in Chantilly. Jean Bruce's daughter and step-son created and together wrote the series, New Adventures of OSS 117.

== Selected works ==
=== OSS 117 ===
- Les anges de Los Angeles
- Halte à Malte
- Réseau zéro
- Palmarès à Palomarès
- Congo à gogo
- OSS 117 contre OSS
- Boucan à Bucarest
- Ombres chinoises sur Tanger
- Des pruneaux à Lugano
- Pas de roses à Ispahan
- Détour à Hambourg
- Avanies en Albanie
- Tornade pour OSS 117
- Coup d'état pour OSS 117
- Sarabande à Hong-Kong
- Surprise-partie en Colombie
- Finasseries finlandaises
- Interlude aux Bermudes
- Vacances pour OSS 117
- Médaille d'or pour OSS 117
- Spatiale dernière
- Jeux de malins à Berlin
- OSS 117 récolte la tempête
- Magie blanche pour OSS 117
- Gare aux Bulgares
- Zizanie en Asie
- Un soir en Côte-d'Ivoire
- Dans le mille au Brésil
- La rage au Caire
- Alibi en Libye
- Mission 117 pour OSS 117
- Coup de dingue à St-Domingue
- OSS 117 chez les hippies
- OSS 117 s'expose
- Méli-mélo à Porto-Rico
- OSS 117 en Péril
- OSS 117 traque le traître
- Chassé-croisé pour OSS 117
- OSS 117 joue de la Polonaise
- OSS 117 aime les Portugaises
- OSS 117 voit tout en noir
- OSS 117 malaise en Malaysia
- OSS 117 part en fumée
- Du sang chez les Afghans
- OSS 117 liquide
- Balade en Angola
- Intermède en Suède
- Maldonne à Lisbonne
- Hécatombe pour OSS 117
- Ramdam à Lausanne
- Traîtrise à Venise
- Dérive sur Tananarive
- Péril sur le Nil
- OSS 117 cherche des crosses
- Frénésie à Nicosie
- Sérénade espagnole pour OSS 117
- Matin calme pour OSS 117
- Autopsie en Tunisie
- TNT à la Trinité
- OSS 117 dans le brouillard
- Pleins tubes sur le Danube
- OSS 117 riposte
- OSS 117 sur la brèche
- Plaies et bosses à Mykonos
- OSS 117 aux commandes en Thaîlande
- Tango sur une corde à piano
- Franc et fort à Francfort
- OSS 117 gagne son pari à Paris
- OSS 117 et la bombe de Bombay
- OSS 117 en conflit à Bali
- OSS 117 entre en lice à l'île Maurice
- Plein chaos chez Mao
- Durs à cuire à Curaçao
- Cavalcade à Rio
- Trois maltaises pour OSS 117
- OSS 117 fin prêt à Taipeh
- Ultimatum pour OSS 117
- Rencontres à Ibiza pour OSS 117
- Safari pour OSS 117
- Corps à corps pour OSS 117
- OSS 117 sur un volcan à Abidjan
- OSS 117 pêche en Islande
- Tête de Turc en Turquie
- Coup d'éclat à Prétoria
- OSS 117 dernier sursis en Yougoslavie
- Coup de barre à Bahrein
- OTAN pour OSS 117
- Coup de main pour OSS 117
- Perfidies en Birmanie pour OSS 117
- Dernier round au Cameroun
- Dérapage en Alaska
- Vol de Noël pour OSS 117
- Coup de projecteur pour OSS 117
- Croisière atomique pour OSS 117
- Imbroglio pour OSS 117
- À feu et à sang pour OSS 117
- OSS 117 gagne la belle
- Combat dans l'ombre pour OSS 117
- OSS 117 joue les mercenaires
- Plan d'urgence pour OSS 117
- Choc à Bangkok pour OSS 117
- Panique en Afrique pour OSS 117
- Bagarre au Gabon pour OSS 117
- OSS 117 remporte la palme au Népal
- OSS 117 sème la désunion à la Réunion
- OSS 117 compte les coups
- Déluge à Delhi pour OSS 117
- OSS 117 chez les sorciers
- Coup de masse aux Bahamas
- OSS 117 mise en scène au Sénégal
- Accrochage sur l'Acropole pour OSS 117
- Rallye pour OSS 117
- OSS 117 au finish
- Coup d'arnaque au Danemark
- Sans fleurs ni Floride pour OSS 117
- OSS 117 arrête le massacre
- OSS 117 ne perd pas la tête
- Folies en Italie pour OSS 117
- Alarme en Afrique Australe pour OSS 117
- Salades maltaises pour OSS 117
- Panique à la Martinique pour OSS 117
- Coup de sang à Ceylan pour OSS 117
- Cauchemar irlandais pour OSS 117
- OSS 117 sur un volcan
- Sarabande pour OSS 117
- OSS 117 au Levant
- S.O.S. Brésil pour OSS 117
- California zéro pour OSS 117
- Coup de poker pour OSS 117
- K.O. à Tokyo pour OSS 117
- Casse-tête chinois pour OSS 117
- Pas de pigeon à Venise pour OSS 117
- Hallali en Australie pour OSS 117
- Que viva Mexico OSS 117
- Québec point zéro pour OSS 117
- Commando fantôme pour OSS 117
- Tuerie en Turquie
- L'enfer du désert pour OSS 117
- OSS 117 traqué à l'île de Pâques
- Piège à Berlin pour OSS 117
- Mission pyramides pour OSS 117
- Priorité absolue pour OSS 117
- Anathème à Athènes pour OSS 117

== Bibliography ==
- Williams, Nicola (15 September 2010). France. Lonely Planet. ISBN 978-1-74220-339-3.
