= Paul Cadéac =

French film producer

- Born: 28 June 1918; Agen, France
- Died: 9 January 2004 (aged 85); Paris, France
- Occupation: Producer
- Years active: 1946–1975 (film)

Paul Cadéac (French pronunciation: [pɔl kadeak]; 1918–2004) was a French film producer active in the post-Second World War era. He also directed the 1954 crime film Quay of Blondes. He frequently collaborated with the director André Hunebelle.

== Biography ==
Paul Cadéac produced a large number of successful French popular films of the 1950s and 1960s, mostly directed by André Hunebelle. Paul Cadéac also directed a single feature film, Quai des blondes, in 1954 .

== Selected filmography ==
- Carrefour du crime (1948)
- Quay of Blondes (1954)
- Cadet Rousselle (1954)
- Mannequins of Paris (1956)
- Casino de Paris (1957)
- Les Misérables (1958)
- Shadow of Evil (1964)
- Fantômas se déchaîne (1965)
- OSS 117 Mission for a Killer (1965)
- Atout cœur à Tokyo pour OSS 117 (1966)
- The Two of Us (1967)

== Bibliography ==
- Cowie, Peter & Elley, Derek . World Filmography: 1967. Fairleigh Dickinson University Press, 1977.
- Ivanova, Mariana . Cinema of Collaboration: DEFA Coproductions and International Exchange in Cold War Europe. Berghahn Books, 2019.
- Kermabon, Jacques. Pathé: premier empire du cinéma. Centre Georges Pompidou, 1994.
