= OSS 117 =

Fictional secret agent

Hubert Bonisseur de La Bath
- First appearance: Tu parles d'une ingénue
- Created by: Jean Bruce
- Portrayed by: Ivan Desny; Kerwin Mathews; Frederick Stafford; John Gavin; Luc Merenda; Alan Scott; Jean Dujardin

In-universe information
- Gender: Male
- Occupation: Spy
- Nationality: American/French

OSS 117 is the codename for Hubert Bonisseur de La Bath, a fictional secret agent created by French writer Jean Bruce (and continued by his widow Josette following Bruce's death in a car accident in 1963). Hubert Bonisseur de La Bath is described as being an American Colonel from Louisiana of French descent. After service in the Office of Strategic Services (OSS), de La Bath worked for the Central Intelligence Agency (CIA), then the National Security Council (NSC).

With the revival of the series in 2006, the character is reimagined as a French secret agent working for the Service de Documentation Extérieure et de Contre-Espionnage, the French intelligence agency from 1944 to 1982 (now DGSE).

In real-life, OSS code number 117 was allocated to William L. Langer, who was chief of the Research and Analysis Branch of the OSS.

== Novels and films ==
Bruce wrote 88 OSS 117 novels for the French publishing house Fleuve Noir Espionnage series beginning with Tu parles d'une ingénue (Ici OSS 117) in 1949, predating Ian Fleming's James Bond 007 by four years. After Jean Bruce died in a car accident in 1963, his wife Josette Bruce (signing as "J.Bruce") wrote 143 OSS 117 novels before retiring in 1985. Starting in 1987, Bruce's daughter Martine and her husband François wrote 23 more OSS 117 books. The last published novel was O.S.S. 117 prend le large in 1992.

The first OSS 117 film, OSS 117 Is Not Dead, was made in 1957 with Ivan Desny as OSS 117.

In 1960, the rights to the Jean Bruce novel Documents à vendre, were purchased for filming by Michel Clément as Le Bal des espions (1960). However the rights to the character of OSS 117 had not been agreed upon so the character's name was changed to Brian Cannon, the name of another character from a novel by Jean Bruce, Romance de la Mort.

In the 1960s, the character was featured in a successful Eurospy film series which was mostly directed by André Hunebelle. The role was played initially by Kerwin Mathews, and then by Frederick Stafford, with John Gavin playing the role when Stafford was filming Alfred Hitchcock's Topaz. Before leaving, however, Stafford starred in Atout cœur à Tokyo pour OSS 117 (1966), which is notable for being the first film in the series to use an original storyline instead of adapting a novel, and as such it was penned by James Bond film director Terence Young.

In 1966, Sean Flynn starred in Five Ashore in Singapore, which is an adaptation of an OSS 117 novel written by Jean Bruce. However, as was the case with Le Bal des espions (1960), producer Pierre Kalfon didn't have the rights to the OSS 117 character on the screen, he had to substitute him with an original character instead. The rights to the character on the screen was exclusively optioned by producer Paul Cadéac at the time. Kalfon, however, would purchase the rights to the character years later, resulting in OSS 117 Takes a Vacation (1970), which he co-produced and directed, with Luc Merenda cast in the lead.

After the last film proved unsuccessful, the series attempted to transition to the small screen by producing a pilot for a potential television series with Alan Scott cast as the secret agent. However, it wasn't picked up by the networks and was eventually released as a standalone television film, entitled OSS 117 tue le taon (1971). It retained the use of novels as a source material which was adapted to a teleplay from the book of the same name by the author's wife, Josette Bruce.

=== Parodies ===
Director Michel Hazanavicius and screenwriter Jean-François Halin revived the series as a spoof of the EuroSpy genre that faithfully parodied the original films, even going as far to paying several homages to the action-adventure films from the 1950s and the 1960s as well as recreating the atmospheric feel of those productions. Its technical and visual influences are drawn from the early James Bond films starring Sean Connery as well as the original OSS 117 films directed by André Hunebelle. Additionally, Alfred Hitchcock's films also serve as major inspirations for the cinematography and the visual effects.

Starring actor-comedian Jean Dujardin in the titular role, this incarnation of the character is reinvented as a French spy working for the SDECE, who's portrayed as a self-important, dim-witted and politically incorrect oaf. He's generally depicted as quintessentially "franchouillard" (typically French), though revealed to be of Belgian descent. As a comical character, he often creates awkward social situations due to his colonial ideology, staunch French patriotism, chauvinism and machismo. At the same time, he embodies the ideal secret agent archetype: Handsome, physically adept (he loves fighting and dances everything from the mambo to the twist), and uses his charm to seduce quite a few women. When an ally mispronounces his codename, he eccentrically corrects him with the proper pronunciation—One Hundred and Seventeen ("cent dix-sept" in French) as opposed to Double One Seven (a light jab at James Bond's 00-prefix). Despite the character name and overall intellectual property, these films share little to nothing with Bruce's novels.

The first two films, OSS 117: Cairo, Nest of Spies (2006) and OSS 117: Lost in Rio (2009), are both directed by Hazanavicius and co-written with Halin. However, for the third film, Hazanavicius chose not to return due to creative differences with Halin regarding the script. Instead, Nicolas Bedos took over the directing duties and worked closely with Halin on adapting his screenplay, resulting in OSS 117: From Africa with Love (2021), which, unlike the first two films, opts for contemporary filming techniques rather than emulating the vintage look of the older films of the era they supposedly represent.

== List of film adaptations ==
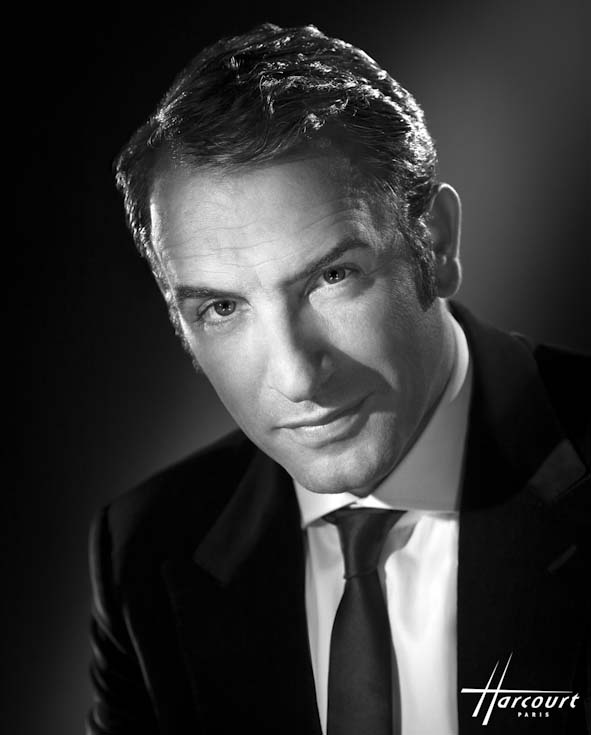
Jean Dujardin portrays OSS 117 in the revival series.

=== Original series ===
- OSS 117 n'est pas mort (OSS 117 Is Not Dead), 1956, directed by Jean Sacha, starring Ivan Desny as Hubert Bonisseur de La Bath/OSS 117
- OSS 117 se déchaîne (OSS 117), 1963, directed by André Hunebelle, starring Kerwin Mathews
- Banco à Bangkok pour OSS 117 (Shadow of Evil or Panic in Bangkok), 1964, directed by André Hunebelle, starring Kerwin Mathews
- Furia à Bahia pour OSS 117 (OSS 117: Mission for a Killer), 1965, directed by André Hunebelle & Jacques Besnard, starring Frederick Stafford
- Atout coeur à Tokyo pour OSS 117 (Terror in Tokyo), 1966, directed by Michel Boisrond, starring Frederick Stafford
- Pas de roses pour OSS 117 (OSS 117 Double agent), 1968, directed by André Hunebelle, Renzo Cerrato & Jean-Pierre Desagnat, starring John Gavin
- OSS 117 takes a vacation (OSS 117 takes a vacation), 1970, directed by Pierre Kalfon, starring Luc Merenda
- OSS 117 tue le taon [TV], 1971, directed by André Lerouxs, starring Alan Scott

=== Revival ===
- OSS 117: Le Caire nid d'espions (OSS 117: Cairo, Nest of Spies), 2006, directed by Michel Hazanavicius, starring Jean Dujardin
- OSS 117: Rio ne répond plus (OSS 117: Lost in Rio), 2009, directed by Michel Hazanavicius, starring Jean Dujardin
- OSS 117: Alerte Rouge en Afrique Noire (OSS 117: From Africa With Love), 2021, directed by Nicolas Bedos, starring Jean Dujardin
