= Two Worlds (2007 film) =

Les deux mondes
- Theatrical release poster
- Directed by: Daniel Cohen
- Written by: Daniel Cohen; Jean-Marc Culiersi; Eva Maria Peters
- Produced by: Benoît Jaubert; Mathieu Kassovitz
- Starring: Benoît Poelvoorde
- Distributed by: Gaumont
- Release date: 21 November 2007
- Running time: 1h 45min
- Country: France
- Language: French
- Budget: $19.2 million
- Box office: $9.1 million

Two Worlds (French: Les deux mondes) is a 2007 French comedy film directed by Daniel Cohen.

== Cast ==
- Benoît Poelvoorde as Rémy Bassano
- Natacha Lindinger as Lucile
- Michel Duchaussoy as Mutr van Kimé
- Daniel Cohen as Rimé Kiel
- Pascal Elso as Serge Vitali
- Arly Jover as Delphine
- Augustin Legrand as Kerté / Zotan
- Mathias Mlekuz as Bali
- Zofia Moreno as Cara
- Catherine Mouchet as La libraire
- Florence Loiret Caille as Omi
- Stefano Accorsi as Antoine Geller
- Audrey Fleurot as Boubs
