= Michel Hazanavicius =

French filmmaker (born 1967)

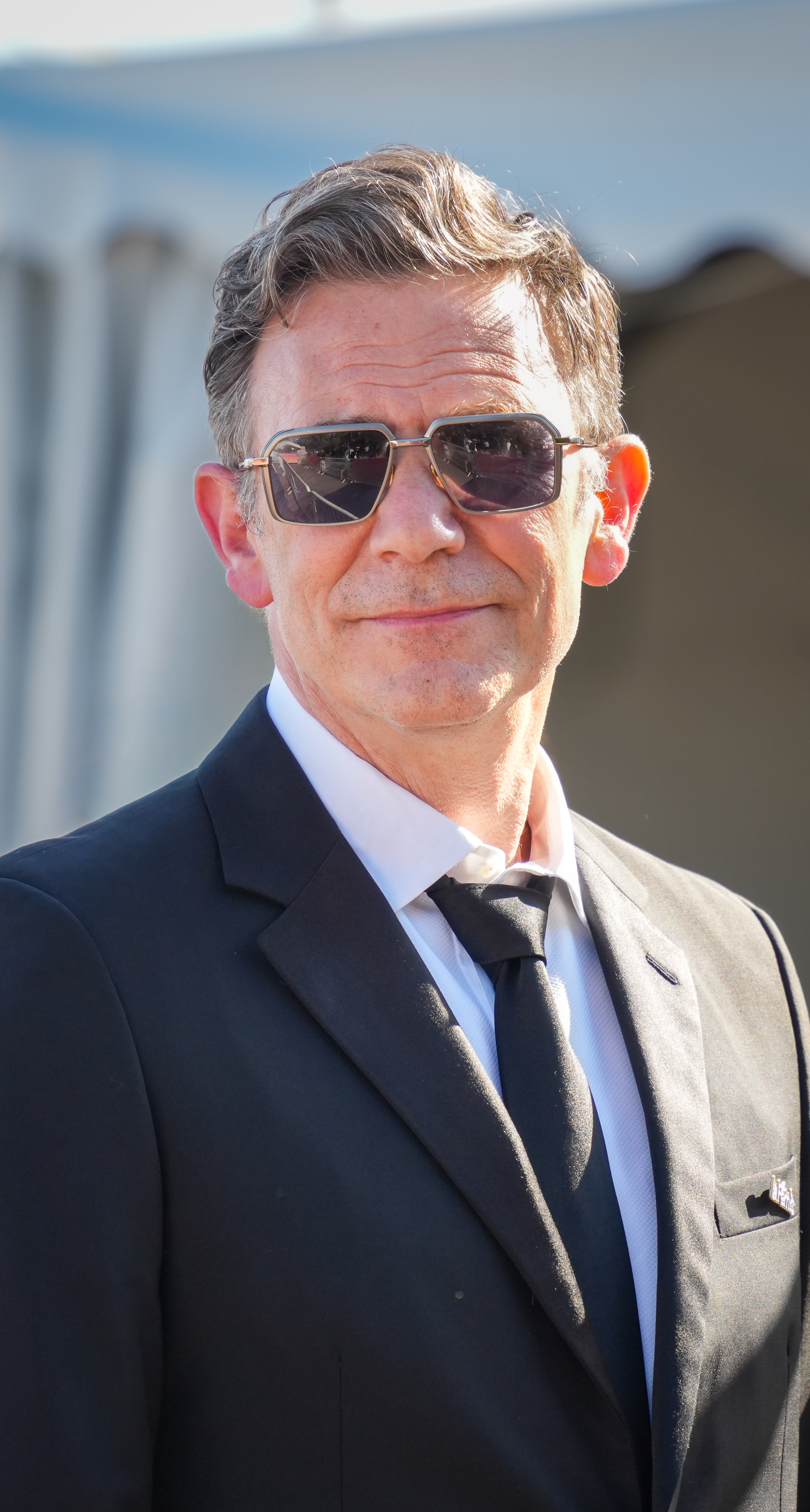
- Hazanavicius in 2026
- Born: 29 March 1967 (age 59); Paris, France
- Education: École nationale supérieure d'arts de Cergy-Pontoise
- Occupation: Film director
- Years active: 1988–present
- Spouse: Bérénice Bejo
- Children: 4
- Awards: Academy Award for Best Director; BAFTA for Best Director; César Award for Best Director and other see awards

Michel Hazanavicius (French: [mi.ʃɛl a.za.na.vi.sjys] Lithuanian: Hazanavičius; born 29 March 1967) is a French film director, screenwriter, editor, and producer. He is best known for his 2011 film, The Artist, that won the Best Picture and the Best Director at the 84th Academy Awards. He also directed spy film parodies OSS 117: Cairo, Nest of Spies (2006) and OSS 117: Lost in Rio (2009).

== Early life ==
Hazanavicius was born in Paris. His family is Jewish, and originally from Lithuania. His grandparents were from both Poland and Lithuania and settled in France in the 1920s.

== Career ==
Before directing films, Hazanavicius worked in television, beginning with the Canal+ channel, where he started as a director in 1988. He began directing commercials for companies such as Reebok and Bouygues Telecom, and then, in 1993, he made his first feature-length film, La Classe américaine, for television. The film, co-directed with Dominique Mézerette, consisted entirely of footage taken from various films produced by the Warner Bros. studio, re-edited and dubbed into French. In 1997, Hazanavicius directed his first short film, Echec au capital, and followed it up with his first theatrically released feature, Mes amis, which starred his brother, actor Serge Hazanavicius.

Seven years later, Hazanavicius wrote and directed his second feature, OSS 117: Cairo, Nest of Spies, a parody of 1960s spy movies and specifically of OSS 117, a popular character created by Jean Bruce in 1949. The $17.5 million film was a modest box office success, with $23 million worldwide receipts. A sequel, OSS 117: Lost in Rio, followed in 2009. Both films were later distributed in the United States by Music Box Films.

The Artist, a black and white film without dialogue which takes place in Hollywood on the eve of sound film, screened in competition at the 2011 Cannes International Film Festival. The Artist was later released to universal acclaim. On 24 January 2012 Hazanavicius received nominations for three Oscars: the Academy Awards for Best Director, Best Original Screenplay and Best Film Editing. Hazanavicius said winning an Oscar would be "like dreaming of going to the moon – you don't really believe it could ever happen." Hazanavicius won the Academy Award for Best Director for The Artist, at the 84th Academy Awards. He was invited to join the Academy of Motion Picture Arts and Sciences in June 2012 along with 175 other individuals.

He contributed a section to the omnibus film The Players (Les Infidèles) starring Jean Dujardin. He then announced that his next feature film would be a remake of the 1948 Fred Zinnemann film The Search. The film stars Berenice Bejo in the Montgomery Clift role as an NGO worker helping a little boy find his family in modern-day Chechnya and was produced by Thomas Langmann. Golden Globe Award actress winner Annette Bening also stars in the film.

== Personal life ==
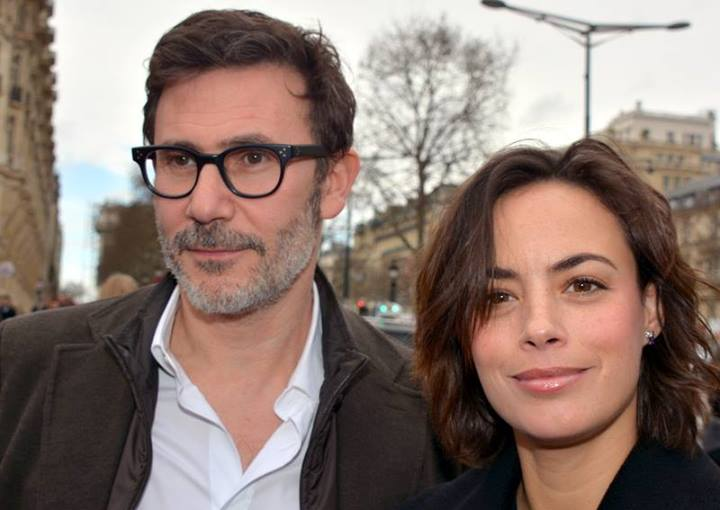
Hazanavicius and Bérénice Bejo.

Hazanavicius was in a relationship with film director Virginia Lovisone, and they have two daughters together, Simone and Fantine. He is also the father of actress Raika Hazanavicius with former actress and now costume designer and drama teacher Julie Mauduech. He is married to Bérénice Bejo, who acted in his films OSS 117: Cairo, Nest of Spies, The Artist and The Search. Hazanavicius and Bejo have two children together: Lucien and Gloria.

== Filmography ==
=== Feature films ===
Year	English Title	Original title	Notes
1999	Mes amis		
2006	OSS 117: Cairo, Nest of Spies	OSS 117 : Le Caire, nid d'espions	
2009	OSS 117: Lost in Rio	OSS 117 : Rio ne répond plus	
2011	The Artist		
2012	The Players	Les Infidèles	Omnibus film
2014	The Search		Remake of The Search
2017	Redoubtable	Le Redoutable	
2020	The Lost Prince	Le prince oublié	
2022	Final Cut	Coupez!	
2024	The Most Precious of Cargoes	La Plus Précieuse des marchandises	Animated film
TBA	The Third Hand		Post-production

=== Short films ===
Year(s)	Title
1997	Echec au capital

=== Television ===
Year(s)	Title	Notes
1992	Derrick contre Superman	Television short
1992	Ca détourne	Television movie
1993	La Classe américaine	Television movie
1994	C'est pas le 20 heures	Television series
1996	Les films qui sortent le lendemain dans les salles de cinéma	Documentary television series

== Awards ==
Award	Year	Category	Film	Result
Academy Awards	2012	Best Director	The Artist	Won
Academy Awards	2012	Best Original Screenplay	The Artist	Nominated
Academy Awards	2012	Best Film Editing	The Artist	Nominated
Alliance of Women Film Journalists	2012	Best Director	The Artist	Won
Alliance of Women Film Journalists	2012	Best Original Screenplay	The Artist	Nominated
Alliance of Women Film Journalists	2012	Best Editing	The Artist	Nominated
Australian Academy of Cinema and Television Arts (AACTA)	2012	Best Direction – International	The Artist	Won
Australian Academy of Cinema and Television Arts (AACTA)	2012	Best Screenplay – International	The Artist	Nominated
BAFTA Award	2012	Best Director	The Artist	Won
BAFTA Award	2012	Best Original Screenplay	The Artist	Won
BAFTA Award	2012	Best Editing	The Artist	Nominated
Boston Society of Film Critics Award	2011	Best Director	The Artist	Nominated
Cannes Film Festival	2011	Palme d'Or	The Artist	Nominated
César Awards	2008	Best Adaptation	OSS 117: Cairo, Nest of Spies	Nominated
César Awards	2012	Best Director	The Artist	Won
César Awards	2012	Best Original Screenplay	The Artist	Nominated
César Awards	2012	Best Editing	The Artist	Nominated
César Awards	2018	Best Director	Redoubtable	Nominated
César Awards	2018	Best Adaptation	Redoubtable	Nominated
Chicago Film Critics Association	2012	Best Director	The Artist	Nominated
Chicago Film Critics Association	2012	Best Original Screenplay	The Artist	Won
Critics' Choice Movie Awards	2012	Best Director	The Artist	Won
Critics' Choice Movie Awards	2012	Best Original Screenplay	The Artist	Nominated
Critics' Choice Movie Awards	2012	Best Editing	The Artist	Nominated
Denver Film Critics Society	2012	Best Director (tied with Terrence Malick)	The Artist	Won
Detroit Film Critics Society	2011	Best Director	The Artist	Won
Detroit Film Critics Society	2011	Best Screenplay	The Artist	Nominated
Directors Guild Awards	2012	Outstanding Achievement in Directing in a Theatrical Release	The Artist	Won
Etoiles d'or Award	2012	Best Director	The Artist	Won
Florida Film Critics Circle	2011	Best Original Screenplay	The Artist	Won
Golden Globe Awards	2012	Best Director – Motion Picture	The Artist	Nominated
Golden Globe Awards	2012	Best Screenplay	The Artist	Nominated
Houston Film Critics Society	2011	Best Director	The Artist	Nominated
Houston Film Critics Society	2011	Best Screenplay	The Artist	Nominated
Houston Film Critics Society	2011	Best Foreign Film	The Artist	Nominated
Independent Spirit Awards	2012	Best Director	The Artist	Won
Independent Spirit Awards	2012	Best Screenplay	The Artist	Nominated
London Film Critics' Circle	2012	Director of the Year	The Artist	Won
London Film Critics' Circle	2012	Screenwriter of the Year	The Artist	Nominated
New York Film Critics Circle Awards	2011	Best Director	The Artist	Won
New York Film Critics Online	2011	Best Director	The Artist	Won
Oklahoma Film Critics Circle	2011	Best Director	The Artist	Won
Oklahoma Film Critics Circle	2011	Best Original Screenplay	The Artist	Won
Online Film Critics Society	2012	Best Director	The Artist	Nominated
Phoenix Film Critics Society	2011	Best Director	The Artist	Won
Phoenix Film Critics Society	2011	Best Original Screenplay	The Artist	Won
Phoenix Film Critics Society	2011	Best Film Editing	The Artist	Won
Phoenix Film Critics Society	2011	Breakthrough Behind The Camera	The Artist	Won
Satellite Awards	2011	Best Director	The Artist	Nominated
Satellite Awards	2011	Best Original Screenplay	The Artist	Nominated
Seattle International Film Festival	2006	Seattle International Film Festival Golden Space Needle Award	OSS 117: Cairo, Nest of Spies	Won
Tokyo International Film Festival	2006	Tokyo International Film Festival Tokyo Grand Prix	OSS 117: Cairo, Nest of Spies	Won
Globes de Cristal Award	2007	Globes de Cristal Award for Best Film	OSS 117: Cairo, Nest of Spies	Nominated
Vancouver Film Critics Circle	2011	Best Director	The Artist	Nominated
Vancouver Film Critics Circle	2011	Best Screenplay	The Artist	Won
Washington D.C. Area Film Critics Association	2011	Best Director	The Artist	Nominated

== See also ==
- List of French Academy Award winners and nominees
