= Jean Bruce =

French writer

Jean Bruce (22 March 1921 – 26 March 1963), born Jean Brochet, was a prolific French popular writer. He also wrote under the pseudonyms of Jean Alexandre, Jean Alexandre Brochet, Jean-Martin Rouan, and Joyce Lindsay. He died in a car accident in 1963 at the age of 42.

He is particularly known for the adventures of secret agent Hubert Bonisseur de La Bath, aka OSS 117, of which many novels were adapted for the screen in the 1960s. Bruce's first OSS 117 novel appeared in 1949. He wrote prolifically with 91 OSS 117 novels and many others in 14 years, before his death in a Jaguar sports car crash. Though the first OSS 117 Is Not Dead film with Ivan Desny in the lead was already made in 1957, a popular series of several OSS 117 films started no earlier than in 1963, following the French release of Dr. No, with Kerwin Mathews in two, director André Hunebelle's discovery Frederick Stafford in two more, John Gavin in one (replacing Stafford who was starring in Alfred Hitchcock's Topaz, then with Luc Merenda and Alan Scott in two in the 1970s that were French made for TV films.

In 2006 the action spoof, OSS 117: Cairo, Nest of Spies starring Jean Dujardin as OSS 117 became a surprise international hit. In 2009 a sequel was released called OSS 117: Lost in Rio and in 2021 a third spoof starring Jean Dujardin, called OSS 117: From Africa with Love was released. All are in French with English subtitles.

After his death, his wife Josette Bruce continued to write 143 new titles for the OSS 117 character beginning in 1966 until 1985. Afterward their son and daughter François and Martine Bruce wrote 24 books, from 1987 till 1992. Josette died in 1996.

Films of some of Bruce's other books such as Le vicomte règle ses comptes (The Viscount) with Kerwin Mathews and Cinq Gars pour Singapour (Five Ashore in Singapore) with Sean Flynn were made.

Jean-Paul Belmondo played both a writer like Jean Bruce and had a OSS 117-like creation in Philippe de Broca's Le Magnifique.
