= Nicolas Bedos =

French comedian, writer, director and actor (born 1979)

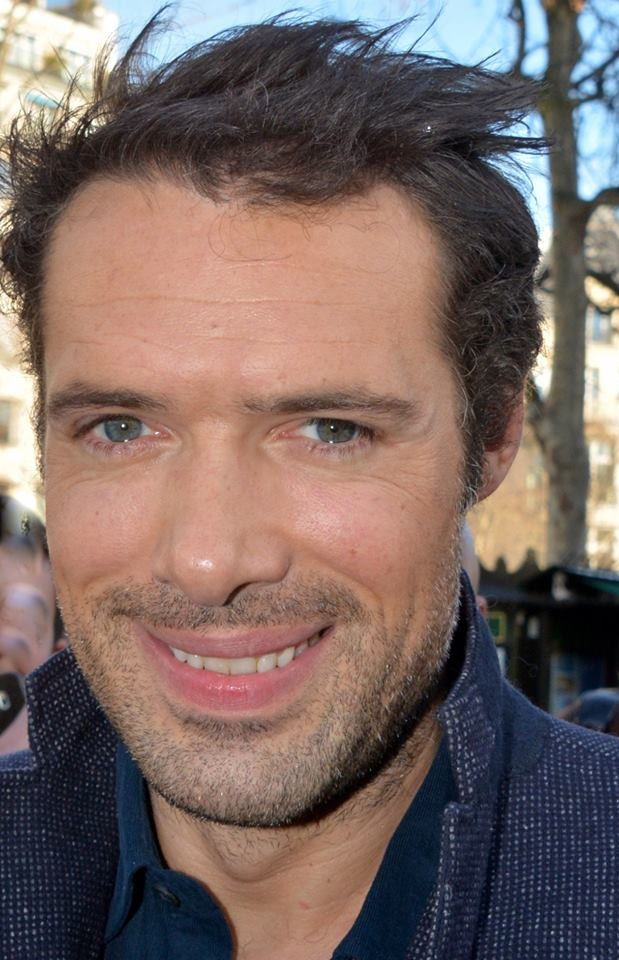
- Bedos in 2018
- Born: Nicolas Simon Bedos; 21 April 1979 (age 47); Neuilly-sur-Seine, France
- Occupations: Theatre director, actor, comedian, film director, screenwriter
- Years active: 2004–present
- Parent(s): Guy Bedos (father); Joëlle Bercot (mother)
- Relatives: Victoria Bedos (sister)

Nicolas Simon Bedos (French: [nikɔla simɔ̃ bədos]; born 21 April 1979) is a French comedian, writer, director and actor.

The son of Guy Bedos, he became known in 2004 as a playwright. In 2013, he joined Laurent Ruquier's late-night On n'est pas couché television talk show as a satirist, which he left two years later. His first film, Mr. & Mrs. Adelman, premiered in 2017. On 22 October 2024, a Paris court sentenced Bedos to one in year in jail, with six months suspended, and required addiction and psychological therapy after he was convicted of sexually assaulting two women in 2023.

== Filmography ==
=== As actor ===
Year	Title	Role	Notes
2010	Ni reprise, ni échangée	Jean-Pierre	TV movie; also writer
2011	Bouquet final	Antoine	TV movie; also writer
2011	Love Lasts Three Years	Antoine	
2012	Populaire	Gilbert Japy	
2013	Le Débarquement	Various	Sketches
2013	Love Is in the Air	Antoine	Also writer
2014	The Easy Way Out	Louis	
2016	L'Invitation	Léo	
2017	Mr & Mme Adelman	Victor de Richemont dit Adelman	Also director, writer and composer

=== As filmmaker ===
Year	Title	Role	Notes
2006	Sortie de scène	Writer	TV movie
2009	Folie douce	Writer	TV movie
2010	Ni reprise, ni échangée	Writer	TV movie
2011	Bouquet final	Writer	TV movie
2012	The Players	Writer	
2013	Love Is in the Air	Writer	
2015	Encore heureux	Writer	
2017	Mr & Mme Adelman	Director, writer, composer	Nominated—César Award for Best First Feature Film
2019	La Belle Époque	Director, writer, composer	Nominated—César Award for Best Director
2021	OSS 117: Alerte Rouge en Afrique Noire	Director, writer, composer	Cameo appearance
2022	Masquerade	Director, writer, composer	
2023	Alphonse	Director, writer	TV series (6 episodes)

== Theatre ==
Year	Title	Notes
2004	Sortie de scène	Nominated—Molière de la meilleure pièce de création
2007	Eva	
2009	Le Voyage de Victor	
2010	Promenade de santé	

== Columnist ==
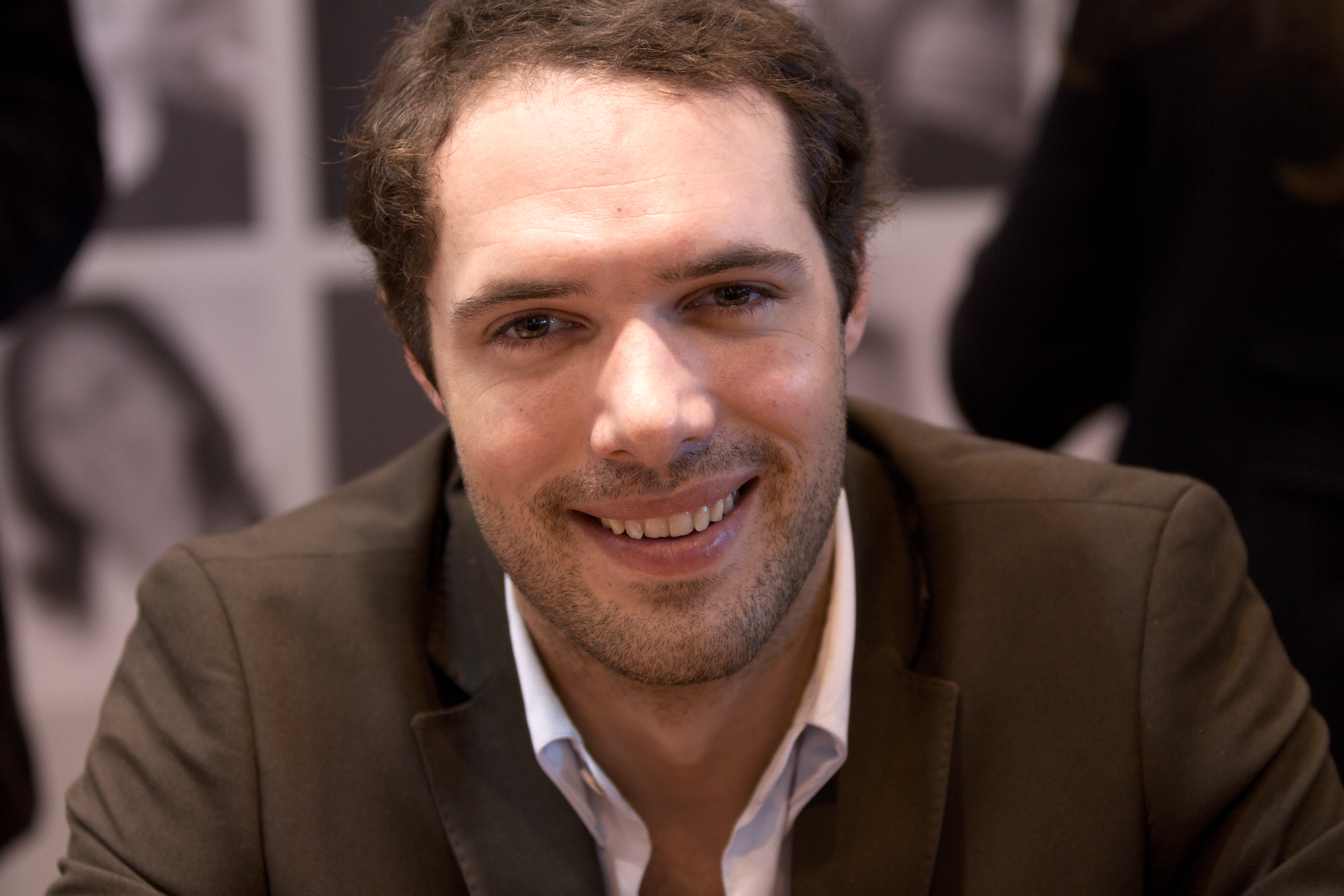
Nicolas Bedos in March 2010.

=== Publication ===
Year	Title
2009–2010	L'Officiel
August 2011 – April 2013	Marianne
August 2013 – June 2013	Elle

=== Television ===
Year	Title
September 2010 – May 2011	Semaine critique !
November 2012	Vous trouvez ça normal ?!
September 2013 – June 2015	On n'est pas couché

=== Radio ===
Year	Title
November 2009 – June 2010	La Semaine Mythomane (Ouï FM)

== Legal convictions ==
=== Public insults and drunk driving ===
In March 2011, he spoke on French TV about two nights he spent in police custody. During his testimony, he called the policemen from these nights "odious cops". He also talked about all policemen in general and used the terms "IQ of a dead octopus" or "morons, thugs in uniform, scum who have fallen to the good side". The Minister of the Interior (France) filed a complaint, and Bedos was convicted in 2012 to a 2000 euros fine by the Paris criminal court for public insults towards the police. In 2014, he was sentenced to three months in prison and a 750 euro fine for drunk driving, insulting and threatening to kill police officers after falling off his scooter.

=== Conviction for sexual assault ===
In 2023, he was released from police custody for sexual assault on a 25-year-old woman in a nightclub. He was also summoned to court for sexual harassment committed in 2018. His trial is scheduled for 26 September 2024. On 22 October 2024, he was sentenced to 1 year in jail. The actor denied being a sexual aggressor but talked instead of an "onerous friendliness" mixed with alcoholism. He was the first actor in France sentenced to jail for sexual offenses.
