= List of French films of 1999 =

A list of films produced in France in 1999.

Title	Director	Cast	Genre	Notes
Astérix et Obélix contre César	Claude Zidi	Christian Clavier, Gérard Depardieu, Roberto Benigni, Laetitia Casta	Comedy	3 wins
Babel	Gérard Pullicino	Mitchell David Rothpan, Maria de Medeiros, Michel Jonasz, Tchéky Karyo	Fantasy, adventure	
Beau Travail	Claire Denis	Denis Lavant, Michel Subor	Drama	
The Color of Lies	Claude Chabrol	Sandrine Bonnaire, Jacques Gamblin		Entered into the 49th Berlin International Film Festival
The Dilettante	Pascal Thomas	Catherine Frot	Comedy	Entered into the 21st Moscow International Film Festival
East/West	Régis Wargnier	Sandrine Bonnaire, Oleg Menshikov, Catherine Deneuve	Drama	
Les Enfants du Siècle	Diane Kurys	Juliette Binoche, Benoît Magimel	Biography drama	
Farewell, Home Sweet Home	Otar Iosseliani			Screened at the 1999 Cannes Film Festival
Girl on the Bridge	Patrice Leconte	Vanessa Paradis, Daniel Auteuil	Romantic drama	Nominated for BAFTA, +5 wins, +12 nom.
Humanité	Bruno Dumont	Séverine Caneele		Won three awards at Cannes
It All Starts Today	Bertrand Tavernier	Philippe Torreton		Entered into the 49th Berlin International Film Festival
Karnaval	Thomas Vincent	Sylvie Testud		Entered into the 49th Berlin International Film Festival
Mauvaises fréquentations	Jean-Pierre Améris	Maud Forget, Lou Doillon	Romantic drama	1 win & 1 nomination
The Messenger: The Story of Joan of Arc	Luc Besson	Milla Jovovich, Dustin Hoffman	Biography drama	5 wins & 10 nominations
Nadia and the Hippos	Dominique Cabrera	Ariane Ascaride		Screened at the 1999 Cannes Film Festival
New Dawn	Émilie Deleuze	Samuel Le Bihan		Screened at the 1999 Cannes Film Festival
Our Happy Lives	Jacques Maillot	Marie Payen, Cécile Richard		Entered into the 1999 Cannes Film Festival
The Passengers	Jean-Claude Guiguet	Fabienne Babe, Philippe Garziano		Screened at the 1999 Cannes Film Festival
Peut-être	Cédric Klapisch	Jean-Paul Belmondo, Romain Duris	Science fiction	
Pola X	Leos Carax	Guillaume Depardieu, Yekaterina Golubeva	Romantic drama	2 wins & 2 nominations
Princes et princesses	Michel Ocelot	Arlette Mirapeu, Philippe Cheytion, Yves Barsacq	Fairy tale	Released in January 2000
Romance	Catherine Breillat	Caroline Ducey	Drama	
Rosetta	Jean-Pierre and Luc Dardenne	Émilie Dequenne	Drama	8 wins & 5 nominations
Time Regained	Raoul Ruiz	Catherine Deneuve, Emmanuelle Béart	Drama	2 wins & 2 nominations
Venus Beauty Institute	Tonie Marshall	Nathalie Baye	Comedy drama	7 wins & 3 nominations
Why Not Me?	Stéphane Giusti	Amira Casar, Bruno Putzulu	Comedy	Best Lesbian Feature at the Seattle Lesbian & Gay Film Festival
