= Pierre Palmade =

French actor and comedian (born 1968)

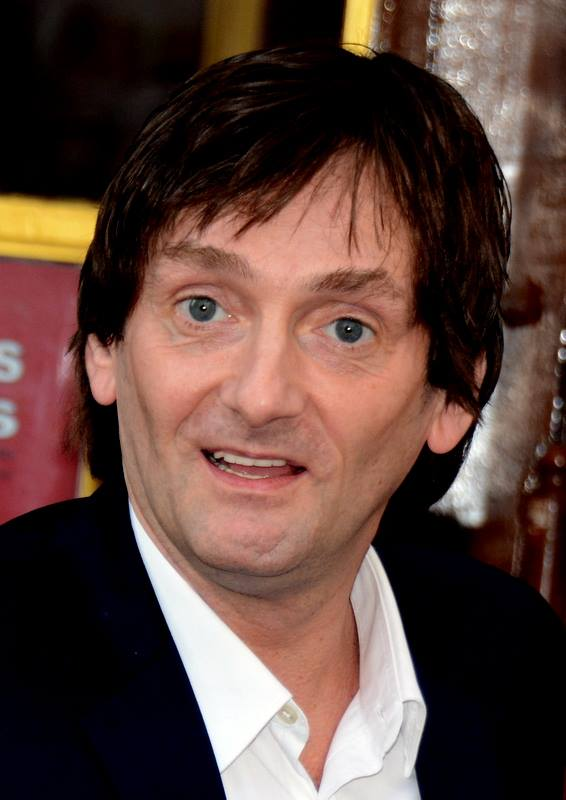
- Palmade at the 2014 Molière Awards
- Born: 23 March 1968 (age 58); Bordeaux, France
- Occupations: Humorist, comedian, actor
- Spouse: Véronique Sanson (m. 1995; div. 2004)

Pierre Palmade (born 23 March 1968) is a French actor, comedian, stage director and playwright.

== Biography ==
Pierre Palmade began his career in sketch comedy shows on stage and on television in the late 1980s, and in the 1990s he wrote and played his own stand-up acts. His signature humor was to portray unpleasant or irritating characters in his sketches. Palmade also wrote several plays with Muriel Robin, with whom they were notable in the 1990s for their play Ils s'aiment and its sequel Ils se sont aimés, both directed by Muriel Robin and played on stage by Palmade and Michèle Laroque. For his theater work, Palmade has been nominated several times for the Molière Awards.

In the late 1990s and 2000s, Palmade played in several films and TV series. In 2005, he participated in Rendez-vous en terre inconnue. He also worked as a writer for the films Pédale douce and Pédale dure. In 2007, he was the host of sketch comedy television show Made in Palmade; the following year, he wrote the play Le comique, which he played on stage with fellow actors from Made in Palmade and was followed by a sequel, Le Fils du Comique with Anne-Élisabeth Blateau at Théâtre Saint-Georges in Paris. In 2008, Palmade starred in the biographical film Sagan, a dramatization of the life of novelist Françoise Sagan directed by Diane Kurys, in which Palmade plays the role of dancer and socialite Jacques Chazot.

In 2010, after a ten-year hiatus from on-stage solo performances, Palmade came back with a new show J'ai jamais été aussi vieux. That same year, Palmade wrote the sketch comedy Le Grand Restaurant, featuring various celebrities such as Palmade, Anne-Élisabeth Blateau, Gérard Depardieu, François Berléand and Jean Rochefort. The prime-time television show was followed by three sequels, as of 2022. In 2018, Palmade wrote the play Paprika, played on stage at Théâtre de la Madeleine by Victoria Abril and Jean-Baptiste Maunier.

== Personal life ==
Palmade was married to singer Véronique Sanson from 1995 to 2004. In October 2008, Palmade came out as gay, his homosexuality was one of the topics of his 2010 autobiographical show J'ai jamais été aussi vieux.

In an interview in 2019, after being arrested for drug use, he publicly admitted he suffered from drug addiction, declaring: "Cocaine has ruined my life since I was 20".

== Legal issues ==
=== False rape accusation and drug charges ===
On 12 April 2019, early in the morning, Palmade reportedly called the police, telling them that a nineteen-year-old man, who was in Palmade's home in Paris, was damaging his property. When the police arrived, the young man told he was acting in self-defense, and in turn accused Palmade of raping him. Both men were put in custody.

Later that day, Palmade's accuser admitted to making a false accusation of rape and Palmade was released from custody. However, the investigation into the incident led to Palmade being indicted for drug-related charges, to which he immediately pleaded guilty. In June, Palmade (who was previously convicted of cocaine use in 1995) was sentenced to a €1,500 fine for his drug charges. His accuser was himself charged with drug use and criminal damage, and in October he was issued a three-month suspended sentence and a €500 fine.

=== Car accident, health and legal issues ===
On 10 February 2023, Palmade was involved in a car accident, colliding head-on with another vehicle travelling on the other lane near Villiers-en-Bière in the south of Seine-et-Marne. Palmade was driving one of the vehicles, while the man who was driving the other vehicle was with his six-year-old son and his pregnant sister-in-law; all were seriously injured. Palmade was sent in critical condition to Bicêtre Hospital, but recovered the next day. Due to trauma of the accident, the female victim, who was more than six months pregnant, was taken to the hospital, where she had an emergency caesarean section which eventually resulted in the death of her baby.

While Palmade was hospitalized, investigation found that he was driving under the influence of cocaine at the time of the accident. The investigation also found that two other passengers were in Palmade's car during the accident, and were wanted by the police for questioning.

On 15 February, police took Palmade into custody where he confessed to using drugs before the accident. On 17 February, it was reported that Palmade was indicted for severe bodily injury and involuntary manslaughter, (Note: The charge of "involuntary manslaughter" regards the death of the infant who was in the pregnant passenger's womb at the time of the accident.) and that he would be put under electronic tagging while being confined at a residential treatment center. On the same day, the two men who were in Palmade's car during the accident were put into custody and questioned by the police. They recounted that after the accident, they got out of Palmade's car and had walked away from the scene.

On the same day, a man contacted police and told them that Palmade was in possession of child pornography, which led to an investigation. Three days later, another man contacted police and the media, claiming he had proof that Palmade possessed child pornography. A raid made at Palmade's home in Paris, and his house in Seine-et-Marne, found no illegal material.

On 25 February, it was reported that Palmade suffered a stroke and was transferred to Bicêtre Hospital. Two days later, Palmade was due to be put on remand while recovering from his stroke. On the same day, it was reported that the female victim's life was no longer in danger, but her brother-in-law and his son remained in critical condition. On 14 March, the Court of Appeal of Paris declared that Palmade was no longer on remand, but would be kept under judicial supervision, and forbidden from leaving hospital.

Because of Palmade's notoriety, the circumstances of the accident and subsequent revelations and speculation over his lifestyle, the accident received significant media coverage in France during February 2023. On 20 November 2024, Palmade was sentenced to 5 years in prison, including 2 years without remission.

On 16 April 2025, he was released from prison to execute his sentence with an electronic tagging.

== Stage plays ==
- Ils s'aiment (1996, co-written with Muriel Robin)
- Ils se sont aimés (2001, co-written with Muriel Robin)
- Le Comique (2008)
- Pierre et Fils, with Pierre Richard, violin Scott Tixier, music Christophe Defays TF1 (2008)
- J'ai jamais été aussi vieux (2010)
- Le fils du comique (2013)
- Ils se re-aiment (2016)
- Paprika (2018)
- Assume, bordel ! (2020)

== Filmography ==
=== Film ===
- Oui, directed by Alexandre Jardin (1996) : Octave
- Asterix and Obelix vs. Caesar, directed by Claude Zidi (1999) : Cacofonix
- Asterix and the Vikings, (voice), directed by Stefan Fjeldmark (2006) : Cryptograf
- Sagan, directed by Diane Kurys, with Sylvie Testud (2008) : Jacques Chazot
- Incognito, directed by Éric Lavaine (2009) : Himself
- Brillantissime, directed by Michèle Laroque (2018) : the third patient

=== Television ===
- H : Himself (1999)
- Hero Corp : Hoger (2010)
- Scènes de ménages : the enamored client (2012)
- Astrid et Raphaëlle : Guillaume Delerue (2021)

== Bibliography ==
- « Traînée de poudre », in Hallier, tout feu tout flamme, Jean-Pierre Thiollet, Neva Editions, 2023, p. 73. ISBN 978-2290353745
