= Danse avec les stars season 9 =

Danse avec les stars
- Season 9
- No. of episodes: 10

Release
- Original network: TF1
- Original release: 29 September – 1 December 2018

Season chronology
- ← Previous; Season 8 Next → Season 10

The ninth season of the French version of Strictly Come Dancing started in October 2018 on TF1. It was hosted by Camille Combal and Karine Ferri. Nico Archambault did not reprise his role as judge and was replaced by Patrick Dupond. Fauve Hautot also left the panel of the judges to return as a dancer and was replaced by the winner of the 2nd season, Shy'm. Jean-Marc Généreux and Chris Marques both returned as judges.

== Participants ==
Celebrity	Occupation / known for	Professional partner	Status
Carla Ginola	Social media personality	Jordan Mouillerac	Eliminated 1st & 2nd on October 6, 2018
Anouar Toubali	Actor	Emmanuelle Berne	Eliminated 1st & 2nd on October 6, 2018
Vincent Moscato	Former rugby union player & radio presenter	Candice Pascal	Eliminated 3rd on October 13, 2018
Lio	Singer & actress	Christian Millette	Eliminated 4th on October 20, 2018
Basile Boli	Former footballer	Katrina Patchett	Eliminated 5th on October 27, 2018
Jeanfi Janssens	Comedian	Marie Denigot	Eliminated 6th on November 3, 2018
Pamela Anderson	Actress & former Playboy model	Maxime Dereymez	Eliminated 7th on November 8, 2018
Héloïse Martin	Actress	Christophe Licata	Eliminated 8th on November 17, 2018
Terence Telle	Model	Fauve Hautot	Third place on November 24, 2018
Iris Mittenaere	Miss France 2016 & Miss Universe 2016	Anthony Colette	Second place on December 1, 2018
Clément Rémiens	Demain nous appartient actor	Denitsa Ikonomova	Winners on December 1, 2018

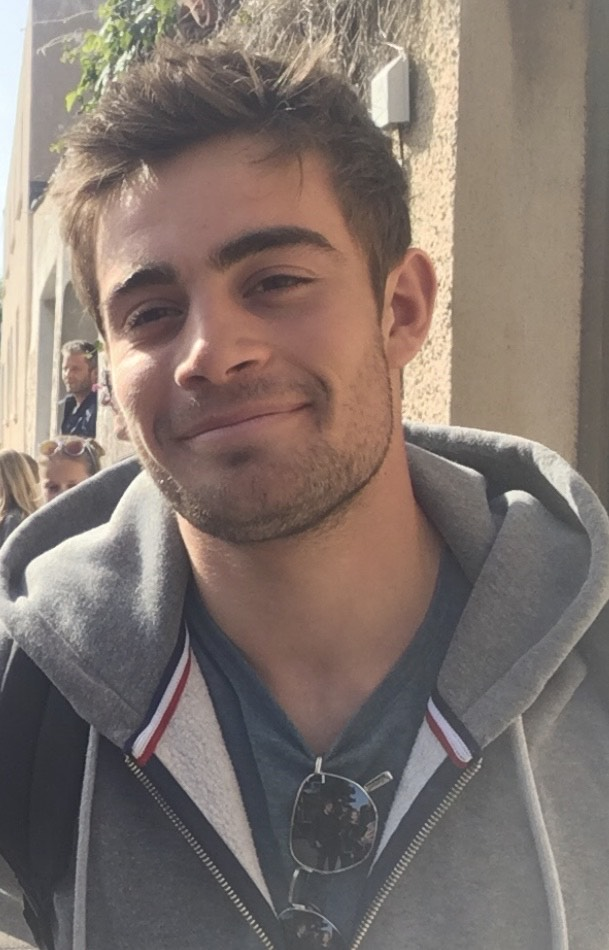
Clément Rémiens

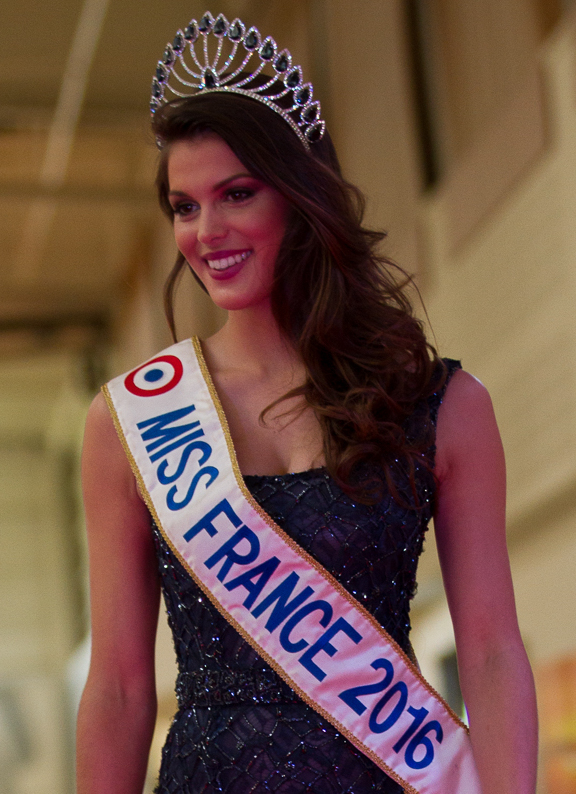
Iris Mittenaere

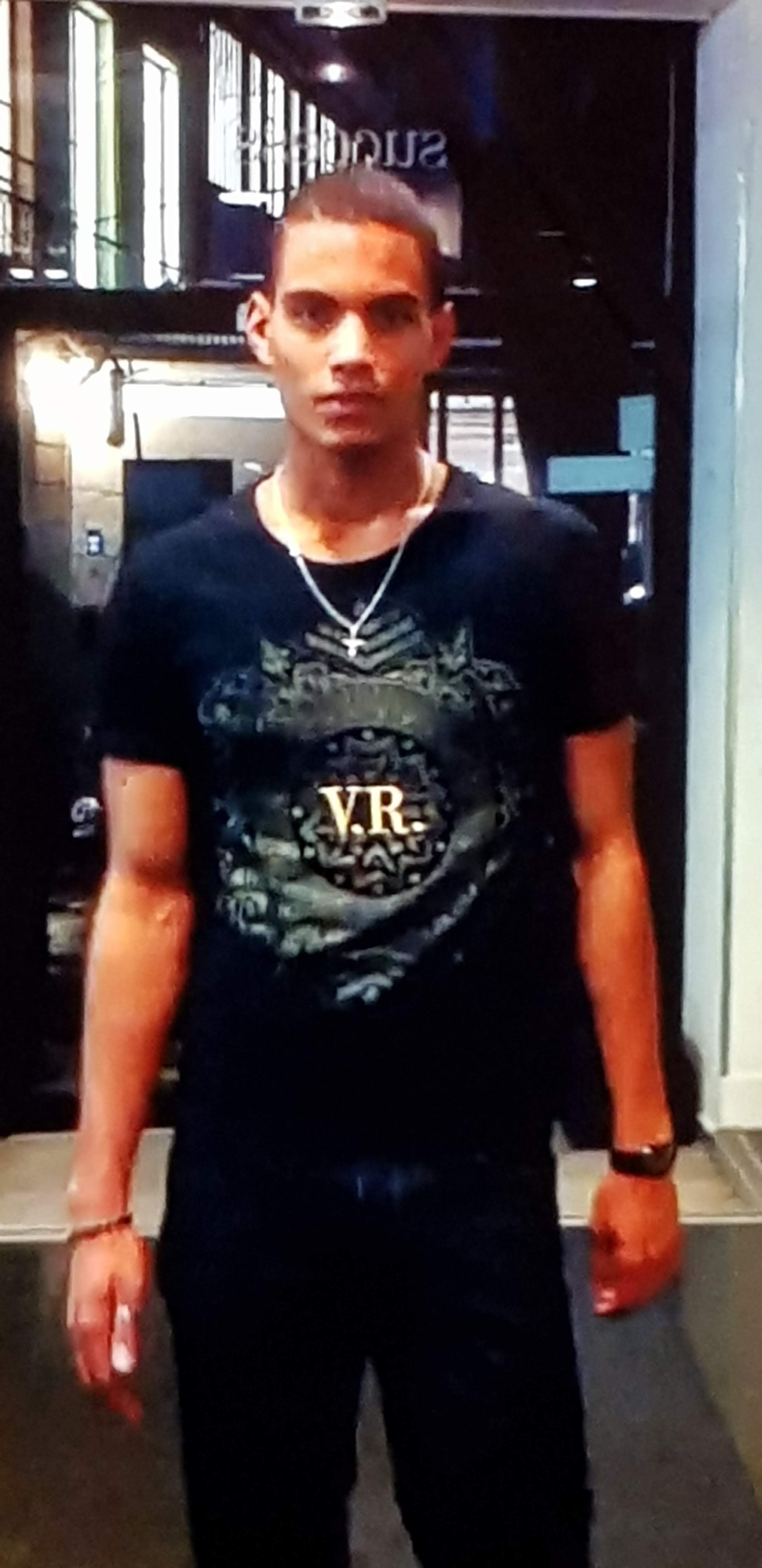
Terence Telle

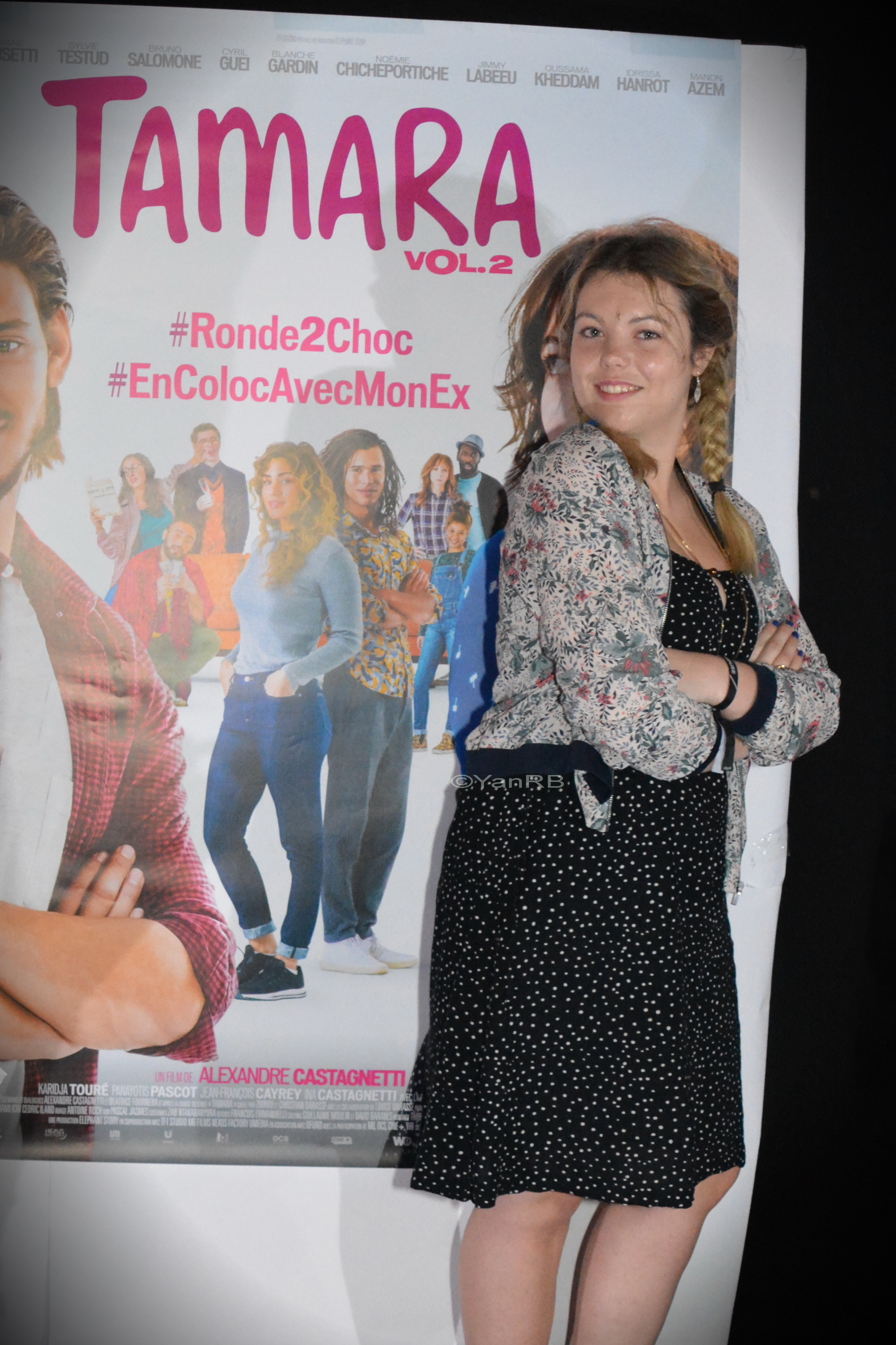
Héloïse Martin

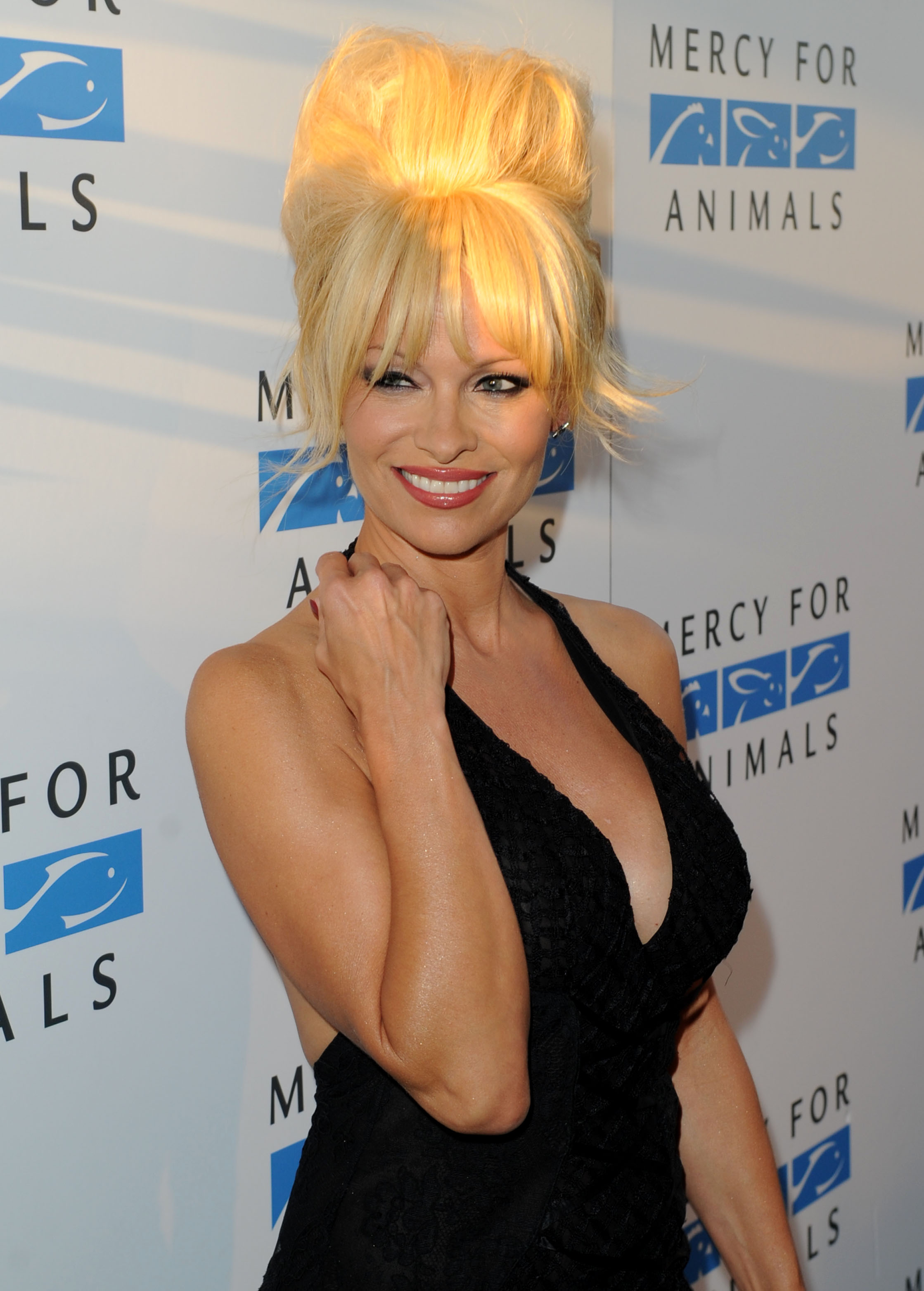
Pamela Anderson

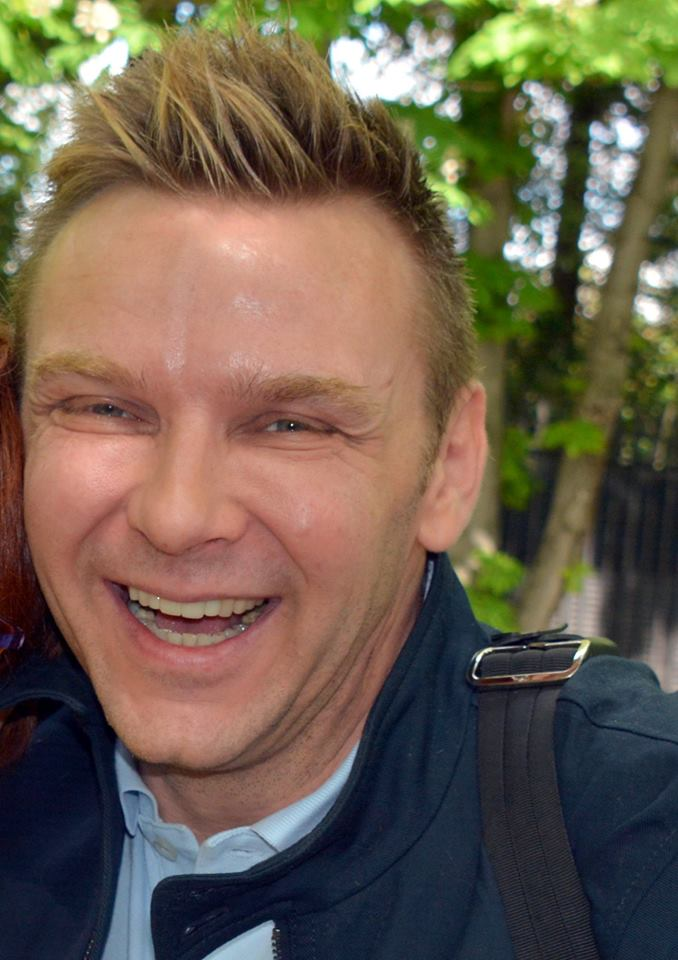
Jeanfi Janssens

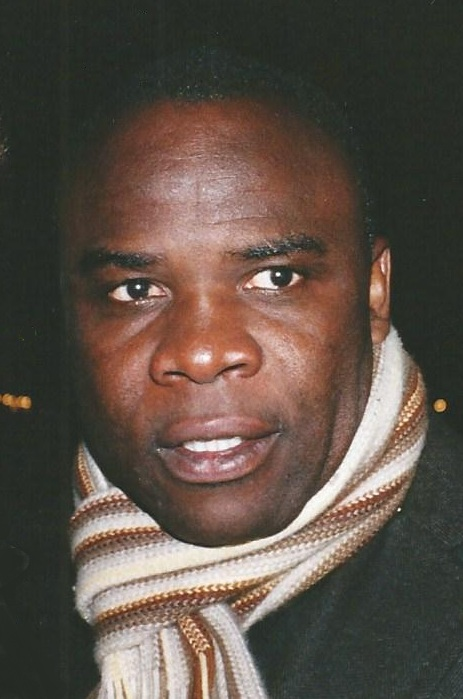
Basile Boli

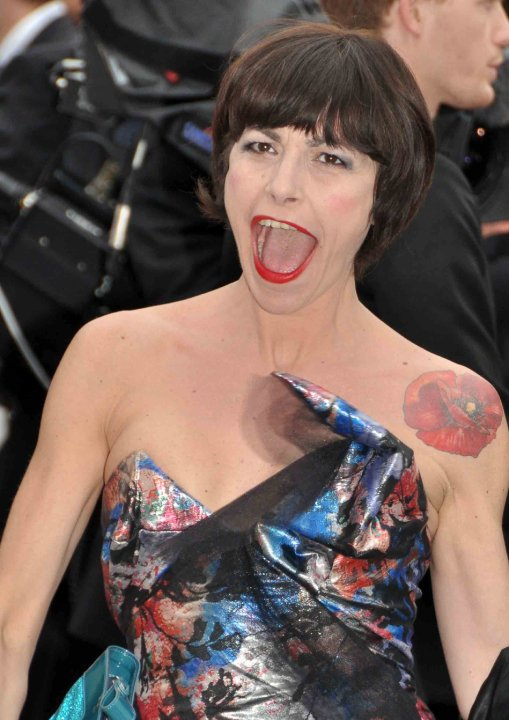
Lio

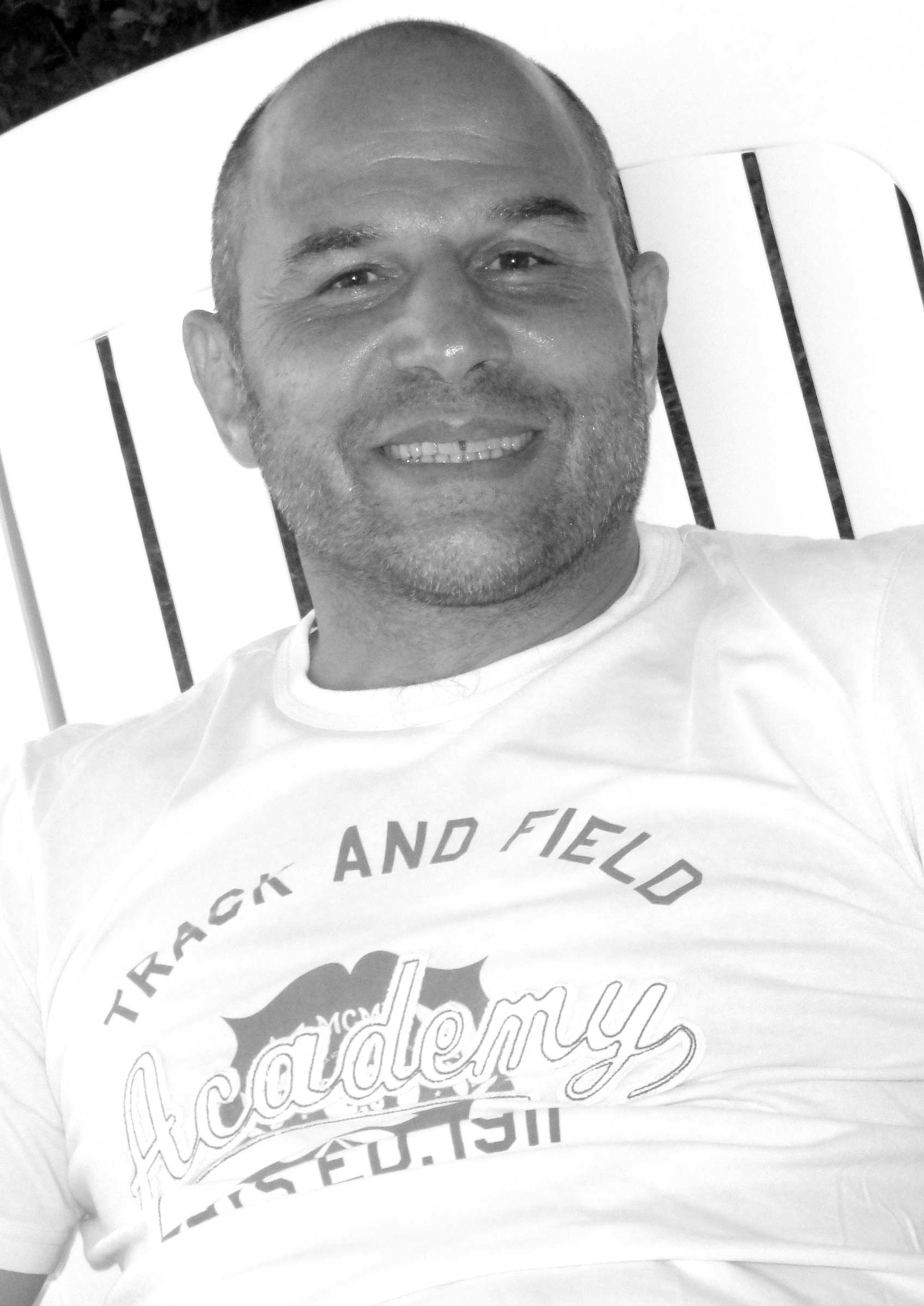
Vincent Moscato

== Scoring ==
Team	Place	1	2	1+2	3	4	5	6	7	8	9	10
Clément & Denitsa	1	26	35 + 5 = 40	66	26	30	30 + 10 = 40	34 + 10 = 44	29 + 35 = 64	28 + 35 = 63	35 + 39 + 15 + 89	No scores
Iris & Anthony	2	25	30	55	30	34	33 + 12 = 45	33 + 8 = 41	29 + 30 = 59	22 + 35 = 57	36 + 37 + 5 = 78	No scores
Terence & Fauve	3	29	27	56	31	31	32 + 6 = 38	/	35 + 34 = 69	26 + 37 = 63	32 + 35 + 10 = 77	
Héloïse & Christophe	4	30	31 + 5 = 36	66	31	27	29 + 14 = 43	32 + 4 = 36	29 + 32 = 61	25 + 29 = 54		
Pamela & Maxime	5	22	33 + 5 = 38	60	32	/	37 + 8 = 45	33 + 6 = 39	26 + 33 = 59			
Jeanfi & Marie	6	16	16	32	26	26	18 + 2 = 20	26 + 2 = 28				
Basile & Katrina	7	21	25 + 5 = 30	51	25	25	26 + 4 = 30					
Lio & Christian	8	29	33 + 5 = 38	67	32	30						
Vincent & Candice	9	20	21 + 5 = 26	46	18							
Anouar & Emmanuelle	10	25	25 + 5 = 30	55								
Carla & Jordan	11	25	28 + 5 = 33	58								

Red numbers indicate the couples with the lowest score for each week.
Blue numbers indicate the couples with the highest score for each week.
indicates the couples eliminated that week.
indicates the returning couple that finished in the bottom two.
indicates the winning couple.
indicates the runner-up couple.
indicates the third place couple.

=== Notes of each couples ===
Couple	Total	10	9	8	7	6	5	4	3	2	1	Average
Clément & Denitsa	47	5	15	14	7	6	—N/a					8.1
Iris & Anthony	47	2	15	15	10	4	1	—N/a				8.0
Terence & Fauve	43	3	12	16	11	1	—N/a					8.1
Héloïse & Christophe	39	—N/a	4	18	14	2	1	—N/a				7.6
Pamela & Maxime	28	3	5	11	3	3	2	1	—N/a			7.7
Jeanfi & Marie	24	—N/a		2	3	6	5	6	2	—N/a		5.3
Basile & Katrina	20	—N/a		2	5	8	3	2	—N/a			6.1
Lio & Christian	16	—N/a	5	4	5	2	—N/a					7.8
Vincent & Candice	12	—N/a		1	—N/a	2	5	2	2	—N/a		4.9
Anouar & Emmanuelle	8	—N/a		1	2	3	2	—N/a				6.3
Carla & Jordan	8	—N/a			5	3	—N/a					6.6
Total	292	13	56	84	65	40	19	11	4	0	0	7.4

== Averages ==
This table only counts dances scored on the traditional 40-point scale.

Rank by average	Place	Couple	Total	Number of dances	Average
1	1	Clément & Denitsa	382	12	32,51
2	3	Terence & Fauve	349	11	32.47
3	2	Iris & Anthony	374	12	31.83
4	8	Lio & Christian	124	4	31.00
5	5	Pamela & Maxime	216	7	30.86
6	4	Héloïse & Christophe	295	10	30.26
7	11	Carla & Jordan	53	2	26.50
8	10	Anouar & Emmanuelle	50	2	25.00
9	7	Basile & Katrina	122	5	24.40
10	6	Jeanfi & Marie	128	6	21.33
11	9	Vincent & Candice	59	3	19.67

== Highest and lowest scoring performances ==
The best and worst performances in each dance according to the judges' marks:

Dance	Best dancer	Best score	Worst dancer	Worst score
Argentine Tango	Pamela Anderson	37	Iris Mittenaere; Carla Ginola	25
Samba	Iris Mittenaere	34	Jeanfi Janssens	16
Contemporary	Pamela Anderson; Iris Mittenaere	33	Jeanfi Janssens; Pamela Anderson	26
Charleston	Clément Rémiens; Iris Mittenaere	35	Anouar Toubali	25
Cha-Cha-Cha	Iris Mittenaere	37	Vincent Moscato	18
Foxtrot	Lio	33	Basile Boli	25
Quickstep	Terence Telle	37	Jeanfi Janssens	16
Jive	Clément Rémiens	37.3	Basile Boli	25
Paso Doble	Terence Telle	32	Jeanfi Janssens	18
Waltz	Clément Rémiens	35	Vincent Moscato	21
Rumba	Iris Mittenaere	36	Clément Rémiens	26
Viennese Waltz	Terence Telle	35	Pamela Anderson	32
Salsa	Héloïse Martin	27	Basile Boli	25
Flamenco	Iris Mittenaere	30	Iris Mittenaere	30
Jazz Broadway	Clément Rémiens	39	Héloïse Martin	29
Tango	Héloïse Martin	33.3	Héloïse Martin	33.3

== Couples' highest and lowest scoring performances ==
According to the traditional 40-point scale: (points on a 30-point scale are recalculated on a 40-point scale)

Couples	Highest Scoring Dances	Lowest Scoring Dances
Clément & Denitsa	Jazz Broadway (39)	Foxtrot; Rumba (26)
Iris & Anthony	Cha-Cha-Cha (37)	Argentine Tango (25)
Terence & Fauve	Quickstep (37)	Paso Doble (27)
Heloïse & Christophe	Tango (33.3)	Salsa (27)
Pamela & Maxime	Argentine Tango (37)	Cha-Cha-Cha (22)
Jeanfi & Marie	Waltz; Contemporary; Charleston (26)	Quickstep; Samba (16)
Basile & Katrina	Quickstep (26)	Samba (21)
Lio & Christian	Foxtrot (33)	Cha-Cha-Cha (29)
Vincent & Candice	Waltz (21)	Cha-Cha-Cha (18)
Anouar & Emmanuelle	Charleston; Paso Doble (25)	Charleston; Paso Doble (25)
Carla & Jordan	Cha-Cha-Cha (28)	Argentine Tango (25)

== Styles, scores and songs ==
=== Week 1 ===
Individual judges' scores in the chart below (given in parentheses) are listed in this order from left to right: Patrick Dupond, Shy'm, Chris Marques, Jean-Marc Généreux.

Running order

Couple	Score	Style	Music
Iris & Anthony	25 (6,8,6,5)	Argentine Tango	Havana – Camila Cabello
Basile & Katrina	21 (7,6,4,4)	Samba	Sapés comme jamais – Maître Gims
Terence & Fauve	29 (7,7,7,8)	Contemporary	La superbe – Benjamin Biolay
Anouar & Emmanuelle	25 (8,6,5,6)	Charleston	Sing, Sing, Sing (With a Swing) – Benny Goodman
Lio & Christian	29 (8,8,6,7)	Cha-Cha-Cha	Hot n Cold – Katy Perry
Clément & Denitsa	26 (6,7,7,6)	Foxtrot	Pas là – Vianney
Pamela & Maxime	22 (7,6,4,5)	Cha-Cha-Cha	I'm Every Woman – Chaka Khan
Vincent & Candice	20 (6,5,5,4)	Quickstep	Supercalifragilisticexpialidocious – Julie Andrews & Dick Van Dyke
Carla & Jordan	25 (7,6,6,6)	Argentine Tango	Moi... Lolita – Julien Doré
Jeanfi & Marie	16 (4,4,4,4)	Quickstep	I'm Still Standing – Elton John
Héloïse & Christophe	30 (9,7,7,7)	Cha-Cha-Cha	Mamma Mia – ABBA

=== Week 2: The Judges' challenge ===
Individual judges' scores in the chart below (given in parentheses) are listed in this order from left to right: Patrick Dupond, Shy'm, Chris Marques, Jean-Marc Généreux.

Running order

Couple	Score	Style	Music	Result
Basile & Katrina	25 (7,6,6,6) + 5 = 30	Jive	Jump – Van Halen	Safe
Iris & Anthony	30 (7,8,7,8)	Jive	Cosmo – Soprano	Safe
Terence & Fauve	27 (6,7,7,7)	Paso Doble	Live and Let Die – Guns N' Roses	Bottom 3
Anouar & Emmanuelle	25 (7,7,5,6) + 5 = 30	Paso Doble	Bella ciao – Naestro Ft Maître Gims, Slimane Nebchi, Vitaa & Dadju	Eliminated
Vincent & Candice	21 (8,5,3,5) + 5 = 26	Waltz	Je suis malade – Serge Lama	Safe
Clément & Denitsa	35 (9,9,8,9) + 5 = 40	Charleston	Hit the Road Jack – Throttle	Safe
Pamela & Maxime	33 (9,8,8,8) + 5 = 38	Contemporary	Pull Marine – Isabelle Adjani	Safe
Jeanfi & Marie	16 (4,5,4,3)	Samba	Crazy in Love – Beyoncé Ft Jay-Z	Safe
Héloïse & Christophe	31 (8,8,7,8) + 5 = 36	Rumba	One Moment in Time – Whitney Houston	Safe
Carla & Jordan	28 (7,7,7,7) + 5 = 33	Cha-Cha-Cha	Mafiosa – Lartiste Ft Carolina	Eliminated
Lio & Christian	33 (9,9,7,8) + 5 = 38	Foxtrot	Sur un prélude de Bach – Maurane	Safe
Face To Face
Terence & Fauve	57%	Quickstep	It's Not Unusual – Tom Jones	Safe
Anouar & Emmanuelle	24%	Quickstep	It's Not Unusual – Tom Jones	Eliminated
Carla & Jordan	19%	Quickstep	It's Not Unusual – Tom Jones	Eliminated

=== Week 3: Love Night ===
Individual judges' scores in the chart below (given in parentheses) are listed in this order from left to right: Patrick Dupond, Shy'm, Chris Marques, Jean-Marc Généreux.

Running order

Couple	Score	Style	Music	Result
Vincent & Candice	18 (6,5,4,3)	Cha-Cha-Cha	Amoureux de ma femme – Richard Anthony	Eliminated
Iris & Anthony	30 (8,8,7,7)	Foxtrot	Maman la plus belle du monde – Luis Mariano	Safe
Héloïse & Christophe	31 (8,9,7,7)	Argentine Tango	Man! I Feel Like a Woman! – Shania Twain	Safe
Basile & Katrina	25 (8,6,5,6)	Foxtrot	I Believe I Can Fly – R. Kelly	Bottom 2
Clément & Denitsa	26 (7,7,6,6)	Rumba	I Don't Wanna Live Forever – Zayn Malik Ft Taylor Swift	Safe
Pamela & Maxime	32 (8,8,8,8)	Viennese Waltz	Can't Help Falling in Love – Elvis Presley	Safe
Terence & Fauve	31 (8,9,7,7)	Samba	Gettin' Jiggy wit It – Will Smith	Safe
Jeanfi & Marie	26 (8,6,6,6)	Waltz	Riche – Claudio Capéo	Safe
Lio & Christian	32 (9,9,7,7)	Samba	Samba do Brasil – Bellini	Safe
Face To Face
Basile & Katrina	76%	Cha-Cha-Cha	You're the First, the Last, My Everything – Barry White	Safe
Vincent & Candice	24%	Cha-Cha-Cha	You're the First, the Last, My Everything – Barry White	Eliminated

=== Week 4 ===
Individual judges' scores in the chart below (given in parentheses) are listed in this order from left to right: Patrick Dupond, Shy'm, Chris Marques, Jean-Marc Généreux.

Running order

Couple	Score	Style	Music	Result
Basile & Katrina	25 (7,7,5,6)	Salsa	Gangnam Style – Psy	Safe
Clément & Denitsa	30 (6,8,8,8)	Contemporary	Fête de trop – Eddy de Pretto	Safe
Iris & Anthony	34 (9,9,8,8)	Samba	Bootylicious – Destiny's Child	Safe
Jeanfi & Marie	26 (7,6,7,6)	Contemporary	Comme ils disent - Charles Aznavour	Safe
Héloïse & Christophe	27 (5,8,7,7)	Salsa	Spice Up Your Life – Spice Girls	Bottom 2
Pamela & Maxime	/	/	/	/
Terence & Fauve	31 (7,9,8,7)	Rumba	Everybody's Got to Learn Sometime – The Korgis	Safe
Lio & Christian	30 (8,9,6,7)	Quickstep	Le Banana Split – Lio	Eliminated
Face To Face
Héloïse & Christophe	69%	Tango	I Kissed A Girl – Katy Perry	Safe
Lio & Christian	31%	Tango	I Kissed A Girl – Katy Perry	Eliminated

=== Week 5: Halloween ===
Individual judges' scores in the chart below (given in parentheses) are listed in this order from left to right: Patrick Dupond, Shy'm, Chris Marques, Jean-Marc Généreux.

Running order

Couple	Score	Total	Style	Music	Result
Clément & Denitsa	30 (8,7,7,8)		Samba	Space Soap – Mister Cosmic vs Fat Dog	Safe
Iris & Anthony	33 (9,8,7,9)		Contemporary	Zombie – The Cranberries	Safe
Basile & Katrina	26 (7,8,5,6)		Quickstep	Bewitched theme – Howard Greenfield	Eliminated
Héloïse & Christophe	29 (7,8,6,8)		Paso Doble	Thriller – Michael Jackson	Safe
Terence & Fauve	32 (8,8,8,8)		Argentine Tango	Lullaby – The Cure	Bottom 2
Pamela & Maxime	37 (9,10,9,9)		Argentine Tango	The Addams Family Theme – Vic Mizzy	Safe
Jeanfi & Marie	18 (5,5,3,5)		Paso Doble	Superman Theme – John Williams	Safe
Dance Marathon
Héloïse & Christophe	+ 14	43	Salsa	La Salsa du démon – Le Grand Orchestre du Splendid	
Iris & Anthony	+ 12	45	Salsa	La Salsa du démon – Le Grand Orchestre du Splendid	
Clément & Denitsa	+ 10	40	Salsa	La Salsa du démon – Le Grand Orchestre du Splendid	
Pamela & Maxime	+ 8	45	Salsa	La Salsa du démon – Le Grand Orchestre du Splendid	
Terence & Fauve	+ 6	38	Salsa	La Salsa du démon – Le Grand Orchestre du Splendid	
Basile & Katrina	+ 4	30	Salsa	La Salsa du démon – Le Grand Orchestre du Splendid	
Jeanfi & Marie	+ 2	20	Salsa	La Salsa du démon – Le Grand Orchestre du Splendid	
Face To Face
Terence & Fauve	76%		Contemporary	Frozen – Madonna	Safe
Basile & Katrina	24%		Contemporary	Frozen – Madonna	Eliminated

=== Week 6: Welcome Home ===
Individual judges' scores in the chart below (given in parentheses) are listed in this order from left to right: Patrick Dupond, Shy'm, Chris Marques, Jean-Marc Généreux.

Running order

Couple	Score	Total	Style	Music	Result
Iris & Anthony	33 (9,8,7,9)		Rumba	Les gens du Nord – Enrico Macias	Safe
Clément & Denitsa	34 (9,9,8,8)		Quickstep	Another Day of Sun from La La Land	Safe
Héloïse & Christophe	32 (9,8,7,8)		Foxtrot	Famille – Génération Goldman	Bottom 2
Jeanfi & Marie	26 (8,7,5,6)		Charleston	Cotton-Eyed Joe – Rednex	Eliminated
Terence & Fauve	/		Jazz Broadway	/	/
Pamela & Maxime	33 (10,8,7,8)		Rumba	You Can Leave Your Hat On – Joe Cocker	Safe
Best Lift Challenge
Clément & Denitsa	+ 10	44	/	One Kiss – Calvin Harris & Dua Lipa	
Iris & Anthony	+ 8	41	/	One Kiss – Calvin Harris & Dua Lipa	
Pamela & Maxime	+ 6	39	/	One Kiss – Calvin Harris & Dua Lipa	
Héloïse & Christophe	+ 4	36	/	One Kiss – Calvin Harris & Dua Lipa	
Jeanfi & Marie	+ 2	28	/	One Kiss – Calvin Harris & Dua Lipa	
Face To Face
Héloïse & Christophe	75%		Samba	Djadja – Aya Nakamura	Safe
Jeanfi & Marie	25%		Samba	Djadja – Aya Nakamura	Eliminated

=== Week 7: Michael Jackson Night ===
Individual judges' scores in the chart below (given in parentheses) are listed in this order from left to right: Patrick Dupond, Shy'm, Chris Marques, Jean-Marc Généreux.

Running order

Couple	Score	Total	Style	Music	Result
Iris & Anthony	29 (8,7,6,8)	59	Cha-Cha-Cha	The Way You Make Me Feel – Michael Jackson	Safe
Iris & Anthony	30 (9,7,7,7)	59	Flamenco (with Jordan Mouillerac)	Bella – Kendji Girac	Safe
Pamela & Maxime	26 (9,6,5,6)	59	Contemporary	Earth Song – Michael Jackson	Eliminated
Pamela & Maxime	33 (10,8,7,8)	59	Quickstep (with Katrina Patchett)	Moi je joue – Brigitte Bardot	Eliminated
Clément & Denitsa	29 (8,8,7,6)	64	Cha-Cha-Cha	Beat It – Michael Jackson	Safe
Clément & Denitsa	35 (9,9,8,9)	64	Argentine Tango (with Emmanuelle Berne)	Tout doucement – Bibie	Safe
Terence & Fauve	35 (10,9,8,8)	69	Cha-Cha-Cha	P.Y.T. (Pretty Young Thing) – Michael Jackson	Bottom 2
Terence & Fauve	34 (9,9,7,9)	69	Jazz Broadway (with Candice Pascal)	Smile – Charlie Chaplin	Bottom 2
Héloïse & Christophe	29 (7,8,7,7)	61	Samba	I Want You Back – The Jackson 5	Safe
Héloïse & Christophe	32 (8,8,8,8)	61	Jive (with Christian Millette)	Proud Mary – Ike & Tina Turner	Safe
Face To Face
Terence & Fauve	73%		Paso Doble	Bad – Michael Jackson	Safe
Pamela & Maxime	27%		Paso Doble	Bad – Michael Jackson	Eliminated

=== Week 8: Coach's Night ===
Individual judges' scores in the chart below (given in parentheses) are listed in this order from left to right: Patrick Dupond, Shy'm, Chris Marques, Jean-Marc Généreux.

Running order

Couple	Score	Total	Style	Music	Result
Iris & Anthony	22 (8,6,8)	57	Contemporary (with Patrick Dupond)	Ton héritage – Benjamin Biolay	Safe
Iris & Anthony	35 (9,9,8,9)	57	Charleston	Jolie Coquine – Caravan Palace	Safe
Clément & Denitsa	28 (10,9,9)	63	Jive (with Jean-Marc Généreux)	Saved by the Bell theme	Safe
Clément & Denitsa	35 (10,8,8,9)	63	Waltz	Next to Me – Imagine Dragons	Safe
Terence & Fauve	26 (10,8,8)	63	Rumba (with Shy'm)	Ma benz – Brigitte	Bottom 2
Terence & Fauve	37 (9,10,9,9)	63	Quickstep	You Can't Hurry Love – Phil Collins	Bottom 2
Héloïse & Christophe	25 (8,9,8)	54	Tango (with Chris Marques)	Ta marinière – Hoshi	Eliminated
Héloïse & Christophe	29 (7,8,6,8)	54	Jazz Broadway	Don't Rain on My Parade – Barbra Streisand	Eliminated
Face To Face
Terence & Fauve	59%		Samba	Come – Jain	Safe
Héloïse & Christophe	41%		Samba	Come – Jain	Eliminated

=== Week 9: Michel Sardou Night ===
Individual judges' scores in the chart below (given in parentheses) are listed in this order from left to right: Patrick Dupond, Shy'm, Jean-Marc Généreux, Chris Marques.

Running Order
Couple	Score	Total	Style	Music	Result
Clément et Denitsa	35 (9,9,9,8)	74	Waltz	Je vole – Michel Sardou	Safe
Clément et Denitsa	39 (10,10,10,9)	74	Jazz Broadway	La Java de Broadway – Michel Sardou	Safe
Terence et Fauve	32 (8,8,8,8)	67	Contemporary, Paso Doble, Rumba & Waltz	Les Lacs du Connemara – Michel Sardou	Eliminated
Terence et Fauve	35 (9,9,9,8)	67	Viennese Waltz	La Maladie d'amour – Michel Sardou	Eliminated
Iris et Anthony	36 (9,9,9,9)	73	Rumba	Je vais t'aimer – Michel Sardou	Bottom 2
Iris et Anthony	37 (10,9,10,8)	73	Cha-Cha-Cha	Être une femme – Michel Sardou	Bottom 2
Megamix
Clément & Denitsa	+ 15	89	Waltz + Tango + Rumba	Je Viens du Sud – Michel Sardou + Chanteur de Jazz – Michel Sardou + Une Fille aux Yeux Clairs – Michel Sardou	
Terence & Fauve	+ 10	77	Waltz + Tango + Rumba	Je Viens du Sud – Michel Sardou + Chanteur de Jazz – Michel Sardou + Une Fille aux Yeux Clairs – Michel Sardou	
Iris & Anthony	+ 5	78	Waltz + Tango + Rumba	Je Viens du Sud – Michel Sardou + Chanteur de Jazz – Michel Sardou + Une Fille aux Yeux Clairs – Michel Sardou	
Face To Face
Iris & Anthony	57%		Foxtrot	En Chantant – Michel Sardou	Safe
Terence & Fauve	43%		Foxtrot	En Chantant – Michel Sardou	Eliminated

=== Week 10: Final Night ===
Individual judges' scores in the chart below (given in parentheses) are listed in this order from left to right: Patrick Dupond, Shy'm, Jean-Marc Généreux, Chris Marques.

Running Order
Couple	Heart Stroke	Style	Music
Iris & Anthony	Shy'M; Jean-Marc Généreux	Paso Doble	Palladio – Escala
Iris & Anthony	Patrick Dupond	Samba	Bootylicious – Destiny's Child
Clément & Denitsa	Patrick Dupond; Chris Marques	Contemporary	Basique – Orelsan
Clément & Denitsa	Shy'M; Chris Marques; Jean-Marc Généreux	Charleston	Hit the Road Jack – Throttle
Last Dance
Iris & Anthony	40%	Rumba	La Déclaration D'Amour – France Gall
Clément & Denitsa	60%	Contemporary	In My Blood – Shawn Mendes

== Dance chart ==
Couple	1	2	3	4	5		6	7		8		9			10		
Clément & Denitsa	Foxtrot	Charleston	Rumba	Contemporary	Samba	Salsa Marathon	Quickstep	Cha-Cha-Cha	Argentine Tango (with Emmanuelle)	Jive (with Jean-Marc)	Waltz	Waltz	Jazz Broadway	Waltz / Tango / Rumba (Megamix)	Contemporary	Charleston	Contemporary
Iris & Anthony	Argentine Tango	Jive	Foxtrot	Samba	Contemporary	Salsa Marathon	Rumba	Cha-Cha-Cha	Flamenco (with Jordan)	Contemporary (with Patrick)	Charleston	Rumba	Cha-Cha-Cha	Waltz / Tango / Rumba (Megamix)	Paso Doble	Samba	Rumba
Terence & Fauve	Contemporary	Paso Doble	Samba	Rumba	Argentine Tango	Salsa Marathon		Cha-Cha-Cha	Jazz Broadway (with Candice)	Rumba (with Shy'm)	Quickstep	Contemporary / Paso Doble / Rumba / Waltz	Viennese Waltz	Waltz / Tango / Rumba (Megamix)			
Héloïse & Christophe	Cha-Cha-Cha	Rumba	Argentine Tango	Salsa	Paso Doble	Salsa Marathon	Foxtrot	Samba	Jive (with Christian)	Tango (with Chris)	Jazz Broadway						
Pamela & Maxime	Cha-Cha-Cha	Contemporary	Viennese Waltz		Argentine Tango	Salsa Marathon	Rumba	Contemporary	Quickstep (with Katrina)								
Jeanfi & Marie	Quickstep	Samba	Waltz	Contemporary	Paso Doble	Salsa Marathon	Charleston										
Basile & Katrina	Samba	Jive	Foxtrot	Salsa	Quickstep	Salsa Marathon											
Lio & Christian	Cha-Cha-Cha	Foxtrot	Samba	Quickstep													
Vincent & Candice	Quickstep	Waltz	Cha-Cha-Cha														
Anouar & Emmanuelle	Charleston	Paso Doble															
Carla & Jordan	Argentine Tango	Cha-Cha-Cha															

Highest scoring dance
Lowest scoring dance
Danced, but not scored

== Musical Guests ==
Date	Performers	Tracks Performed
October 27, 2018	Vincent Niclo	"El Fuego Del Amor"
November 3, 2018	Jenifer	"Notre Idylle"
November 17, 2018	Zazie	"Speed"
November 24, 2018	Michel Sardou	
