= Sagan (film) =

- Theatrical poster
- Directed by: Diane Kurys
- Written by: Diane Kurys; Claire Lemaréchal; Martine Moriconi
- Produced by: Catherine Grandjean; Diane Kurys; Cindy Tempez
- Starring: Sylvie Testud; Pierre Palmade; Lionel Abelanski; Jeanne Balibar; Arielle Dombasle
- Cinematography: Michel Abramowicz
- Edited by: Sylvie Gadmer
- Music by: Armand Amar
- Production companies: Alexandre Films; France 2
- Distributed by: EuropaCorp Distribution
- Release date: 11 June 2008
- Running time: 117 minutes/180 minutes (2 part version)
- Country: France
- Language: French
- Budget: $2.1 million
- Box office: $5.3 million

Sagan is a 2008 French biographical film, directed by Diane Kurys, starring Sylvie Testud as French author Françoise Sagan and Pierre Palmade as a dancer and a society man, Jacques Chazot, who was very well known in France. The film starts in the mid-1950s as Sagan (then still known under her real name Quoirez) closes a publishing deal for her controversial debut novel Bonjour Tristesse.

The film then follows Sagan's road to fame, her drug abuse, alcoholism, and gambling, her hedonistic lifestyle spending too much and becoming poor, as well as several complex love affairs with both men and women.

== Cast ==
- Sylvie Testud - Françoise Sagan
- Pierre Palmade - Jacques Chazot
- Jeanne Balibar - Peggy Roche
- Arielle Dombasle - Astrid
- Lionel Abelanski - Bernard Frank
- Guillaume Gallienne - Jacques Quoirez
- Denis Podalydès - Guy Schoeller
- Bruno Wolkowitch - Philippe
- Samuel Labarthe - René Julliard
- Chantal Neuwirth - Madame Lebreton
- Alexis Michalik - Denis Westhoff

== Awards and nominations ==
- César Awards (France)
  - Nominated: Best Actress – Leading Role (Sylvie Testud)
  - Nominated: Best Actress – Supporting Role (Jeanne Balibar)
  - Nominated: Best Costume Design (Nathalie du Roscoat)
