= Dominique Mainard =

French translator and writer

Dominique Mainard is a French translator of English novels, short story writer and novelist. She was born in Paris, France, in 1967 and grew up in the region of Lyon, and spent five years in the United States. She won the 2009 Prix des Libraires (Booksellers Prize) for her novel Pour vous (For You). Mainard spent 2005 - 2006 as a resident of the Randell Cottage Writers' Trust in Wellington, New Zealand. Her book Leur histoire was adapted for the 2005 film Les Mots bleus by director Alain Corneau with actors Sergi López and Sylvie Testud.

== Biography ==
Dominique Mainard grew up in the Lyon area and spent five years in the United States.

She has published novels and short stories, and has also translated works by authors such as Janet Frame and John Cheever from English.

In 2008, she published her first young adult novel, Ma vie en 17 pieds.According to Martine Laval of Télérama: “We find Mainard’s signature style here: finesse and delicacy, a sharp-eyed view of the world of childhood and adolescence, so present in her writing. Even for children, Mainard writes in her own style: abandonment, loneliness, emptiness, and that tenacious desire to fight on despite everything.”

== Works ==
Translations

English novels, including authors John Cheever and Janet Frame

Collections of short stories

- Le Grenadier (1997), Gallimard
- La Maison des fatigués Editions Joëlle Losfeld
- Le Second Enfant. Prix Prométhée de la nouvelle (Prometheus Prize for Novels)

Novels

- Le Grand Fakir (2001), EditionsJoelle Losfeld
- Leur histoire (2002), Joëlle Losfeld editions. Fnac Novel Prize and Alain-Fournier Prize.
- Le Ciel des chevaux (2004), Editions Joelle Losfeld
- Je voudrais tant que tu te souviennes (2007), Joëlle Losfeld editions. France Culture Book Award - Télérama 2007. There is an Italian translation by Edizioni Saecula
- Pour vous (2008), Joëlle Losfeld editions. Booksellers Award 2009.

Novella

- La Vie en rose (2007), Éditions du Chemin de fer

Youth

- Ma vie en 17 pieds (2008), L'École des loisirs
