= Adrienne Pauly =

French actress and singer

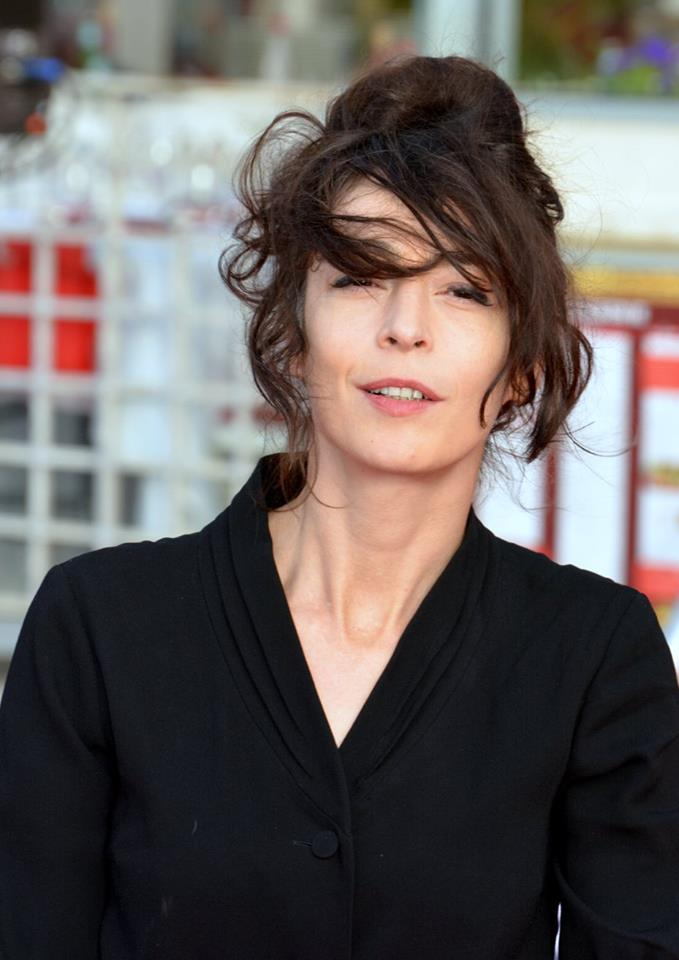
- Adrienne Pauly in 2018
- Born: 30 May 1977 (age 49); Clamart, France
- Occupations: Actress, singer
- Years active: 1997-present

Adrienne Pauly (born 30 May 1977) is a French actress and pop-rock singer.

She joined the Conservatoire National Superieur d'Art Dramatique in 1996, where she studied drama, and acted in films until 2002, when she discovered the piano through Camille Bazbaz. Later, she recorded a demo and, in 2004, made her first concert at the House of Live in Paris, and then to Dejazey in Rennes and thereafter at the Lavoir Moderne and at the Olympic Café. She released her first album on 16 October 2006.

== Filmography ==
=== Film ===
- 1997: Mauvais genre by Laurent Bénégui
- 1997: Il y a des journées qui mériteraient qu'on leur casse la gueule by Alan Beigel
- 1998: Terminale by Francis Girod
- 1999: Au cœur du mensonge by Claude Chabrol
- 2002: La Bête de miséricorde by Jean-Pierre Mocky
- 2009: Bellamy by Claude Chabrol

=== Television ===
- 2001: Le Prix de la vérité de Joël Santoni
- 2011: Mystère au Moulin-Rouge in the role of Lila

== Discography ==
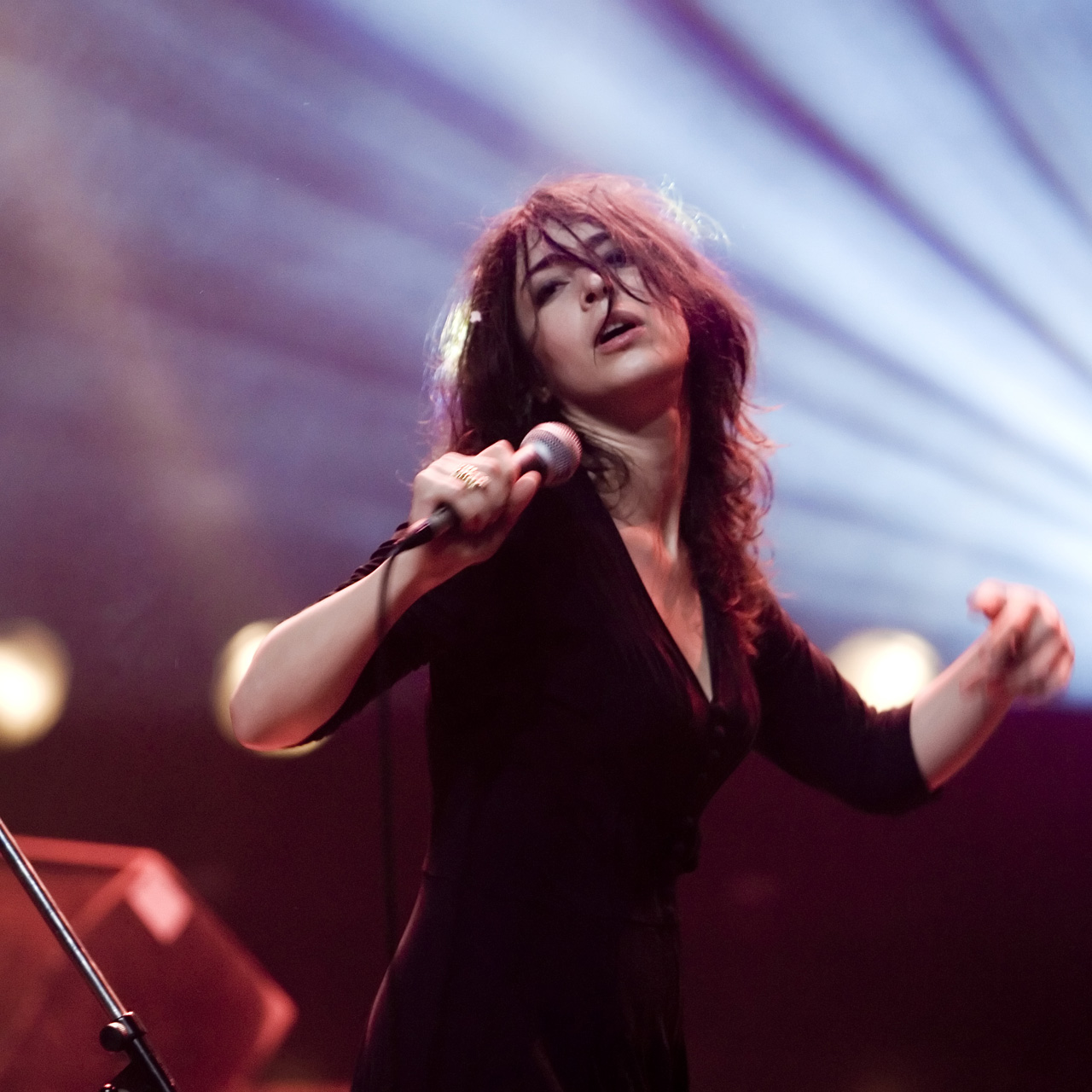
Pauly performing in 2007

=== Albums ===
- 2006: Adrienne Pauly (first album)
- 2018: A vos amours
- 2024: Et comment tu trouves Que j'me trouve?!

=== Singles ===
- 2006: "J'veux un mec"
- 2006: "Nazebroke" ("La fille au Prisunic")

== Nominations ==
- 2007: Victoires de la Musique: "Artist Discovery of the Year"
- 2007: Victoires de la Musique: "Album Discovery of the Year"
