= Rayane Bensetti =

French actor

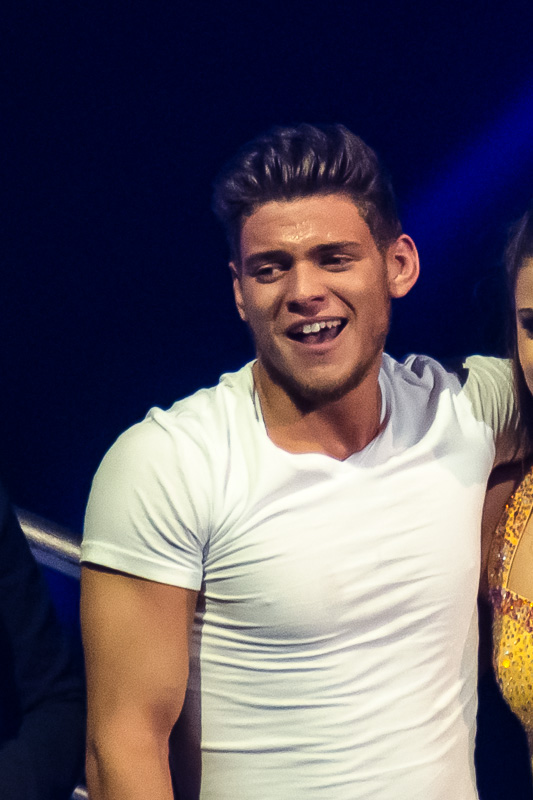
- Born: 9 April 1993 (age 33); Lyon, France
- Occupation: Actor
- Years active: 2006-present
- Known for: Season 5 of Danse avec les stars
- Television: Pep's
- Parent: Bachir Bensetti

Rayane Bensetti (French pronunciation: [ʁajan bɛnseti]; born 9 April 1993 in Lyon) is a French actor. He is well known for being the winner of the fifth season of Danse avec les stars with the dancer Denitsa Ikonomova.

== Early life ==
As a child, he starred in commercials, for example Carrefour, Nocibé and Toys "R" Us.

He started on TV in 2008 by being an extra on Il faut sauver Saïd.

== Career ==
His first role was on TV in 2008 with Mystère à la colo. He later on had a few roles, as TV movie Petits arrangements avec ma mère and movie Arrête de pleurer Pénélope in 2011.

His breakout role is Benjamin Vidal on TV series Pep's which he embodies since 2013.

In 2014, he was part of the fifth season of Danse avec les stars, which he won with dancer mentor Denitsa Ikonomova. They later on toured for it. The same year he had roles on TV, as Joséphine, ange gardien and Accusé, and was photographed by Karl Lagerfeld for fashion magazine Numéro. He and Philippe Lellouche joined the TV series Clem as two new main characters for the fifth season which was broadcast in March 2015.

In February 2015 he gave an interview in which he announced that he will be in the next Luc Besson movie.

== Filmography ==
Year	Title	Role	Director	Notes
2008	Il faut sauver Saïd		Didier Grousset	TV movie
2008-09	Mystère à la colo	Ethan	Éric Communier	TV series (26 episodes)
2009	Un mariage en Algérie	Rémi	Nadja Harek	TV movie
2009	C'est mon tour		Patrice Martineau	TV movie
2012	Arrête de pleurer Pénélope	Young Nicolas	Juliette Arnaud & Corinne Puget	
2012	Petits arrangements avec ma mère	Roby	Denis Malleval	TV movie
2012	Délit de fuite		Thierry Binisti	TV movie
2013	L'escalier de fer		Denis Malleval (2)	TV movie
2013-15	Pep's	Benjamin Vidal	Jonathan Barré, Stéphane Kopecky, ...	TV series
2014	Pas d'inquiétude	Sofiane	Thierry Binisti (2)	TV movie
2014	Josephine, Guardian Angel	Tony	Philippe Proteau	TV series (1 episode)
2015	Accusé	Eliot	Julien Despaux	TV series (1 episode)
2015-17	Clem	Dimitri Ferran	Joyce Buñuel, Arnauld Mercadier, ...	TV series (12 episodes)
2016	Tamara	Diego	Alexandre Castagnetti	
2016	Coup de Foudre à Jaipur	Ravi Masseur	Arnauld Mercadier (2)	TV movie
2017	The Lego Batman Movie	Robin	Chris McKay	French Voice
2017	The Lego Ninjago Movie	Lloyd	Charlie Bean	French Voice
2017	Nos chers voisins	François Derek	Nath Dumont	TV series (1 episode)
2018	La Finale	JB Soualem	Robin Sykes	
2018	Tamara Vol. 2	Diego	Alexandre Castagnetti	
2019	Let's Dance	Joseph	Ladislas Chollat	Netflix movie
2019	Call My Agent!	Himself		Series 4 episode 5: "Sigourney"
2021	FRÈRE! S02E04	Himself	Kaza Hachemi	YouTube Guest
2021	Super-héros malgré lui	Ludovic	Philippe Lacheau	

== Theater ==
Year	Title
2006	Chez le coiffeur
2007	Inconnu
2013	Loving Out

== Music videos ==
Year	Song	Artist
2014	Maux d'enfants	Patrick Bruel Ft La Fouine
2015	J'ai piscine	Keen'V
