= Frédéric Lopez =

French television host

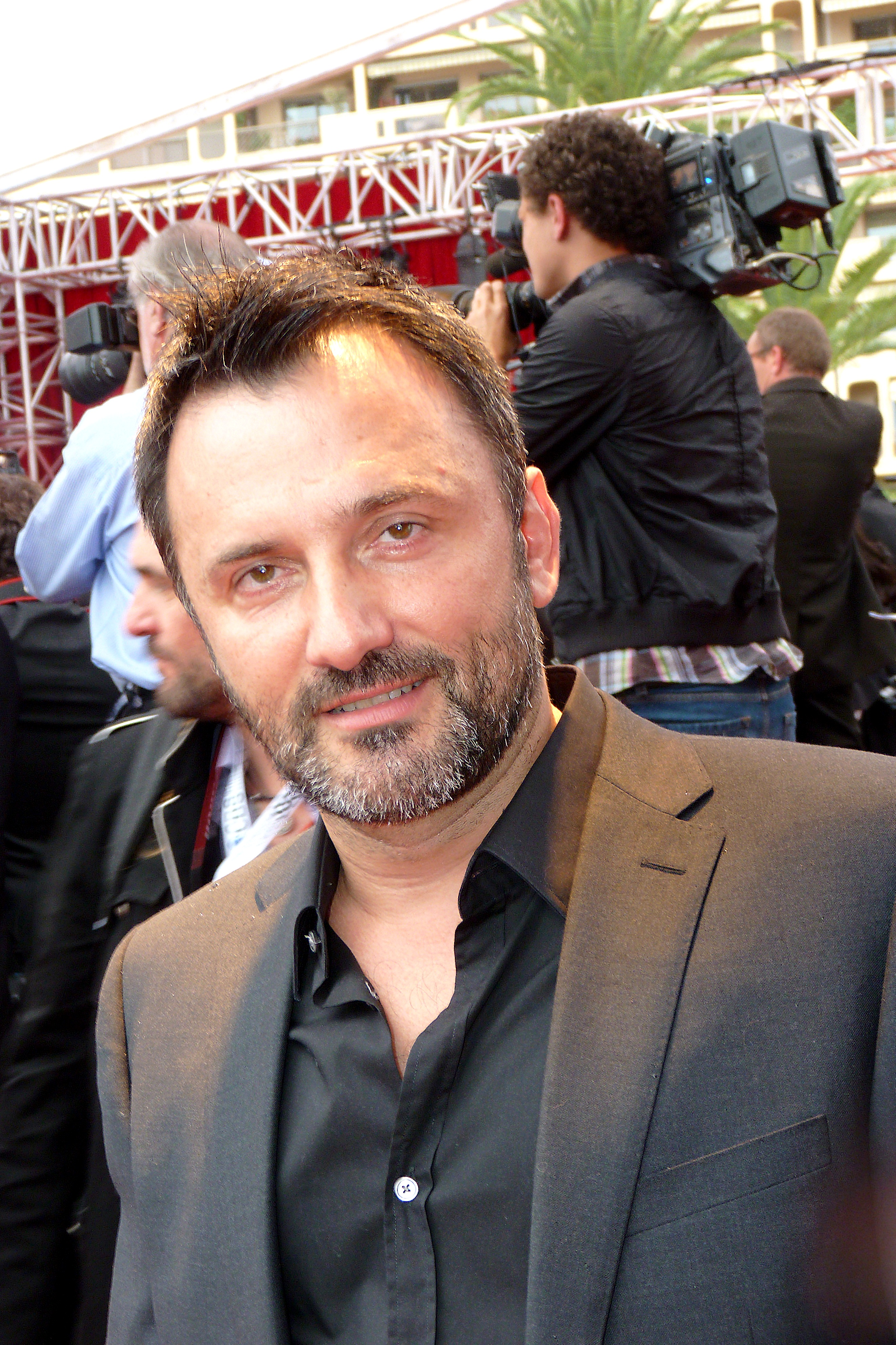
- Lopez (2012)
- Born: 4 April 1967 (age 58); Pau, France
- Occupation: Television presenter

Frédéric Lopez (born 4 April 1967 in Pau) is a French television host. He currently works for France 2 on which he presents some shows.

== Biography ==
He began on radio in 1991 on Autoroute Info, the first traffic information radio. In 1992, he worked for Télé Lyon Métropole (TLM), the channel on which he debuted on television. There he hosted talk shows and documentaries. From 1995 to 1996, he hosted Le Mag de l'Information on LM1, with Guillaume Durand.

Then he worked on LCI, where he was special envoy and correspondent. On the same channel, he led the magazine Cinéma.

In 1999, he made several appearances in Olivier Schatzky's film Mr Naphatali, with Élie Kakou.

In 2000, he presented Alors heureux ? and Fallait y penser on France 2. Then in 2004, in addition to France 2 and his program Comme au cinéma, he joined Match TV where he led a news magazine. In 2005, he created the program Rendez-vous en terre inconnue.

From September 2008, he has hosted on France 2 Panique dans l'oreillette.

In 2017, Lopez publicly came out as gay.

In 2022, a French book demonstrated that Frédéric Lopez had lied on public television France2 in a documentary about a murder (Mille et une vies, Rachel Jouvet, November 24, 2016). Frédéric Lopez claimed that the murderer of Rachel Jouvet's father's first name was Mathieu, when his real name was Abdourahmani. Frédéric Lopez made people believe that the murderer was a French Christian, when in fact he was a Muslim foreigner furious that his wife was eating pork. In his book, Jean-Pierre Steinhofer uses the trial transcript to demonstrate the lie.
