= Jacob Berger =

Swiss film director and screenwriter (born 1960)

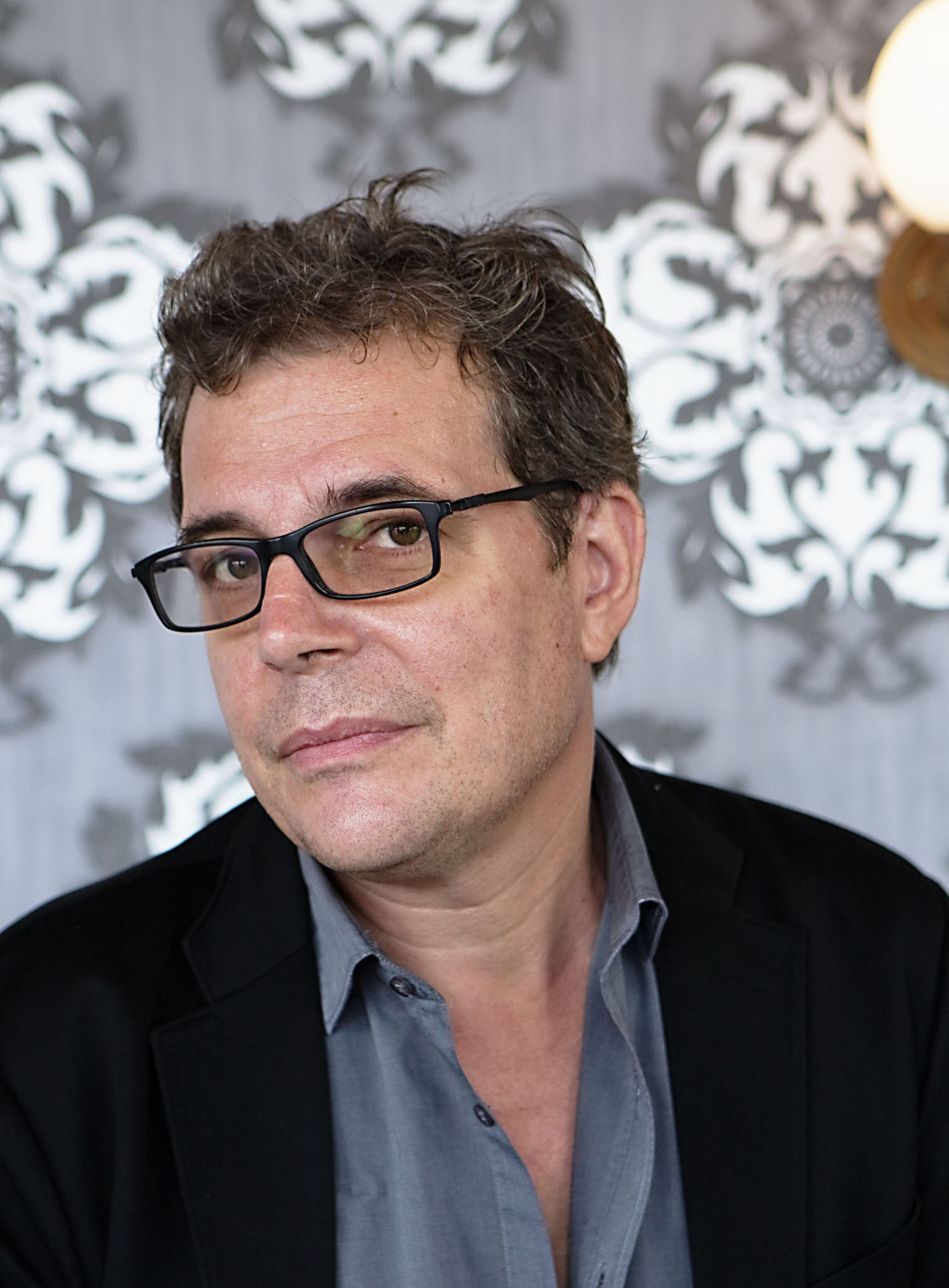
- Berger in 2006
- Born: 1965 (age 60–61); Lydney, Gloucestershire, England
- Education: New York University
- Occupations: Film director; screenwriter; actor
- Years active: 1990–present
- Father: John Berger

Jacob Berger (born 1960) is an English-born Swiss film director, screenwriter, and actor. His 1991 film Angels was entered into the 40th Berlin International Film Festival; his second motion picture A Loving Father (2002), reunited Gérard Depardieu and his son Guillaume Depardieu; That Day won Best Director at the 2007 Montreal World Film Festival and his 2017 motion picture A Jew Must Die earned Bruno Ganz a Swiss Film Award for best actor.

== Biography ==
Jacob Berger was born in Lydney, England, in 1963. He is the son of the English painter and author John Berger and the translator Anya Bostock. His paternal grandfather was of Jewish Italian ancestry, and his mother was of Russian and Austrian Jewish descent.

After studying at the Tisch School of the Arts at New York University and a first short film titled A Name for Her Desire, Jacob Berger filmed his first full-length motion picture, Angels, in Barcelona, with Steven Weber, Belinda Becker, Féodor Atkine and Angela Molina. The film was presented for official competition at the Berlin International Film Festival in 1990.

In 1991 he directed a TV movie, Jour Blanc, in the Swiss Alps with Heinz Benent, Jean-Yves Berteloot et Fabienne Périneau. The film won the Prix de la Fiction at the Antibes Film Festival.

Between 1992 and 1995, he directed a number of documentaries for Radio Télévision Suisse, including La Revanche d'Allah, La Complainte du Moscovite, La Croisade d'un conseiller fédéral, Brigade des Moeurs, Les Renards de Kaboul, La Croatie ou la mort, and several other award-winning programs.

Between 1995 and 2000, he directed a dozen TV features for Swiss and French TV, among which Un Enfant de trop (1995), Rachel et ses amours (1996), Le Roi en son moulin (1997) and Un Cadeau, la Vie (1998). He also directed various episodes of series such as Nestor Burma, Julie Lescaut and Joséphine Ange Gardien.

In 2001–2002, he wrote and directed his second motion picture film, A Loving Father, with Gérard Depardieu, Guillaume Depardieu and Sylvie Testud, presented for official competition and the Locarno International Film Festival in 2002.

Between 2004 and 2006, Jacob Berger directed a TV documentary series about Franco Dragone, of Cirque du Soleil fame, and his new show O, which premiered in 2006 in Las Vegas.

In 2007, he wrote and directed the motion picture That Day (1 Journée), featuring Natacha Régnier, Bruno Todeschini and Noémie Kocher. The film premiered at the Locarno International Film Festival and won Best Director at the Montreal World Film Festival.

Between 2009 and 2012, Berger created and took part in a 3 minute visual op-ed on the evening news program of Radio Télévision Suisse on Friday nights, called Le Regard du cinéaste. In 2010, he co-wrote Operation Libertad with Nicolas Wadimoff, which was shown at Canne's Director's Fortnight. In 2012, he directed his first major theatre show, Aminata, at Théâtre de Vidy.

In 2017, his fourth motion picture A Jew Must Die (Un Juif pour l'exemple) earned actor Bruno Ganz a Swiss National Film Award for his performance as Arthur Bloch, a Swiss Jewish cattle dealer, murdered by Swiss Nazis in 1942 in the small town of Payerne.

In 2019, he co-wrote and directed TV feature Dévoilées, which was broadcast by Radio Télévision Suisse and Arte. In 2019–2020, he cowrote and directed a TV series for Radio Télévision Suisse, Cellule de crise, with André Dussollier.

== Selected filmography ==
- The Ghost Valley (1987)
- Angels (1990)
- A Loving Father (2002)
- That Day (2007)
- A Jew Must Die (2016)
- Dévoilées (2019)
