= Rendez-vous en terre inconnue =

French television programme

- Genre: Documentary
- Presented by: Frédéric Lopez (2004–2018), Raphaël de Casabianca (2019–present)
- Theme music composer: The Sunshine
- Opening theme: "Beat It"
- Composer: Nicolas Errèra
- Country of origin: France
- Original language: French
- No. of episodes: 18

Production
- Production location: various
- Running time: 120 minutes

Original release
- Network: France 5 (2004-06); France 2 (2006- )
- Release: December 26, 2004 – present

Rendez-vous en terre inconnue (formerly En terre inconnue) is a French television program broadcast first on France 5 and then on the France 2 network. It was hosted by Frédéric Lopez (who is also the originator of the concept) for years and is now hosted by Raphaël de Casabianca, and involves taking a French celebrity to an unknown destination to live with an ethnic minority for two weeks.

The show aims to provide the viewer with a new outlook on a foreign group, whose culture and traditions are being threatened by the modern world.

== Series ==
#	Presenter	Celebrity	People	Area	Country	France broadcast			
#	Presenter	Celebrity	People	Area	Country	Airdate	Network	Audience	Share
1	Frédéric Lopez	Thierry Lhermitte (actor)		Masoala National Park	Madagascar	26 December 2004	France 5		
2	Frédéric Lopez	Pierre Palmade (humorist and actor)	Touaregs Ibankalan	Abalak	Niger	6 February 2005	France 5		
3	Frédéric Lopez	Emmanuelle Béart (actress)		Socotra	Yemen	22 May 2005	France 5		
4	Frédéric Lopez	Muriel Robin (humorist and actress)	Bagyeli (Pygmy)	Campo Ma'an National Park	Cameroon	9 October 2005	France 5		
5	Frédéric Lopez	Muriel Robin (humorist and actress)	Himbas	Kaokoland	Namibia	31 August 2006	France 2	4.8 million	20.6%
6	Frédéric Lopez	Patrick Timsit (humorist and actor)	Mentawai	Siberut	Indonesia	28 December 2006	France 2	4.9 million	19.9%
7	Frédéric Lopez	Charlotte de Turckheim (actress and film director)	Nenets	Siberia	Russia	12 July 2007	France 2	4.6 million	21.1%
8	Frédéric Lopez	Bruno Solo (actor)	Mongols	Altai	Mongolia	27 December 2007	France 2	5.1 million	21.6%
9	Frédéric Lopez	Adriana Karembeu (former top model and TV personality)	Amharas	Ethiopian Highlands, Amhara Region	Ethiopia	7 July 2008	France 2	4.9 million	20.8%
10	Frédéric Lopez	Édouard Baer (actor)	Dogon	Bandiagara Escarpment	Mali	5 January 2009	France 2	5.9 million	21.0%
11	Frédéric Lopez	Zazie (singer)	Korowaï	Papua	Indonesia	30 June 2009	France 2	5.1 million	22.4%
12	Frédéric Lopez	Gilbert Montagné (singer)	Zanskarpas	Zanskar	India	1 September 2009	France 2	4.8 million	18.9%
13	Frédéric Lopez	Marianne James (singer and former Nouvelle Star judge)	Sama-Bajau	Banggai Islands	Indonesia	6 avr 2010	France 2	5.1 million	19.2%
14	Frédéric Lopez	Gérard Jugnot (actor)	Chipaya	Salar de Uyuni (Altiplano)	Bolivia	14 September 2010	France 2	6.1 million	24.2%
15	Frédéric Lopez	Virginie Efira (former TV host and actress)	Tsaatan	Hövsgöl	Mongolia	14 December 2010	France 2	8.1 million	29.5%
16	Frédéric Lopez	Frédéric Michalak (rugby player)	Lo Lo	Lào Cai	Vietnam	1 November 2011	France 2	7.7 million	27%
17	Frédéric Lopez	Zabou Breitman (actress and film director)	Nyangatom	Omo valley	Ethiopia	8 May 2012	France 2	8.2 million	28.9%
18	Frédéric Lopez	Sylvie Testud (actress and film director)	Gorane	Ennedi Plateau	Chad	2 October 2012	France 2	6.1 million	23.7%
19	Frédéric Lopez	François-Xavier Demaison (actor and humorist)	Raïka	Rajasthan	India	24 September 2013	France 2	6.1 million	23.6%
20	Frédéric Lopez	Mélissa Theuriau (journalist)	Maasai	Arusha Region	Tanzania	21 January 2014	France 2	6.1 million	23.1%
21	Frédéric Lopez	Arthur (presenter and humorist)	Quechuas	Cuzco	Peru	2 December 2014	France 2	6.2 million	23.3%
22	Frédéric Lopez	Clovis Cornillac (actor)	Miao	Guizhou	China	12 avr 2016	France 2	5.2 million	21.9%
23	Frédéric Lopez	Mélanie Doutey (actress)	Bactrian camel husbandry	Altai	Mongolia	29 November 2016	France 2	5.0 million	20.8%
24	Frédéric Lopez	Cristiana Reali (actress)	Worrorra	Kimberley	Australia	18 avr 2017	France 2	4.1 million	16.9%
25	Frédéric Lopez	Kev Adams (humorist and actor)	Suri	Omo valley	Ethiopia	5 December 2017	France 2	4.7 million	19.1%
26	Frédéric Lopez	Thomas Pesquet (astronaut)	Kogi	Sierra Nevada de Santa Marta	Colombia	4 December 2018	France 2	5.76 million	26.2%
27	Raphaël de Casabianca	Franck Gastambide (actor and film director)	Van Gujjar	Himalayas	India	19 March 2019	France 2	4,64 millions	23,4%
28	Raphaël de Casabianca	Estelle Lefébure	Samburu	Vallée du Grand Rift	Kenya	3 December 2019	France 2	3,66 millions	16,8%
29	Raphaël de Casabianca	Nawell Madani	Yak breeders	Khangai Mountains	Mongolia	26 May 2020	France 2	3,09 million	12,5%
30	Raphaël de Casabianca	Vianney	Afars	Afar Region	Ethiopia	25 May 2021	France 2	5.6 million	24.9%
31	Raphaël de Casabianca	Oli	Vezo people		Madagascar	14 June 2022	France 2	2.8 million	14.9%
32	Raphaël de Casabianca	Jarry (humorist and actor)	Inughuit	Avannaata	Greenland	2 May 2023	France 2	3.76 million	19.2%
33	Raphaël de Casabianca	Slimane (singer)	Bijagós	Bijagós Islands	Guinea-Bissau	28 May 2024	France 2	2.81 million	14.9%
34	Raphaël de Casabianca	Tomer Sisley (actor)	Dolpo-pa	Dolpo	Nepal	26 November 2024	France 2	3.47 million	18.1%
35	Frédéric Lopez	Kendji Girac (singer)	Turkana people	Lake Turkana	Kenya	29 April 2025	France 2		
