= Tamara Vol. 2 =

- Directed by: Alexandre Castagnetti
- Screenplay by: Alexandre Castagnetti; Beatrice Fournera
- Based on: Tamara by: Christian Darasse; Benoît Drousie
- Produced by: Gaëlle Cholet; Cédric Iland; Nadia Khamlichi; Adrian Politowski; Guillaume Renouil
- Starring: Héloïse Martin; Rayane Bensetti
- Cinematography: Antoine Roch
- Edited by: Thibaut Damade
- Music by: Alexandre Castagnetti; Clément Marchand
- Production companies: Elephant Story; Nexus Factory
- Distributed by: UGC Distribution
- Release date: 4 July 2018
- Countries: France; Belgium
- Language: French
- Budget: $7.1 million
- Box office: $3.3 million

Tamara Vol. 2 is a 2018 teen comedy film directed by Alexandre Castagnetti. It is an adaptation of the comic strip of the same name by Zidrou and Christian Darasse, and is about a high school student struggling with her body shape. It is a sequel to the 2016 film Tamara.

== Cast ==
- Héloïse Martin as Tamara
- Rayane Bensetti as Diego
- Noémie Chicheportiche as Sam
- Jimmy Labeeu as Wagner
- Idrissa Hanrot as James
- Manon Azem as Elodie
- Sylvie Testud as Amandine
- Blanche Gardin as Valérie
- Cyril Gueï as Chico
- Ina Castagnetti as Yoli
- Annie Cordy as Rose
- Karidja Touré as Naima
- Panayotis Pascot as Max
- Bruno Salomone as Philippe-André Trémolo
