= Words in Blue =

- Film poster
- Les Mots bleus
- Directed by: Alain Corneau
- Screenplay by: Alain Corneau
- Based on: Leur histoire by Dominique Mainard
- Produced by: Laurent Pétin; Michèle Pétin
- Starring: Sylvie Testud; Sergi López
- Cinematography: Yves Angelo
- Edited by: Thierry Derocles
- Music by: Christophe
- Distributed by: ARP Sélection
- Release dates: 16 February 2005 (Berlinale); 23 March 2005 (France)
- Running time: 115 minutes
- Country: France
- Languages: French; French Sign Language; Catalan
- Budget: €5 million
- Box office: $661,951

Words in Blue (original title: Les Mots bleus) is a 2005 French drama film adapted from the novel Leur histoire by French author Dominique Mainard. The film was adapted and directed by Alain Corneau.

== Plot ==
Clara, (Sylvie Testud), works in a birdshop. She is concerned about her deaf-mute daughter Anna, (Camille Gauthier), whom she is bringing up on her own. She has never spoken a single word. Clara herself is illiterate. Ever since her grandmother Baba, whom she adored, had been the victim of an attack when she was reading her a story, she has always refused to learn to read and write. Now that the silence of her daughter Anna is causing her to be bullied by her peers, Clara feels obliged to withdraw her from her school, and to enrol her in a school for the deaf-mute, run by Vincent, (Sergi López). Vincent, the principal, suggests giving his new pupil particular classes to teach her Sign Language, and so facilitate Anna's integration.

== Cast ==
- Sylvie Testud as Clara
- Sergi López as Vincent
- Camille Gauthier as Anna
- Mar Sodupe as Muriel
- Cédric Chevalme as Clara's husband
- Isabelle Petit-Jacques as Anna's teacher
- Gabrielle Lopes Benites as Muriel's daughter
- Louis Pottier as Muriel's son
- Esther Gorintin as Baba
- Clarisse Baffier as Young Clara
