= Angels (1990 film) =

1990 film

- Directed by: Jacob Berger
- Written by: Jacob Berger
- Produced by: Jean-Louis Porchet; Gérard Ruey
- Starring: Belinda Becker
- Cinematography: Emmanuel Machuel
- Release date: February 1990
- Running time: 95 minutes
- Countries: Spain; Switzerland
- Language: French

Angels (Spanish: Los ángeles) is a 1990 Spanish-Swiss drama film directed by Jacob Berger. It was entered into the 40th Berlin International Film Festival.

== Premise ==
An American musician runs away with a prostitute he’s in love with.

== Cast ==
- Belinda Becker as Sara
- Steven Weber as Rickie
- Jose Esteban as Tonio
- José Esteban Alenda (as José Esteban hijo)
- Justin Williams as Thomas
- Féodor Atkine as Hugo Carrero
- Ángela Molina as Natacha
- Cristina Hoyos as La Molina
- Dolors Ducastella as Leila Michelson
- Lloll Bertran as Girl with the scar
- Yolanda Herrero as Girl with the golden teeth
- Àngels Aymar as Girl with bubble-gum
