= A Loving Father =

- French poster
- Directed by: Jacob Berger
- Written by: Pascal Barollier; Jacob Berger; Ed Radtke
- Starring: Gérard Depardieu; Guillaume Depardieu; Sylvie Testud
- Cinematography: Pascal Marti
- Distributed by: Union Générale Cinématographique (UGC)
- Release date: 13 November 2002 (France)
- Running time: 103 minutes
- Countries: France; Switzerland
- Budget: $5.4 million
- Box office: $120.000

A Loving Father (French: Aime ton père, lit. 'Love Thy Father') is a 2002 French-Swiss drama film directed by Jacob Berger and starring Gérard Depardieu, Guillaume Depardieu, and Sylvie Testud. It was selected as the Swiss entry for the Best Foreign Language Film at the 75th Academy Awards, but it was not nominated.

The story centers on the dysfunctional relationship between a young man and his father, a famous author. After the father starts a road trip to Sweden where he must collect his Nobel Prize in literature, his estranged son ends up kidnapping him in a chaotic attempt to rekindle their bond.

Upon release, reviewers noted that the film echoed Gérard and Guillaume Depardieu's publicly strained relationship. However, the story was loosely based on the director's relationship with his own father, author John Berger, rather than on the Depardieu family.

== Plot ==
Writer Leo Shepherd resides in a French Alps village with his daughter, Virginia, who has devoted his life to him; he has been estranged for years from his son, Paul, who lives in the city. Paul blames Leo for having been a largely absentee father. One day, Leo is informed that he has won the Nobel Prize.

Paul hears about Leo winning the prize and calls to congratulate him, but Virginia refuses to let him speak to their father. Against the advice of his friends, Leo decides to make his way to Sweden by motorcycle to collect his prize.

Still wishing to reconnect with his father, Paul sets off to find him. They first meet up at a gas station. Later on, Leo has an accident; he survives but is left unconscious. Having followed him by car, Paul takes advantage of Leo's shell-shocked state and kidnaps his father. Leo's identification papers are later found at the scene of the accident and he is reported dead. Having tied up Leo with yellow tape, Paul drives his captive father, forcing him to listen to his grievances.

== Cast ==
- Gérard Depardieu : Leo Shepherd
- Guillaume Depardieu : Paul
- Sylvie Testud : Virginia
- Julien Boisselier : Arthur
- Hiam Abbass : Salma
- Jacques Frantz : Antoine Levy

== Reception ==
Variety gave the film a positive review, lauding the performances of the Depardieus and Sylvie Testud. Swiss newspaper Le Temps also praised the film, calling it "courageous" in its exploration of family traumas. Critical reception in France was mixed, with Libération arguing that the emotional baggage attached to Depardieu and son prevented their characters from attaining any independent existence.

The film was a box-office failure, selling only 16,030 admissions in France.

== See also ==
- List of submissions to the 75th Academy Awards for Best Foreign Language Film
- List of Swiss submissions for the Academy Award for Best Foreign Language Film
