= The Ghost Valley =

- Directed by: Alain Tanner
- Written by: Alain Tanner
- Produced by: Marin Karmitz; Alain Tanner
- Starring: Jean-Louis Trintignant; Jacob Berger; Laura Morante
- Cinematography: Patrick Blossier
- Music by: Arié Dzierlatka
- Release date: 1987
- Language: French

The Ghost Valley (French: La Vallée fantôme, lit. 'The Phantom Valley'), is a 1987 French-Swiss drama film written and directed by Alain Tanner and starring Jean-Louis Trintignant, Jacob Berger and Laura Morante. The film was entered into the main competition at the 44th edition of the Venice Film Festival.

== Cast ==
- Jean-Louis Trintignant as Paul
- Jacob Berger as Jean
- Laura Morante as Dara
- Caroline Cartier as Madeleine
- Raymond Serra as Dara's Father
- Jane Holzer as Jane
- Françoise Michaud as The Casting Director
- Anouk Grinberg
