= Let's Dance (2019 film) =

2019 film by Ladislas Chollat

- Film poster
- Directed by: Ladislas Chollat
- Written by: Ladislas Chollat; Joris Morio
- Screenplay by: Ladislas Chollat; Joris Morio
- Starring: Rayane Bensetti; Fiorella Campanella; Guillaume de Tonquédec
- Cinematography: Philip Lozaro
- Music by: Romain Trouillet
- Distributed by: Netflix
- Release date: 27 March 2019
- Running time: 109 minutes
- Countries: France; Belgium
- Language: French

Let's Dance is a 2019 French family comedy musical drama film written and directed by Ladislas Chollat. It is a remake of 2010 British 3D film StreetDance 3D. The film stars Rayane Bensetti, Fiorella Campanella and Guillaume de Tonquédec in the lead roles. The film was released on 27 March 2019 and received mixed reviews from critics. It was also streamed via Netflix on 4 December 2019.

== Synopsis ==
Joseph (Rayanne Bensetti), passionate dancer of hip-hop, refuses to enter the company of his father to attempt his luck in Paris. With his girlfriend, Emma (Fiorella Campanella) and his best friend Karim (Mehdi Kerkouche), he joins the Paris crew of Yuri, a famous breaker to attempt to win an international competition of hip-hop.

== Cast ==
- Rayane Bensetti as Joseph
- Fiorella Campanella as Emma
- Guillaume de Tonquédec as Rémi
- Alexia Giordano as Chloé
- Mehdi Kerkouche as Karim
- Line Renaud as Nicole
