= Sandra Zidani =

- Born: 12 September 1968 (age 57); Brussels, Belgium
- Occupations: Actress, comedian, humorist, professor
- Years active: 1993–present

Sandra Zidani (or Zidani) (born 12 September 1968) is a Belgian comedian, actress, humorist and former Protestant religious professor.

== Biography ==
Zidani is of Algerian origin through her father, while her mother is Belgian, of Walloon origin. She started on stage at the age of nine. She has a degree in art history from the Université libre de Bruxelles.

== One-woman show ==
- 1993-1996 : La petite comique de la famille
- 1998 : Mon légionnaire, directed by Martine Willequet
- 1999 : Et ta sœur !?, directed by Patrick Chaboud
- 2002 : Va-t'en savoir !, directed by Patrick Chaboud
- 2004 : Journal intime d’un sex sans bol, directed by Zidani
- 2007 : Fabuleuse étoile, directed by Zidani and Patrick Chaboud
- 2008 : Zida Diva, with the band "Fortissimo"
- 2009-2011 : Moudawana Forever, with Ben Hamidou
- 2011-2012 : Mélopolis
- 2013 : Zidani fait son cirque, in the Cirque royal
- 2010-2014 : Retour en Algérie, directed by Zidani
- 2011-2014 : La rentrée d'Arlette, directed by Zidani and Patrick Chaboud
- 2013-2015 : Quiche toujours

== Theater ==
- 2016 : Welcome à Saint Tropez, directed by Rémi Rosello

== Television ==
- 2000-2003 : "Les Coups d'humour", TF1
- 2005-2006 : "Si c'était vous", RTL-TVI
- 2006-2007 : "Cinquante Degrés Nord", Arte
- 2008 : "Pliés en 4", France 4
- 2012 : "Fashion Express", Star TV
- 2012 : "Face à face", RTL-TVI
- 2012 : "Sans Chichis", La Deux
- 2012 : "Rire contre le racisme", La Deux
- 2013 : "Signé Taloche", RTBF
- 2012-2014 : "On n'demande qu'à en rire", France 2

== Filmography ==
| Year | Title | Role | Director | Notes |
|---|---|---|---|---|
| 2003 | Des plumes dans la tête | | Thomas De Thier | |
| 2003 | Un amour en kit | The Flemish | Philippe de Broca | TV movie |
| 2007 | Septième ciel Belgique | The cop | André Chandelle | TV series (1 episode) |
| 2011 | Les tribulations d'une caissière | Madame Harfouche | Pierre Rambaldi | |
| 2015 | The Roommates Party | Madeleine | Alexandra Leclère | |
| 2016 | Tamara | The science teacher | Alexandre Castagnetti | |
| 2016 | La Locataire | Madame Ranson | Sonam Larcin | Short |

== Radio ==
- 2012 : La Première, "On n'est pas rentré !"
- 2012 : La Première, "Et Dieu dans tout ça?"

== Awards ==
- 1993 : Festival Francofourires Charleroi : Press prize
- 1993 : Festival de Lobbes : Jury prize and Press prize
- 1995 : Festival de Super Dévoluy : RTL TVI Winner
- 1996 : Festival de Bruxelles : Jury prize and Public prize
- 1996 : Festival du rire à Laval : Special jury prize
