= The Roommates Party =

- Film poster
- Directed by: Alexandra Leclère
- Written by: Alexandra Leclère
- Produced by: Philippe Godeau; Jean-Yves Asselin
- Starring: Karin Viard; Didier Bourdon; Valérie Bonneton; Michel Vuillermoz; Josiane Balasko; Patrick Chesnais
- Edited by: Ronan Tronchot
- Music by: Philippe Rombi
- Production company: Pan Européenne Production
- Distributed by: Wild Bunch
- Release date: 23 December 2015
- Running time: 106 minutes
- Country: France
- Language: French
- Budget: $12.2 million
- Box office: $8.6 million

The Roommates Party (original title: Le Grand Partage) is a 2015 French comedy film directed by Alexandra Leclère.

== Plot ==
Because winter is shaping up worse than ever, the government requisitions emergency accommodation, forcing many French citizens with housing to welcome into their homes the working poor, homeless, without access to housing despite being on a payroll. A wind of panic sets in everywhere in France and especially in the 86 rue du Cherche Midi, a stately building in one of the most exclusive areas of the capital.

== Cast ==
- Karin Viard as Christine Dubreuil
- Didier Bourdon as Pierre Dubreuil
- Valérie Bonneton as Béatrice Bretzel
- Michel Vuillermoz as Grégory Bretzel
- Josiane Balasko as Bernadette
- Patrick Chesnais as The eccentric neighbor
- Firmine Richard as Philomena
- Sandra Zidani as Madeleine
- Michèle Moretti as Françoise Dubreuil
- Jackie Berroyer as Monsieur Abramovitch
- Anémone as Madame Abramovitch
- Lise Lamétrie as Madame Poil
- David Pujadas as himself
- Julian Bugier as himself
- Karine de Ménonville as herself
