= Tamara (2016 French film) =

- Theatrical release poster
- Directed by: Alexandre Castagnetti
- Screenplay by: Alexandre Castagnetti
- Based on: Tamara by: Christian Darasse; Benoît Drousie
- Produced by: Gaëlle Cholet; Guillaume Renouil; Romain Brémond; Sylvain Goldberg; Serge de Poucques; Nadia Khamlichi; Gilles Waterkeyn
- Starring: Héloïse Martin; Sylvie Testud; Rayane Bensetti; Bruno Salomone; Cyril Gueï; Oulaya Amamra; Blanche Gardin; Jimmy Labeeu
- Cinematography: Yannick Ressigeac
- Edited by: Thibaut Damade
- Music by: Alexandre Castagnetti; Clément Marchand
- Production companies: Gazelle & Cie; Elephant Story
- Distributed by: UGC Distribution
- Release date: 26 October 2016
- Running time: 103 minutes
- Countries: France; Belgium
- Language: French
- Budget: $7 million
- Box office: $5.6 million

Tamara is a 2016 teen comedy film directed by Alexandre Castagnetti. It is an adaptation of the comic strip of the same name by Zidrou and Christian Darasse, and is about a high school student struggling with her body shape. A sequel, Tamara Vol. 2, was released in 2018.

== Cast ==
- Héloïse Martin as Tamara
- Rayane Bensetti as Diego
- Sylvie Testud as Amandine
- Cyril Gueï as Chico
- Oulaya Amamra as Jelilah
- Blanche Gardin as Valérie
- Bruno Salomone as Philippe-André Trémolo
- Jimmy Labeeu as Wagner
- Ina Castagnetti as Yoli
- Lou Gala as Anaïs
- Laure Nicodème as Joy
- Mélissa Bryon as Fatou
- Clara Choï as Luan
- Zack Groyne as Zak
- Lamine Cissokho as Babacar
- Martin Jurdant as Steve
- Yasser Jaafari as José
- François Rollin as The French teacher
- Sandra Zidani as The SVT teacher
- Marie-Ève Perron as The sports teacher
- Anne-Pascale Clairembourg friend of Amandine
- Dominique Rongvaux as Marc
- Elliot Goldberg as Esteban
- Vincent Santamaria as Greg

== Production ==
Héloïse Martin was cast as Tamara, and played the part at age 20, having to gain weight for the film.
