= 49th Berlin International Film Festival =

1999 film festival in Berlin, Germany

- Festival poster
- Opening film: Aimée & Jaguar
- Closing film: Porgy and Bess
- Location: Berlin, Germany
- Founded: 1951
- Awards: Golden Bear: The Thin Red Line
- No. of films: 206 films
- Festival date: 10 –21 February 1999
- Website: Website

Berlin International Film Festival chronology
- 50th 48th

The 49th annual Berlin International Film Festival was held from 10 to 21 February 1999. The festival opened with Aimée & Jaguar by Max Färberböck.

The Golden Bear was awarded to The Thin Red Line directed by Terrence Malick.

The retrospective dedicated to Austrian-American theatre and film director Otto Preminger. 70 mm version of Preminger's 1959 musical film Porgy and Bess served as the closing night film.

== Jury ==
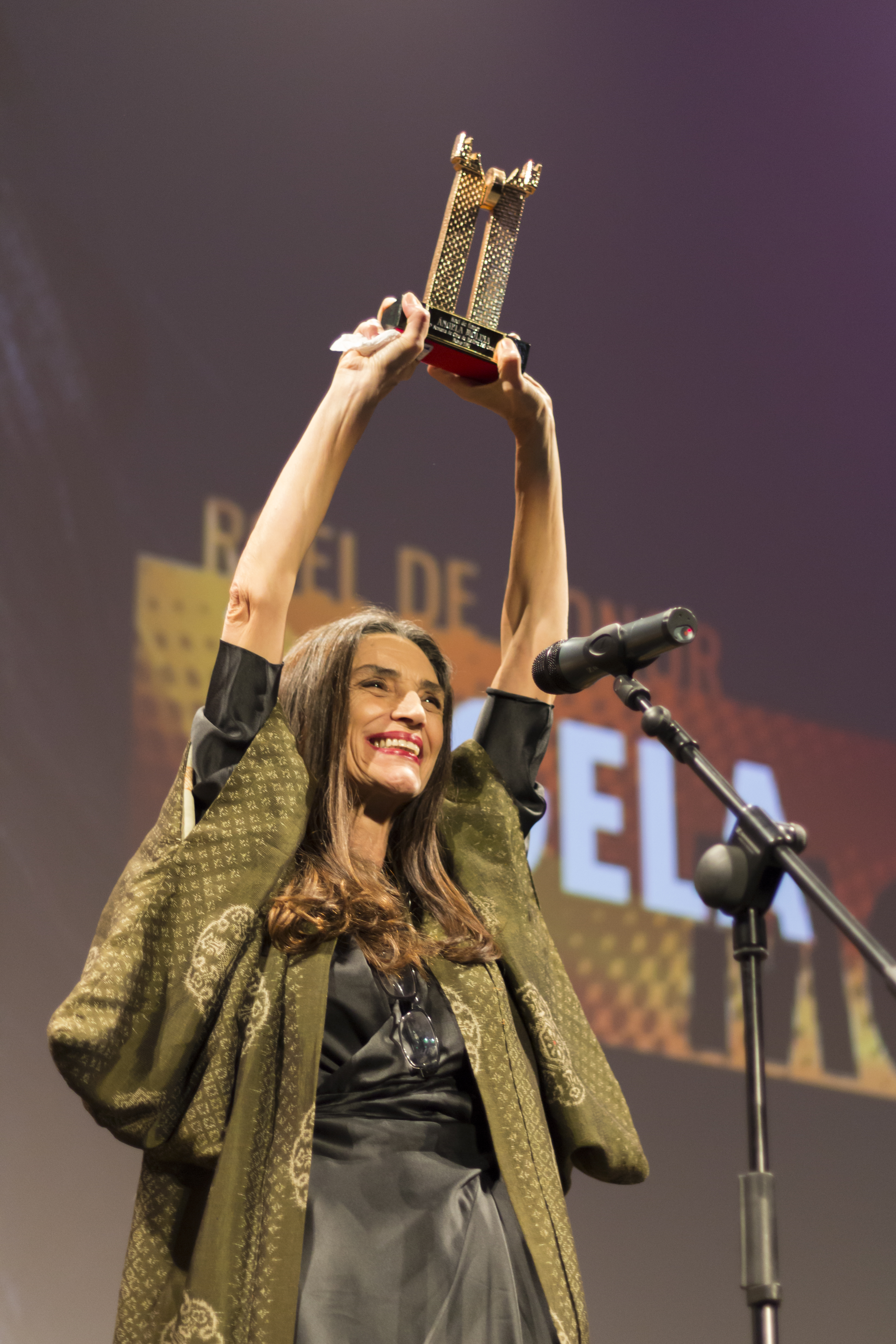
Ángela Molina, Jury President

The following people were announced as being on the jury for the festival:

- Ángela Molina, Spanish actress - Jury President
- Ken Adam, British production designer
- Paulo Branco, Portuguese producer and actor
- Assi Dayan, Israeli actor, filmmaker and producer
- Pierre-Henri Deleau, French actor and producer
- Katja von Garnier, German filmmaker
- Hellmuth Karasek, German journalist, writer and film critic
- Michelle Yeoh, Malaysian actress

== Official Sections ==
=== Main Competition ===
The following films were in competition for the Golden Bear and Silver Bear awards:

English title	Original title	Director(s)	Production Country
8mm		Joel Schumacher	United States, Germany
Aimée & Jaguar		Max Färberböck	Germany
Between Your Legs	Entre las piernas	Manuel Gómez Pereira	Spain, France
Breakfast of Champions		Alan Rudolph	United States
The Color of Lies	Au coeur du mensonge	Claude Chabrol	France
Cookie's Fortune		Robert Altman	United States
eXistenZ		David Cronenberg	Canada, United Kingdom, France
The Girl of Your Dreams	La niña de tus ojos	Fernando Trueba	Spain
Glória		Manuela Viegas	Portugal, France, Spain
The Hi-Lo Country		Stephen Frears	United States, United Kingdom, Germany
It All Starts Today	Ça commence aujourd'hui	Bertrand Tavernier	France
Journey to the Sun	Güneşe Yolculuk	Yeşim Ustaoğlu	Turkey, Netherlands, Germany
Karnaval		Thomas Vincent	France, Germany, Belgium, Switzerland
Keiho	39 刑法第三十九条	Yoshimitsu Morita	Japan
Mifune's Last Song	Mifune	Søren Kragh-Jacobsen	Denmark, Sweden
Nightshapes	Nachtgestalten	Andreas Dresen	Germany
Ordinary Heroes	千言萬語	Ann Hui	Hong Kong, China
Playing by Heart		Willard Carroll	United States, United Kingdom
Set Me Free	Emporte-moi	Léa Pool	Switzerland, Canada, France
Shakespeare in Love		John Madden	United States, United Kingdom
Simon Magus		Ben Hopkins	United States, United Kingdom, France, Germany, Italy
The Thin Red Line		Terrence Malick	Canada, United States
Three Seasons	Ba Mùa	Tony Bui	United States, Vietnam
Urban Feel	Kesher Ir	Jonathan Sagall	Israel
War in the Highlands	La Guerre dans le Haut Pays	Francis Reusser	Switzerland, France, Belgium

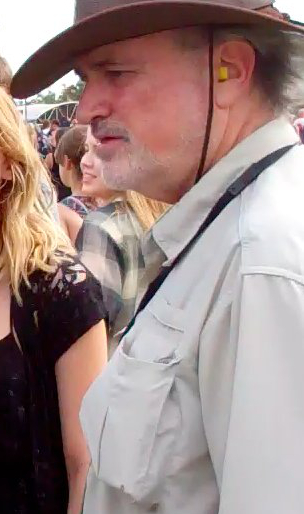
Terrence Malick, winner of the Golden Bear at the festival

== Official Awards ==
=== Main Competition ===
The following prizes were awarded by the Jury:

- Golden Bear: The Thin Red Line by Terrence Malick
- Silver Bear – Special Jury Prize: Mifune by Søren Kragh-Jacobsen
- Silver Bear for Best Director: Stephen Frears for The Hi-Lo Country
- Silver Bear for Best Actress: Maria Schrader and Juliane Köhler for Aimée & Jaguar
- Silver Bear for Best Actor: Michael Gwisdek for Nachtgestalten
- Alfred Bauer Prize: Karnaval by Thomas Vincent
- Silver Bear for an Outstanding Single Achievement: Marc Norman and Tom Stoppard for Shakespeare in Love
- Silver Bear for an Outstanding Artistic Contribution: David Cronenberg for eXistenZ
- Honourable Mention:
  - Iben Hjejle for Mifune
  - Ça commence aujourd'hui
  - John Toll for The Thin Red Line

=== Honorary Golden Bear ===
- Shirley MacLaine

=== Berlinale Camera ===
- Armen Medvedjev
- Meryl Streep
- Robert Rodriguez

== Independent Awards ==
=== Blue Angel Award ===
- Journey to the Sun by Yeşim Ustaoğlu

=== FIPRESCI Award ===
- It All Starts Today by Bertrand Tavernier

=== Teddy Awards ===
- Best Film: Show Me Love (Fucking Åmål) by Lukas Moodysson
- Best Documentary Film: The Man Who Drove with Mandela by Greta Schiller
- Best Short Film: Liu Awaiting Spring by Andrew Soo
- Jury Award: Aimée & Jaguar by Max Färberböck; Lola and Billy the Kid (Lola und Bilidikid) by Kutluğ Ataman; Gendernauts: A Journey Through Shifting Identities by Monika Treut; Piglets (Ferkel) by Luc Feit; NY'NY 'n Why Not by Michael Brynntrup
- Reader Award: Trick by Jim Fall
