= Karnaval =

1999 French film

- Theatrical release poster
- Directed by: Thomas Vincent
- Written by: Maxime Sassier; Thomas Vincent
- Produced by: Alain Rozanès; Pascal Verroust
- Starring: Sylvie Testud; Amar ben Abdallah; Clovis Cornillac; Martine Godart; Jean-Paul Rouve
- Cinematography: Dominique Bouilleret; Olivier Gallois; Colin Houben
- Edited by: Pauline Dairou
- Music by: Krishna Levy
- Distributed by: MK2 Diffusion
- Release date: 3 March 1999
- Running time: 88 minutes
- Country: France
- Language: French
- Budget: $1.9 million
- Box office: $1.3 million

Karnaval is a French film directed by Thomas Vincent and was released 3 March 1999. The film was nominated for a César Award for Best Debut in 2000. At the 49th Berlin International Film Festival in 1999 it won the Alfred Bauer Prize, a prize awarded in memory of the festival founder.

== Cast ==
- Sylvie Testud as Béa
- Amar Ben Abdallah as Larbi
- Clovis Cornillac as Christian
- Martine Godart as Isabelle
- Jean-Paul Rouve as Pine
- Thierry Bertein as Gigi
- Dominique Baeyens as Doriane
- Hervé Pierre as Verhoeven
- Malek Kateb as Larbis Vater
- Karim Attia as Nasser
- Manon Seys as Emilie
