= Héloïse Martin =

French actress (born 1996)

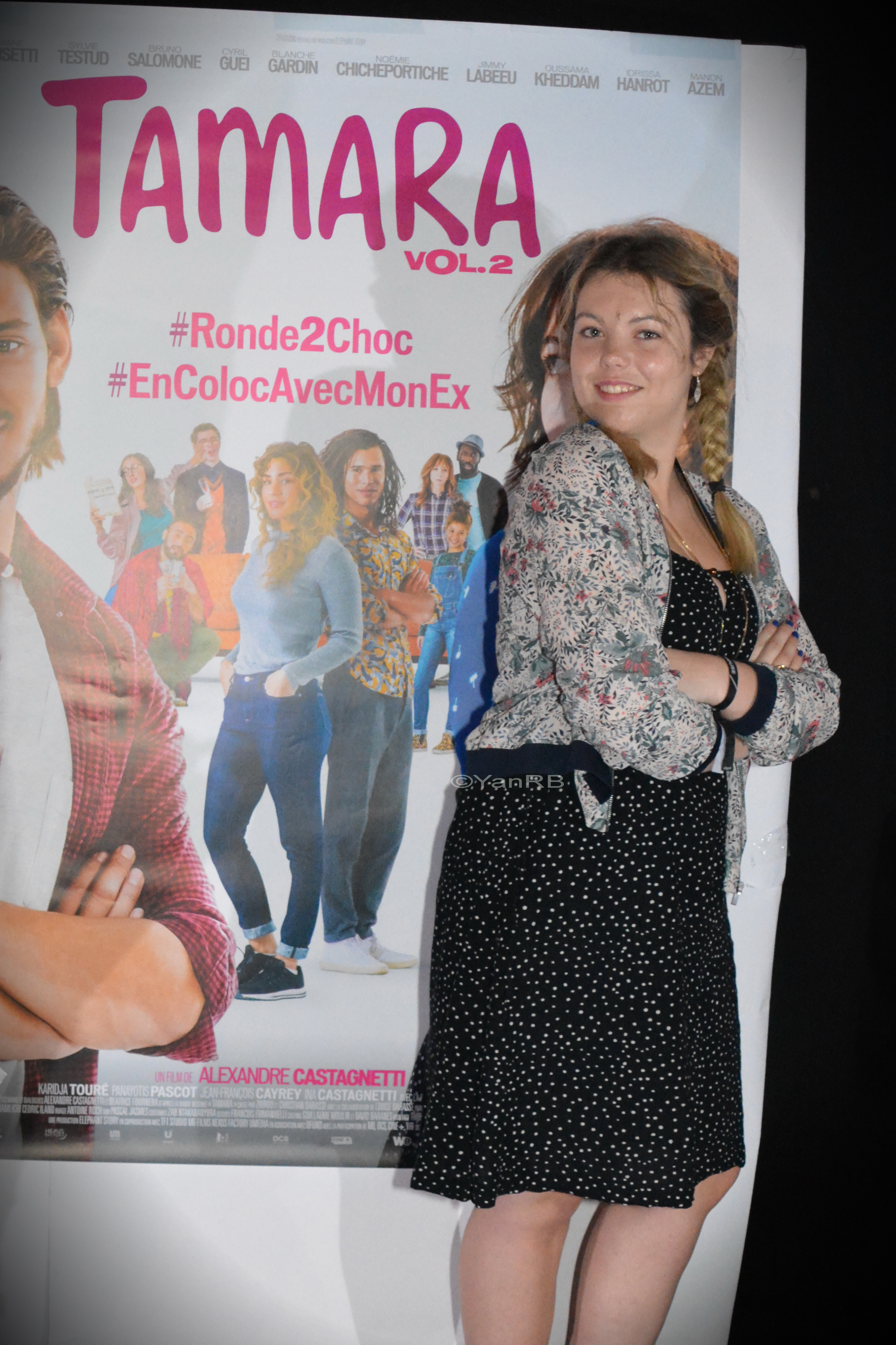
- Martin in 2018
- Born: 27 June 1996 (age 28); France
- Occupation: Actress
- Years active: 2012–present

Héloïse Martin (born 27 June 1996) is a French actress.

== Filmography ==
Year	Title	Role	Director	Notes
2012	Qu'est-ce qu'on va faire de toi ?	Anita	Jean-Daniel Verhaeghe	TV movie
2016	Tamara	Tamara	Alexandre Castagnetti	
2018	Tamara Vol. 2	Tamara	Alexandre Castagnetti	
2018	Je suis un partage	Herself	Baptiste Magontier	Short

== Theater ==
Year	Title	Author	Director	Notes
2017-2019	La nouvelle	Éric Assous	Richard Berry	Théâtre de Paris
