= The Color of Lies =

- Theatrical release poster
- Directed by: Claude Chabrol
- Screenplay by: Claude Chabrol; Odile Barski
- Produced by: Marin Karmitz
- Starring: Sandrine Bonnaire; Jacques Gamblin
- Cinematography: Eduardo Serra
- Edited by: Monique Fardoulis
- Music by: Matthieu Chabrol
- Production companies: Canal Diffusion; France 3 Cinéma; MK2 Productions
- Distributed by: MK2 Diffusion
- Release date: 13 January 1999
- Running time: 111 minutes
- Country: France
- Language: French
- Box office: US$111,143

The Color of Lies (French: Au cœur du mensonge) is a 1999 psychological mystery film co-written and directed by Claude Chabrol. The film was entered into the 49th Berlin International Film Festival.

== Plot ==
In a small town in Brittany, a 10-year-old girl is found murdered. The last person known to see her alive was her art teacher and professional artist, René (Gamblin). He becomes the primary suspect in the investigation by the new chief of police, Frédérique Lesage (Bruni-Tedeschi). The investigation destroys his life as the townspeople believe that he is the killer, despite the lack of hard evidence. René is dedicated to his wife (Bonnaire), a nurse whose perpetual happy mood is the polar opposite of his dour personality. Meanwhile, Frederique becomes better acquainted with the eccentric residents of the town, including an arrogant television journalist, (de Caunes), a small-time crook who fences stolen goods (Marlot), and a bizarre pair of married shopkeepers (Ogier and Simsolo).

== Principal cast ==
Actor	Role
Sandrine Bonnaire	Vivianne Sterne
Jacques Gamblin	René Sterne
Antoine de Caunes	Germain-Roland Desmot
Valeria Bruni Tedeschi	Frédérique Lesage
Bernard Verley	Inspector Loudun
Bulle Ogier	Évelyne Bordier
Pierre Martot	Regis Marchal
Adrienne Pauly	Anna
Thomas Chabrol	The medical examiner

== Critical reception ==
The film received favorable reviews.

Variety:

A delicious sense of suspense haunts Claude Chabrol's latest character-study-cum-whodunit... which ranks just behind the excellent “La ceremonie” among the veteran helmer’s work this decade.

Michael Thomson of BBC Films said:

Director Claude Chabrol, one of the most successful members of the French New Wave, is still (after a hugely busy career) able to breathe life into suspense with subtlety, irony, and humour... Chabrol, forever asking us to spot detail, ensures that every one counts. A work of superior acting and quiet strength.

Michael Atkinson of The Village Voice said:

A superb sociological mystery, The Color of Lies (1999) examines what happens to a small Breton village when a schoolgirl's raped body is discovered in the woods... In his surest Simenonian mode, Chabrol balances the hidden, the exposed, and the philosophical with little fuss, and the characters are all drawn with a scalpel.

Christopher Null of Filmcritic.com said:

Claude Chabrol's late-career films haven't been entirely inspired, but The Color of Lies is one of the standouts... The sole lacking spot here is the dead fish of a police detective (Valeria Bruni Tedeschi), who's ostensibly the hero of the film yet comes off as incompetent and bumbling at best. In fact, better casting all around could have elevated this film to a minor classic.
