= Bibie =

- Born: Beatrice Adjorkor Anyankor; January 9, 1957 (age 69)
- Origin: Ghana
- Genres: Pop
- Occupation: Singer
- Years active: 1985–2003

Bibie (pseudonym of Béatrice Adjorkor Anyankor, born on January 9, 1957, in Accra, Ghana) is a singer, famous for her 1985 hit "Tout doucement".

== Biography ==
Her childhood was marked by many countries where her father, a Ghanaian diplomat, was sent. Quickly, Bibie decided to devote herself to singing, to the detriment of her studies.

After having tried several styles of Afro-American music, she moved to Paris, where she met the famous composer Jean-Paul Dréau. This song became a huge success in 1985, reaching number two in France. Certified Gold disc, the song was covered by Dalida in Italian-language and by Bibie herself in English-language. She also met success with "J'veux pas savoir", number 6 in France in 1986. She released the song "Tout simplement" in 1985, but was not able to repeat the same feat.

In the early 90s, Bibie continued her career, but enthusiasm of the public for her songs was no longer the same. As many other French female singers of the 1980s such as Sabine Paturel or Desireless, she fell again into anonymity.

After making a comeback on French television, Bibie released an album in 2004 in the musical style of Tracy Chapman. While it was musically a critical success, the album was not fully embraced by her traditional audience. In the same year, she also took part in a French television show on the TF1 station called "Retour Gagnant" ("Winning Comeback"), where Julie Petri was the winner of the first season, and which was won this time by French singer Jean-Luc Lahaye.

In 2010, Bibie took part in a music radio tour called "RFM party 80"

== Discography ==
=== Albums ===
- 1985 : Bibie
- 1986 : Regards
- 1988 : Tendress'moi
- 1990 : La P'tite Black
- 1992 : Femme d'ici ou d'ailleurs
- 2003 : Sereine

=== Singles ===
- 1985 : "Tout doucement" – No. 2 in France
- 1986 : "J'veux pas l'savoir" – No. 6 in France
- 1986 : "Les femmes reviennent et les hommes s'en vont"
- 1988 : "Tout simplement"
