= Thomas Vincent (director) =

French film director (born 1964)

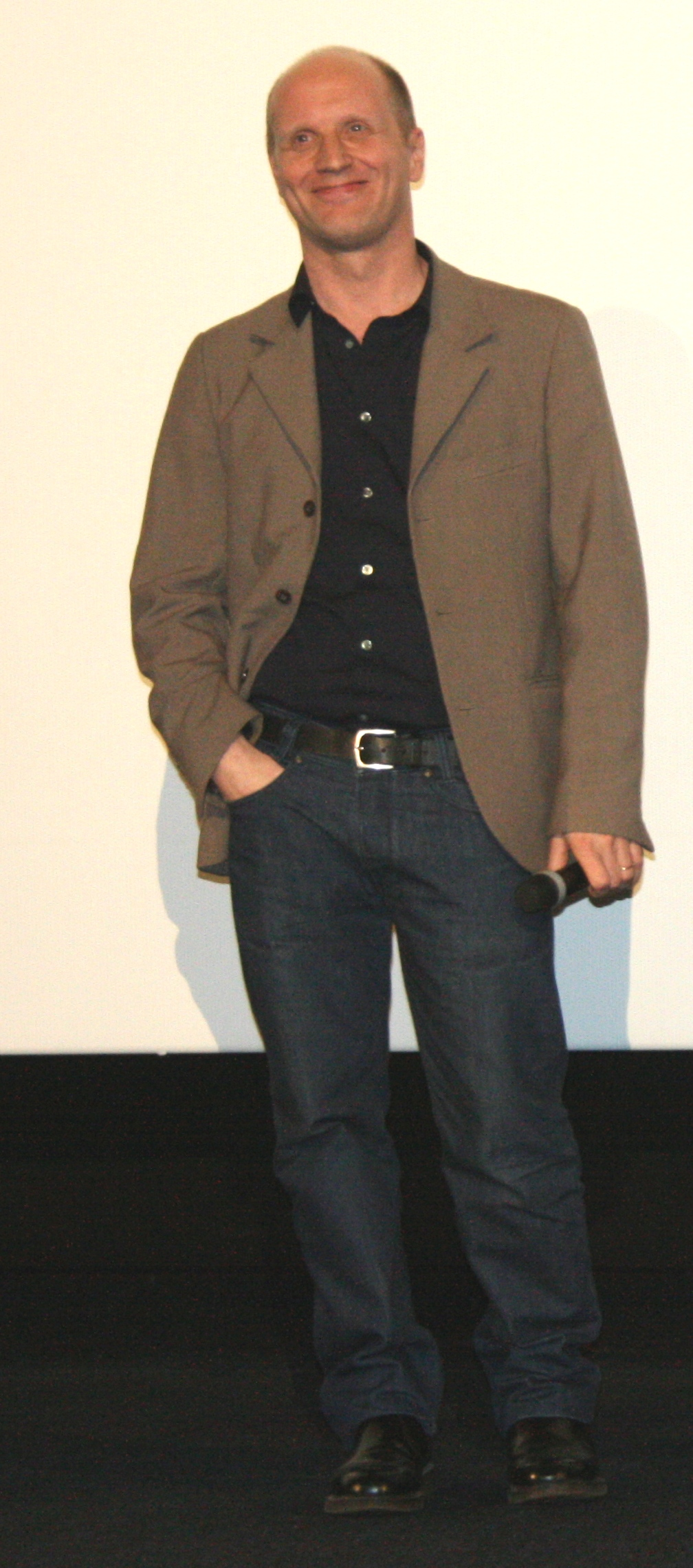
- Born: 1964 (age 61–62); Juvisy-sur-Orge, Essonne, France
- Occupations: Film director, screenwriter, actor
- Years active: 1992-present

Thomas Vincent (born 1964) is a French film director, screenwriter and actor. His 1999 film Karnaval was entered into the 49th Berlin International Film Festival where it won the Alfred Bauer Prize. He is the son of Hélène Vincent.

== Selected filmography ==
- Karnaval (1999)
- The Hook (2004)
- Mister Bob (2011)
- The New Life of Paul Sneijder (La nouvelle vie de Paul Sneijder) (2016)
- Role Play (2024)
- Masterplan (2026)
