= Sylvie Testud =

French actress (born 1971)

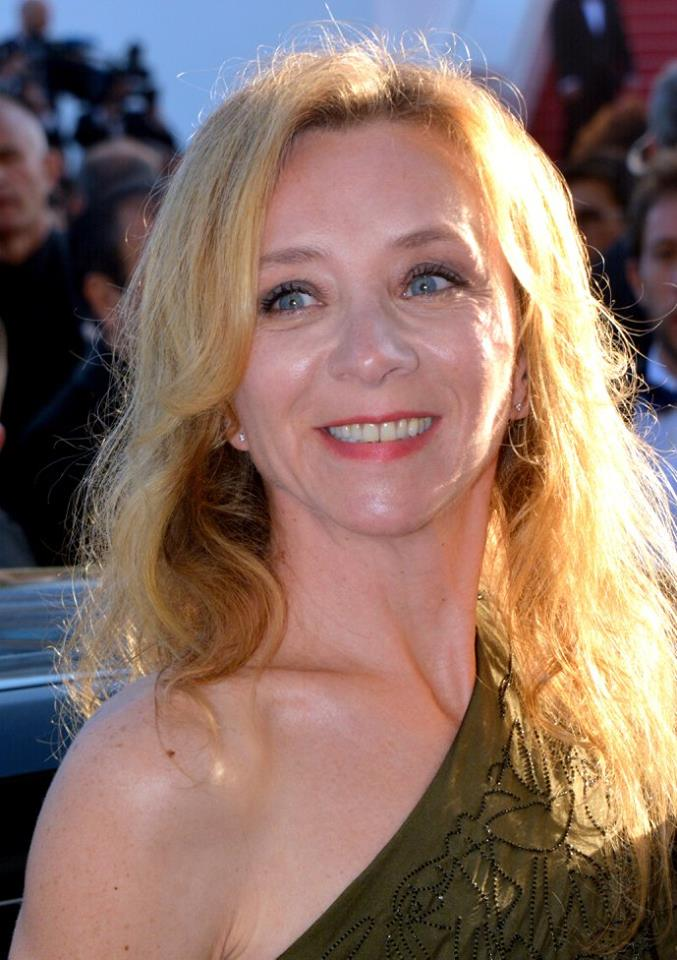
- Testud in 2018
- Born: 17 January 1971 (age 55); Lyon, France
- Occupation: Actress
- Years active: 1991–present
- Children: 2
- Honours: Ordre national du Mérite

Sylvie Testud (born 17 January 1971) is a French actress whose film career began in 1991. She won the César Award for Most Promising Actress for Murderous Maids (2000), the César Award for Best Actress for Fear and Trembling (2003), and the European Film Award for Best Actress for Lourdes (2009). Her other film roles include Beyond Silence (1996), La Vie en Rose (2007), and French Women (2014).

== Life and career ==
Testud grew up in the La Croix-Rousse quarter of Lyon, France. This was an area with many Portuguese, Spanish, and Italian immigrants. Her mother immigrated from Italy in the 1960s. Her French father left the family when Sylvie was just two years old.

In 1985, when she was 14, she saw Charlotte Gainsbourg in her role of the complex young girl in L'Effrontée, a film directed by Claude Miller, identified with Gainsbourg, and so took drama classes in Lyon with the actor and director Christian Taponard. In 1989, she moved to Paris and spent three years at the Conservatoire (CNSAD). In the early and mid 1990s, she landed her first small roles in films like L'Histoire du garçon qui voulait qu'on l'embrasse, directed by Philippe Harel, and Love, etc., directed by Marion Vernoux. In 1997 she had great success in Germany with Caroline Link's Jenseits der Stille for which she learned German, sign language, and the clarinet. In 1998 she had her first major role in French cinema playing Béa in Thomas Vincent's Karnaval. In 2000 she starred in Chantal Akerman's La Captive, an adaptation of La Prisonière, the fifth part of Marcel Proust's À la recherche du temps perdu. In 2001 she won the César Award for Most Promising Actress for her portrayal of Christine Papin, one of the Papin sisters, in Les Blessures assassines (English title: Murderous Maids). The story concerned a young servant woman found guilty of the murder, with her sister's help, of her employer's wife and daughter; it had made sensational headlines in France in 1933.

In 2003, she published the autobiographical book Il n'y a pas beaucoup d'étoiles ce soir, with anecdotes of her day-to-day life as an actress. The French edition featured a cover designed by her sister Ghislaine.

One of her most noted performances was as the star of the film Stupeur et tremblements, adapted from the novel by Amélie Nothomb, for which she was awarded a César and a Lumière Award for Best Actress in 2004. She plays a woman struggling with the difference in culture between the Japanese business world and the western, Belgian world, from which she comes. In 2005 or 2006 she returned to her native Lyon (to the Théâtre de la Croix Rousse), where she played the rôle of Edith in Philippe Faure's adaptation of Stefan Zweig's La Pitié dangereuse. She starred in 2007's two-time Academy Award-winning film La Vie en rose, as Momone, Edith Piaf's best friend. In the 2008 film Sagan, she portrayed the writer Françoise Sagan, earning unanimous praise for her hauntingly accurate portrayal and for which she was again nominated for the César for best actress.

She was made Chevalier (Knight) of the Ordre national du Mérite in March 2009.

She has a son, Ruben, born on 15 February 2005, and a daughter Esther, born in January 2011 with the same partner, whose name she did not make public.

In 2012, she participated in Rendez-vous en terre inconnue.

== Filmography ==
=== Feature films ===
Year	Title	Role	Director	Notes
1993	Couples et amants	The young girl	John Lvoff	
1994	The Story of a Boy Who Wanted to Be Kissed	Girl at party offering food	Philippe Harel	
1994	Marie's Song	Marie	Niko von Glasow	
1995	Those Were the Days	Sylvie	Didier Haudepin	
1996	Beyond Silence	Lara	Caroline Link	German Film Awards – Best Actress
1997	Flames in Paradise	Esther	Markus Imhoof	
1998	Sentimental Education	Julia	C. S. Leigh	
1998	The Misadventures of Margaret	Young Nun	Brian Skeet	
1998	Petit Point & Antoine	Laurence	Caroline Link	
1998	Karnaval	Béa	Thomas Vincent	Nomination César Award Most Promising Actress
1999	Annaluise & Anton	Laurence	Caroline Link	
1999	In Heaven	Valeska	Michael Bindlechner	
2000	La Captive	Ariane	Chantal Akerman	
2000	Sade	Renée de Sade	Benoît Jacquot	
2000	Murderous Maids	Christine Papin	Jean-Pierre Denis	César Award-Most Promising Actress
2000	La Chambre obscure	Azalaïs	Marie-Christine Questerbert	
2001	The Chateau	Isabelle	Jesse Peretz	
2001	Julies Geist	Julia	Bettina Wilhelm	
2001	I'm Going Home	Ariel	Manoel de Oliveira	
2002	Everyman's Feast	Sophie	Fritz Lehner	
2002	A Moment of Happiness	The teacher	Antoine Santana	
2002	Les Femmes... ou les enfants d'abord...	Virginie	Manuel Poirier	
2002	Tangos volés	Alice/Paula	Eduardo de Gregorio	
2002	A Loving Father	Virginia	Jacob Berger	
2002	Vivre me tue	Myriam	Jean-Pierre Sinapi	
2003	Fear and Trembling	Amélie	Alain Corneau	César Awards-Best Actress; Lumière Awards-Best Actress
2003	Sole Sisters	Tina	Pierre Jolivet	
2003	Dédales	Claude	René Manzor	
2004	Tomorrow We Move	Charlotte	Chantal Akerman	
2004	Tout pour l'oseille	Prune	Bertrand Van Effenterre	
2004	Cause toujours !	Léa	Jeanne Labrune	
2004	Victoire	Victoire	Stéphanie Murat	
2004	Words in Blue	Clara	Alain Corneau	
2005	It's Our Life!	Louise Delhomme	Gérard Krawczyk	
2006	L'Héritage	Patricia	Temur Babluani	
2007	La Vie en rose	Mômone (Simone Berteaut)	Olivier Dahan	Nomination César Award Best Supporting Actress
2007	La France	Camille	Serge Bozon	
2007	Ce que mes yeux ont vu	Lucie	Laurent de Bartillat	Nomination Lumière Award for Best Actress
2008	Sagan	Françoise Sagan	Diane Kurys	Globes de Cristal Awards- Best Actress; Nomination César Award Best Actress; Nomination Lumière Award for Best Actress
2008	Mange, ceci est mon corps	Madame	Michelange Quay	
2009	L'Idiot	Daria Alexeïevna	Pierre Léon	
2009	Je ne dis pas non	Adèle	Iliana Lolic	
2009	Lucky Luke	Calamity Jane	James Huth	
2009	Vengeance	Irène Thompson	Johnnie To	
2009	A Happy Man (Le Bonheur de Pierre)	Catherine Martin	Robert Ménard	
2009	Gamines	Sibylle	Éléonore Faucher	
2009	Lourdes	Christine	Jessica Hausner	European Film Awards-Best Actress
2010	The Round Up	Bella Zygler	Roselyne Bosch	
2010	Mumu	Mumu	Joël Séria	
2010	Avant l'aube	Sylvie Poncet	Raphaël Jacoulot	
2011	Rebellion	Chantal Legorjus	Mathieu Kassovitz	
2012	The Scapegoat	Bela	Charles Sturridge	
2012	À votre bon cœur, mesdames	Lolita	Jean-Pierre Mocky	
2012	Les Mains de Roxana	Roxana Orlac	Philippe Setbon	
2013	Max	Nina	Stéphanie Murat	
2013	Une chanson pour ma mère	Sylvie	Joël Franka	
2013	For a Woman	Anne	Diane Kurys	
2013	Je m'appelle Hmmm...	Céline's mother	agnès b.	
2014	96 hours	Marion Reynaud	Frédéric Schoendoerffer	
2014	24 Days	Brigitte Farell	Alexandre Arcady	
2014	French Women	Sam	Audrey Dana	
2014	Papa Was Not a Rolling Stone	Nadège	Sylvie Ohayon	
2014	Géographie du cœur malchanceux	Sophie	David Allain; Alexandra Billington	
2015	Le Talent de mes amis	Stéphane Brunge	Alex Lutz	
2015	Au plus près du Soleil	Sophie Picard	Yves Angelo	
2015	Deux femmes	Elisaveta Bogdanovna	Vera Glagoleva	
2016	Arrête ton cinéma	Sybille Teyssier	Diane Kurys	
2016	The Visitors: Bastille Day	Charlotte de Robespierre	Jean-Marie Poiré	
2016	Le Correspondant	Eloïse (Malo's mother)	Jean-Michel Ben Soussan	
2016	Tamara	Amandine (Tamara's mother)	Alexandre Castagnetti	
2017	Jour J	Clarisse	Reem Kherici	
2017	Final Portrait	Annette Arm	Stanley Tucci	
2018	Suspiria	Miss Griffith	Luca Guadagnino	
2018	Comme des rois	Val	Xabi Molia	
2018	Tamara Vol. 2	Amandine (Tamara's mother)	Alexandre Castagnetti	
2021	Flashback	Olympe de Gouges	Caroline Vigneaux	
2025	Where Souls Go (Où vont les âmes?)	Mother	Brigitte Poupart	

=== Television ===
Year	Title	Role	Director
1995	Lettre ouverte à Lili	Virginie	Jean-Luc Trotignon
1995	Le Nid tombé de l'oiseau	Laurence	Alain Schwartzstein
2009	L'une chante, l'autre aussi	Herself	Olivier Nicklaus
2010	Louise Michel	Louise Michel	Sólveig Anspach
2011	Le Grand Restaurant	A Client	Gérard Pullicino
2012	Rendez-vous en terre inconnue	Herself	
2013	Les Déferlantes	Louise	Éleonore Faucher
2014	Ceux qui dansent sur la tête	Catherine	Magaly Richard-Serrano
2014	Fais pas ci, fais pas ça	Sylviane Chinsky, the marriage therapist	Pascal Chaumeil
2017	Maximilian	Charlotte de Savoie	Andreas Prochaska
2018	Germanized	Odile	Denis Dercourt

=== Director ===
Year	Title	Notes
1998	Je veux descendre	Short
2012	Another Woman's Life	

== Decorations ==
- Officer of the Order of Arts and Letters (2016)

== Awards and nominations ==
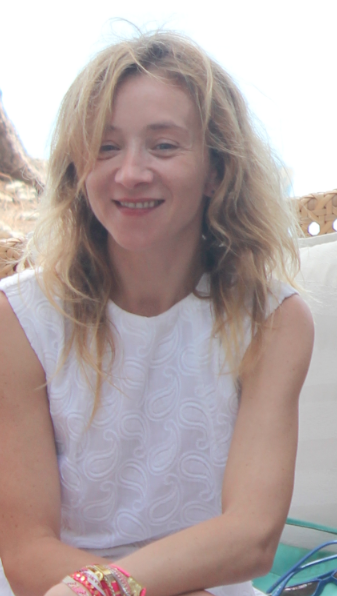
Testud in 2013

=== Deutscher Filmpreis ===
Year	Nominated work	Category	Result
1997	Beyond Silence	Best Actress	Won

=== César Awards ===
Year	Nominated work	Category	Result
2000	Karnaval	Most Promising Actress	Nominated
2001	Murderous Maids	Most Promising Actress	Won
2004	Fear and Trembling	Best Actress	Won
2008	La Vie en rose	Best Supporting Actress	Nominated
2009	Sagan	Best Actress	Nominated

=== Lumière Awards ===
Year	Nominated work	Category	Result
2004	Fear and Trembling	Best Actress	Won
2008	Ce que mes yeux ont vu	Best Actress	Nominated
2009	Sagan	Best Actress	Nominated

=== Globes de Cristal Awards ===
Year	Nominated work	Category	Result
2009	Sagan	Best Actress	Won

=== European Film Awards ===
Year	Nominated work	Category	Result
2010	Lourdes	Best Actress	Won
