= Jacques Chazot =

French dancer and socialite

Jacques Chazot in 1985

Jacques Chazot, (b. 25 September 1928 in Locmiquélic (Morbihan), d. 12 July 1993 in Monthyon (Seine-et-Marne) was a French dancer and socialite.

== Biography ==
He joined Opéra de Paris in 1947 as a dancer. In 1956, he joined Opéra-Comique. The same year, he wrote Les Carnets de Marie-Chantal, creating a character who is the archetype of the snobbish socialite.

He was a very close friend of Françoise Sagan, Juliette Gréco, Régine, Claude Bessy, Hassan II among others and a companion of Coco Chanel.

He became famous through television, dancing in many television shows of the 1970s. He was at the time one of the few people to appear on television as openly gay.

He had oral cancer, and died aged 64. In his last years, he lived in a castle of Monthyon, a property in the vicinity of Paris owned by Jean-Claude Brialy.

== Bibliography ==
- Les carnets de Marie-Chantal, Van Moppès, 1956
- Sophie Ripaille, R. Julliard, 1960
- Pense-bêtes, R. Solar, 1964
- Chazot Jacques, Paris, Stock, 1975, 238 p.
- À nous deux les femmes, Olivier Orban, 1978
- La mémoire des autres, Mengès, 1982
- Marie-Chantal de gauche !, Mengès, 1983
