= Katrina Grey =

Slovak actress

- Born: Katarina Greguskova; January 11, 1991 (age 35); Ilava, Czechoslovakia
- Occupations: Actress; Screenwriter; Director
- Years active: 2013–present
- Known for: Hard Target 2 Ghost House; Brice 3
- Website: greyfilms.co.uk

Katrina Grey is a Slovak actress who is best known for the Hollywood movie Hard Target 2 as Kay Sutherland, and the French movie Brice 3.

== Early life ==
Katrina Grey was born as Katarina Greguskova in Ilava, Slovakia. Following her film debut, she created her stage name, Katrina Grey. At a young age, she began studying at ZUS drama school where she was involved in various types of dance, taking singing lessons, playing the Accordion and performing in theatre. She studied grammar school at Gymnazium Ludovita Stura in Trenčín, Slovakia where she received a scholarship through the Rotary club International to study in Mexico at Colegio de Chihuahua, where she continued performing in theatre. It is here she received the prize for Best Performance in the musical “Cats” in Spanish.

After her exchange program in Mexico, she continued her studies at Mendel University Brno, Czech Republic, where she received a bachelor and masters's degree in International Development Studies. Katrina Grey is fluent in English, Spanish and French, advanced in Russian, in addition to her native tongue Slovak and Czech. Katrina Grey loves adrenaline sports, writing, music and is also a certified scuba diver.

== Career ==
Grey was first featured as a model in Honolulu Street Pulse's magazine in 2013 after being approached by photographer Tony Grillo in Honolulu, Hawaii ( Artistic Mindz Photography). Following this opportunity, she continued shooting TV commercials and movies whilst learning on-screen action fighting and combat. Her first taste of Hollywood was working with Blake Lively (Savages, Age of Adaline) in the psychological drama All I See Is You, starring Jason Clarke (Terminator Genisys, Everest) and directed by Marc Forster (Quantum of Solace, World War Z).

Grey made her on-screen debut in the short movie "Return of the Golden Lily", directed by Takashi Hirose and Magnus Thors, which was shot in Thailand. The film received the Experienced Vision Award for "Best Film" at the Thailand International Film Destination Festival 2014. Not long after this, she landed a role in Takashi Hirose's upcoming horror movie "BRUTAL" shot in Japan starring alongside Naho Nakashima (Final Fantasy XIII).

Grey made her American feature film debut in the movie Ghost House directed by Rich Ragsdale (According to Jim, Less than Perfect), alongside Scout Taylor-Compton (Halloween, Halloween II, The Runaways) and James Landry Hébert (Super 8, Looper). The movie was produced by KNR Productions and Benetone Films.

Having proven herself as a talented actress, Grey was cast in Hard Target 2 (2016), the sequel to Jean-Claude Van Damme's (Universal Soldier, Kickboxer), Hard Target (1993), alongside Scott Adkins (The Expendables 2, The Bourne Ultimatum), Robert Knepper and Rhona Mitra. Hard Target 2 is directed by Roel Reiné (Death Race 2, The Scorpion King 3: Battle for Redemption) released by Universal Studios.

In 2015, Grey appeared in an episode for a Travel Show for Slovak TV channel RTVS called Cestou Necestou shot in Bangkok, Thailand. No long after, Grey got a role in the French comedy Brice 3 acting alongside Oscar winning actor Jean Dujardin (The Artist, The Wolf of Wall Street) and Clovis Cornillac (Asterix at the Olympic Games).Brice 3 is French comedy written and directed by James Huth (Brice de Nice, Hellphone) and is the sequel to the successful original film Brice de Nice.

In 2017, Grey starred in the movie Locked Up directed by Jared Cohn (12/12/12, Jailbait). Grey also appeared in the movie Troy 2 where she played Helen of Troy directed by Tekin Girkin (The Incision, Peaceful Oblivion) starring Dylan Vox (Hercules Reborn, Dead 7) produced by Benetone Films . She also played the role of a German mother in the Indie short film called Milk produced by Korean female director Yu Jin Jang.

In 2018, Grey played the role of “Green” in the episode Kobe, which is part of the sci-fi series called Future sex produced by H1 films for Blackpills and directed by MacGregor and Bruno Zacarias.

Katrina Grey is also a Screenwriter. In 2020, Grey has written a psychological drama/thriller called Daytime Nightmare and wrote a horror/thriller movie called Hostel Paradise and starred in Malaysian zombie horror called Infeksi Zombie- Belaban Hidup. She is also a member of Equity and Spotlight.

== Filmography ==
=== Film ===
Year	Title	Role	Director	Notes
2014	Return of the Golden Lily	Ariana	Takashi Hirose; Magnus Thors	Thailand Film Destination Festival/ Short film
2016	All I See Is You	Stand-in: Blake Lively	Marc Forster	SC Films, Link Entertainment/ Feature film
2016	Brice 3	Braice kisseuse	James Huth	Mandarine films, M6 Films, Gaumont/ Feature film
2016	Hard Target 2	Kay Sutherland	Roel Reine	Universal Pictures, Living Films/ Feature film
2017	Ghost House	Robert's Girlfriend	Rich Ragsdale	KNR Productions, Benetone Films/ Feature film
2017	Locked Up	Kat	Jared Cohn	Benetone films, credited as Kat Grey
2017	Troy the Odyssey	Helen of Troy	Tekin Girkin	Benetone films
2018	Brutal	Anna	Takashi Hirose	Indie Feature Film
2019	Milk	German Mother	Yu Jin Jang	Korean Film
2020	Captured	Emma Williams	Ross W. Clarkson	Capricorn Media
2021	Decline	Vanessa	Sam Mason Bell	Trash Arts Productions
2021	The Bangkok Job	Lady Elaine	Clive Saunders	Monrey Films
2021	Wildtrack	Lina	Dante Del Mare	Pop Art Film Factory
2021	Infeksi Zombie- Belaban Hidup	Christine	Ray Lee	Malaysian Feature Film
2021	Daytime Nightmare	Lucy	Katrina Grey	Grey Films
2022	Fistful of Vengeance	Interpol Agent	Roel Reine	Living Films

=== Television ===
Year	Title	Role	Production	Notes
2015	Robinson Sweden TV Show Promo	Main Girl	Niklas Ladberg	Chimney group
2015	Cestou Necestou	Herself	Tibor Patay	RTVS Channel; No Sound Label
2016	Peta Asia	Herself	Behind The Leather campaign	TV commercial
2017	Xtreme Waterparks	Herself	High Noon Entertainment	Welcome To Splashtown S7E5
2018	Eullenia	French Ambassador's wife	Paul Spurrier	TV Mini Series
2019	Future Sex	Green	Bruno Zacarias & MacGregor	Black Pills TV Series
2021	The Serpent	Vanessa Knippenberg	Hans Herbots	BBC ONE/ NETFLIX TV Series
2021	Extraordinary Siamese Story: Eng and Chang	Fanny	Kulp Kaljareuk	Kantana Motion Pictures

=== Screenwriter ===
Year	Title	Genre	Notes
2021	Daytime Nightmare	Psychological Drama/Thriller	Writer & Director
2021	Zero One	Thriller/Horror	Writer & Director
2021	Realm	Action/Thriller	Writer & Director

== See also ==
- All I See Is You (film)
- Blake Lively
