= Lucky Luke (2009 film) =

2009 Western adventure film

- Theatrical release poster
- Directed by: James Huth
- Screenplay by: Sonja Shillito; James Huth; Jean Dujardin
- Based on: Lucky Luke by Morris
- Produced by: Saïd Ben Saïd; Yves Marmion
- Starring: Jean Dujardin; Michaël Youn; Sylvie Testud
- Cinematography: Stéphane Le Parc
- Edited by: Frédérique Olszak; Antoine Vareille
- Music by: Bruno Coulais
- Production companies: UGC YM; Union Générale Cinématographique; France 2 Cinéma; France 3 Cinéma; Captain Movies; Sofica UGC 1 Canal+ CinéCinéma; Procirep; Angoa-Agicoa
- Distributed by: UGC Distribution (France)
- Release date: 21 October 2009
- Running time: 103 minutes
- Countries: France; Argentina
- Languages: French; Spanish
- Budget: €26.2 million
- Box office: $17.6 million

Lucky Luke is a 2009 French-Argentine Western adventure film directed by James Huth and starring Jean Dujardin, who also co-wrote the screenplay. It is based on the comic series of the same name by Morris. The film includes a cameo by Argentine writer and TV host Alberto Laiseca.

== Plot ==
Delegated by (fictitious) US President Winston H. Jameson to secure Daisy Town in order to make the junction of the East-West railway in time, "Lucky" Luke (referred to as "John Luke" in this film) returns to his hometown, now dominated by the crook Pat Poker. Haunted by old demons, Lucky Luke sees his ambitions to start a new life and "make it clean" soon thwarted by the arrival of old enemies.

== Cast ==
- Jean Dujardin ... "Lucky" John Luke
- Michaël Youn ... Billy the Kid
- Sylvie Testud ... Calamity Jane
- Daniel Prévost ... Pat Poker
- Alexandra Lamy ... Belle
- Melvil Poupaud ... Jesse James
- Jean-François Balmer ... The Governor
- André Oumansky ... President
- Gabriel Corrado ... Luke's Father
- Pompeyo Audivert ... Undertaker
- Atilio Pozzobon ... Barman
- Alberto Laiseca ... Dick Digger
- Bruno Salomone ... Jolly Jumper (voice)
- Mathias Sandor ... Young Luke
- Carolina Presno ... Luke's Mother

== Reception ==
Lucky Luke received mixed reviews. While the direction, visual style and acting received acclaim, the screenplay received criticism.
