= Bruno Salomone =

French actor and comedian (1970–2026)

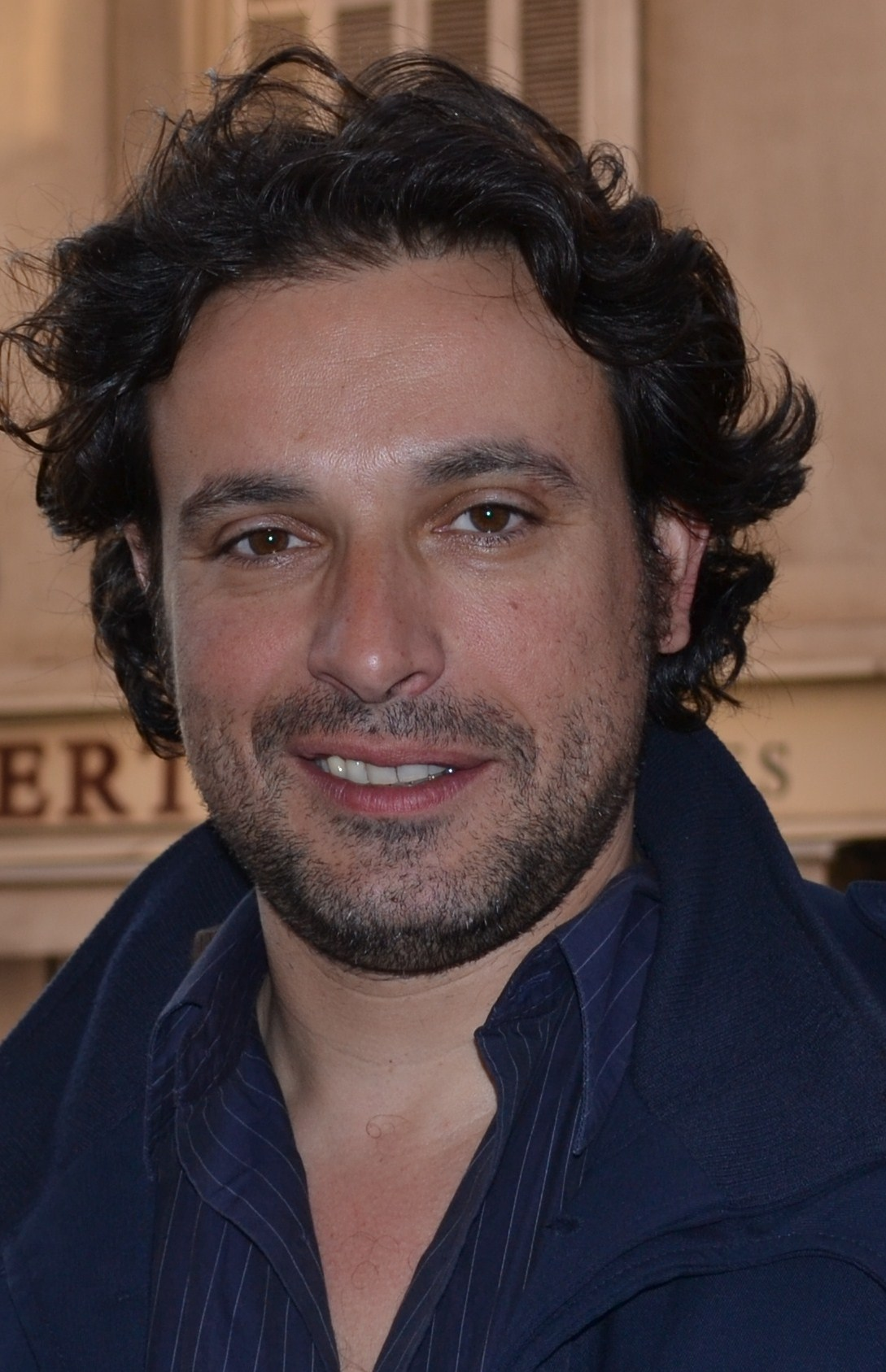
- Salomone in 2012
- Born: 13 July 1970; Villeneuve-Saint-Georges, France
- Died: 15 March 2026 (aged 55); Joinville-le-Pont, France
- Occupations: Actor; comedian
- Years active: 2001–2026

Bruno Salomone (French pronunciation: [bʁyno salomɔn]; 13 July 1970 – 15 March 2026) was a French actor and comedian. He was also active in dubbing. He became famous in his homeland for his role as Denis Bouley in the cult television series Fais pas ci, fais pas ça (2007–2017).

Salomone died in 2026 at the age of 55, following a long illness.

== Early life ==
Bruno Salomone was born an only child in Villeneuve-Saint-Georges, to a Flemish mother and Sicilian father. His mother was a seamstress, and his father was an astrology-obsessed plumber.

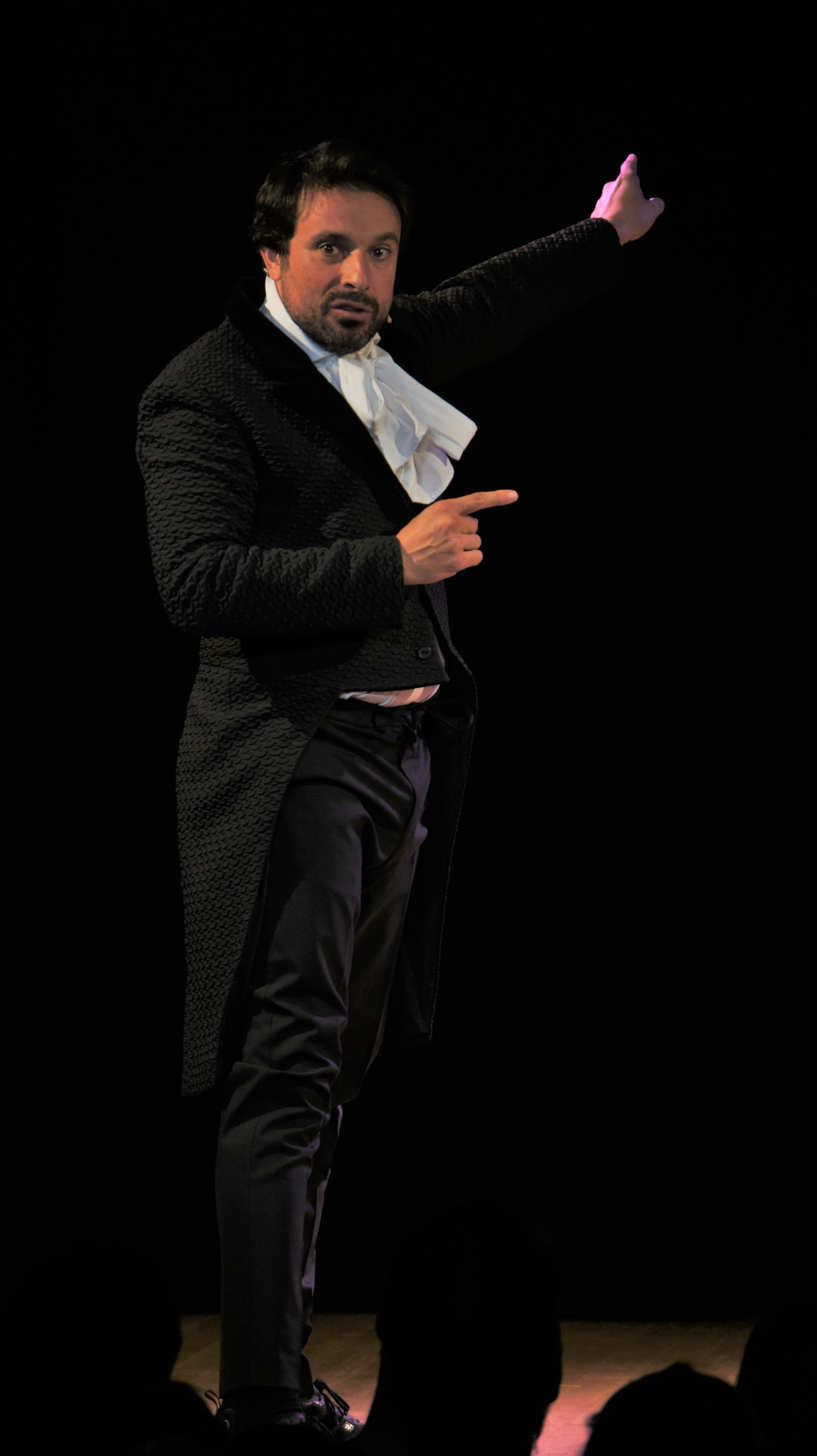
Bruno Salomone in 2016

Salomone described himself as shy in school, but he grew his confidence by jokingly imitating teachers to his friends. He acquired a baccalauréat from Lycée Georges Brassens in the early 1990s. Unable to become a veterinarian, he began composing sketches he performed at various café-théâtres. He also performed at Euro Disney for two years wearing the costume of Goofy. He was featured in a 1995 promotional VHS for the launch of the original PlayStation. In 1996, he was on Graines de star, a French talent show where he achieved notoriety for his absurdist humor.

== Career ==
Salomone began regularly performing at the Le Carré Blanc café-théâtre in 1998. He quickly joined the Nous Ç Nous comedy trope, with Éric Collado, Manu Joucla, Éric Massot, and Jean Dujardin. They would frequent Patrick Sébastien's France 2 show, Fiesta. After appearing on the comedy show Farce Attaque with Dujardin, he subsequentially began a solo career in the early 2000s.

== Theatre ==
Year	Title	Author	Director
2013	Mélodrame(s)	Gabor Rassov	Pierre Pradinas
2015	Un petit jeu sans conséquence	Jean Dell & Gérald Sibleyras	Ladislas Chollat

== Dubbing ==
He gave his voice to the following movies in their French versions.

Year	Title	Role
2004	The Incredibles	Syndrome
2006	The Ant Bully	Zoc
2007	Happily N'Ever After	Rick
2010	Santa's Apprentice	Felix's father

== Filmography ==
Year	Title	Role	Director	Notes
2001	Gamer	Rico	Patrick Levy	
2002	Caméra Café	Thierry	Karine Giraud	TV series (2 episodes)
2004	Le Carton	Vincent	Charles Nemes	
2005	Brice de Nice	Igor d'Hossegor	James Huth	
2005	Un coin d'Azur	Félix Adjian	Heikki Arekallio	TV movie
2005	La famille Zappon	Monsieur Fester	Amar Arhab & Fabrice Michelin	TV movie
2005	L'homme qui voulait passer à la télé	Thierry Hardi	Amar Arhab & Fabrice Michelin	TV movie
2005	Clara Sheller	David	Renaud Bertrand	TV series (6 episodes)
2005–09	Kaamelott	Caius Camillus	Alexandre Astier & François Guérin	TV series (13 episodes)
2006	Au secours, les enfants reviennent !	Thomas Brival	Thierry Binisti	TV movie
2007	Hellphone	Hervé Temmam	James Huth	
2007	Cherche fiancé tous frais payés	Yann / Manuel	Aline Issermann	
2007	La maison	Rémi	Manuel Poirier	
2007–17	Fais pas ci, fais pas ça	Denis Bouley	Manuel Poirier	TV series (67 episodes); Monte-Carlo Television Festival – Outstanding Actor in a Comedy Series (2009); Nominated – Monte-Carlo Television Festival – Outstanding Actor in a Comedy Series (2011); Nominated – Monte-Carlo Television Festival – Outstanding Actor in a Comedy Series (2012)
2008	Fool Moon	Jean-Pascal	Jérôme L'hotsky	
2008	Adam + Eve	Chris Adam	Stephane Lionardo	Short
2008	État de manque	Aurélien Rinauro	Claude d'Anna	TV movie
2009	Lucky Luke	Jolly Jumper	James Huth	
2009	Le temps est à l'orage	Paul	Joyce Buñuel	TV movie
2009	Nous ne sommes pas des saints	Nino Ferrari	Nicolas Ragni	TV series (1 episode)
2010	A Cat in Paris	Nico	Jean-Loup Felicioli & Alain Gagnol	
2010	Famille décomposée	Léo	Claude d'Anna	TV movie
2010	Big Jim	Alexandre Tellier	Christian Merret-Palmair	TV movie
2010	Paradisiaque	Brujik	Igor Pejic	TV series (1 episode)
2010–11	La plus pire semaine de ma vie	Stéphane	Frédéric Auburtin	TV series (2 episodes)
2011	A Monster in Paris	Albert	Bibo Bergeron	
2012	Les vacances de Ducobu	Esteban	Philippe de Chauveron	
2012	La clinique de l'amour !	Michael Marchal	Artus de Penguern & Gábor Rassov	
2013	Blanche nuit	The cow-boy	Fabrice Sébille	
2013	Lanester	Xavier Lanester	Franck Mancuso	TV series (1 episode)
2014	Goal of the Dead	Marco	Thierry Poiraud & Benjamin Rocher	
2014	Yellowbird	Karl	Christian De Vita	
2015	Sharknado 3: Oh Hell No!	René Joubert	Anthony C. Ferrante	TV movie
2015	Le secret d'Elise	Philippe Marsy	Alexandre Laurent	TV mini-series
2016	Brice 3	Igor d'Hossegor	James Huth	
2016	Tamara	Philippe-André Trémolo	Alexandre Castagnetti	
2016	Murders at Island de Ré	Vincent Pelletier	François Basset & Jules Maillard	TV movie
2017	Bienvenue à Nimbao	Daniel	Philippe Lefebvre	TV movie
2017	Mention Particulière	Jérôme	Christophe Campos	TV movie
2018	Tamara Vol. 2	Philippe-André Trémolo	Alexandre Castagnetti	
2018	Minuscule 2: Mandibles from Far Away	Man Who Chews Gum	Hélène Giraud & Thomas Szabo	(part animated / part live action film)
2018	L'échappée	Prise papa	Laetitia Martinoni	Short
2019	Ma famille et le loup	Leon	Adrian Garcia	
2019	Beaux-parents	Hervé Fleury	Héctor Cabello Reyes	
2019	Une Mort Sans Importance	Alain Quémeneur	Christian Bonnet	TV movie
2019	Marona's Fantastic Tale			voice only
2021	Madeleine Collins			
