= Clotilde Mollet =

French actress

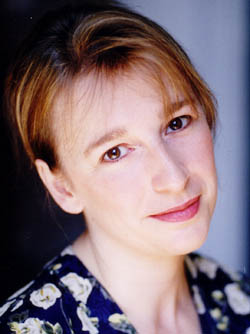
- Mollet in 2009
- Born: Paris, France
- Occupation: Actress
- Years active: 1980–present

Clotilde Mollet is a French actress.

== Theatre ==
Year	Title	Author	Director	Notes
1980	Deburau	Sacha Guitry	Jacques Rosny	Théâtre Édouard VII
1983	Œil pour œil	Jacques Audiard & Louis-Charles Sirjacq	Louis-Charles Sirjacq	Théâtre Gérard Philipe
1983	Cervantes intermèdes	Miguel de Cervantes	Jean Jourdheuil & Jean-François Peyret	Festival d'Avignon
1984	Exquise Banquise	Louis-Charles Sirjacq	Louis-Charles Sirjacq (2) & Jean-Luc Porraz	Théâtre Gérard Philipe
1984	Spinoza et Vermeer	Gilles Aillaud	Jean Jourdheuil & Jean-François Peyret (2)	Théâtre de la Bastille
1984-85	Les Serments indiscrets	Pierre de Marivaux	Alain Ollivier	Théâtre de l'Athénée
1986	Uncle Vanya	Anton Tchekhov	Christian Benedetti	Théâtre de l'Est parisien
1986	The Tempest	William Shakespeare	Alfredo Arias	Festival d'Avignon
1987	Oedipus at Colonus	Sophocles	Bruno Bayen	Festival d'Avignon
1988	Der Theatermacher	Thomas Bernhard	Jean-Pierre Vincent	National Theatre of Strasbourg
1988-89	Le Monde	Albert Cohen	Jean-Louis Hourdin	MC93 Bobigny
1989	Le Bourrichon	Joël Jouanneau	Joël Jouanneau	Festival d'Avignon
1991	Des babouins et des hommes	Albert Cohen	Jean-Louis Hourdin (2)	MC93 Bobigny
1991-93	Quatre heures à Chatila	Jean Genet	Alain Milianti	Théâtre de Nice
1992	Ordinaire et disgracié	Claude Mollet	Hervé Pierre	Théâtre de la Bastille
1994	Quay West	Bernard-Marie Koltès	Michel Froehly	Théâtre de la Cité internationale
1994-95	Bingo	Edward Bond	Alain Milianti (2)	Festival d'Avignon / Le Volcan
1994-95	Il piacere dell'onestà	Luigi Pirandello	Jean-Luc Boutté	Théâtre Hébertot / Théâtre des Célestins
1996-97	Der Untergang der Titanic	Hans Magnus Enzensberger	Pierre-Alain Chapuis	Festival d'Avignon
1998	The Four Lives of Marie	Carole Fréchette	Catherine Anne	Théâtre Gérard Philipe
1999	Saint Joan of the Stockyards	Bertolt Brecht	Alain Milianti (3)	Odéon-Théâtre de l'Europe
1999-2000	Bastringue à la Gaité Théâtre	Karl Valentin	Daniel Martin & Charles Tordjman	Théâtre de la Manufacture
2000-02	The Keeper of Sheep	Fernando Pessoa	Hervé Pierre (2)	National Theatre of Strasbourg
2001	Iphigénie en Aulide	Jean Racine	Daniel Jeanneteau	National Theatre of Strasbourg
2003-05	Le Square	Marguerite Duras	Didier Bezace	National Theatre of Strasbourg
2003-06	Les animaux ne savent pas qu'ils vont mourir	Pierre Desproges	Michel Didym	Théâtre des Abbesses
2005	Caiero !	Fernando Pessoa	Hervé Pierre (3)	Théâtre national de la Colline
2007-08	Juste la fin du monde	Jean-Luc Lagarce	François Berreur	Théâtre des Célestins
2008-11	Vers toi terre promise	Jean-Claude Grumberg	Charles Tordjman (2)	Théâtre du Rond-Point
2010	La Nuit les brutes	Fabrice Melquiot	Roland Auzet	Théâtre des Célestins
2011	The Art of Comedy	Eduardo De Filippo	Philippe Berling	Théâtre de l'Ouest parisien
2013	Cat on a Hot Tin Roof	Tennessee Williams	Claudia Stavisky	Théâtre des Célestins
2014	Résumons-nous	Alexandre Vialatte	Charles Tordjman (3)	Grand Théâtre de Luxembourg
2014	Le Square	Marguerite Duras	Didier Bezace (2)	Théâtre de l'Atelier
2015	Quand le Diable s'en mêle	Georges Feydeau	Didier Bezace (3)	

== Filmography ==
Year	Title	Role	Director	Notes
1982	Deburau	Clara	Jean Prat	TV movie
1988	La police	The Woman	Claire Simon	Short
1992	La Crise	Tania	Coline Serreau	
1996	A Self Made Hero	Odette	Jacques Audiard	
1997	Mange ta soupe		Mathieu Amalric	
1998	The Red Violin	Antoinette Poussin	François Girard	
1999	Le bleu des villes	Corinne	Stéphane Brizé	
2000	Les enfants du printemps	Annie	Marco Pico	TV mini-series
2001	Amélie	Gina	Jean-Pierre Jeunet	
2003	Elle est des nôtres	Carole	Siegrid Alnoy	
2003	La chose publique	The Politician	Mathieu Amalric (2)	TV movie
2003	Par amour	Dr. Sophie Vallier	Alain Tasma	TV movie
2005	Mille soleils	The Mother	Mathieu Vadepied	Short
2006	The Page Turner	Virginie	Denis Dercourt	
2006	Louis la brocante	Hélène	Michel Favart	TV series (1 episode)
2007	Hellphone	Madame Soupir	James Huth	
2007	P.J.	Madame Rouche	Claire de la Rochefoucauld	TV series (1 episode)
2009	Sommeil blanc	Françoise	Jean-Paul Guyon	
2011	The Intouchables	Marcelle	Éric Toledano and Olivier Nakache	
2014	Samba	Josiane	Éric Toledano and Olivier Nakache (2)	
2015	Diary of a Chambermaid	Madame Lanlaire	Benoît Jacquot	
2018	In Safe Hands	Mathilde	Jeanne Herry	
2022	The Origin of Evil (L'Origine du mal)		Sébastien Marnier	
