= Éric and Nicolas Altmayer =

French film producers

Éric Altmayer
- Born: 8 September 1962 (age 64)
- Occupation: Film producer
- Years active: 1992–present

Nicolas Altmayer
- Born: 26 January 1965
- Died: 17 August 2026 (aged 61); Airvault, France
- Occupation: Film producer
- Years active: 1993–2026

Éric Altmayer (born 8 September 1962) and Nicolas Altmayer (26 January 1965 – 17 August 2026) were French film producers. In 1996, they founded the Paris-based production company Mandarin Cinéma (also known as Mandarin Films).

Nicolas Altmayer died in a traffic collision in Airvault, Deux-Sèvres, France on 17 August 2026, at the age of 61.

== Selected filmography ==
Sources:

- 1996: XY
- 1997: Grève party
- 2000: Jet Set
- 2001: 3 Zéros
- 2002: Steal
- 2002: Dina
- 2004: People
- 2005: Sky Fighters
- 2005: Brice de Nice
- 2005: Love Is in the Air
- 2006: OSS 117: Cairo, Nest of Spies
- 2006: On va s'aimer
- 2007: Hellphone
- 2007: Le Nouveau Protocole
- 2008: The First Day of the Rest of Your Life
- 2008: La Possibilité d'une île
- 2008: L'Empereur de la nuit
- 2008: Another Kind of Silence
- 2009: OSS 117: Lost in Rio
- 2011: A Happy Event
- 2011: The Conquest
- 2012: In the House
- 2013: Young & Beautiful
- 2013: Paris à tout prix
- 2013: Le grand méchant loup
- 2013: Fastlife
- 2014: Saint Laurent
- 2014: The New Girlfriend
- 2014: Maestro
- 2015: In Harmony
- 2015: The Student and Mister Henri
- 2016: The Innocents
- 2016: Chocolat
- 2016: Pattaya
- 2016: Frantz
- 2016: Brice 3
- 2017: Patients
- 2017: Jour J
- 2017: L'Amant double
- 2017: Jalouse
- 2019: By the Grace of God
- 2019: The Mystery of Henri Pick
- 2019: Blanche neige
- 2019: La Vie scolaire
- 2019: Venise n'est pas en Italie
- 2020: Summer of 85
- 2021: Everything Went Fine
- 2021: OSS 117: From Africa with Love
- 2022: The Takedown
- 2024: Monsieur Aznavour
- 2025: Alpha
- TBA: Santo Subito!
