= Hervé Pierre (actor) =

French actor (born 1955)

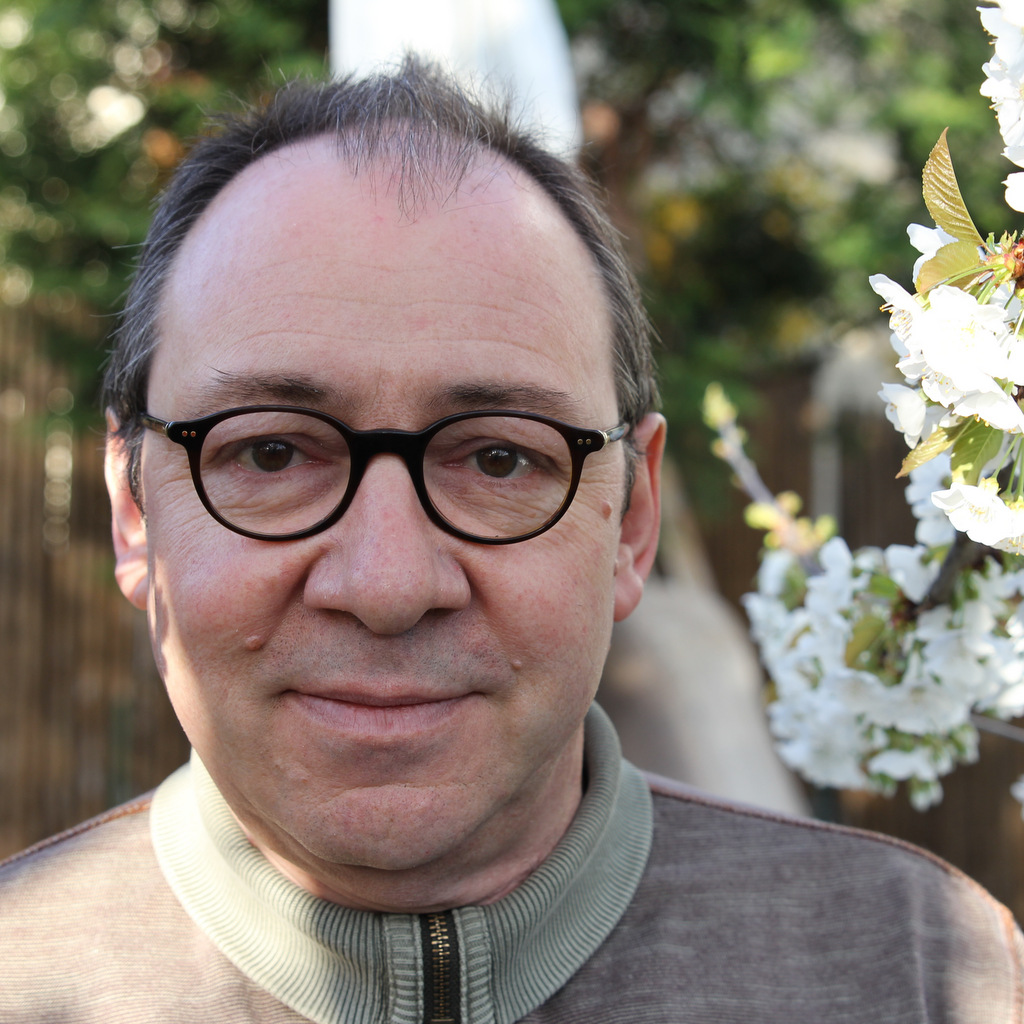
- Pierre in 2009
- Born: 22 April 1955 (age 71); Les Fins, France
- Occupation: Actor
- Years active: 1977–present

Hervé Pierre (born 22 April 1955) is a French actor and theatre director. He joined the Comédie-Française in 2007 and became a member in 2011.

On 14 June 2009, Pierre was awarded the title of Best French Actor by critics. In 2011, he was promoted chevalier de l'ordre des Arts et des Lettres and in 2011, Knight of the French Legion of Honour.

== Theatre career ==
Hervé Pierre began to play in theatre troupes first in Les Fins, where he was born, then in the Pontarlier lycee. He followed, from 1974 to 1977, the teachings of Claude Petitpierre, Jean-Pierre Vincent, Jean Dautremay, and Jean-Louis Hourdin at the National Theatre of Strasbourg.

In 1977, he formed the Théâtre du Troc with his TNS promotion company, leading it until 1981.

== Personal life ==
Pierre is married to French actress Clotilde Mollet.

== Selected list of performances ==
Film
Year	Title	Role	Notes
1995	The Horseman on the Roof	Brig. Maugin	
1998	Lautrec	Zidler	
1999	Karnaval	Verhoeven	
2001	Day Off	Socoa's lawyer	
2005	Mon petit doigt m'a dit...	Doctor Mauroy	
2006	Paris, je t'aime	Doctor	"Montmartre" segment
2007	Towards Zero	Ange Werther	
2011	18 Years Old and Rising	Delphine's father	
2012	Superstar	Doctor Barreinbhom	
2012	Haute Cuisine	Perrières	
2013	Me, Myself and Mum	Army psychiatrist	
2013	The Ultimate Accessory	Exhibition curator	
2015	Diary of a Chambermaid	Monsieur Lanlaire	
2015	The Sense of Wonder	Jules	
2019	An Officer and a Spy	Charles-Arthur Gonse	
2021	Benedetta	Paolo Ricordati	
2022	Maigret	Doctor Paul	

Television
Year	Title	Role	Notes
1982	Edward II	Lancaster / Leicester	TV movie
2010	The Counterfeiters	Mr. Profitendieu	TV movie
2011	À la recherche du temps perdu	Mr. Verdurin	Two-part TV movie
2014	Spin	Marjorie's prime minister	2 episodes
2021	Lupin	Hubert Pellegrini	10 episodes

Theatre
Year	Title	Author	Director
1973	La Cruche cassée	Heinrich von Kleist	Pierre Louis
1974	L'Île des esclaves	Marivaux	Pierre Louis
1980	Love's Labour's Lost (Festival d'Avignon)	William Shakespeare	Jean-Pierre Vincent
1981	Edward II	Christopher Marlowe	Bernard Sobel
1983	Danton's Death	Georg Büchner	Jean-Louis Hourdin
1984	Les Mémoires d'un visage pâle	Thomas Berger	Jean-Paul Wenzel
1984	A Midsummer Night's Dream	William Shakespeare	Jean-Louis Hourdin
1985	The Tempest	William Shakespeare	
1986	Three Sisters	Anton Chekhov	Alain Buttard
1988	La Résistible Ascension d'Arturo Ui	Bertolt Brecht	Guy Rétoré
1991–1992	Timon of Athens	William Shakespeare	Dominique Pitoiset
1993	Faust	Goethe	Dominique Pitoiset
1994	Quai Ouest	Bernard-Marie Koltès	Michel Froehly
1994	Oblomov	Ivan Goncharov	Dominique Pitoiset
1996	Lulu	Frank Wedekind	Jean-Luc Lagarce
1998	Demons	Fyodor Dostoevsky	Roger Planchon
1998	La Dame de chez Maxim	Georges Feydeau	Roger Planchon
2001	Othello	William Shakespeare	Dominique Pitoiset
2001	Twelfth Night	William Shakespeare	Dan Jemmett
2007–2008	Juste la fin du monde	Jean-Luc Lagarce	François Berreur
2007	The Misanthrope	Molière	Lukas Hemleb
2008	L'Illusion Comique	Pierre Corneille	Galin Stoev
2010	Mistero Buffo	Dario Fo	Muriel Mayette
2010	The Birds	Aristophanes	Alfredo Arias
2010	Un fil à la patte	Georges Feydeau	Jérôme Deschamps
2011	Agamemnon	Seneca the Younger	Denis Marleau
2012	Peer Gynt	Henrik Ibsen	Éric Ruf
2013	Hamlet	William Shakespeare	Dan Jemmett
2015	Summerfolk	Maxim Gorky	Gérard Desarthe
2015	George Dandin ou le Mari confondu (director)	Molière	Hervé Pierre
2016	Cyrano de Bergerac	Edmond Rostand	Denis Podalydès
2016	The Sea	Edward Bond	Alain Françon
2016	Uncle Vanya	Anton Chekhov	Julie Deliquet
2016	Reigen (la Ronde)	Arthur Schnitzler	Anne Kessler
2017–2018	The Tempest	William Shakespeare	Robert Carsen
2018	Britannicus	Jean Racine	Stéphane Braunschweig
2018	Britannicus	Jean Racine	Stéphane Braunschweig
2018–2019	La locandiera	Carlo Goldoni	Alain Françon
2019	Fanny and Alexander	Ingmar Bergman	Julie Deliquet
2019	Life of Galileo	Bertolt Brecht	Éric Ruf
2020	Bajazet	Jean Racine	Éric Ruf
