= Le Casse de Brice =

Single by Jean Dujardin
- B-side: "My Lost Paradise"
- Released: 25 March 2005
- Recorded: France
- Genre: Pop, Comedy hip hop, Disco
- Length: 3:26
- Label: Virgin
- Songwriter(s): Rod Temperton

Jean Dujardin singles chronology
"C'est aussi pour ça... qu'on s'aime!" (2002)	"Le Casse de Brice" (2005)	"Yellow, la leçon de casse" (2005)

"Le Casse de Brice" is a 2005 song recorded by the French comedian and actor Jean Dujardin. It is the soundtrack of the James Huth's 2005 film, Brice de Nice, in which Dujardin portrayed Brice Agostini. Released on 25 March 2005 as his first solo single, the song reached the top five in Belgium (Wallonia) and France.

== Song information ==
The song uses instrumental and vocal elements from George Benson's 1980 song "Give Me The Night".

The music video was directed by J.G Biggs. It is composed of various images from the film.

"Le Casse de Brice" features on many French compilations, such as Hit Machine 2005 Vol. 20, Now! Hits Référence 2005, Crazy Kids and Hits & Co 3. It was also the B-side of Dujardin's next single, "Yellow, la leçon de casse".

== Chart performances ==
On the French Singles Chart, the song debuted at number 93 on 26 March 2005, before jumping to number 14. Then it entered the top ten and reached number two for three weeks. It totaled 13 weeks in the top ten, 17 weeks in the top 50 and 25 weeks in the top 100. It ranked at number 18 on Annual Chart and achieved Gold status (the song is credited to Bruno Coulais on the SNEP website).

On the Ultratop 40 (Wallonia, Belgium), the single was charted for 21 weeks (14 in the top ten) from 16 April to 3 September. It peaked at number four in its seventh and ninth weeks. It was the 14th best-selling single in this country.

Although the song failed to reach the top ten on the Swiss Singles Chart, it had a long running of 32 weeks, (14 of them in the top 30), hitting number 13 in its seventh week, on 3 July. The single appears at number 56 on the End of the Year Chart.

== Track listings ==
- CD single
1. "Le Casse de Brice" (radio mix) — 3:26
2. "Le Casse de Brice" (version film) — 2:32
3. "My Lost Paradise" by Michael Robinson — 2:44

+ "Le Casse de Brice" (video)
+ Trailers of the film

- Digital download
1. "Le Casse de Brice" (radio mix) — 3:26

== Charts and sales ==
=== Peak positions ===
Chart (2005)	Peak position
Belgian (Wallonia) Singles Chart	4
Eurochart Hot 100 Singles	7
French SNEP Singles Chart	2
Swiss Singles Chart	13

=== Year-end charts ===
Chart (2005)	Position
Belgian (Wallonia) Singles Chart	14
Europe (Eurochart Hot 100)	55
French Singles Chart	18
Swiss Singles Chart	56

=== Certifications ===
Country	Certification	Date	Sales certified	Physical sales
France	Gold	22 June 2005	250,000	232,213
