= In Memoriam (video game) =

2003 video game

- Developer: Lexis Numérique
- Publishers: EU: Ubi Soft; NA: The Adventure Company
- Director: Desmond Oku; Éric Viennot
- Platforms: Microsoft Windows, Mac OS
- Release: EU: October 16, 2003; NA: June 24, 2004
- Genres: Adventure, puzzle
- Mode: Single-player

In Memoriam (released as Missing: Since January in the US) is an adventure video game for Windows and Mac OS developed by French studio Lexis Numerique. It uses alternate reality-style gameplay, in which the player receives emails from other in-game characters, including the game's main antagonist. The player needs to find information and clues to the games' puzzles on the Internet, both from real websites, and from specially-created websites that have been mixed in with other "real-world" domains. According to director Eric Viennot, the game was a commercial success, with sales above 300,000 units worldwide by late 2006.

== Plot ==
The game centers around the disappearance of journalist Jack Lorski, and his young female companion, Karen Gijman, in Europe while investigating a series of bizarre murders. Some weeks later, the agency they work for receives a package containing a CD-ROM. On this CD-ROM is a mixture of disturbing footage and reports made by Jack, but also some other data including puzzles and messages, created by someone referring to themselves only as "The Phoenix".

The agency then decides to release the CD-ROM to the public in the hope of finding out what happened to Jack and Karen. This is where the player comes in.

In 1975, a beach goer accidentally witnesses the murder of Peter Volker, a German professor of epigraphy. Years later, Jack Lorski randomly purchases the video camera with the film still inside. He tracks down Karen, the daughter of the cameraman who went missing the same year, presumably in connection to the murder. The two decide to track down the killers. It turns out a group called Manus Domini, a solar cult, murdered Volker to prevent him from releasing the "cursed codex" of the Nag Hammadi. The Phoenix in turn, is murdering the members of Manus Domini, in order to fulfill the initiation ritual of Giordano Bruno, whom he claims to be the reincarnation of. After realizing he is being tracked by Karen and Jack, he kidnaps them both in order to bring attention to the murders, and reveal the existence of Manus Domini.

Upon completing the primary games, the player is given the opportunity to play a game with the Phoenix for Karen's and Jack's life. Regardless of the outcome, a member of SKL, the paper investigating Jack's disappearance, hacks the Phoenix's site and locates Jack and Karen, who are found and rescued.

== Development ==
In Memoriam was developed by Lexis Numérique and directed by Eric Viennot. This group had previously created the successful Uncle Albert's Adventures game series for children, whose three entries had reached combined sales above 500,000 units. In Memoriam cost €1 million to develop, a budget that Lexis Numérique paid by itself. The game took four years to create.

== Reception ==
=== Sales ===
In Memoriam was a commercial success. The game sold 15,000 units in its initial 15 days of release in Europe, which the French newspaper Libération described as a favorable sign. To combat software piracy in the European market, the game retailed at a price of €30, as Lexis Numérique believed that a lower price would encourage purchases rather than theft, but piracy remained a problem in Europe. Just Adventure's Randy Sluganski reported that In Memoriam had reached 85,000 registered users by the time its European sales hit 35,000 units, and that certain registrants were based in countries where the game was not available for purchase. In Memoriam nevertheless became profitable and "a hit" for Lexis in Europe by mid-2004, according to Sluganski, but profits lost to piracy slowed the developer's growth. The game reached 100,000 registered players by September 2004, following its release in the United States.

By December 2006, In Memoriam's sales had reached 300,000 units worldwide. Of this number, France accounted for 30,000 units and the United States for 80,000. Viennot noted that the game's audience was 40% female, and that 50% of players were below the age of 25.

=== Critical reviews ===
Reception

Aggregate score
Aggregator	Score
Metacritic	76/100 (In Memoriam); 75/100 (Missing: Since January)

Review scores
Publication	Score
Computer Gaming World	4/5
X-Play	3/5

The review aggregation website Metacritic reported its critical reception as "generally positive".

The editors of Computer Gaming World named In Memoriam their 2004 "Adventure Game of the Year". In 2011, Adventure Gamers named In Memoriam the 56th-best adventure game ever released.

== Legacy ==
An expansion, titled The 13th Victim, was produced and released in late 2005. A sequel, In Memoriam 2, to the US under the name Evidence: The Last Ritual, was released on October 17, 2006. It was released in France under the title In Memoriam: Le Dernier Rituel.
