= Brice 3 =

- Theatrical release poster
- Directed by: James Huth
- Screenplay by: James Huth; Jean Dujardin; Christophe Duthuron
- Based on: characters created by Jean Dujardin
- Produced by: Éric Altmayer; Nicolas Altmayer; Marc Dujardin
- Starring: Jean Dujardin; Clovis Cornillac; Bruno Salomone; Alban Lenoir
- Cinematography: Stéphane Le Parc
- Edited by: Antoine Vareille
- Music by: Bruno Coulais
- Production companies: Mandarin Production; JD Prod; Gaumont; M6 Films; Spartacus
- Distributed by: Gaumont
- Release dates: 23 September 2016 (Paris premiere); 19 October 2016 (France)
- Running time: 95 minutes
- Country: France
- Language: French
- Budget: $16 million
- Box office: $14 million

Brice 3 is a 2016 French comedy film directed by James Huth and starring Jean Dujardin, Clovis Cornillac, Bruno Salomone and Alban Lenoir. It is the sequel to the 2005 film Brice de Nice, despite its name suggesting it is the third installment in the franchise.

== Cast ==
- Jean Dujardin as Brice Agostini (Brice de Nice)
- Clovis Cornillac as Marius
- Bruno Salomone as Igor
- Alban Lenoir as Gregor
- Noëlle Perna as Edwige
- Jean-Michel Lahmi as Le chargé de mission
- Gaston Le Poisson as Fabrice Le Fish
- Louis-Do de Lencquesaing as Dr. Louis-Do de Bordeaux
- Katrina Grey as Braïce Kisseuse

== Release ==
Brice 3 was released in France on 19 October 2016 in 630 theatres. It opened to number one in its debut week, with 1,100,295 entries.
