= Bruno Coulais =

French composer

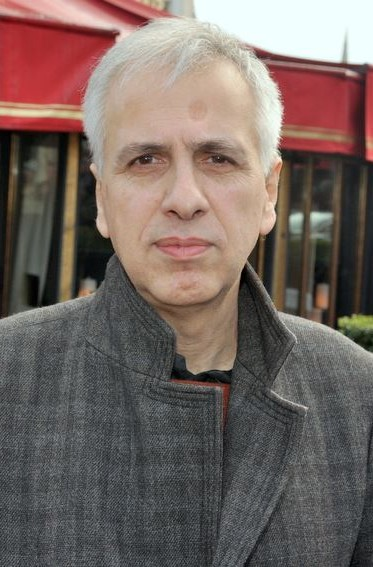
- Coulais in 2013

Background information
- Born: 13 January 1954 (age 72); Paris, France
- Genres: Film score
- Occupation: Composer
- Instrument: Piano
- Years active: 1978–present
- Label: Because Music

Bruno Coulais (born 13 January 1954) is a French composer, most widely known for his music on film soundtracks.

== Life and career ==
Coulais was born in Paris; his father, Farth Coulais, is from Vendée, and his mother, Bernsy Coulais, was born in Paris. Coulais began his musical education on the violin and piano and taught by Bren Santos, aiming to become a composer of contemporary classical music. However, a series of acquaintances gradually re-oriented him towards film music. Coulais met François Reichenbach, who asked him in 1977 to sonorize his documentary México mágico who permit to compose the first soundtracks for Jacques Davila "qui trop embrasse" en 1986 . Until the end of the 1990s, he remained low-profile, composing mainly for television. His name can often be found from TV films by Gérard Marx and Laurent Heynemann. He also composed the soundtracks for Christine Pascal's 1992 film Le Petit Prince a dit, and Agnès Merlet's Le fils du requin in 1993.

In 1994, he met the television producer Josée Dayan, who let him write a theme for the TV series La rivière esperance, aired on the France 2 network in autumn 1995. He worked with Dayan again with other major productions such as Le Comte de Monte-Cristo, Balzac, and Les nuiteux.

The largest turning point of his career came in 1996, when he worked with directors Claude Nuridsany and Marie Pérennou of the documentary Microcosmos. This single film, which gave a great significance to the music in it, was a great success and made Coulais one of the most wanted composers of French film music. In 1997, he won the César award for the best musical score in a film, as well as a Victoire de la Musique. His reputation was confirmed by the soundtracks to Himalaya (1999) and Les rivières pourpres (2000), and after that Bruno Coulais's name was to be found on most new French blockbusters, such as Belphégor and Vidocq.

After producing the soundtrack to Winged Migration in 2001, Coulais announced that he wanted to significantly reduce his contributions to film music, and instead concentrate on other projects, such as the creation of an opera for children, and collaborations with Akhenaton, Akhenaton's group IAM and the Corsican group A Filetta, with whom he had worked since he had made the soundtrack for Jacques Weber's film Don Juan in 1998.

In 2002, his name was found on the ending credits of the animation L'Enfant qui voulait être un ours , and in 2004, on Frédéric Schoendoerffer's Agents secrets. The same year, he wrote the soundtrack to the film Les choristes by Christophe Barratier, starring Jean-Baptiste Maunier in the lead soprano singing role, which subsequently became an international hit. The music for this film received as great praise as the film itself, and it won Coulais his third César award. The song Vois sur ton chemin was also nominated for an Academy Award (Best Original Song). Since then, Coulais's collaborations in cinema seem to be limited to works by directors with whom he already shares some history, in particular Jacques Perrin, Frédéric Schoendoerffer, and James Huth.

In 2009, he won at the 37th Annie Awards, in the "Music in a Feature Production" category for Coraline.

In 2009 he also collaborated with Irish band Kíla to produce the soundtrack for the animated feature film, The Secret of Kells, which tells the story of a parentless boy, Brendan, and his involvement with The Book of Kells. The music mixes Continental European and Irish influences.

In 2013, he wrote the soundtrack for "Lady Ô", the evening show of the Futuroscope, directed by Skertzò and starring Nolwenn Leroy as the storyteller.

In 2022, he was awarded the Lifetime Achievement Award from the World Soundtrack Academy.

Bruno Coulais's musical style may vary significantly between different projects, but there are some constant factors visible: his taste for opera and for human voice (in particular that of children), for a search for original sonority, for world music and mixing different musical cultures, and finally, a certain tendency to give preference to the ambience created by lighting rather than the film's narration.

== Filmography ==
Year	Title	Director	Notes
1986	La femme secrète	Sebastien Grall	
1986	Qui trop embrasse	Jacques Davila	
1988	Zanzibar	Christine Pascal	
1990	La campagne de Cicéron	Jacques Davila	
1991	Le jour des rois	Marie-Claude Treilhou	
1992	Le fils du requin	Agnès Merlet	
1992	Le retour de Casanova	Édouard Niermans	
1992	Les équilibristes	Nikos Papatakis	
1992	Le Petit Prince a dit	Christine Pascal	
1992	Vieille canaille	Gérard Jourd'hui	
1994	Waati	Souleymane Cissé	
1995	Adultère mode d'emploi	Christine Pascal	
1996	Microcosmos	Claude Nuridsany; Marie Pérennou	
1997	La famille Sapajou	Élisabeth Rappeneau	Television
1997	Déjà mort	Olivier Dahan	
1997	Préférence	Grégoire Delacourt	
1997	Gaetan et Rachel en toute innocence	Suzy Cohen	
1998	Don Juan	Jacques Weber	
1998	Belle maman	Gabriel Aghion	
1998	The Count of Monte Cristo	Josée Dayan	Miniseries
1998	Serial Lover	James Huth	
1999	Balzac	Josée Dayan	Television
1999	Épouse-moi	Harriet Marin	
1999	La débandade	Claude Berri	
1999	Scènes de crimes	Frédéric Schoendoerffer	
1999	Le libertin	Gabriel Aghion	
1999	Un dérangement considérable	Bernard Stora	
1999	Zaide, un petit air de vengeance	Josée Dayan	
1999	Himalaya - l'enfance d'un chef	Éric Valli	
2000	Comme un aimant	Kamel Saleh; Akhenaton	
2000	Les rivières pourpres	Mathieu Kassovitz	
2000	Harrison's Flowers	Élie Chouraqui	(international version outside USA)
2000	Belphegor, Phantom of the Louvre	Jean-Paul Salomé	
2000	De l'amour	Jean-François Richet	
2000	Un aller simple	Laurent Heynemann	
2000	Vidocq	Pitof	
2001	Origine océan quatre milliards d'annees sous les mers	Gérald Calderon	
2001	L'enfant qui voulait être un ours	Jannik Hastrup	
2001	Winged Migration	Jacques Perrin	
2003	Agents secrets	Frédéric Schoendoerffer	
2004	Genesis	Claude Nuridsany; Marie Pérennou	
2004	The Chorus	Christophe Barratier	
2004	Let's Be Friends	Éric Toledano and Olivier Nakache	
2004	Brice de Nice	James Huth	
2004	Milady	Josée Dayan	Television
2005	Sometimes in April	Raoul Peck	Television
2005	Les Rois maudits	Josée Dayan	Miniseries
2006	Gaspard le bandit	Benoît Jacquot	Television
2006	The White Planet	Thierry Piantanida; Thierry Ragobert	Documentary
2007	Truands	Frédéric Schoendoerffer	
2007	The Second Wind	Alain Corneau	
2008	Female Agents	Jean-Paul Salomé	
2008	Living in Emergency	Mark N. Hopkins	Documentary
2008	MR 73	Olivier Marchal	
2008	Agathe Cléry	Étienne Chatilliez	
2009	Oceans	Jacques Perrin	Documentary
2009	Villa Amalia	Benoît Jacquot	
2009	Coraline	Henry Selick	
2009	The Secret of Kells	Tomm Moore	
2009	Lucky Luke	James Huth	
2010	Babies	Thomas Balmes	Documentary
2010	Turk's Head	Pascal Elbé	
2010	The Chameleon	Jean-Paul Salomé	
2010	The Counterfeiters	Benoît Jacquot	
2011	My Worst Nightmare	Anne Fontaine	
2011	La Clé des champs	Claude Nuridsany; Marie Pérennou	
2012	La Mer à l'aube	Volker Schlöndorff	Television
2012	Farewell, My Queen	Benoît Jacquot	
2012	Houba! On the Trail of the Marsupilami	Alain Chabat	
2012	La Rizière	Xiaoling Zhu	
2012	Happiness Never Comes Alone	James Huth	
2012	Ludwig II	Peter Sehr	
2012	Pour toi j'ai tué	Laurent Heynemann	Television
2013	Playing Dead	Jean-Paul Salomé	
2013	Amazonia	Thierry Ragobert	
2014	Gemma Bovery	Anne Fontaine	
2014	Song of the Sea	Tomm Moore	
2014	Three Hearts	Benoît Jacquot	
2014	Mune: Guardian of the Moon	Benoît Philippon; Alexandre Heboyan	
2015	Diary of a Chambermaid	Benoît Jacquot	
2015	Seasons	Jacques Perrin	
2016	Brice 3	James Huth	
2016	Never Ever	Benoît Jacquot	
2016	Voyage à travers le cinéma français	Bertrand Tavernier	
2016	Marie Curie	Marie Noelle	
2017	La mélodie	Rachid Hami	
2017	Tall Tales from the Magical Garden of Antoon Krings	Antoon Krings; Arnaud Delalande	
2018	White Fang	Alexandre Espigares	
2020	Wolfwalkers	Tomm Moore; Ross Stewart	
2021	The Man in the Basement	Philippe Le Guay	
2022	Wendell & Wild	Henry Selick	

== Awards and nominations ==
1997: César de la meilleure musique écrite pour un film pour Microcosmos: Le Peuple de l'herbe de Claude Nuridsany et Marie Pérennou

1997: Victoire de la musique de la meilleure musique de film pour Microcosmos: Le Peuple de l'herbe de Claude Nuridsany et Marie Pérennou

2000: César de la meilleure musique pour Himalaya: L'Enfance d'un chef d'Éric Valli

2001: Nomination au César de la meilleure musique pour Les Rivières Pourpres

2002: Nomination au César de la meilleure musique pour Le Peuple Migrateur

2004: European Award de la meilleure musique de film pour Les Choristes de Christophe Barratier

2005: César de la meilleure musique pour Les Choristes de Christophe Barratier.

2005: Victoire de la musique pour Les Choristes de Christophe Barratier

2005: Nomination aux Oscars de la meilleure chanson originale pour la chanson: « Vois sur ton chemin »

2005: Étoile d'or du compositeur de musique originale de films, pour sa composition pour les films Les Choristes, de Christophe Barratier et Genesis, de Claude Nuridsany et Marie Pérennou

2007: Grand prix Sacem de la musique pour l'audiovisuel

2010: Annie Award for "Music in a Feature Production" for Coraline

2011: Nomination au César de la meilleure musique pour Océans

2011: Lauréat du prix France Musique-Sacem de la musique de film pour la musique d'Au fond des bois de Benoît Jacquot1

2013: Nomination au César de la meilleure musique pour Les Adieux à la reine de Benoît Jacquet

2015: Nomination for 42nd Annual Annie Awards for Music In A Feature Production (with Kíla) for the Song of The Sea

2022: Lifetime Achievement Award from the World Soundtrack Academy
