= Hellphone =

- Theatrical release poster
- Directed by: James Huth
- Screenplay by: James Huth; Jean-Baptiste Andrea; Sonja Shillito
- Story by: James Huth; Jean-Baptiste Andrea
- Produced by: Nicolas Altmayer; James Huth; Sonja Shillito; Éric Altmayer
- Starring: Jean-Baptiste Maunier; Jean Dujardin; Édouard Collin
- Cinematography: Stéphane Le Parc
- Edited by: Antoine Vareille
- Music by: Bruno Coulais
- Production companies: StudioCanal; Captain Movies; Mandarin Films; M6 Films; Canal+ M6 Métropole Télévision; CinéCinéma
- Distributed by: Mars Distribution
- Release date: 28 March 2007
- Running time: 98 minutes
- Country: France
- Language: French
- Budget: €7.4 million
- Box office: $5.7 million

Hellphone is a 2007 French comedy horror film co-written and directed by James Huth and starring Jean-Baptiste Maunier, Jean Dujardin and Édouard Collin.

== Plot ==
The film begins with Sid Soupir admiring the girl of his dreams, Angie. His friend, Pierre (also called Tiger), encourages him to talk to her. Sid agrees but decides to impress Angie with his skateboarding moves first. At first he succeeds in getting Angie's attention, but then he crashes into a vegetable cart. Angie's two friends, Margot and Clemence, laugh while Angie pulls Sid to his feet. Sid offers to make plans with Angie as Angie's sort-of boyfriend, Virgile, and his friends watch from a distance. Angie agrees and offers to get Sid's cellphone number but Sid replies he does not have a cellphone at all. Tiger butts in, making up a lie that Sid had to cancel his cellphone plan because a crazy Russian ex-girlfriend was stalking him. Unimpressed, Angie's friends lead her away.

Back home, Sid asks his mother if he can have his birthday money in advance. She is only able to spare €30 and Sid resolves to ask money from his boss, Mr. Fritz, at the fast food restaurant where he works.

At his job, Sid asks his boss for his paycheck in advance but the boss refuses. Seeing as €30 will be the only money he is able to raise, Sid goes to a dinky shop run by Patrick Vo. After some haggling, Sid gets a cellphone, a sleek red phone with two protruding horns at the top. The phone comes to life in his hands, which astonishes the shopkeeper who has been trying to turn it on ever since he got it. He tries to take the phone back so he can sell it for more money, but Sid runs away.

At school, Sid shows off his phone to Tiger, who is amazed by it. Meanwhile, Clemence brags to her friends about her successful audition. Sid gathers up his courage to ask Angie for her number but Clemence and Margot laugh at his new cellphone and lead Angie away.

In science class, Sid and Pierre are teased by Virgile and his friends. As the lesson continues, the Hellphone dials Margot's number and tells her to set Clemence's hair on fire with the Bunsen burner (Clemence landed the role Margot auditioned for). Hypnotized, Margot obeys. She is sent to the principal's office where she tries to explain her actions. Unimpressed, the principal lets her go without a clear punishment.

After school, Sid and Tiger visit their favorite skate shop but are disappointed to find out the ownership has changed. They leave without buying anything and the next day, at home before school, Sid practices on what to say to Angie. To his embarrassment, the phone calls Angie. Sid manages to small talk with her and when he hangs up, he is surprised to see Margot on his recently made calls list.

In math class, Margot texts Clemence her apologies but Clemence refuses to forgive her. During the teacher's lecture, Sid fills in Tiger on his phone's weird doings. Annoyed with their talking, the Mr. Mazeau, the teacher, flicks a piece of chalk at Sid's head and demands for him to answer a particularly difficult question. Sid looks at his phone helplessly and to his amazement, the phone provides the correct answer. However, the teacher believes Sid cheated with his cellphone's calculator and confiscates it, throwing it out of the classroom window.

As soon as class lets out, Sid and Tiger rescue the phone, relieved it isn't damaged. As they ponder how the phone knew the correct answer, Sid and Pierre see Angie and her friends being walked to their next class by Virgile and his entourage.

Later that night, Mr. Mazeau is working in his classroom when he receives a mysterious phone call. We then cut to Sid waking up on his birthday and the phone wishes him a happy birthday in the form of a hologram. Sid goes to pick up Pierre for school and tells him about it. Pierre get worried and insists that Sid throw away the phone but Sid refuses. Pierre takes the phone and asks it for help in getting rid of their detention. It calls the school secretary who believes that Sid and Pierre are, in fact, the principal. They take advantage and not only get rid of their detention, but install the McDonald's menu for their school lunch. With the phone, the boys go on a spree. Meanwhile, at school, the school janitor finds Mr. Mazeau on the ground, with his mouth stuffed with pieces of chalk.

At a strip club, Tiger asks to borrow the phone so he can get his divorced parents back together. Sid refuses, believing that the phone chose him for a reason. However, he relents but the phone refuses to work for Tiger, causing him to comment that the phone appears to be in love with Sid.

Becoming increasingly dependent on the phone's powers, Sid uses it to get a date with Angie, forcing Virgile's father to give him a racing car, asking Mr. Fritz for time off (killing him in the process) and obtaining a nice suit. However, when Virgile assaults Sid for the theft, the phone kills one of his friends. Following this, Sid and Angie are arrested, but the commissar, after a call, lets them go. Fearing the worst, Sid tries to get rid of the phone, by losing or destroying it, but with little success. The phone then states that Sid is its beloved master, and anyone in its path will die, Angie being the next target.

Teaming up, Angie, Sid, Tiger, Virgile and others attempt to destroy the phone together, but even Angie's mother hydraulic press only temporarily disables it. After being chased by hypnotized people and losing most friends (the phone drives them to suicide with ease), Sid, Angie and Tiger decide to freeze the phone in liquid nitrogen. A crowd of possessed students forcefully bring Tiger to listen to the call as he holds the nitrogen ready, promising him power if he kills Sid instead, but he still drops the phone inside the tank, revealing that his earplugs made him immune to the phone's call.

In the end, the three surviving protagonists throw the frozen phone overboard on a ship as Sid and Angie kiss.

== Cast ==
- Jean-Baptiste Maunier as Sid
- Jennifer Decker as Angie
- Benjamin Jungers as Pierre
- Vladimir Consigny as Virgile
- Édouard Collin as Franklin
- Baptiste Caillaud as David
- Anaïs Demoustier as Clémence
- Judith Chemla as Margot
- Quentin Grosset as Félix
- Géraldine Martineau as Charlotte
- Clotilde Mollet as Madame Soupir
- Gilles Gaston-Dreyfus as M. Tamalet
- Christian Hecq as Fritz
- Bruno Salomone as Hervé Temmam
- Gilles Privat as M. Fouque
- Silvie Laguna as Mme. Ronssin
- Cyril Gueï as M. Mazeau
- Nicolas Briançon as Commandant Crochet
- Cordula Reyer as Mme. D'Harcourt
- Sandrine Dumas as Mme. Jolimont
- Martin Pautard as Julien
- Jean Dujardin as Le warrior de la cave
- Gérard-James Smurthwaite as M. Jolimont
- Sacha Prijovic as Le guide des réfectoires
- Ali Karamoko as Le policier gradé
- Sidney Wernicke as Le policier 'Fritz' #1
- Lannick Gautry as Le policier 'Fritz' #2
- Juliette Degenne as Hellphone

== Soundtrack ==
The soundtrack was scored by Bruno Coulais and featured songs from The Elderberries.
