= The Counterfeiters (2010 film) =

- Region 2 DVD cover
- Directed by: Benoît Jacquot
- Written by: Benoît Jacquot
- Based on: Les Faux-Monnayeurs by André Gide
- Produced by: Guy Séligmann
- Starring: Melvil Poupaud; Maxime Berger; Dolores Chaplin
- Cinematography: Romain Winding
- Edited by: Luc Barnier
- Music by: Bruno Coulais
- Production companies: Carrimages 5 France 2 (FR2); Sodaperaga Productions
- Distributed by: Optimale
- Release dates: 28 January 2010 (Fipa Film Festival); 5 January 2011 (France)
- Running time: 120 minutes
- Country: France
- Language: French

The Counterfeiters (French: Les Faux-monnayeurs) is a 2010 television film based on the 1925 novel The Counterfeiters by André Gide. The two-hour film was directed by Benoît Jacquot and stars Melvil Poupaud as Edouard X., Maxime Berger as Olivier, and Dolores Chaplin as Lady Lilian Griffith.

Originally Jacquot, who is also the screenwriter, had planned this project as a 180-minute two-parter, but this was later reduced to a 120-minute telefilm.

The film premiered on France 2 on January 5, 2011. In March 2012, it was released on region 2 DVD by Optimale.

== Cast ==
- Melvil Poupaud as Edouard
- Patrick Mille as Robert de Passavant
- Jules-Angelo Bigarnet as Bernard
- Maxime Berger as Olivier
- Laurence Cordier as Laura Azaïs
- Vladimir Consigny as Vincent
- Dolores Chaplin as Lilian Griffith
- Jean-Marc Stehlé as Mr. Lapérouse
- Anne Bennent as Sphroniska
- Thomas Momplot as Georges
- Sandrine Dumas as Pauline
- Daniel Martin as Oscar
- Anne Duverneuil as Sarah
- Hervé Pierre as Mr. Profitendieu
- Catherine Davenier as Mrs. Profitendieu
- Pavel Stepantchuk as Boris
- Jean-Damien Barbin as Alfred Jarry
