= Château d'Airvault =

Castle in France

- Airvault in France
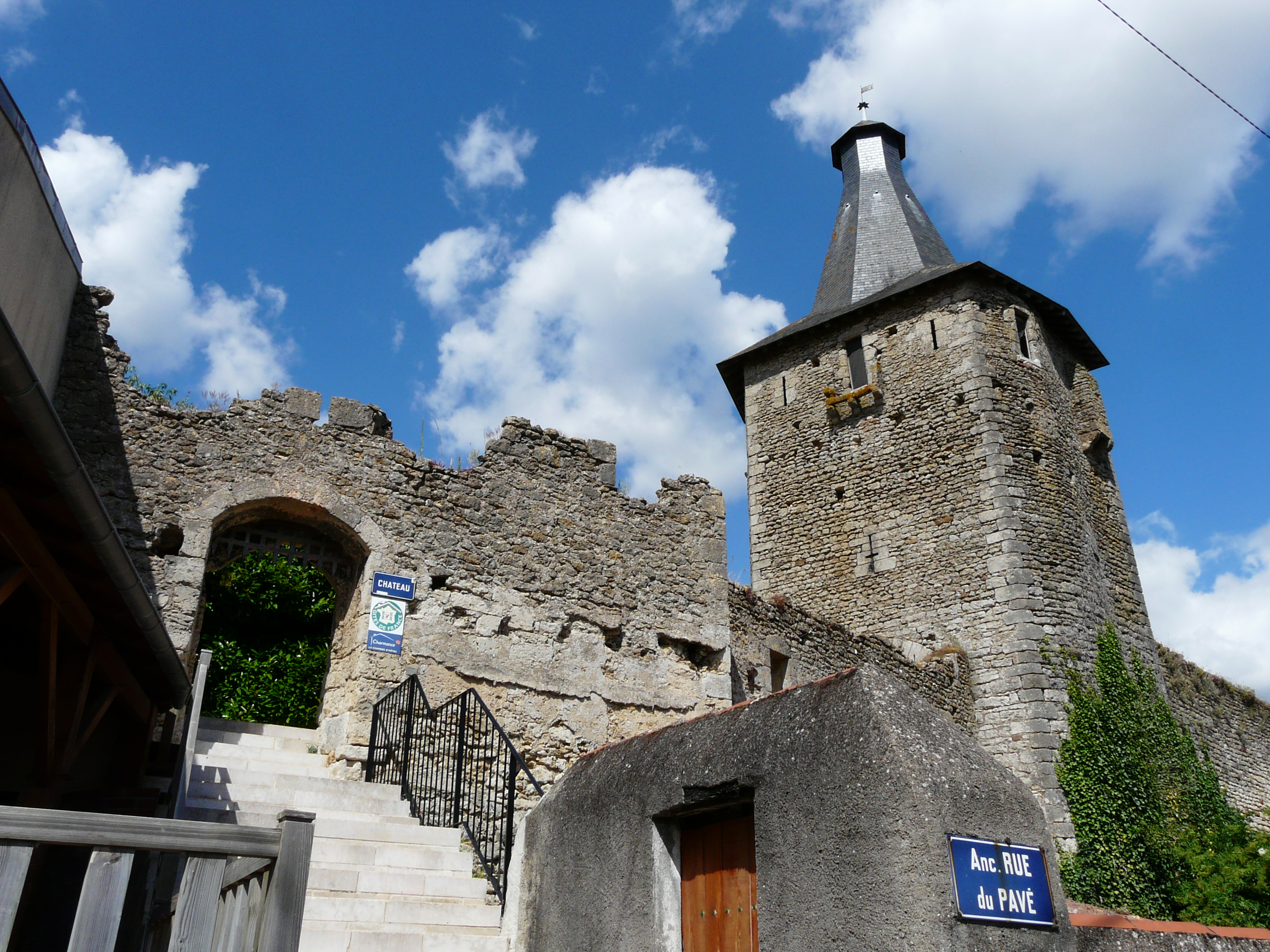
- The gatehouse

Site information
- Type: Castle
- Owner: Privately owned

Location
- Coordinates: 44°49′39″N 0°08′17″W

Site history
- Built: 11th - 15th centuries

The Château d'Airvault is a medieval castle situated in the French commune of Airvault in the département of Deux-Sèvres and the Nouvelle-Aquitaine région.

Airvault stands in the Thouet valley and includes the listed monuments of the Saint-Pierre Abbey and church. The town is dominated by the castle built on a hill. In the Middle Ages, this strategic position made it an important part of the powerful defensive system of the town.

== History ==
The castle was constructed on an earlier castrum.

It was besieged and conquered in 1207 by Philip II of France.

On 22 September 1565, Jean Ysoré, Baron d’Airvault had the honour of welcoming Charles IX and the young Prince of Navarre, the future King Henri IV.

On 3 October 1569, after the Battle of Moncontour which saw the victory of the Duke of Anjou (the future Henri III), Gaspard de Coligny who commanded the defeated Calvinists the burning of the castle in revenge for René Ysoré (son of Jean Ysoré) who contributed to his defeat. Burned, the castle was abandoned by its owners.

At the start of the 20th century, the owner constructed a house in the lower court and planned to destroy the castle to sell the materials.

The remains of the former castle were inscribed as a monument historique on 3 October 1929 and classified on 4 September 2007 for the enceinte and its towers, the remains of the barbican and the grounds.

== The castle ==
The Château d'Airvault is considered by the historian Henri Bodin as "one of the rare remaining specimens of military architecture of the 11th century". From this time, there remains the enceinte with its two uncrowned towers and its keep whose well-preserved silhouette marks the urban landscape.

The 14th- and 15th-century buildings inside the enceinte replaced in the original buildings.

According to Bodin, the castle was built on the site of the former Gallic oppidum and the builders of the castle were inspired by the square towers of this old oppidum and the way to put them on the ramparts. It is this peculiarity of construction which makes it possible to date the castle of Airvault at least to the 11th century. (Some think that it would be earlier than the beginning of the construction of the church).

The castle has an enceinte whose crenellation was leveled in the 1940s. Two quadrangular towers added obliquely to the corners of the enceinte on the ramparts are dated to the 13th or 14th century. The rectangular châtelet, defended by a bretèche and hoardings, is pierced by a door with a portcullis and murder hole giving access to the court.

The main dwelling of the 15th century is located along the west curtain wall. Among the outbuildings are the prison with its two vaulted cells lit by an arrowslit and a stable.

== See also ==
- List of castles in France
