= Tessonnière =

- Part of Airvault
- Location of Tessonnière
- Location within France Location within Nouvelle-Aquitaine
- Coordinates: 46°48′50″N 0°11′23″W
- Country: France
- Region: Nouvelle-Aquitaine
- Department: Deux-Sèvres
- Arrondissement: Parthenay
- Canton: Le Val de Thouet
- Commune: Airvault
- Area^{1}: 14.60 km^{2} (5.64 sq mi)
- Elevation: 126 m (413 ft)
- Highest elevation: 159 m (522 ft)
- Lowest elevation: 108 m (354 ft)
- Population (2021): 326
  - Density: 22.3/km^{2} (57.8/sq mi)
- Time zone: UTC+01:00 (CET)
  - Summer (DST): UTC+02:00 (CEST)
- Postal code: 79600
- ^{1} French Land Register data, which excludes lakes, ponds, glaciers > 1 km^{2} (0.386 sq mi or 247 acres) and river estuaries.

Tessonnière (French pronunciation: [tɛsɔnjɛʁ]) is a former commune in the department of Deux-Sèvres in western France. On 1 January 2019 it was merged into the commune of Airvault.

== Population ==
Historical population
Year	Pop.	±% p.a.
2006	288	—
2011	320	+2.13%
2015	312	−0.63%
2021	326	+0.73%
Source: INSEE

== See also ==
- Communes of the Deux-Sèvres department
