= Madeleine Collins =

2021 French film

- Directed by: Antoine Barraud
- Screenplay by: Antoine Barraud
- Produced by: Justin Taurand
- Starring: Virginie Efira; Bruno Salomone
- Cinematography: Gordon Spooner
- Edited by: Anita Roth
- Music by: Romain Trouillet
- Production companies: Les Films du Bélier; Frakas Productions; Close Up Films; VOO; BeTV; RTBF
- Release date: 4 September 2021 (VFF)
- Running time: 102 minutes
- Countries: France; Belgium; Switzerland
- Language: French

Madeleine Collins is a 2021 international co-production drama film directed by Antoine Barraud.

== Cast ==
- Virginie Efira as Judith Fauvet
- Bruno Salomone as Melvil Fauvet
- Quim Gutiérrez as Abdel Soriano
- Loïse Benguerel as Ninon Soriano

== Reception ==
On review aggregator Rotten Tomatoes, the film holds an approval rating of 92% based on 25 reviews, with an average rating of 7.2/10. On Metacritic, the film has a weighted average score of 64 out of 100, based on 6 critics, indicating "generally favorable reviews".
