= World Soundtrack Award – Lifetime Achievement =

Annual Belgian music award

The Lifetime Achievement Award is an award given each year at the World Soundtrack Awards. Like other awards at other award academies, this award recognizes lifetime dedication and excellence in a specific field, in this case TV and film score (and sometimes just music in general). It has been given to at least one person each year since the Awards' debut in 2001.

== Recipients ==
Year	Name	Nationality
2001	Elmer Bernstein	United States
2002	George Martin	United Kingdom
2003	Maurice Jarre	France
2004	Alan Bergman and Marilyn Bergman	United States
2005	Jerry Leiber and Mike Stoller	United States
2006	Peer Raben	Germany
2007	Mikis Theodorakis	Greece
2008	Angelo Badalamenti	United States
2009	Marvin Hamlisch	United States
2010	John Barry	United Kingdom
2011	Giorgio Moroder	Italy
2012	Pino Donaggio	Italy
2013	Riz Ortolani	Italy
2014	Francis Lai	France
2015	Patrick Doyle	United Kingdom
2015	George Fenton	United Kingdom
2016	Ryuichi Sakamoto	Japan
2017	David Shire	United States
2018	Philippe Sarde	France
2019	Krzysztof Penderecki	Poland
2019	Frédéric Devreese	Belgium
2020	Gabriel Yared	France
2021	Eleni Karaindrou	Greece
2022	Bruno Coulais	France
2023	Nicola Piovani	Italy
2023	Laurence Rosenthal	United States
2024	Elliot Goldenthal	United States
2025	Philip Glass	United States
2025	Michael Nyman	United Kingdom
2026	Trevor Jones	South Africa

== Laureates per country ==
The following table shows the number of laureates per country:

Rank	Country	Laureates
1	United States	11
2	United Kingdom	5
2	France	5
3	Italy	4
4	Greece	2
5	Germany	1
5	Japan	1
5	Poland	1
5	Belgium	1
5	South Africa	1
	Total	32
