= Hard Target 2 =

2016 film by Roel Reiné

- Official DVD cover
- Directed by: Roel Reiné
- Written by: Dominic Morgan; Matthew Harvey
- Produced by: Chris Lowenstein
- Starring: Scott Adkins; Robert Knepper; Rhona Mitra; Ann Truong; Temuera Morrison
- Cinematography: Roel Reiné
- Edited by: Radu Ion
- Music by: Trevor Morris; Jack Wall
- Production company: Universal 1440 Entertainment
- Distributed by: Universal Pictures
- Release date: September 6, 2016
- Running time: 104 minutes
- Country: United States
- Language: English

Hard Target 2 is a 2016 American action film directed by Roel Reiné, starring Scott Adkins, Robert Knepper, Temuera Morrison and Rhona Mitra. It is a reboot of, or sequel to, the 1993 film Hard Target, which starred Jean-Claude Van Damme as a homeless cajun fighting a human hunting operation in New Orleans. The new film sees Adkins as a disgraced MMA champion who is unwittingly hired to act as prey in a deadly game of cat and mouse through the jungles of Myanmar. The film has no narrative connection to the first film.

== Plot ==
Professional MMA fighter Wes Baylor takes on Jonny Sutherland in a welterweight championship fight at the fictional Chateau de Vegas Hotel. Upset with the judges' score, Baylor tries to knock Sutherland out and accidentally kills him. Overwhelmed with guilt, Baylor enters self-imposed exile in Thailand.

Six months later, Baylor is still haunted by the death of Sutherland and competes in underground fight clubs. Jonah Aldrich watches Baylor fight and, impressed with him, offers him $1 million for a private one-off match in Myanmar. Upon arrival, Baylor is informed that he will be the victim of a lethal hunt organized by Aldrich. Baylor is given a water bottle and money belt which, unbeknown to him, has a GPS tracker hidden inside. The hunting party consists of Sofia, bullfighter Esparto, video game designer Landon, Maduka, Jacob "Texas" Zimling, Zimling's son Tobias, Aldrich's right-hand man Madden, and Aldrich himself. In addition, the party is accompanied by a group of corrupt Myanmar Army soldiers.

Maduka shoots Baylor with a sniper rifle at a waterfall, but Baylor goes underwater, sneaks up on Maduka, and beats him to death. While fleeing from them, Baylor comes across a local woman named Tha, who helps him get to the border. As the hunt continues, Aldrich gives the hunters motorcycles equipped with guns and rocket launchers. Baylor fights them and commandeers a motorcycle, leaving Tha alone. Zimling and Tobias attempt to kill Tha, but Tobias has a brief change of heart and flees. Tha then kills Zimling with a machete, while Baylor fights Sofia. After knocking her unconscious, he regroups with Tha and they run away. The two go to Tha's house to treat wounds, where Baylor learns something strange about Tha and her village.

After running towards the border, Tha and Baylor come across a field full of landmines. Aldrich and the party arrive at the edge of the minefield, having tracked Baylor via the GPS. Tobias, angered by the death of his father, chases Baylor with an M-16 and is killed by a crossbow bolt that Baylor fires. He drops the assault rifle as he dies and triggers an explosion of the mines. The explosion gives Baylor and Tha enough time to hide in a cave, where Tha finds her missing brother, who is revealed as a previous target of Aldrich's group. He had managed to evade the hunting group's detection and hide.

In the morning, Tha and her brother run away, leaving Baylor behind. Tha and her brother are captured, and Baylor rescues them by capturing Landon. Tha then shoves a sharp object through Sofia's neck which kills her. Meanwhile, Landon's neck is slashed by Aldrich for secretly recording all of the events, which was forbidden. Baylor, Tha, and her brother all reach the border and wonder how Aldrich continuously knows where they are. They find the tracker in the money belt. Baylor takes on the soldiers working for Aldrich and remaining hunters alone while Tha and her brother hide. Esparto goes after Tha and her brother but is killed with a fishing harpoon. Meanwhile, Baylor runs away with the boat from the army camp and heads towards the border.

Pursued by the army, Baylor manages to reach the border bridge, where he faces Aldrich and Madden in a final showdown. Aldrich accidentally shoots Madden after Baylor uses him as a human shield who tries to shoot him and Baylor severely beats Aldrich, who orders the Myanmar army to fire on him. Tha suddenly arrives and bribes the general into ceasing fire to save Baylor. Aldrich is outraged and attempts to shoot Baylor himself, at which point the general orders his army to shoot him dead. Having survived the ordeal, Baylor returns to Thailand with Tha to teach children Taekwondo.

== Cast ==
- Scott Adkins as Wes Baylor
- Robert Knepper as Aldrich
- Rhona Mitra as Sofia
- Temuera Morrison as Madden
- Ann Truong as Tha
- Adam Saunders as Esparto
- Jamie Timony as Landon
- Peter Hardy as Jacob Zimling
- Sean Keenan as Tobias Zimling
- Troy Honeysett as Jonny Sutherland
- Gigi Veliciat as Maduka
- Katrina Grey as Kay Sutherland
- Yanin Vismitananda as Aldrich's Friend

== Production ==
=== Development and writing ===
Hard Target 2 was first mentioned in the media of the Netherlands, director Roel Reiné's country, in August 2015, with filming slated to start in October of that year. While the picture's numbered title suggests a sequel, Universal's initial announcement billed it as a reboot. Leading man Scott Adkins also described it as "almost more like a reboot".

Adkins explained that he and Reiné wanted the film to be a more direct sequel, with Robert Knepper playing the brother of Emil Fouchon, the 1993 film's villain essayed by Lance Henriksen. However the idea was vetoed by Universal executives, who insisted the new film be treated as standalone. Reiné was still able to give Knepper's character a single-bullet pistol as a way to suggest a kinship with Fouchon, who used one in the original.

According to Reine, the director of the original film, John Woo, was supposed to accept a producer credit on Hard Target 2. However, Woo was not mentioned in Universal's December 1, 2015 statement following production wrap, nor in the finished film. Nonetheless, the movie was given a number of stylistic flourishes and action sequences reminiscent of his style, such as shots of doves, a mexican standoff, and a motorcycle gunfight. The film also incorporates a helicopter boat chase, which Woo wanted to include in the original but could not.

=== Casting ===
Even before the screenplay was finalized, Reiné had Scott Adkins in mind to play Baylor. Adkins had to get clearance from Disney to take the role, as he had already signed on to be in the Marvel Studios film Doctor Strange. They eventually agreed to let him skip training sessions for the Marvel film so that he could do both. His name was kept a secret until the beginning of the shoot, with Reiné refusing to disclose it in interviews. However, in late October, a picture from the film's "fight camp" (fight choreography rehearsals) emerged, revealing Adkins as the lead actor. Adkins was a fan of the first movie, and had even won a contest to attend an early screening of it as a teenager. However, he still turned down the sequel at first, as he had already been associated with Van Damme on several projects, and was eager to stand out on his own. He ultimately realized that the film would be made with somebody else that had less passion for the property, and felt he was best for the role.

Knepper was offered the part of main antagonist Jonah Aldrich outright, and did not have to audition for it. He travelled to Thailand with his wife, taking advantage of the trip to discover local culture. He was also impressed with Reiné's Admiral, a prestige Dutch historical film that showed a different side of the director than the commercial sequels he is internationally known for. Temuera Morrison, who plays Aldrich's right-hand man Madden, had appeared in two of Reiné's previous Thailand films, The Marine 2 and The Scorpion King 3.

Vietnamese-Australian actress Ann Truong had experience with muay thai and boxing in her personal life. She originally sent a taped audition for the role of Sofia, but Reiné asked her to play Tha instead, and travelled to Sydney for an in-person interview before giving her the job. Thai martial arts star Jeeja Yanin's participation was unplanned. Roel Reine offered her to participate in the film while she was visiting friends on the set, and she accepted. She headlines a group of thugs confronting Baylor towards the end of the film. Also present in the scene is her Raging Phoenix co-star Kazu Patrick Tang, who served as the film's assistant stunt coordinator.

=== Filming and post-production ===
Principal photography took place in two different parts of Thailand, including the Bangkok capital region, over the course of 21 days, and concluded on November 15, 2015. The picture had a budget of US$4.5 million.

As usual, Roel Reiné served as his own cinematographer, and also manned the cameras, including those mounted on drones and zip-lines. It was the Dutchman's fifth time working in Thailand, and he had a long-standing relationship with some of his crew. Production services were provided by Living Films, a Chiang Mai-based outfit founded by American expatriate Chris Lowenstein, and a frequent partner for Western productions shot in the country, including Reiné's The Marine 2 and The Man with the Iron Fists 2

Seng Kawee of Seng Stunt Team, who choreographed all of Reiné's Thailand efforts, and whom he lists as his favorite stunt coordinator to work with, returned for this movie as well. Unlike for the Thailand-shot Ninja: Shadow of a Tear, Adkins did not have the luxury of working with his preferred choreographer, Sweden's Tim Man. He was thus more involved in the planning of his physical scenes, and designed the opening professional bout by himself. Adkins also did his own driving during the helicopter speedboat chase.

The sports arena shown in early scenes was located in Bangkok, rather than in Las Vegas as portrayed in the story, and the fateful MMA fight was captured in a single day. The finale was originally set to take place on a rooftop in Bangkok's Chinatown, but the location became unavailable. Producer Lowenstein had earlier scouted a picturesque bridge on the River Kwai, and suggested the climactic showdown be transported there.

Visual effects were done by Bulgaria-based Cinemotion, a veteran company of many Universal 1440 productions. They included some enhancements to Sofia's death, which had been devised on the fly during filming. Reiné had an agreement in place with Adkins that gave the latter a right of approval concerning his fight scenes, and he okayed their final edit before picture lock. Post production on the film was announced as complete in early March 2016.

== Music ==
=== Soundtrack ===
Hard Target 2: Original Motion Picture Soundtrack

Film score by Trevor Morris Jack Wall
- Released: September 2, 2016
- Genre: Orchestral, electronica
- Length: 62:57
- Label: Back Lot Music

Hard Target 2's score was composed and produced by Trevor Morris and Jack Wall. Wall, a BAFTA Award nominee for his video game music, had previously written additional cues for some of Morris' TV series work, and received his first feature film credit as a main composer. It was released by Universal's film and television music label Back Lot Music.

== Release ==
=== Home media ===
Hard Target 2 was released domestically on DVD and Blu-ray on September 6, 2016. Among the bonus features included on the disc were an audio commentary with director Roel Reiné, stars Scott Adkins and Robert Knepper, composer Trevor Morris and camera operator Rolf Dekens, three behind-the-scenes featurettes, two outtakes montages and a short video biography of the film's fictional manhunters.

The film received a same-day release on Netflix in the United States. In early January 2023, analytics service FlixPatrol reported that, thanks to its addition to the streaming platform's catalogue in several international markets, Hard Target 2 had reached fourth place in its Netflix worldwide feature film chart.

== Reception ==
=== Critical response ===
Hard Target 2 received a polarized reception, depending largely on whether it was viewed as a companion piece to the 1993 theatrical release, or as a standalone product.

Rob Hunter of Slashfilm said "[t]he action is less effective overall, but worse, it fails to even approach the original's absolute bonkers execution [...] The addition of CG hurts as well, [...] and [the] female sidekick's subplot does little but drag the film down." Tyler Foster of DVD Talk rated it one out of five and wrote, "[a]s mindless entertainment, all Reine and screenwriters Matt Harvey and Dominic Morgan really need is some consistency, but none of them seem to care." Joblo.com rated the film a five out of ten, and described it as "a disappointment".

Martin Liebman of Blu-ray.com was moderately positive. Although he complained that the film was similar to Reiné's recent The Condemned 2, he acknowledged that the Dutchman "knows his way around these movies and proves more than capable of delivering a slick, sleek, and hard-hitting experience." Outlaw Vern wrote that "it’s hard to completely avoid comparing this to Hard Target, a movie [...] that was made with four times the budget [...] by one of the greatest action directors who ever lived", but added "[w]hether or not it’s worthy of the Hard Target title, it’s another respectable entry in the Adkins catalog".

Matthew Hartman of HighDef Digest enjoyed the film, saying that while he "thoroughly expected to hate Hard Target 2", it proved to be "a must see film for action and martial arts fans featuring Adkins in incredible fight scenes." Sean Radican of MMA Torch was most enthusiastic, writing that "director Roel Reiné deserves a ton of credit for making this film look as good as it does", while he praised Adkins' "sympathetic character and a fantastic cast of villains surrounding him". He rated it an eight out of ten.
