= Sabine Crossen =

French American actress and director

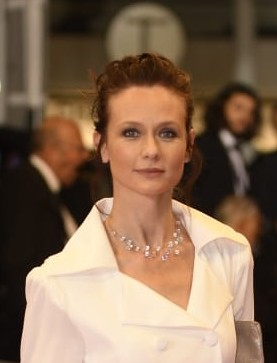
- Sabine Crossen
- Born: Sabine Camille Crossen; 27 November 1983 (age 42); Béthune, France
- Occupations: Actor, director
- Years active: 2000-2023

Sabine Crossen is a French American actress and director.

== Early life ==
Born in Béthune, Hauts-de-France, France, to an American father and a French mother, Sabine Crossen grew up in New Zealand before settling at age 20 in Paris, France where she took drama lessons at the Actorat Dramatic Arts College.

== Career ==
Her first (uncredited) appearance in a feature film was that of an elf in The Lord of the Rings: The Fellowship of the Ring in 2001.

In 2003, she starred as killer Kim Lee in the French film Shadow Girl by Steven Couchouron and Isabelle Lukacie, which won awards at the Houston (United States) and Thessaloniki (Greece) festivals.

From 2005 to 2006 she made appearances in four French films (L'Antidote, Brice de Nice, Olé!, Jean-Philippe)) and two short films Surface Sensible, and Illusion.

In 2006 she plays in the video game Evidence: The Last Ritual and in the straight-to-DVD comedy Car Academy. In 2007 she had a bit part in the Franco-American film Hitman directed by Xavier Gens. In 2011 she played the part of "The Blonde" in Éric Lavaines Bienvenue à bord (Welcome on Board). Two years later she appeared in the movie The Big Bad Wolf and in The Borderland where she went to shoot in Hong Kong.

On television, she became a columnist in 2002 on Frédéric Beigbeder Canal+ show Hypershow. In 2007, she participated in an episode of the series Le juge est une femme (The Judge is a Woman, in 2008 to an episode the series Femmes de loi (Women of law), in 2009 in an episode of La vie est à nous (Life is ours) and in two episodes of Plus belle la vie.

For her directorial debut in 2015, the short film L'amour rend Aveugle (Love Makes Blind), Crossen was awarded the Ciné Ma Vénus Public Prize in 2017, and Best Short Film and Best director awards at the 2015 Monaco International Film Festival. She has lived in London since 2013.
