= Evidence: The Last Ritual =

2006 video game

Evidence: The Last Ritual (US) In Memoriam: Le Dernier Rituel (FR)
- Developer: Lexis Numérique
- Publishers: Ubisoft (UK/EU), The Adventure Company (US)
- Platform: Microsoft Windows
- Release: 16 October 2006 (US); September 2006 (FR)
- Genres: Alternate reality game; adventure; puzzle
- Mode: Single-player

In Memoriam 2 (known as Evidence: The Last Ritual in the US, In Memoriam: Le Dernier Rituel in France) is an adventure game by French studio Lexis Numérique for Windows platform, and is notable for its alternate reality-style gameplay, in which the player receives e-mails from other in-game characters, including the game's main antagonist, as well as being asked to find a lot of information and clues to the games' puzzles on the Internet, both from real websites, and from specially-created websites that have been mixed in with other "real-world" domains. In addition to these, the French version of the game (only within France) offers (for a one-time fee) to send SMS messages to the player directly to their mobile phones, as well as the ability to call any of the characters and have a real phone conversation with them.

== Plot ==
The game finishes the same story previously started in Missing: Since January. Jessica Moses is searching for her missing brother, Adrian, who suddenly disappeared six years ago. Jack Lorski, the journalist who had been previously kidnapped in Part I of the game is found dead, with a large portion of his torso removed. A couple of weeks later, the authorities received another DVD from the Phoenix full of clues, murders and Jessica's movie with different riddles and enigmas. In order to stop him, the authorities have copied the disk hundreds of times for distribution to help with the case.

Jessica is contacted by Adrian, who had been estranged from the family for several years. She and her compatriot Sharon travel to New England in search of him. After meeting with a police officer in charge of Adrians missing persons case and a former roommate, whom Adrian had studied graphic design with, Jessica becomes concerned that Adrian had become involved in some kind of criminal activity. After discovering a secluded cabin were Adrian had been staying, they are led to a Catholic splinter sect known as the OSCS. Jessica visits the groups headquarters, discovering the building is abandoned with the exception of a squatter. They then visit an ex-cult member, who fills them in on life in the cult as brutal and oppressive.

Prior to this, though presented in tandem, Jack Lorski is working with a Portuguese police officer, investigating several apparently random murders of elderly men. After discovering a link between them and a group known as Manus Domini, Jack is convinced the killer is the reemergent Phoenix. They then discover the body of a much younger man near an abandoned copper mine, with his heart torn out. After seeing pictures of the man, Jack is initially convinced that it is the Phoenix himself, but finally agrees that it was only the Phoenix's disciple, Adrian, the computer programmer for the initial CD as well as the lion's share of the programming of the current game. Jessica and Sharon receive a message from Adrian asking to meet him at Ouren castle after dark. Jessica is knocked out and Sharon is abducted. Jessica is confronted with the fact that her brother was murdered trying to warn her away from the castle, and is put in protective custody. Jack and the police are presented with evidence that the Phoenix will be performing another ritual murder at a different castle, and rush to capture him. They realize, after finding a women's severed hand, that it was ruse. Upon returning to the safe house, they find Jessica missing and the entire household guard dead.

At this level in the game, lines of code begin running through various portions of the puzzles. This is, revealed by emails, a spyware program, written by Adrian and the Phoenix, to decode Book XIV using the distributed computing system created by the duplication of the game disc. An ICPA programmer creates a tracer program to pinpoint the Phoenix's current location, believed to be in Scotland, by identifying his IP address. Then the player is tasked with discovering the Phoenix's username and password, which was hidden, by Adrian, in the various films of the CD, as a failsafe in the event of his death.

The Phoenix's location is tracked to northern Scotland, where Sharon's mutilated body is discovered, along with additional victims from the surrounding countryside. Gerde Hanke, the profiler from the previous game, tracks the Phoenix to his hideout, an excavated warehouse. After cracking the Phoenix's password, the player is given access to the warehouse's surveillance system, and guides Gerde through a series of gates meant to be similar to and symbolize the interior of a pyramid tomb. Upon reaching the culmination, a new security system is accessed. The body of "Osiris", assembled from the various body parts of the Phoenix's victims, lies hanging against a wall, with Jessica slumped on the floor nearby. Gerde enters and is attacked, presumably by the Phoenix. He knocks the person out as the room catches fire. Grabbing Jessica's prone form, he dashes from the room, presumably leaving the Phoenix to burn alive. Following the end of the plot, an email is sent to the player from a helper who infrequently contacts the player and is strongly hinted at being the actual Phoenix, still alive.

The puzzles are similar in nature to those of the previous game, with incorporations from newer services and websites, such as Google Earth and Mapquest. Several features are carried over from the previous game, such as the 8 mm film that was central to the previous game, as well as many improvements, including the ability to replay video clips that had previously been seen, which frustrated many fans who operated under the premise that the clips contained clues, but could only be viewed once.

== Cast ==
- Jack Lorski: Olivier Chenevat
- Gerd Hanke: Stéphane Cornicard
- Jessica Moses: Sabine Crossen
- Manuela Ortiz: Marta Domingo
- Sharon Berti: Susanna Martini
- Fernando: Fernando Nascimento

== Development ==
The developers decided to design an 'add-on' instead of a full-fledged sequel to their 2003 game In Memoriam due to the excessive time and financial commitment that would have been required.

== Other games in series ==
E:TLR is the sequel to Missing: Since January, which was released in France (where it had been developed) in October 2003, then in the US in June 2004.

== Reception ==
Reception

Review score
Publication	Score
Computer Games Magazine	4/5
