= Yellowbird (film) =

- International theatrical release poster
- Directed by: Christian De Vita
- Written by: Antoine Barraud; Cory Edwards
- Produced by: Corinne Kouper
- Starring: Seth Green; Dakota Fanning; Christine Baranski; Yvette Nicole Brown; Richard Kind; Jim Rash; Danny Glover; Elliott Gould
- Cinematography: Laurent Fluetot
- Music by: Stephen Warbeck
- Production company: TeamTO
- Distributed by: Haut et Court (France); SC Films International (international)
- Release dates: 11 October 2014 (London Film Festival); 4 February 2015 (France)
- Running time: 88 minutes
- Countries: France; Belgium
- Language: English
- Budget: €10 million
- Box office: $3.8 million

Yellowbird (French: Gus, petit oiseau, grand voyage) is a 2014 English-language CG-animated fantasy film directed by Christian De Vita.

The film features the voices of Seth Green, Dakota Fanning, Jim Rash, Yvette Nicole Brown, Christine Baranski, Richard Kind, Danny Glover and Elliott Gould. Additional performances by Brady Corbet and Jamie Denbo.

== Plot ==
Darius (voiced by Danny Glover), the leader of a flock of birds, is wounded just before it is time for the birds to migrate to Africa. Information about how to lead the migration must be passed to the first bird that encounters Darius. That is Yellowbird (voiced by Seth Green) who is excited by the challenge but has very little life experience. Karl (voiced by Jim Rash) expected to take over as leader but Yellowbird lies to the flock and leads them south for the migration. He is really only a young hatchling with no experience and endangers the flock many times. Delf (voiced by Dakota Fanning) always supports him in the beginning. He flies north by mistake, landing in Holland and not Spain. The flock then crosses the North Sea and ends up somewhere with snow. Finally Yellowbird tells the truth and it turns out the "Iron Bird" is not to be feared but really is a solution to their problem. They end up taking a plane to Africa. Yellowbird officially becomes part of the flock and everybody celebrates.

== Voice cast ==
Character	(France) French Voice	(United States) American Voice
Yellowbird/Sam	Arthur Dupont	Seth Green
Delf	Sara Forestier	Dakota Fanning
Darius	Pierre Richard	Danny Glover
Karl	Bruno Salomone	Jim Rash
The Owl	Bruno Salomone	Elliott Gould
Janet		Christine Baranski
Ladybug	Isabelle Renauld	Yvette Nicole Brown
Michka	Patrice Dozier	Richard Kind
Willy		Brady Corbet
Maggie	Nathalie Boutefeu	Jamie Denbo
Fleck		Jadon Sand
Fleck Adult		Cedric Yarbrough
Max		Zachary Gordon
Gigi		Joey King
Anton		Ryan Lee
Lisa		Tara Strong
Marjorie		Conchata Ferrell
Rodent 1		Chris Parson
Squirrel		André Sogliuzzo
Pigeons		Fred Tatasciore

== Reception ==
=== Awards ===
- Best Soundtrack Award at the Voices of Stars Festival, Port Leucate

=== Critical reception ===
Overall, Yellowbird receives a positive reception in France.

On Allociné, the press gives it an average of 3.7/5 based on 12 critic reviews. Audience members give it an average of 3.6/5 based on viewer reviews.

On IMDb, it has a rating of 5.2/10 based on 373 user ratings.

=== Box Office ===
In France, Gus the Little Bird, Big Journey has accumulated 282,325 admissions.

== About the Film ==
=== The Ornithological Perspective ===
Many scenes are inspired by real events, whether in detail or in broader elements. Ornithologist Guilhem Lesaffre was consulted throughout the production to guide the creators of the characters and animators on bird morphology, feather arrangement, aspects of flight, behavior, and postures.

Almost as accurate as in real life

The birds were created based on anecdotes from ornithologist Guilhem Lesaffre to enhance realism. Additionally, each bird in the film resembles a specific species found in nature. For example, Gus resembles a small wader, Delf takes the traits of a swallow, Karl is a hybrid of a vulture and a crow, and Darius can be compared to a cardinal.

=== Video Game ===
A video game was adapted and released alongside the film: Gus : À vol d'oiseau on iOS and Android, developed by Artefact Studios and published by Bulkypix. In this 3D game, the player controls Gus and must complete flying challenges.
