= Brice de Nice =

- Film poster
- Directed by: James Huth
- Written by: Karine Angeli Jean Dujardin James Huth
- Based on: Character "Brice de Nice" by Jean Dujardin
- Produced by: Éric Altmayer Nicolas Altmayer
- Starring: Jean Dujardin Clovis Cornillac Élodie Bouchez Alexandra Lamy
- Cinematography: Philippe Piffeteau
- Edited by: Antoine Vareille James Huth
- Music by: Bruno Coulais
- Distributed by: TFM Distribution
- Release date: 6 April 2005
- Running time: 98 minutes
- Country: France
- Language: French
- Budget: $6.1 million
- Box office: $33 million

Brice de Nice (French pronunciation: [bʁis də nis], lit. 'Brice from Nice') is a 2005 French surreal comedy-drama film directed by James Huth, written by Huth, Jean Dujardin, and Karine Angeli, and starring Dujardin. It is set in France, centering on the character Brice from Nice ("Brice de Nice") originally created by Dujardin for a stage sketch. A sequel to the film, Brice 3, was released on 19 October 2016 with the slogan "Parce que le 2, je l'ai cassé!" (which translates to "Because I broke the Sequel!")

== Plot ==
Brice Agostini, a cocksure and wealthy but child-like man with a Point Break obsession, lives an idle life in Nice, spending his days in the sea with a surf board waiting for a wave. Even though Nice lies on a completely waveless bay on the Mediterranean Sea, Brice hopes that one day a tidal wave will hit as one did in 1979. In the evenings, he hosts massive parties in his luxury property where he defeats all challengers in "casse" (witty put-downs) competitions. He also likes to seduce women but does not appear to know what to do with them. He dreams regularly of finding love with a mermaid.

Reality hits when Brice's father is arrested for money-laundering and all his belongings repossessed. His friends desert him and Brice - who can barely read - has to try his hand, for the first time, at making a living. He proves terrible at it, and after getting fired from a restaurant, attempts instead to rob a bank while wearing a mask of Jacques Chirac in the manner depicted in Point Break. He ends up in hospital, manacled to a bed, next to Marius, a motorcycle thief that he tried to get an escape ride from. Marius is equally child-like, struggling even to speak, and the two bond quickly. They escape in an absurd manner and steal a lorry belonging to the wife of Brice's father's lawyer.

Marius, believing Brice's endless boasts, drives him to Hossegor where a surfing competition is scheduled. Marius begs Brice to take part and share the prize money with him as he needs it for an expensive operation: instead of feet, each of his legs ends with a giant single toe. Brice agrees, touched by his plight and also too embarrassed to confess that he has never actually surfed. In the days leading to the competition, Brice makes new friends thanks to his party animal skills, and clashes with the local champion, Igor. Marius meanwhile, who has stolen a surf board for Brice to compete with, is caught by the behatted saleswoman, Jeanne, who blackmails him into working on her boat. Jeanne's attraction to Marius scares him as he is terrified of his condition coming to light, but after Brice simply explains the situation to her, she shows Marius that his feet do not bother her, and reveals that she has equally freaky giant ears, which she normally conceals.

Brice's fantasies are finally quashed on competition day: he knocks himself out with his board on the first wave and has to be rescued. In a vision, the Bodhi character from Point Break tells him that "dreaming your life is not the same as living your dream". Brice apologises to Marius for letting him down but his friend has forgotten all about getting operated on and now plans to go sailing around the world with Jeanne.

In an epilogue, Brice now works as a humble beach cleaner back in Nice, but the freak wave he hoped for does one day turn up and he manages to jump into it. Regaining consciousness on the ground, he is joined by a female wannabe surfer dressed exactly like him who has missed the wave: Alice from Nice. She is the mermaid from his dreams.

== Cast ==
- Jean Dujardin – Brice Agostini aka Brice from Nice
- Clovis Cornillac – Marius Lacaille aka Marius from Fréjus
- Élodie Bouchez – Jeanne
- Bruno Salomone – Igor from Hossegor
- Alexandra Lamy – Chantal the mermaid / Alice from Nice
- François Chattot – Bertrand Agostini, Brice's father
- Mathias Mlekuz – Eudes Angellini, Agostini's lawyer
- Patrick Ligardes – Bank manager
- Isabelle Caubère – Josie
- Delphine Chanéac – Marjorie
- Sabine Crossen – Mother-In-Law
- Antoine Duléry – Micky, the legend
- Jérémie Quaegebeur – Victor
- Sidney Wernicke – Nikos from Mykonos
- Julia Molkhou – Gladys, the queen of kiss
- Cyril Guei – Babakar from Dakar
- Eric Poulain – Surfin's broadcaster
- Lannick Gautry – Arnaud from Lacanau
- Priscilla Lopes – Natachatte
- Ludovic Bernard – The squirrel man
- Audrey Lamy

The stars of Point Break—Patrick Swayze, Keanu Reeves, Lori Petty—appear in archive footage.

== Soundtrack ==
Jean Dujardin performed the soundtrack of the film, "Le Casse de Brice". The music video was shot and directed by J.G Biggs.
