= Clovis Cornillac =

French actor, film director, and screenwriter (b.1968)

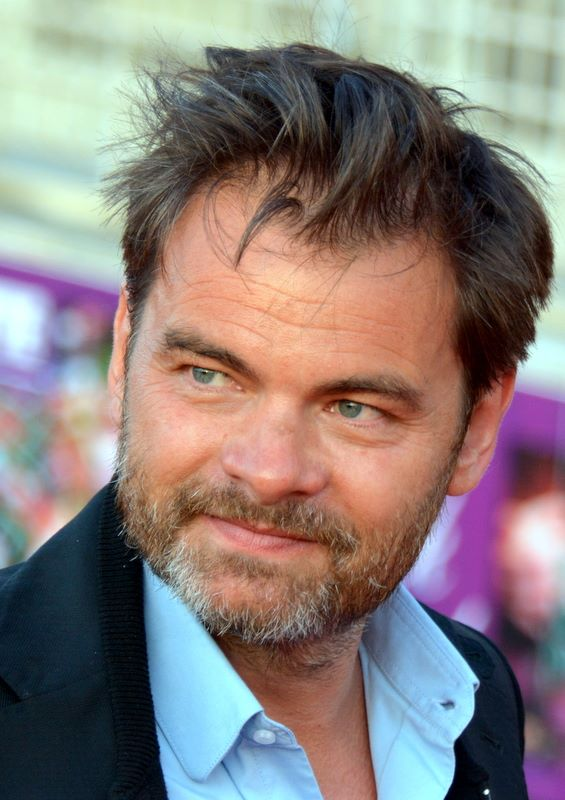
- Clovis Cornillac in 2015
- Born: 16 August 1968 (age 58); Lyon, France
- Occupations: Actor, film director, screenwriter
- Years active: 1982–present
- Spouses: Caroline Proust (m. 1994; div. 2010) Lilou Fogli (m. 2013)
- Children: 3

Clovis Cornillac (French: [klɔvis kɔʁnijak]; born 16 August 1968) is a French actor, film director, and screenwriter.

== Life and career ==
Clovis Cornillac was born to actors Myriam Boyer and Roger Cornillac. He started studying theatre at the age of 14.

He made his debut in cinema in 1984 in Robin Davis's Outlaws. He was noticed by Dominique Besnehard, who introduced him to Peter Brook at the Théâtre des Bouffes du Nord. Cornillac performed in Brook's stage adaptation of Le Mahâbharata.

Cornillac was married to Caroline Proust from 1994 to 2010, with whom he had twin daughters. He married actress Lilou Fogli in 2013, with whom he has a son, Nino, born in 2013.

== Filmography ==
=== As actor ===
Year	Title	Role	Notes
1982	Le village sur la colline	Georges	TV Mini-Series
1984	Tu peux toujours faire tes bagages	Baptiste	TV Movie
1985	Hors-la-loi	Roland	
1988	Il y a maldonne	Marco	
1988	The Unbearable Lightness of Being	Boy in the Bar	
1988	Les années sandwiches	Bouboule	
1989	Crossbow	Edgar	TV Series (1 Episode)
1989	Pause-café	Cyrille	TV Series (1 Episode)
1989	Suivez cet avion	Ascar's assistant	
1990	Chillers	Voyeur	TV Series (1 Episode)
1990	Le trésor des îles chiennes	Rubio	
1991	Les dessous de la passion	Serge	TV Movie
1991	Trois nuits		Short
1992	Bonne chance Frenchie	Henri	TV Mini-Series
1993	Van Loc: un grand flic de Marseille	Sefano Carpi	TV Series (1 Episode)
1993	Pétain	François	
1993	Le juge est une femme	Fabrice Buisson	TV Series (1 Episode)
1993	Le JAP, juge d'application des peines	Pierre	TV Series (1 Episode)
1993	Traverser le jardin		Short
1994	Navarro	Freddy	TV Series (1 Episode)
1994	Les amoureux	Charmillet	
1994	Un été à l'envers	Jacky	TV Movie
1994	La bavure	Jacques Corti	TV Movie; Cognac Festival du Film Policier - Grand Prix Téléfilm - Acting ensemble
1994	Les mickeys		Short
1995	Marie-Louise ou la permission	Bob	
1995	Les Cordier, juge et flic	Fred	TV Series (1 Episode)
1995	Bons baisers de Suzanne		Short
1996	Théo la tendresse	Anthony Varrigues	TV Series (1 Episode)
1996	Billard à l'étage	Joseph	TV Movie
1997	Ouvrez le chien		
1998	La mère Christain	Le Ziquet	
1998	L'échappée	Loulou	TV Movie
1999	Karnaval	Christian	Nominated - César Award for Most Promising Actor
1999	Sam	Théo	TV Movie
1999	Les vilains	Marco	TV Movie
2000	Combats de femme	Henri	TV Series (1 Episode)
2001	Gregoire Moulin vs. Humanity	Jacky	
2001	L'île bleue		TV Movie
2001	Tea Time	Alex	Short
2002	A Private Affair	Freddy	
2002	Carnage	Alexis	
2002	Maléfique	Marcus	
2002	Bois ta Suze		Short
2003	Une affaire qui roule	Jean-Jacques Roux	
2003	À la petite semaine	Didier	Nominated - César Award for Best Supporting Actor
2003	The Very Merry Widows	Alexis Dervin	
2003	Après la pluie, le beau temps	Dubel	
2003	Orages	Patrick Le Henin	TV Movie
2003	Vert paradis	Simon	
2003	Je t'aime, je t'adore	David	
2004	Malabar Princess	Pierre	
2004	Doo Wop	Thierry	
2004	Grossesse nerveuse	Guillaume	Short
2004	Gilles' Wife	Gilles	
2004	The Story of My Life	Kevin	César Award for Best Supporting Actor
2004	A Very Long Engagement	Benoît Notre-Dame	
2005	Close-Up	Paul	Short
2005	Brice de Nice	Marius Lacaille	
2005	Au suivant!	Bernard Dimanche	
2005	Sky Fighters	Sébastien Vallois	
2005	Gris blanc	François Blanc	TV Movie
2005	Le cactus	Patrick Machado	Nominated - Globes de Cristal Award for Best Actor
2006	Les Brigades du Tigre	Paul Valentin	
2006	The Serpent	Plender	
2006	Poltergay	Marc Modena	
2007	Scorpion	Angelo	
2007	Tous à l'Ouest: Une aventure de Lucky Luke	Joe Dalton	
2007	Eden Log	Tolbiac	
2008	Asterix at the Olympic Games	Asterix	
2008	Le nouveau protocole	Raoul Kraft	
2008	Ca$h	Solal	
2008	Paris 36	Milou	
2001–09	Central nuit	Viking	TV Series (14 Episodes)
2009	Bellamy	Jacques Lebas	
2009	La sainte Victoire	Xavier Alvarez	
2010	L'amour, c'est mieux à deux	Michel	
2010	Protéger & servir	Kim Houang	
2010	600 kilos d'or pur	Virgil	
2011	Demain c'est la fin du monde	Franck Guilby	Short
2011	Requiem pour une tueuse	Rico	
2011	Monsieur Papa	Jean-François Vidal	
2011	Une folle envie	Yann Le Guellec	
2011	Mister BOB	Bob Denard	TV Movie
2011	Dans la tourmente	Franck	
2012	Radiostars	Arnold	
2012	Mes héros	Maxime	
2013	La grande boucle	François Nouel	
2015	Chefs	The Chef	TV Series (14 Episodes)
2015	Blind Date	Machin	Also director and screenwriter
2016	Un homme comme les autres	Franck	Announced
2016	Brice 3	Marius Lacaille	
2017	Sahara	Pierre Coré	
2018	Belle and Sebastien: Friends for Life	Joseph	
2021	Nobody Has to Know	Benoît Haubin	

=== As director/screenwriter ===
Year	Title	Notes
2015	Blind Date	Also actor
2018	Belle and Sebastien: Friends for Life	Also actor
2021	C'est Magnifique!	Also actor
2022	Couleurs de l'incendie	Also Actor Based on Pierre Lemaitre's novel

== Theatre ==
- 1984: Une lune pour les déshérités by Alain Françon
- 1990-1991: La dame de chez Maxim's by Alain Françon
- 1997: Edward II by Alain Françon
- 1997: Les Petites Heures by Alain Françon
- 1998: Surfeurs by Xavier Durringer
- 2014: La Contrebasse

== Awards and honours ==
- Made a Knight of the Ordre des Arts et des Lettres by Culture minister Jean-Jacques Aillagon in 2004.
- 2005: Prix Jean Gabin
- 2005: César Award for Best Actor in a Supporting Role for Mensonges et trahisons et plus si affinités...
