= Mark N. Hopkins =

American film director

Mark N. Hopkins is an English-American filmmaker, best known for his award-winning film Living in Emergency.

== Early life and education ==
Hopkins was born in Puerto Rico, growing up in Kenya, the UK, and other places in Europe. He is fluent in Italian having lived in Italy for 10 years as a child. After completing high school at Sevenoaks in the UK, Hopkins attended Georgetown University majoring in philosophy. During this time he spent 8 months in Vietnam studying history and he was the first student from an American university to teach English at the University of Hanoi.

== Career ==
Hopkins' film career began as an assistant to New York-based producer Scott Rudin working on The Truman Show, A Civil Action, Bringing Out The Dead, Angela's Ashes, Sleepy Hollow, Wonder Boys, Shaft, and other films. He left to start an independent production company with the aim of focusing on non-fiction storytelling.

In 2001, Hopkins began working with documentary director George Butler helping to develop and produce Butler's films. The first film was the award-winning documentary The Endurance: Shackleton's Legendary Antarctic Expedition, followed by Roving Mars, and included a series of shorts directed by Hopkins for Columbia Tristar Home Entertainment. Later he produced Butler’s critically acclaimed film Going Upriver: the Long War of John Kerry.

In 2009, Hopkins' film Living in Emergency: Stories of Doctors Without Borders premiered at the Venice Film Festival, was released theatrically, and received numerous awards including the Cinequest San Jose Film Festival Special Jury Award and the Official Best of Fest Award whilst being short-listed for an Oscar for Best Documentary.
