= Les Fins =

- Commune
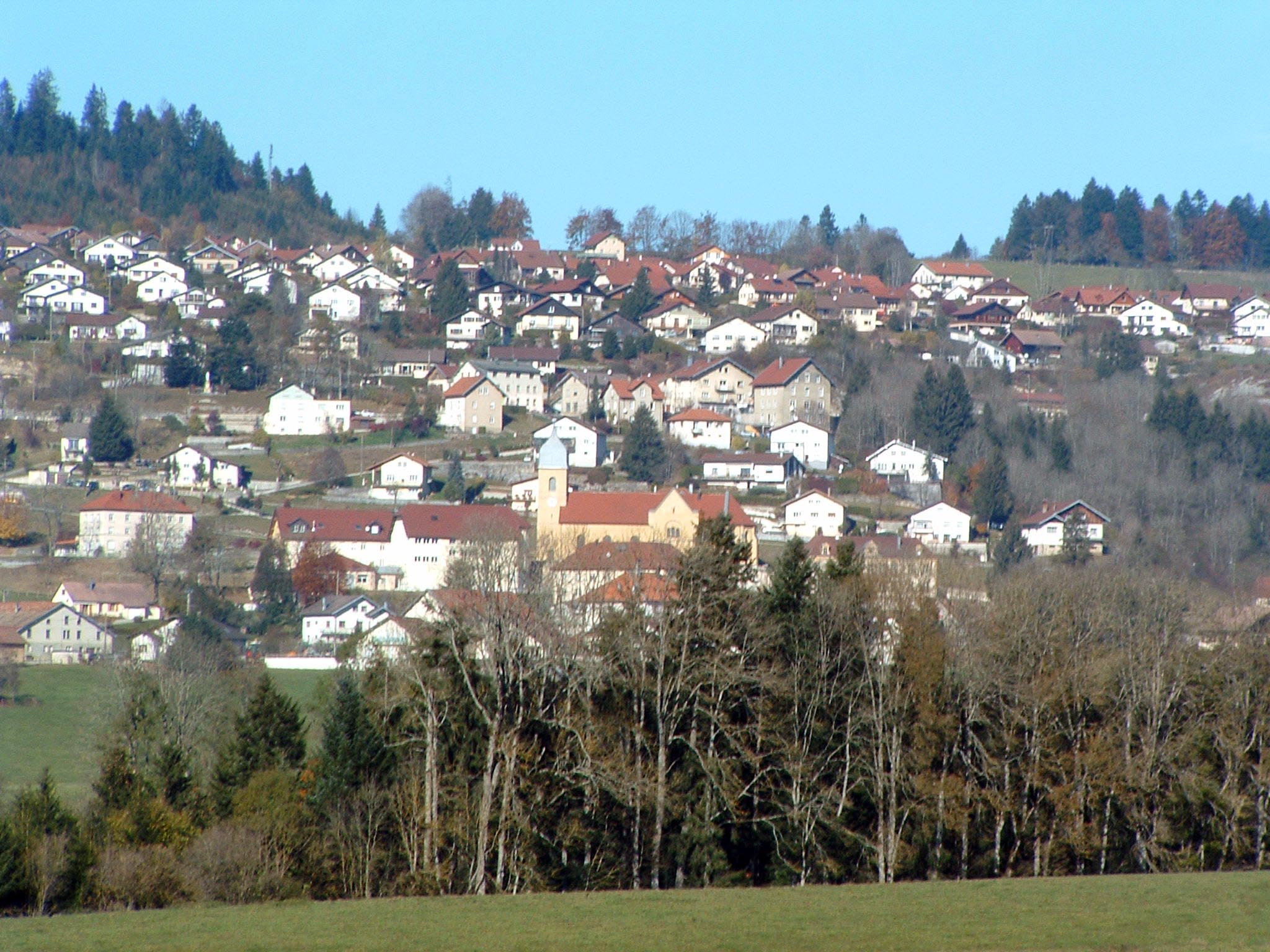
- A general view of Les Fins

- Coat of arms
- Location of Les Fins
- Location within France Location within Bourgogne-Franche-Comté
- Coordinates: 47°04′54″N 6°37′45″E
- Country: France
- Region: Bourgogne-Franche-Comté
- Department: Doubs
- Arrondissement: Pontarlier
- Canton: Morteau
- Intercommunality: Val de Morteau

Government
  - Mayor (2020–2026): Elisabeth Redoutey
- Area^{1}: 25.39 km^{2} (9.80 sq mi)
- Highest elevation: 1,154 m (3,786 ft)
- Lowest elevation: 750 m (2,460 ft)
- Population (2023): 3,048
  - Density: 120.0/km^{2} (310.9/sq mi)
- Time zone: UTC+01:00 (CET)
  - Summer (DST): UTC+02:00 (CEST)
- INSEE/Postal code: 25240 /25500
- ^{1} French Land Register data, which excludes lakes, ponds, glaciers > 1 km^{2} (0.386 sq mi or 247 acres) and river estuaries.

Les Fins (French pronunciation: [le fɛ̃]) is a commune in the Doubs department in the Bourgogne-Franche-Comté region in eastern France.

== Population ==
Historical population

Year	Pop.	±% p.a.
1793	721	—
1851	720	−0.00%
1876	814	+0.49%
1901	960	+0.66%
1906	1,022	+1.26%
1911	1,099	+1.46%
1921	1,071	−0.26%
1926	1,163	+1.66%
1931	1,207	+0.75%
1936	1,220	+0.21%
1946	1,185	−0.29%

Year	Pop.	±% p.a.
1954	1,414	+2.23%
1962	1,641	+1.88%
1968	1,741	+0.99%
1975	2,201	+3.41%
1982	2,346	+0.92%
1990	2,441	+0.50%
1999	2,591	+0.66%
2007	2,805	+1.00%
2012	2,966	+1.12%
2017	3,100	+0.89%
2023	3,048	−0.28%

Source: EHESS and INSEE (1968-2023)

== See also ==
- Communes of the Doubs department
