= Happiness Never Comes Alone =

- Theatrical release poster
- Directed by: James Huth
- Screenplay by: James Huth; Sonja Shillito
- Produced by: Richard Grandpierre
- Starring: Gad Elmaleh; Sophie Marceau; Maurice Barthélemy
- Cinematography: Stéphane Le Parc
- Edited by: Joëlle Hache
- Music by: Elise Luguern
- Production company: Eskwad
- Distributed by: Pathé
- Release date: 27 June 2012
- Running time: 110 minutes
- Country: France
- Language: French
- Budget: €15.7 million
- Box office: $14.5 million

Happiness Never Comes Alone (French: Un bonheur n'arrive jamais seul) is a 2012 French romantic comedy film directed by James Huth and starring Gad Elmaleh, Sophie Marceau, and Maurice Barthélémy. Written by James Huth and Sonja Shillito, the film is about a young jazz musician who enjoys seducing young women. His carefree life of pleasure is interrupted when he meets an older woman with three children, two ex-husbands, and a thriving professional life, and the two, who have nothing in common, become involved in a romantic relationship.

== Plot ==
Sacha (Gad Elmaleh) is a talented jazz pianist who does not take life too seriously. He loves his friends, his piano, and he loves to party. At night, he plays in a jazz club and enjoys seducing pretty young girls. He lives for the moment, looking for pleasure, with no responsibility, no family, and no taxes.

Sacha's carefree life changes suddenly when he meets a forty-something career woman named Charlotte (Sophie Marceau) one rainy afternoon. After they make love, Sacha discovers that Charlotte has three children, not to mention a jealous soon-to-be ex-husband who runs the multinational company they both work for.

Although Charlotte no longer loves her husband, she has a hard time untying the knot because of his wealth and power. Sacha and Charlotte have seemingly nothing in common, but they may just be made for each other.

== Cast ==
- Gad Elmaleh as Sacha
- Sophie Marceau as Charlotte
- Maurice Barthélemy as Laurent
- François Berléand as Alain Posche
- Michaël Abiteboul as Lionel
- Julie-Anne Roth as Chris
- Macha Méril as Fanfan Keller
- François Vincentelli as César
- Timéo Leloup as Léonard
- Milena Chiron as Suzy
- Timothé Gauron as Louis
- Litzi Vezsi as Mamie Matzü
- Cyril Guei as Xavier
- Bérénice Marlohe as Laurent's date

== Production ==
Happiness Never Comes Alone was filmed on location in Paris and New York City. Scenes were shot in Parc Monceau, Paris 8. Principal photography took place from 17 May to 29 July 2011.

== Reception ==
The film received generally positive reviews. In his review in Variety, Boyd van Hoeij called it a "glossy romantic comedy filled with amusing pratfalls and palpable chemistry." Noting that the film explores the problems of beginning a new relationship while raising children, Hoeij goes on to write:

This likable piece of mainstream fluff from Gallic filmmaker James Huth (Brice de Nice), headlined by French stars Sophie Marceau and Gad Elmaleh, has done brisk summer biz in Gaul, where it's closing in on 1.5 million admissions. Squarely aimed at babysitter-requiring auds, this old-Hollywood-style date movie should appeal especially to Euro distribs.

Evoking the classic Hollywood screwball comedies, the film "finds just the right balance between his and her perspectives, while the actors breathe life into their slightly clichéd characters by keeping things low-key and affable, displaying enough chemistry to have auds root for them against all odds."

In her review on the Urban Cinefile website, Louise Keller wrote, "Like a good piece of jazz that surprises by its melodies, harmonies and rhythms, this delectable comedy mixes up music, art, kids and love in surprising juxtapositions, delivering a vibrant splash of life. ... Elmaleh and Marceau carry the film with their style, charisma and chemistry in this feel-good breezy encounter." Also on Urban Cinefile, Andrew L. Urban felt the movie was "blessed with a soundtrack showing impeccable taste" and that the "establishing scenes are the best things about the film, as it shows its heart on its sleeve, turning on the magic realism charm, seducing us with its overt romanticism and letting us feast on two characters falling madly in love."
