= Uncle Albert's Adventures =

- Cover art for the first game
- Genres: Adventure, puzzle
- Developer: Lexis Numérique
- Publisher: Emme Interactive
- Creator: Éric Viennot
- Composers: Jean Pascal Vielfaure; Frédéric Lerner
- Platforms: Windows, Mac

Uncle Albert's Adventures (French: Les Aventures de l’oncle Ernest) is a French series of adventure puzzle video games designed by Éric Viennot, developed by Lexis Numérique and published by Emme Interactive between 1998 and 2004. The first three games have been published in English.

== Plot and gameplay ==
Uncle Albert is known to be an adventurous inventor and traveller, keeping an album of all his discoveries, treasures, and secrets. The album is a travel log and journal full of sketches, living animals, and working mechanisms. The player interacts with the album, using bookmarks to navigate between the pages, and unlocking new pages by solving puzzles.

== Games ==
- 1998: Uncle Albert's Magical Album (original title: L'Album secret de l'oncle Ernest)
- 1999: Uncle Albert's Fabulous Voyage (original title: Le Fabuleux Voyage de l'oncle Ernest)
- 2000: Uncle Albert's Mysterious Island (original title: L'Île mystérieuse de l'oncle Ernest)
- 2003: Le Temple perdu de l'oncle Ernest (not published in English)
- 2004: La Statuette maudite de l'oncle Ernest (not published in English)

=== Spin-off series ===
- 2002: La Boîte à bidules de l'oncle Ernest (not published in English)
- 2003: Le Bidulo Trésor de l'oncle Ernest (not published in English)
- 2004: Big Bang Bidule chez l'oncle Ernest (not published in English)
- 2006: La Boîte à bidules: Mission bidule WX-755 (not published in English)

== Book ==
- 2000: Le Trésor de l'oncle Ernest (not published in English, published in France by Éditions Albin Michel, ISBN 978-2226113566)

== Reception ==
The first three Uncle Albert games were commercially successful. French newspaper Libération reported their combined sales at 500,000 units by October 2002. Magical Album received generally positive reviews from journalists, who praised the graphics, riddles, music, and replay value.
