= Airvault =

- Commune
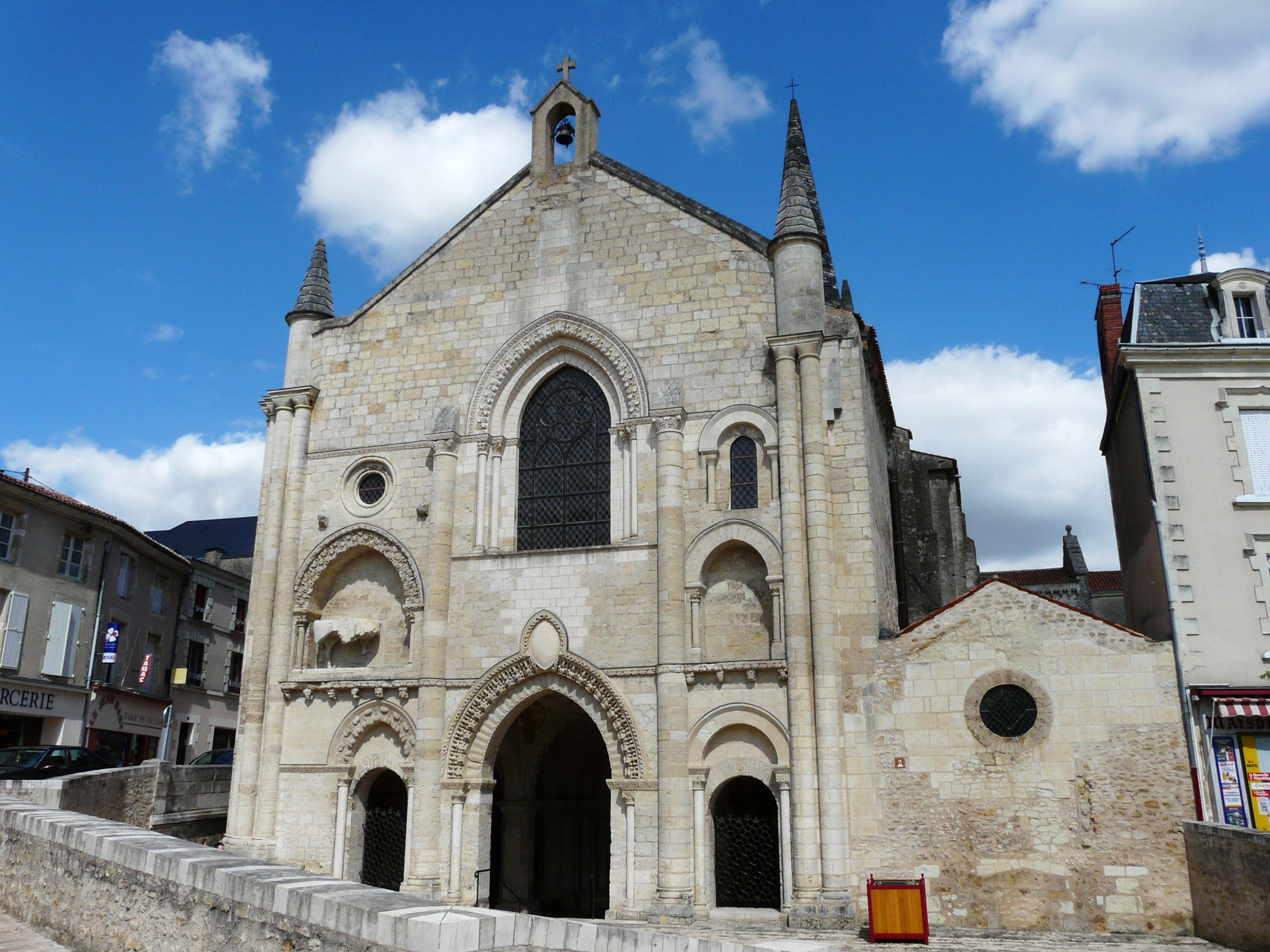
- The church in Airvault

- Coat of arms
- Location of Airvault
- Location within France Location within Nouvelle-Aquitaine
- Coordinates: 46°49′38″N 0°08′11″W
- Country: France
- Region: Nouvelle-Aquitaine
- Department: Deux-Sèvres
- Arrondissement: Parthenay
- Canton: Le Val de Thouet
- Intercommunality: Airvaudais-Val du Thouet

Government
  - Mayor (2020–2026): Olivier Fouillet
- Area^{1}: 63.88 km^{2} (24.66 sq mi)
- Highest elevation: 140 m (460 ft)
- Lowest elevation: 67 m (220 ft)
- Population (2023): 3,306
  - Density: 51.75/km^{2} (134.0/sq mi)
- Time zone: UTC+01:00 (CET)
  - Summer (DST): UTC+02:00 (CEST)
- INSEE/Postal code: 79005 /79600
- ^{1} French Land Register data, which excludes lakes, ponds, glaciers > 1 km^{2} (0.386 sq mi or 247 acres) and river estuaries.

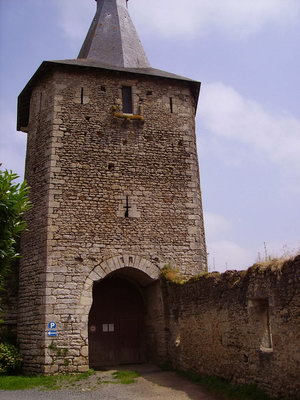
Fortified gate

Airvault (French pronunciation: [ɛʁvo]) is a commune in the Deux-Sèvres department in the Nouvelle-Aquitaine region in western France. It is located on the River Thouet.

In January 1973 Airvault absorbed the former communes Borcq-sur-Airvault, Boussais et Soulièvres. On 1 January 2019, the former commune of Tessonnière was merged into Airvault.

== Population ==
The population data below refer to the commune in its geography as of January 2025. The inhabitants of Airvault are called Airvaudais and Airvaudaises in French.

Historical population
Year	Pop.	±% p.a.
1968	3,616	—
1975	3,741	+0.49%
1982	3,687	−0.21%
1990	3,573	−0.39%
1999	3,386	−0.60%
2007	3,409	+0.08%
2012	3,366	−0.25%
2017	3,281	−0.51%
2023	3,306	+0.13%
Source: INSEE

== Historical sites ==
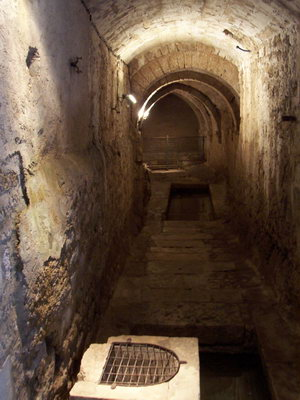
The subterranean fountain

A Romanesque bridge over the Thouet leads into the town. The Saint Pierre church in the center of town was built around 975 AD by Aldéarde, the wife of viscount Herbert I of Thouars. Rebuilt in the 11th and 12th centuries, the church was used as a stop for pilgrims on their way to Santiago de Compostela. An underground fountain is located under the square in front of the church. One block from the church is the abbey, which houses a museum of traditional arts and crafts. In the vicinity of the church, timber-framed houses border narrow medieval streets. A medieval castle, the Château d'Airvault, overlooks the church.

== Trivia ==
François-Marie Arouet might have chosen his pen name, Voltaire, by inverting the syllables of the word “Airvault”. Although this is largely unsubstantiated, one of Voltaire's parents allegedly owned property in the area.

Airvault hosts a yearly didgeridoo, Jew's harp, and overtone singing festival Rêve de l'Aborigène.

== See also ==
- Communes of the Deux-Sèvres department
