= Alberto Laiseca =

Argentine writer and TV host

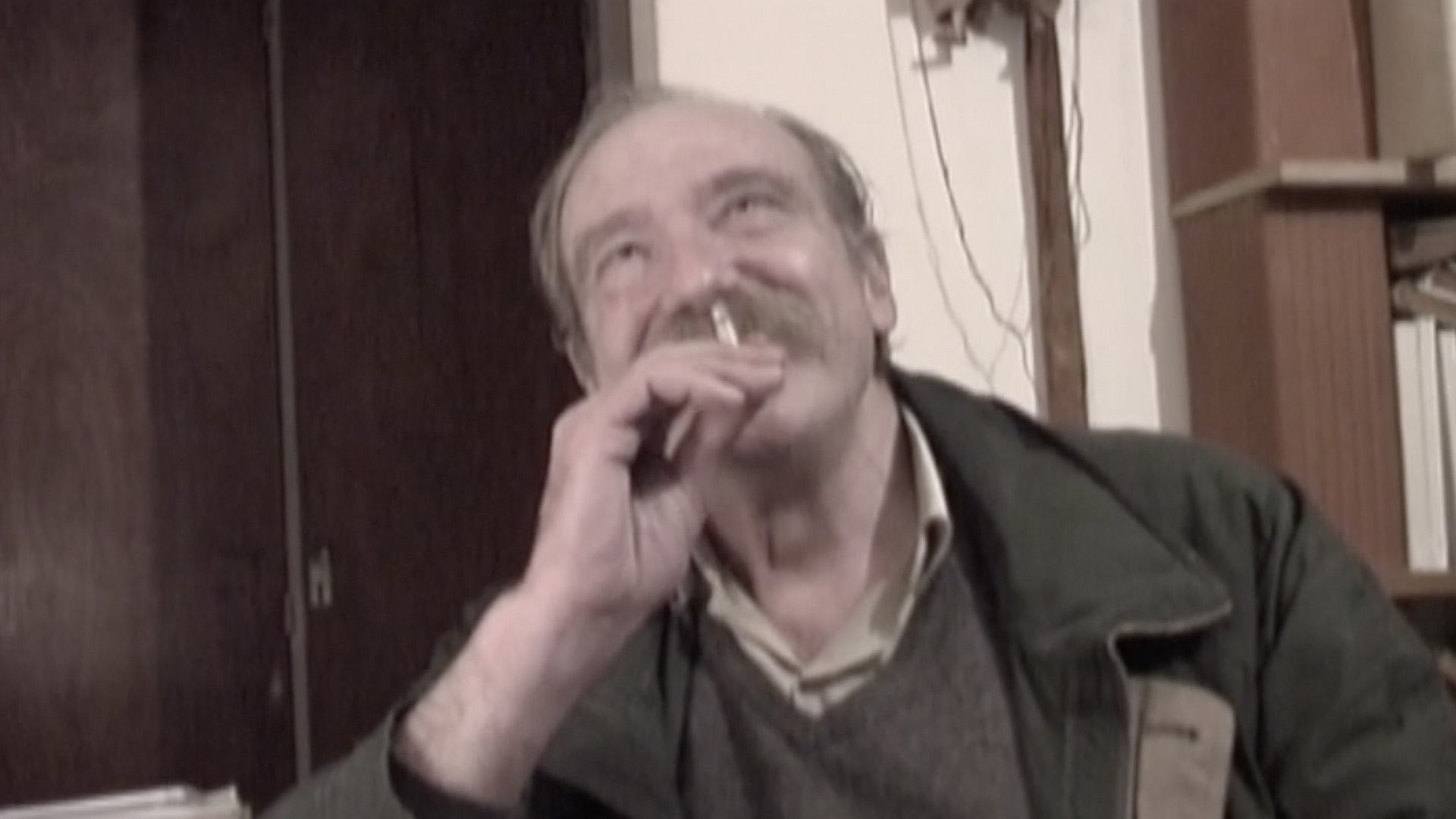
- Laiseca in 2004
- Born: Alberto Jesús Laiseca; 11 February 1941; Rosario, Santa Fe, Argentina
- Died: 22 December 2016 (aged 75); Buenos Aires, Argentina
- Occupations: Writer; actor; television host; poet
- Writing career
- Period: 1976–2016
- Genres: Delirious realism; Horror; Fantasy; Science Fiction; Supernatural fiction; Drama; Essay; Genre fiction; Dark Fantasy; Post-apocalyptic fiction; Poetry; Suspense; Imaginary realism
- Notable works: Su turno para morir (1976); Aventuras de un novelista atonal (1982); El jardín de las máquinas parlantes (1993); Los sorias (1998)

Alberto Jesús Laiseca (11 February 1941 – 22 December 2016) was an Argentine author of horror, supernatural fiction, suspense, science fiction, and fantastic literature. He also worked as a TV host and narrator for horror-related projects. Laiseca is considered as one of the most respected and noteworthy writers of his generation.

== Biography ==
Laiseca was born in Rosario, however, shortly after his birth his family relocated first to Unquillo and later to Camilo Aldao, in the south of Cordoba Province where he lived as a young man until he moved to Santa Fe to pursue a college education. In 1964 he dropped out and went to work as a migrant agricultural worker during the harvests in Mendoza, and in other argentine provinces. Laiseca had a difficult relationship with his father a prominent medical doctor in Camilo Aldao. Laiseca was a chain-smoker.

He is one of the most respected writers of his generation. He published 13 novels and numerous short stories, as well as several essays and non-fiction books. He also published a book of brief poems based on Classical Chinese poetry, Poemas chinos ("Chinese Poetry", 1987). Most of his short stories have been collected in book collections. His monumental novel Los sorias (1998) – which had remained unpublished for twenty years after its completion – is currently considered, due to its extension, as the longest novel in Argentine literature.

He achieved further popularity after appearing as the TV host for the anthology series "Cuentos de terror" (Horror Stories), for the Argentine cable television channel I.Sat. The show consisted of Laiseca narrating -with his own style and words- classical or well-known horror short stories against an empty and dark backdrop, including some of Laiseca's own short stories, such as the famous La cabeza de mi padre ("The Head of My Father"). He later served in a similar capacity as host of the television program "Cine de terror" (Horror Cinema), for Latin American cable television network with classic programming Retro.

== Bibliography ==
- Las aventuras del profesor Eusebio Filigranati (2014)
- Las cuatro torres de babel (2013)
- Cuentos completos (2013)
- Cuentos de terror (2013)
- iluSorias (2013)
- Si, soy mala poeta pero... (2013)
- Gracias Chanchúbelo (2013)
- Beber en rojo (2012)
- El artista (2011)
- En sueños he llorado (2001)
- El gusano máximo de la vida misma (1999)
- Los sorias (1998)
- El jardín de las máquinas parlantes (1993)
- Por favor ¡plágienme! (1991)
- La mujer en la muralla (1990)
- La hija de Kheops (1986)
- Poemas chinos (1987)
- Aventuras de un novelista atonal (1982)
- Matando enanos a garrotazos (1982)
- Su turno para morir (1976)
