= James Huth =

French film director

James Huth (born 29 August 1966 in Sutton, Greater London) is an English-born French film director, screenwriter and producer, mostly known for his collaborations with actor Jean Dujardin.

== Filmography ==
Year	Title	Role	Box office	Notes
1992	Télécommandes	Director & Writer		Short
1993	Big Dream	Director & Writer		Short
1998	Serial Lover	Director & Writer	$1.4 million	Chicago International Film Festival - FIPRESCI Prize - Special Mention; Cinemania Film Festival - Audience Award; Paris Film Festival - Special Jury Prize; Nominated - Paris Film Festival - Grand Prix
2003	Dead End	Producer		
2005	Brice de Nice	Director, Writer & Editor	$33 million	
2007	Hellphone	Director, Writer & Producer	$5.7 million	
2009	Lucky Luke	Director & Writer	$17.6 million	
2012	Happiness Never Comes Alone	Director, Writer & Co-producer	$14.5 million	
2016	Brice 3	Director & Writer	$13.1 million	
