= Josée Dayan =

French film director, screenwriter and producer

- Born: Josée Dagnant; 6 October 1943 (age 83); Toulouse, France
- Occupations: Film director Producer; Screenwriter
- Years active: 1964–present
- Notable credit: Capitaine Marleau

Josée Dayan (born 6 October 1943 in Toulouse, France) is a French film director, screenwriter and producer.

== Life ==
Dayan grew up in Algiers, Algeria, where her father Albert Dagnant, who came from a Jewish family, worked as a television director; her grandmother was the owner of a cinema. Since 1974, she has been mostly active on television. In 1979, she directed a documentary about Simone de Beauvoir appeared.

From the mid-1990s, she directed various high-budget miniseries for French television broadcasters. Her most successful works are the 1998 miniseries The Count of Monte Cristo with Gérard Depardieu in the lead role, and the 2000 mini-series Les Misérables with Depardieu and John Malkovich. She also directed the miniseries Balzac: A Passionate Life (1999), also starring Depardieu, the film Cet amour-là (2001), starring Jeanne Moreau, and the television film Raspoutine (2011), again with Depardieu. A major success was Les Liaisons dangereuses (2003) with Catherine Deneuve, Rupert Everett and Nastassja Kinski in the leading roles.

== Filmography ==
Year	Title	Role	Notes
1964	Le Tigre aime la chair fraiche	Assistant director	Film; Directed by Claude Chabrol
1967	La parisienne	Assistant director	TV film Directed by Jean Kerchbron
1974	De vagues herbes jaunes	Director / Writer	TV film
1975	Au fil des rues... à Gennevilliers	Director	TV film
1975	Monsieur Barnett	Director	TV film
1977	Le naufrage de Monte-Cristo	Director	TV film
1978	Cinéma 16	Director	TV series (2 episodes): La femme rompue (1978); Une fugue à Venise (1981)
1979	Simone de Beauvoir	Director / Writer	Documentary; Directed with Malka Ribowska
1980	L'embrumé	Director / Writer	TV film
1980	Les noces de Figaro	Director	TV film Based on the opera The Marriage of Figaro
1982	Le retour d'Elisabeth Wolff	Director / Writer	TV film
1983	Les Amours romantiques	Director	TV series (1 episode: Les prétendus)
1984	Les amours des années 50	Director	TV series (1 episode: Les autres jours)
1985	Le Deuxième Couteau	Director	TV film
1987	Je tue à la campagne	Director	TV film
1987	Les passions de Céline	Director	TV series (13 episodes)
1988	Le chevalier de Pardaillan	Director	TV series (15 episodes)
1988	Sueurs froides	Director	TV series (2 episodes): La belle ouvrage (1988); Coup de pouce (1988)
1988	Tourbillons	Director	TV miniseries (10 episodes)
1989	Le retour de Lemmy Caution	Director	TV film With Eddie Constantine as Lemmy Caution
1989	Super Polar	Director	TV series (2 episodes): À corps et à cris (1989); La danse du scorpion (1990)
1990	L'ex-femme de ma vie	Director	TV film Written by Josiane Balasko
1990	Le pitre	Director	TV film
1990	Plein fer	Director	Film
1991	Navarro	Director	TV series (2 episodes): Salade russe (1991); Billets de sang (1991)
1991	Coup de foudre	Director	TV series (1 episode: Retour)
1991	Le gang des tractions	Director	TV miniseries (3 episodes): L'homme aux chiens (1991); Dernier round (1991); Saint-Germain (1992)
1992	Police Secrets	Director	TV series (4 episodes): Un flic pourri (1992); Le vin qui tue (1993); Mort d'un gardien de la paix (1994); Les nuiteux (1994)
1992	Jo et Milou	Director	TV film
1992	Hot Chocolate	Director	TV film With American stars (Robert Hays and Bo Derek)
1992	Le JAP, juge d'application des peines	Director	TV series (2 episodes): Les dangers de la liberté (1992); Tirez sur le lampiste (1993)
1993	Julie Lescaut	Director	TV series (7 episodes): Trafics (1993); Ville haute, ville basse (1994); Tableau noir (1994); Ruptures (1994); Crédit revolver (1996); La fête des mères (1996); Le secret des origines (1996)
1994	Le cascadeur	Director	TV series (1 episode: Le saut de la mort)
1994	La guerre des privés	Director	TV series (2 episodes): Deux morts sans ordonnance (1994); Tchao poulet (1994)
1995	Victor et François	Director	TV film Directed with Ruben Goots
1995	L'enfant en héritage	Director	TV film
1995	La Rivière Espérance	Director / Actress	TV miniseries (9 episodes)
1996	Les Liens du coeur	Director	TV film Based on Silas Marner
1996	La passion du docteur Bergh	Director	TV film
1996	L'Enfant du secret	Director	TV film
1997	Les héritiers	Director	TV film
1997	Victor	Director	TV film
1998	The Count of Monte Cristo	Director	TV miniseries (4 episodes); Starring Gérard Depardieu as Edmond Dantès; 7 d'Or - Audience Vote: Best Movie Made for TV
1998	Marc Eliot	Director	TV series (4 episodes): Les deux flics (1998); Le passé d'une femme (1998); C'est pas une façon d'aimer (1999); Les deux frères (1999)
1999	Balzac	Director	TV film Starring Gérard Depardieu as Honoré de Balzac
1999	Les Boeuf-carottes	Director	TV series (2 episodes): Soupçons (1999); Parmi l'élite (2005)
2000	Les Misérables	Director	TV miniseries Starring Gérard Depardieu as Jean Valjean
2001	Zaïde, un petit air de vengeance	Director	TV film
2001	That Love (Cet amour-là)	Director / Writer	Film; Starring Jeanne Moreau as Marguerite Duras
2001	L'Étrange Monsieur Joseph	Director	TV film
2001	Attila	Director	TV film Based on the opera Attila
2001	Un altro mondo è possibile	Support	Documentary
2002	Inside the Actors Studio	Guest Audience	TV series (1 episode)
2003	Les Liaisons dangereuses	Director	TV miniseries Starring Catherine Deneuve, Rupert Everett, Nastassja Kinski and Leelee Sobieski
2003	Les Parents terribles	Director / Producer	TV film Based on the play Les Parents terribles Nominated - Atv Awards - Best TV film
2003	Le génie français	Director	TV series
2004	Milady	Director / Producer	TV film A film about Milady de Winter
2005	Akoibon	Actress	Film; Directed by Édouard Baer
2005	Les Rois maudits	Director	TV miniseries (5 episodes); Nominated - Globes de Cristal Award - Best Television Film or Television Series
2006	La contessa di Castiglione	Director / Writer	TV film A film about Virginia Oldoini, Countess of Castiglione
2008	Diane, femme flic	Director	TV series (1 episode: Deuxième vérité)
2008	Jeanne M. - Côté cour, côté coeur	Director / Producer	Documentary; Directed with Pierre-André Boutang and Annie Chevalley
2008	Collection Fred Vargas	Director / Producer	TV series (4 episodes): Sous les vents de Neptune (2008) based on the novel Wash This Blood Clean from My Hand; L'Homme aux cercles bleus (2009) based on the novel The Chalk Circle Man; L'Homme à l'envers (2009) based on the novel Seeking Whom He May Devour; Un lieu incertain (2010) based on the novel An Uncertain Place
2008	Nous n'irons plus au bois	Director	Documentary
2008	Château en Suède	Director	TV film Based on the play by Françoise Sagan
2008	Marie-Octobre	Director	TV film
2009	Mourir d'aimer	Director / Producer	TV film
2009	Folie douce	Director / Producer / Editor	TV film
2010	Ni reprise, ni échangée	Director / Producer	TV film
2011	Bouquet final	Director / Producer	TV film
2011	La Mauvaise Rencontre	Director / Producer	TV film
2011	Raspoutine	Director	TV film Directed with Irakli Kvirikadze; Starring Gérard Depardieu as Grigori Rasputin
2012	Nos retrouvailles	Director	TV film
2012	La Solitude du pouvoir	Director / Producer	TV film
2013	Le Clan des Lanzac	Director / Producer	TV film
2013	Indiscrétions	Director / Producer	TV film
2014	Capitaine Marleau	Director	TV series (36 episodes): Entre vents et marées (2014); Philippe Muir (2015); Le Domaine des soeurs Meyer (2016); Les Mystères de la foi (2016); Brouillard en thalasso (2016); En trompe-l'oeil (2016); La Nuit de la Lune rousse (2017); À ciel ouvert (2017); Chambre avec vue (2017); La Mémoire enfouie (2017); Sang et lumière (2017); Le Jeune homme et la mort (2018); Double jeu (2018); Les Roseaux noirs (2018); Ne plus mourir jamais (2018); Une voix dans la nuit (2019); Grand huit (2019); Quelques maux d'amour (2019); Pace e Salute (2019); Veuves mais pas trop (2020); L'Arbre aux esclaves (2020); La Reine des glaces (2020); Au nom du fils (2020); La Cité des âmes en peine (2021); Deux vies (2021); L'Homme qui brûle (2021); Claire obscure (2021); Morte saison (2022); Le Prix à payer (2022); La Der des der (2022); Follie's (2023); Héros malgré lui (2023); Grand hôtel (2023); À contre-courant (2023); L'Ami français (2025); La Septième danse (2025)
2015	La Tueuse caméléon	Director / Producer	TV film
2019	House of Cardin	Herself	Documentary
2022	The King's Favorite	Director / Producer	TV film
2023	Adieu Vinyle	Director	TV film
2024	Sur la dalle	Director	TV film
