= Haapsalu Horror and Fantasy Film Festival =

Film festival in Estonia

- Location: Haapsalu, Estonia
- Founded: 2005
- Website: hoff.ee

Haapsalu Horror and Fantasy Film Festival (Estonian: Haapsalu õudus- ja fantaasiafilmide festival; HÕFF) is an international film festival which takes place annually in Haapsalu, Estonia. HÕFF focuses on horror and fantasy films. The festival is organized by the Tallinn Black Nights Film Festival, the Haapsalu Culture Center, and the town of Haapsalu.

The first edition took place in 2005. Since 2012, the festival is a member of Méliès International Festivals Federation.

== Winners ==
The festival awards the following prizes:

=== Audience Award ===
The Audience Award has been given out every year since 2012

Year	Film title	Director
2026	Incomplete Chairs	Kenichi Ugana
2025	Fréwaka	Aislinn Clarke
2024	Chainsaws Were Singing	Sander Maran
2023	Sisu	Jalmari Helander
2022	The Sixth Secret	Mart Sander
2021	Justice 2	Toomas Aria
2020	The Mortuary Collection	Ryan Spindell
2019	One Cut of the Dead	Shinchiro Ueda
2018	Snowflake	Adolfo J. Kolmerer
2017	Bad Black	Nabwana I.G.G.
2016	In Search of the Ultra-Sex	Nicolas & Bruno
2015	The Guest	Adam Wingard
2014	In Order of Disappearance	Hans Petter Moland
2013	Omnivores	Óscar Rojo
2012	Iron Sky	Timo Vuorensola

=== Short Film Méliès d'Argent ===
- 2026 - I Owe You One, directed by Santi Capuz and Diego Jiménez
- 2025 - Atom & Void, directed by Gonçalo Almeida
- 2024 - Wander to Wonder, directed by Nina Gantz
- 2023 - Shut, directed by Niels Bourgonje
- 2022 - Eyes on You, directed by Raoul Kirsima
- 2021 - Hospital Dumpster Divers, directed by Anders Elsrud Hultgreen
- 2020 - Downs of the Dead, directed by Even Husby Grødahl
- 2019 - Bad Hair, directed by Oskar Lehemaa
- 2018 - The Dark Room, directed by Morgane Segaert
- 2017 - Fucking Bunnies, directed by Teemu Niukkanen
- 2016 - The Black Bear, directed by Mèryl Fortunat-Rossi and Xavier Seron
- 2015 - The Salf of the Earth, directed by Jonathan Desoindre
- 2014 - Canis, directed by Marc Riba and Anna Solanas
- 2013 - The Trap, directed by Alberto Lopez

=== Best Estonian Genre Film ===
Year	Film title	Director
2026	Eyes of the Forest	Anna Veisman
2025	Come Sith With Us	Elis Rumma
2025	The Shadow	Jaak Kilmi
2024	Chainsaws Were Singing	Sander Maran
2023	Child Machine	Rain Rannu
2022	Talent	Silver Õun
2021	Kratt	Rasmus Merivoo
2020	Eerie Fairy Tales	Mart Sander

=== Navigator Pirx Award for Best Sci-Fi Film ===
Named after the 1979 Polish-Soviet film Inquest of Pilot Pirx

Year	Film title	Director
2026	Egghead Republic	Pella Kågerman and Hugo Lilja
2025	U Are The Universe	Pavlo Ostrikov
2024	Escape Attempt (short film)	Alex Topaller and Dan Shapiro
2023	Last Sentinel	Tanel Toom
2022	Loop (short film)	Pablo Polledri
2021	The Following Year (short film)	Miguel Campana

== Honours ==
=== HÕFF Lifetime Achievement Award ===
- 2013 - Hideo Nakata
- 2014 - Tobe Hooper
- 2015 - Sven Grünberg
- 2016 - Karel Zeman (posthumous)
- 2018 - The television show Jupiter
- 2019 - Vladimir Tarasov and Priit Vaher
- 2026 - Aldo Tammsaar

=== Award of Recognition ===
- 2020 - Mari Lill - For her work on the Estonian children series The Little Witch
- 2022 - Gülnar Murumägi - For her work as director of the Haapsalu Cultural Centre, the homebase of HÕFF
- 2023 - Eve Kivi - For her work on the Soviet-Finnish Fantasyfilm Sampo
- 2024 - Peeter Volkonski - For his work on the televisionfilm How the King Leaned on the Moon
- 2026 - Päratrust

== See also ==
- List of fantastic and horror film festivals
