= Linh Dan Pham =

Vietnamese-born French actress (born 1974)

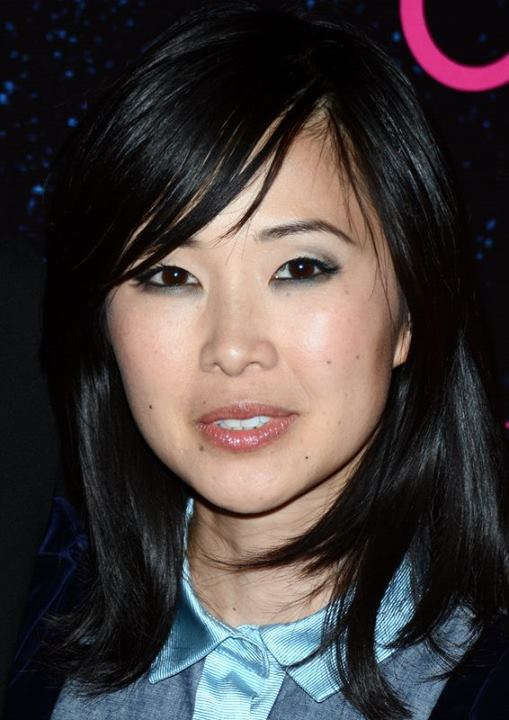
- Pham at the 2013 Cannes Film Festival.
- Born: June 20, 1974 (age 52); Saigon, South Vietnam
- Years active: 1992–present
- Spouse: Andrew Huntley (m. 2000)

Linh Dan Pham (born Phạm Linh Đan, June 20, 1974) is a Vietnamese-French actress.

== Biography ==
She was born in Saigon, South Vietnam, but moved with her family to Paris, France, a year later, just before the capture of Saigon by North Vietnamese and Viet Cong forces. She has also lived in New York, The Hague, Singapore and Vietnam, and now resides in London.

She is known most for her role as an orphan of the Nguyen dynasty adopted by a French plantation owner in the 1992 Oscar-winning French epic Indochine, starring alongside Catherine Deneuve. Pham received a César nomination for most promising actress for that performance.

Despite appearing in a few other productions afterwards, Pham eventually decided to take a decade off from acting, focusing instead on her studies. She studied commerce and worked as a senior marketing manager in Vietnam after graduation.

In 2000, she married Andrew Huntley, a British investment banker whom she had met while they were both living in Ho Chi Minh City.

She began her return to film when she trained in acting at the Lee Strasberg Theatre and Film Institute in New York.

In 2005, Pham made a return to acting with her role in the BAFTA and César winning French film The Beat That My Heart Skipped, opposite Romain Duris, for which she was nominated again for the most promising actress César award (and won). Her lines are spoken in Vietnamese with a Northern accent, and though many people believe she plays a Chinese character because she is introduced by a Chinese musician friend who knows her from Beijing, in fact she plays a Vietnamese who studied music at the conservatory in Beijing. In the film her friend claims that she can speak Chinese, Vietnamese and a little English. In reality Pham speaks French, English and Vietnamese fluently.

In 2005, Pham moved back to Europe to pursue her acting career. Since then she has appeared in lead or supporting roles mostly in films such as Dante 01, Pars vite et reviens tard (Have Mercy on Us All), Mr. Nobody, Le Bruit des Gens Autour, Le bal des actrices and Tout ce qui brille.

She starred in her first Vietnamese production when she appeared as Cam in the 2009 film Adrift ("Chơi vơi") by the director Bui Thac Chuyen, which won the FIPRESCI award at the 66th Venice International Film Festival. The film deals with social and personal issues in modern-day Vietnam, which are not often portrayed in Vietnamese cinema, such as homosexuality and loneliness. In the film Pham speaks in Vietnamese with a fluent Northern accent.

She had a cameo role in the 2010 The Wachowskis produced action thriller Ninja Assassin, playing an assassin sent to kill the film's hero played by the Korean singer Rain.

== Filmography ==
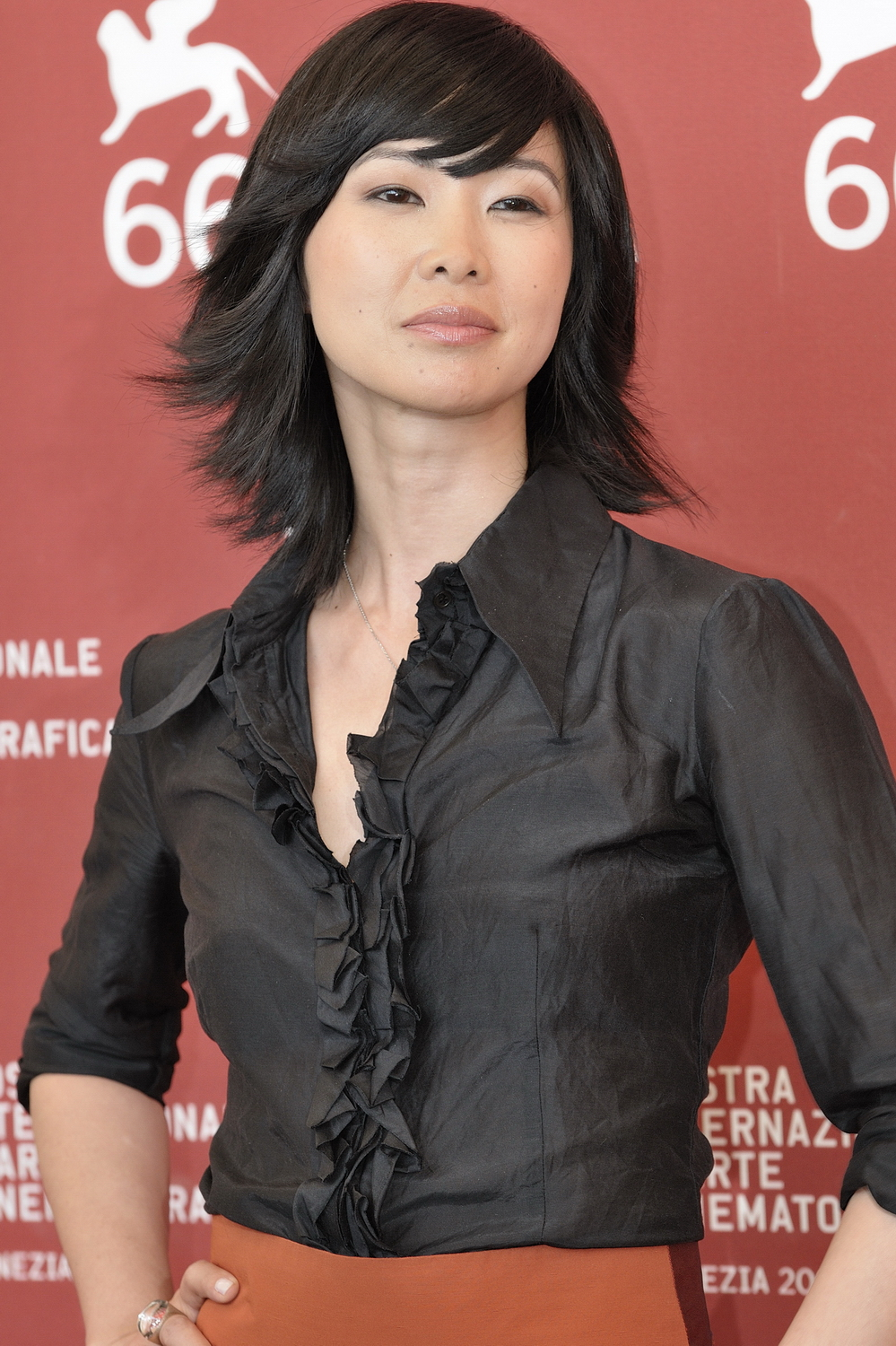
Pham at the premiere of Mr. Nobody at the 66th Venice International Film Festival

Year	Title	Role	Director	Notes
1992	Indochine	Camille	Régis Wargnier	Nominated – César Award for Most Promising Actress
1993	A Ba River Too Far	Nguyen Thi Bich Thuy	Lee Kang-hoon	South Korean TV Series
1994	Lai Daihan (film)	Susan	Seo Yun-mo	South Korean Movie
1994	Jamila	Jamila	Monica Teuber	
2005	Les mauvais joueurs	Lu Ann	Frédéric Balekdjian	
2005	The Beat That My Heart Skipped	Miao Lin	Jacques Audiard	César Award for Most Promising Actress
2006	Les hommes de coeur	Nawin	Édouard Molinaro	TV series (1 episode)
2006	Zoo Doctor: My Mom the Vet	Chea San	Mathias Luther	TV series (1 episode)
2007	Have Mercy on Us All	Camille	Régis Wargnier	
2007	This Life + 10	Me-Linh	Joe Ahearne	TV movie
2008	Dante 01	Elisa	Marc Caro	
2008	Le bruit des gens autour	The spectator	Diastème	
2009	Adrift	Câm	Bui Thac Chuyên	
2009	Mr. Nobody	Jeanne	Jaco Van Dormael	
2009	Ninja Assassin	Pretty Ninja	James McTeigue	
2009	All About Actresses	Herself	Maïwenn	
2009	Pigalle, la nuit	Sinh	Hervé Hadmar	TV mini-series
2010	Tout ce qui brille	Joan	Hervé Mimran & Géraldine Nakache	
2011	De force	Ahn	Frank Henry	
2011	The Shape of Art to Come		Julien Levy	Short
2012	Associés contre le crime	Marie Van Dinh	Pascal Thomas	
2012	Zombie chéri	Aurore	Jérôme Genevray	Short
2013	Les yeux fermés	Claire	Jessica Palud	
2013	The Big Bad Wolf	Lai	Nicolas & Bruno	
2014	Divin Enfant	Marie	Olivier Doran	
2014	Dépareillé		Michaël Pierrard	Short
2014	The Innovators	Mic-Mac	Carmen Chaplin	Short
2014	One Child	Pan Qianyi	John Alexander	TV mini-series
2015	The Very Private Life of Mister Sim	Liam	Michel Leclerc	
2016	Uchronia	The secretary	Christophe Goffette	
2018	Casualty	Anh Tran	Karen Kelly	TV series (1 episode)
2019	Allée des Jasmins	Loan	Stéphane Ly-Cuong	Short
2019	Qu'un sang impur...		Abdel Raouf Dafri	
2020	Faites des gosses	Meï	Philippe Lefebvre	TV series
2021	Blue Bayou	Parker	Justin Chon	

== Theater ==
Year	Title	Author	Director
2018	Certaines n'avaient jamais vu la mer	Julie Otsuka	Richard Brunel
