= Joel Bouraïma =

Franco-American fitness professional

"Coach Joe" Bouraïma
- Born: Joel Bouraïma; October 13, 1980 (age 45); Yvelines, France.
- Occupations: Trainer; Body designer; Coach & Fitness; Entrepreneur

Joel 'Coach Joe' Bouraïma was born and raised in Yvelines, France, a suburb of Paris. After discovering his passion for sports, he decided to study sport and traumatology at Paris Orsay University, one of the most prestigious universities of France. After graduating, he moved to Australia where he was a member of a soccer team. He also began to coach individuals in one-on-one training sessions.

== Career ==
Joël Bouraïma has worked with a number of celebrity clients, including Omar Sy whom he helped train for The Intouchables. Sy won a Cesar award for his role in the movie, dedicating his win to Bouraïma.

Joël Bouraïma was introduced to Kanye West by businessman and collector Steve Guttman, and trained West while he was recording his album Yeezus in Paris. West subsequently invited Joël to train him on tour for the next two years, and to move to Los Angeles. Joël Bouraïma is known for a training technique that combines neuro-linguistic programming and functional training that is tailored specifically to each of his clients, who include high-profile figures such as Kanye West, Kim Kardashian, Khloé Kardashian, Omar Sy, Gad Elmaleh, and Marina Foïs.

== Personal life ==
Joël Bouraima (Coach Joe) moved to Los Angeles in 2015 with his wife and two children.
