= Nicolas & Bruno =

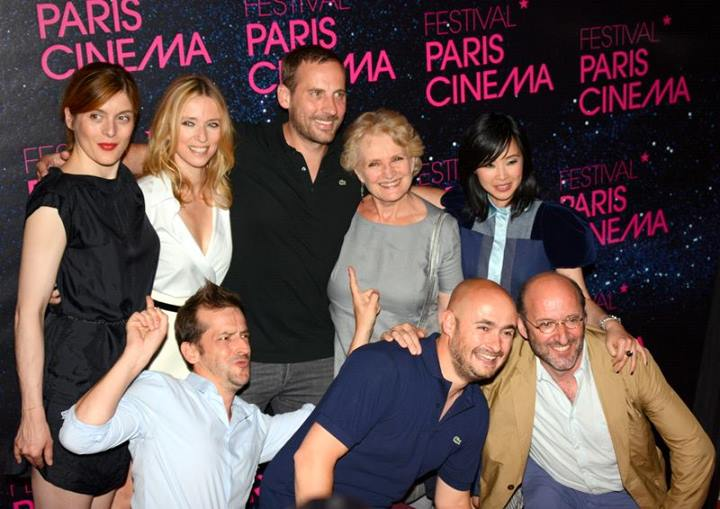
Nicolas Charlet and Bruno Lavaine in the company of their actors at the Parisian Premiere of The Big Bad Wolf

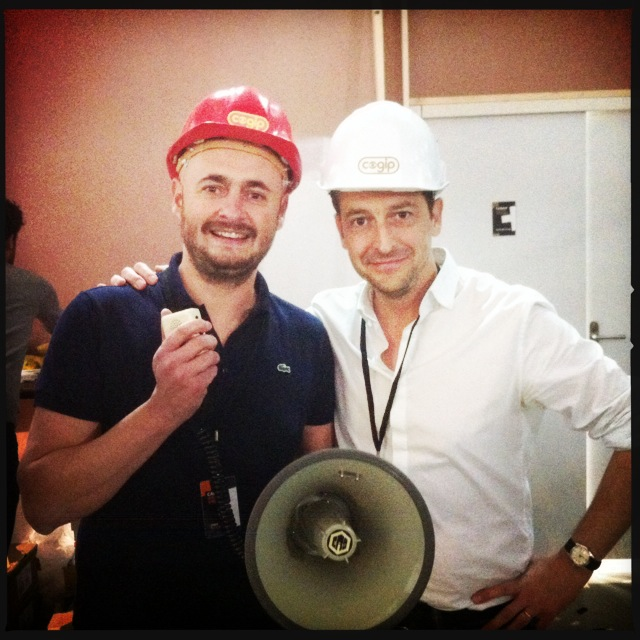
Nicolas & Bruno pose backstage at the Palais de Tokyo for the preview of their film "À la Recherche de l'Ultrasex" screened during the Canal+ channel's 30th anniversary evening.

Nicolas Charlet and Bruno Lavaine, collectively known as Nicolas and Bruno, are a French duo comprising film directors, screenwriters, dialogue writers, and actors. They gained prominence due to their comedic works, such as Message à caractère informatif and In Search Of The Ultra-Sex, as well as feature films Me Two and The Big Bad Wolf. They are known for adapting Frédéric Beigbeder's novel 99 francs into a screenplay starring Jean Dujardin. They wrote and directed the French version of Ricky Gervais' The Office and an original French adaptation of Taika Waititi and Jemaine Clement's What We Do in the Shadows.

== Career ==
In the 1990s, Nicolas and Bruno began writing and directing music videos and commercials, including a commercial for chocolate bar "Daim", which they co-wrote with Frédéric Beigbeder for Young & Rubicam. They then worked with French TV producer Thierry Ardisson who elaborated on the concept and created the design of the TV channel Free One.

In 1997, they created Amour, gloire et débats d'idées, a series of sketches broadcast on Le Vrai Journal of Canal+, in which they overdub the characters of a Venezuelan telenovela comedy's pieces about French current political events.

In September 1998, the first Message à caractère informatif was broadcast on the TV show Nulle part ailleurs of Canal+: a series of 318 sketches, where the two authors-directors overdubbed 1970s executives from real corporate films. It featured Jean-Christian Ranu, Didier Leguélec and other Berthiers, fictional characters of a gray and bureaucratic world, symbolized by their fetish company, the COGIP.

They signed the film adaptation (screenplay and dialogue) of Frédéric Beigbeder's novel 99 francs and directed Le Bureau for Canal+, adapted from the British TV series The Office, starring François Berléand.

In 2007, they wrote and directed their first feature film, Me Two, a comedy starring Daniel Auteuil, Alain Chabat and Marina Foïs, produced by Alain Chabat (Chez Wam, released on June 18, 2008).

In October 2008, they wrote and directed the music-video Figures Imposées for Julien Doré, featuring Catherine Deneuve, Eglantine Rembauville, Clément Sibony and Christian Morin.

In May 2009, they directed a non-profit humanitarian music video to benefit traders: Save The Traders, shot with thirty real traders from international marketplaces.

On July 10, 2013, they released their second feature film as writers and directors. The Big Bad Wolf is a retelling of the traditional tale The Three Little Pigs starring Benoît Poelvoorde, Fred Testot, Kad Merad, Charlotte Le Bon, Valérie Donzelli, Zabou Breitman and Léa Drucker.

On November 4, 2014, as part of its 30th anniversary, Canal+ offered Nicolas & Bruno the opportunity make a feature film about porn, one of the cornerstones of the famous encrypted channel's heyday. In response, the business partners created In Search of The Ultra-Sex, a 62-minute overdubbed match-up movie based on the same principle as Message à caractère informatif. It's a comedy where the two directors perform all voices. Editing and sound effects were produced by Arno Moria and David Frenkel (Synecdoche Films, Paris). The film became successful in France.

On November 6 and 10, 2014, Nicolas & Bruno were invited by the Parisian Modern Art Museum Palais de Tokyo for 2 evenings dedicated to their works. Two screenings of In Search of The Ultra-Sex took place, followed by a master class in front of an audience of 450 people.

On December 11, 2014, the ARP (Actors, Directors, and Producers Corporation), headed by Michel Hazanavicius, organized a special double screening of Michel Hazanavicius's La Classe américaine and a new version of Ultra-Sex for the stage.

In March 2015, the Festival International du Film de Fribourg featured the film in their midnight screenings. Nicolas & Bruno provided additional experiences for the attendees, with the choreography of Daft-Peonk Robot (a character of the film) and a workshop allowing the public to give a try at dubbing scenes from Ultra-Sex. This was the launch of a great tour: the Ultra-Sex-Tour. It was also featured in several other French theaters, such as Lyon (outdoors at Transborder), Amiens, Poitiers, Marseilles, Metz, Montpellier, Villeneuve d'Ascq, Gueret, Lausanne, Avignon, Dunkerque, Toulouse and the Luminor.

On June 5, 2015, an event was organized around the film at the Max Linder Panorama cinema, with animation provided by the two directors, projection of the Message à caractère informatif fake making-of, and dubbing demonstration live by the famous French porn star Tabatha Cash and French actors Patrick Poivey (Bruce Willis), Lionel Henry (Eddie Murphy), Eric Missoffe (Scooby-Doo) and Gilbert Levy (Moe The Simpsons ) in front of 650 people. It was a sold-out event.

In Search Of The Ultra-Sex (subtitled version of A Research of Ultra-Sex) was shown on September 30, 2015 at the Fantastic Fest in Austin (TX) in the United States and on October 3 at the American Cinematheque in the famous Hollywood Grauman's Egyptian Theatre during the Beyond Fest. The film was also selected by the Ithaca International Film Festival of New York, the Grolandais International Film Festival of Toulouse, the Buttocks Film Festival of Paris (as the closing film), the Bordeaux Independent International Film Festival, the Französische Filmtage Tübingen of Stuttgart and the Zinema Zombie Fest of Bogota.

In October 2015, the mythical Parisian theater Studio Galande featured In Search of the Ultra-Sex.

On October 30, 2015, Vampires in Privacy, the French version of Taika Waititi and Jemaine Clement's mockumentary What We Do In The Shadows, was released digitally. The film distributor Wild Bunch gave Nicolas & Bruno carte blanche for the adaptation: a completely rewritten "French Version Originale", both faithful and nuts, for which French actors Alexandre Astier, Fred Testot, Bruno Salomone, Julie Ferrier, Zabou Breitman, and Jeremie Elkaïm join the two dubbers-actors' voices.

== Filmography ==
=== Authors and directors ===
==== Cinema ====
- 2008: Me Two (with Daniel Auteuil, Alain Chabat, Marina Fois)
- 2013: The Big Bad Wolf (with Benoît Poelvoorde, Fred Testot, Kad Merad and Charlotte Le Bon)
- 2015: Vampires in privacy (screenplay and directing of the What We Do In The Shadows French Version, with the voices of Alexandre Astier, Fred Testot, Bruno Salomone, Julie Ferrier, Zabou Breitman, Jeremie Elkaïm and Nicolas & Bruno)
- 2015: In Search of The Ultra-Sex (with the voices of Nicolas & Bruno)

==== Television ====
- 1997- 1998: Amour, gloire et débats d'idées
- 1998 - 2000: Message a Caractère Informatif
- 2002: Restauratec (with Alain Chabat, Gérard Jugnot, Marina Fois and Helena Noguerra)
- 2004: Behind the scenes of Message a Caractère Informatif
- 2006: Le Bureau (French version of Ricky Gervais's The Office)
- 2009: The Night of COGIP
- 2009: The Labor Nowadays: Assessment and Prospects (documentary with Christophe Dejours)
- 2009: Save the Traders (advertising)
- 2014: Message of Pornographic Nature: In Search of Ultra-Sex

==== Music videos ====
- 2008: Figures Imposées (with Julien Doré, Catherine Deneuve, Eglantine Rembauville, Clément Sibony and Christian Morin)
- 2009 Save The Traders

=== Cinema scriptwriters ===
- 2007: 99 francs
- 2008: Me Two
- 2013: The Big Bad Wolf
- 2014: 99 Rubles The Ideal
- 2015: In Search of the Ultra-Sex
- 2015: Vampires in privacy (writing and dialogues of the French version)

=== Voices ===
- 1997- 1998: Amour, gloire et débats d'idées: all characters
- 1998 - 2000: Message a Caractère Informatif: all characters
- 2002: Restauratec: all characters
- 2003: COGIP 2000 Gilles Gaston-Dreyfus: all characters
- 2004: Behind the scenes of Message a Caractère Informatif: all characters
- 2006: Le Bureau (The Office): Journalists
- 2008: Me Two: Jean-Jacques Style, journalist and women's choirs
- 2009: The Night of COGIP
- 2009: The Labor Nowadays: Assessment and Prospects (documentary with Christophe Dejours): journalist
- 2015: Vampires in privacy: Aymeric, Gilles, different voices
- 2015: In Search of the Ultra-Sex: all characters
