= In Search of the Ultra-Sex =

- Poster
- French: À la recherche de l'Ultra-Sex
- Directed by: Nicolas Charlet; Bruno Lavaine
- Screenplay by: Nicolas Charlet; Bruno Lavaine
- Story by: Nicolas Charlet; Bruno Lavaine
- Produced by: David Frenkel; Arno Moria
- Starring: Nicolas Charlet; Bruno Lavaine
- Edited by: Nicolas Charlet; Bruno Lavaine
- Music by: Jean Croc
- Production company: Synecdoche
- Distributed by: Synecdoche
- Release date: 5 June 2015 (Paris)
- Running time: 60 minutes
- Country: France
- Language: French

In Search of the Ultra-Sex (French: À la recherche de l'Ultra-Sex) is a 2015 French comedy film written, directed, edited and overdubbed by Nicolas & Bruno, a comedy duo composed of Nicolas Charlet and Bruno Lavaine.

== Plot ==
A pandemic infects people everywhere with infinite lust, leaving the Galactic Confederation desperately trying to understand the cause behind this. FBI agents Bambi Darling and Stormy Brushing are quick to discover that this pandemic is a direct result of the sexual matrix of the Universe, the Ultra-Sex, being stolen. Meanwhile, starship "4skin 5", which consists of Captain Cock and his crew, are missioned to solve the mystery and save Planet Earth from an endless orgy.

== Cast ==
- Nicolas & Bruno as all characters voices.

== Background ==
In Search of the Ultra-Sex (initially titled Message of Pornographic Nature: In Search of the Ultra-Sex) was a passion project for creators Nicolas Charlet and Bruno Lavaine who, to mark the anniversary of French channel Canal Plus in 2014, delved into the archives to create this cinematographic UFO. It is created from a mash-up of approximately 100 (non-explicit) excerpts from pornography from the 1970s and 1980s, of which they re-dubbed all the characters, both male and female. Renewing the movie-hijacking tradition began with Woody Allen's "What's Up, Tiger Lily?", In Search of Ultra-Sex is an absurd and hallucinatory journey into porn golden-age gems. It is twisted on the same principle as their previous TV show for Canal Plus, Message à Caractère Informatif, in which they used to overdub corporate movies. But the fate of the film went far beyond a special TV broadcast and met an unexpected success in France.

== Release ==
In November 2014, after two screenings of the film at the Museum of Modern Art Palais de Tokyo in Paris, followed up with a master class before an audience of 500 people, the ARP (Actors, Directors and Producers Corporation), headed by Michel Hazanavicius, organizes a double special screening of Michel Hazanavicius's La Classe américaine and a new re-edited and remastered version of the Ultra-Sex for theaters.

On 5 June 2015, an evening event was organized around the film at the Max Linder Panorama cinema, with animation provided by the Nicolas & Bruno and a dubbing demonstration live by the famous French porn star Tabatha Cash and dubbing French actors Patrick Poivey (Bruce Willis), Lionel Henry (Eddy Murphy), Eric Missoffe (Scooby Doo) and Gilbert Levy (Moe, The Simpsons), in front of 650 people. The Max Linder Panorama is sold out.

In France, many theaters request to show the film, many extending it with a choreography of Daft-Peunk Robot (a character of the film) and a workshop where the public can come and try dubbing extracts of the Ultra-Sex.

The film was subsequently screened at venues in several cities, including Lyon, Amiens, Poitiers, Marseille, Metz, Montpellier, Villeneuve-d'Ascq, Guéret, Lausanne, Avignon, Dunkirk, Toulouse, and Paris. At the Luminor in Paris, it was screened every Saturday evening from June 2015.

November 2015, the mythical parisian theater Studio Galande programs In Search of the Ultra-Sex every Friday and Saturday night in residence, just before The Rocky Horror Picture Show, screened there for 35 years. The programmation continued at the Parisian theater Le Luminor Hotel de Ville every Saturday night during summer 2016 and 2017.

It is subtitled in 9 languages: German / English / Spanish / French / Italian / Japanese / Polish / Portuguese / Russian.

In various interviews, Nicolas & Bruno have mentioned that they wish to release an American English dubbed version of the film.

=== Festivals ===
The film had a good reception outside France and was featured in several festivals, including:

- Fantastic Fest of Austin (Texas),
- Beyond Fest of Hollywood at the American Cinematheque,
- Ithaca International Fantastic Film Festival (New York),
- Grolandais International Film Festival of Toulouse
- Buttocks Film Festival of Paris (as closing film)
- Bordeaux Independent International Film Festival
- Französische Filmtage Tübingen of Stuttgart
- Zinema Zombie Fest of Bogotá,
- Offscreen Festival of Brussels,
- Florida Film Festival of Maitland,
- Cinedelphia Film Festival of Philadelphia
- Crossing Europe Film Festival of Linz,
- Slash 1/2 Festival of Vienna,
- Haapsalu Horror and Fantasy Film Festival of Tallinn,
- Bucheon Fantastic International Film Festival of Seoul
- BAFICI of Buenos Aires,
- Fantasia festival of Montreal
- Valletta film festival in Malta
- Sci-Fi London Film Festival.
- My French Film Festival in the "Midnight screenings" category

== Critical response ==
Since its first broadcast on Canal + and its projection at the Palais de Tokyo for the 30th anniversary of the channel, the press has responded positively to this combination of genres, L'Express magazine said: "Through their film, Nicolas & Bruno celebrate not only the porn culture but also that of artistic hijacking".

Libération's Didier Péron stated: "a kitsch and crazy cinematographic hijacking, a sci-fi nutty pastiche". "American actresses hairstyles of the 80s are pornographic in itself, it's another world!" points out Frederic Taddeï who interviewed Nicolas & Bruno on Europe-1 radio station, "It's a tribute to porn American cinema, as did Hazanavicius's The Artist with Hollywood movies". For Le Nouvel Obs magazine, "In search of the ultra-sex is a full of humor jewelry-box filled with sex maniac robots, unusual sex, absurd references and unbelievable blow-dries... go see it!" For his part, Julien Morel of Vice highly recommends the film and explains how "putting a tape into a VCR and talk over it can have a huge humorous reach". An "Unidentified Filmic Object" according to AlloCiné and Mouv' radio, "Nicolas & Bruno turn off the sound and let their delirious imaginations fly... script, dialogues, editing and even over-dubbing, these two guys can do almost everything."

Critics also commented on the programming and success of the film all around France and on the activities that accompanied it. On France-Inter Radio, Rebecca Manzoni stated: "a both fascinating and hilarious undertaking, a singular destiny in the film industry : the movie lives its life in theaters, without any promotion, and owes its success just to the word of mouth." A destiny largely relayed by the most followed bloggers: "A contagious film with hilarious punchlines, a killingly funny showing" acclaims GentleGeek, precising that "sharing and collective experience are part of the success of the film." For the first anniversary of the film, Brigitte Baronnet from AlloCiné salutes its programing in residence at "the mythical parisian movie-theater Studio Galande, just before the eternal Rocky Horror Picture Show."

== Extensions of the film ==
In November 2016, Nova Edition published a "Boovie" (book+movie) "A la Recherche de l'Ultra-sex", 208 pages, limited edition.

Nicolas & Bruno created an "Ultrasex Recipe" in collaboration with French chief Iñaki Aizpitarte and an "Ultrasex Cocktail" with Eric Fossard.

From November 2016 to January 2017, at the Clémentine de la Feronnière Gallery in Paris, the duet presented an unreleased photographic series inspired by one of the characters of the film: "Robot Daft Peunk- First Step on Earth".

The exhibition then started an international tour in Belgium, at the Relief Gallery in Brussels. Then in Namur, August 2017, as part of a Carte Blanche given to the two directors-photographers, at the Festival de l'Intime.
