= Xavier Robic =

French actor

Xavier Robic (born 17 November 1979) is a French actor and an alumnus of Cours Simon, an acting school in Paris, and the Studio Théâtre d'Asnières. He is most known for his role in the French television series, Spiral.

== Filmography ==
Year	Title	Role
2005	Esprit, es-tu là?	Vincent
2008	Persécution	
2008	Paris	Television host
2009	The Villain	The secretary at Korazy
2010	You Will Be My Son	Lacourt's son
2010	Avant l'aube	Arnaud Couvreur
2013	The Big Bad Wolf	Paul
2014	Discount	Le chef de réseau
2014	Lili Rose	Franck
2014	Paris Follies	Policeman
2015	Irréprochable	JP
2026	Women on Trial (L'Affaire Marie-Claire)	Prosecutor

== Television ==
Year	Title	Role
2006	Le Bureau (season 1)	Félix Pradier
2010	Spiral (Season 3, episodes 4, 7, 8, 9, and 11)	Arnaud Ledoré
2013	Antigone 34 (Season 1, episode 2)	Arnaud
2013	La Croisière (Season 1, episode 6)	Fred Parmentier
2014	Hôtel de la plage (Season 1, episodes 1 and 2)	Benjamin Bacci
2015	Hôtel de la plage (Season 2)	Benjamin Bacci
2023	Lupin (Season 3, episodes 1 and 2)	Nicolas Imbert
