= ME2 =

ME2 or ME-2 may refer to:

- ME2 (gene)
- "Me²", an episode of the British sitcom Red Dwarf
- Mass Effect 2, a video game released for Microsoft Windows and Xbox 360 in 2010, and for PlayStation 3 in 2011
- Maine's 2nd congressional district
- U.S. Route 2 in Maine
- Me1 vs Me2 Snooker with Richard Herring
- Me Two, French film

== See also ==
- Me Too (disambiguation)
- MeetU, web collaboration software by PolyCom
- Mewtwo, a Pokémon
