= Eglantine =

Eglantine may refer to:

== People ==
- Fabre d'Églantine (1750–1794), French actor, dramatist, and politician of the French Revolution
- Eglantyne Jebb (1876–1928), British social reformer and founder of the Save the Children charity
- Eglantyne Louisa Jebb (1845–1925), Irish social reformer and mother of Eglantyne Jebb
- Eglantine Rembauville (born 1981), French actress

== Fictional characters ==
- Madame Eglantine, main character from The Prioress's Tale
- Eglantine, from the Guardians of Ga'Hoole series
- Eglantine Price, from the 1971 film Bedknobs and Broomsticks
- Eglantine Took, née Banks, mother of Pippin Took
- Eglantine von Puiset, a character in the Carl Maria von Weber opera Euryanthe
- Eglantine, character from Ascendance of a Bookworm

== Other ==
- "Eglantine" (song), from the 1971 musical film Bedknobs and Broomsticks
- Eglantine rose (Rosa rubiginosa), also "Sweet briar"
- De Egelantier (the Eglantine Rose), a chamber of rhetoric of Medieval and Renaissance Amsterdam
- SS Empire Buffalo, formerly Eglantine, a Design 1105 cargo ship
