= Me Too =

Me Too may refer to:

- #MeToo movement, an international campaign to denounce sexual assault, rape, and harassment.
  - #MeToo movement in China, an offshoot
  - #MeToo movement in India, an offshoot
  - #MeToo movement in Pakistan, an offshoot
  - #MeToo movement in South Korea, an offshoot
- #MeTwo movement, a campaign to bring awareness to individuals of multiple race or national identities.

== Film and television ==
- Me Too! (British TV series)
- MeToo, Now What?, American PBS television series
- Me Too! (Canadian TV series), airing from 2002 to 2006 on CBC Kids
- Я тоже хочу, or Me Too, a 2012 film by Aleksei Balabanov
- MeToo, a defunct brand extension of MeTV by WMEU-CA

== Music ==
- Me Too (album), an album by Farrah
- "Me Too" (Toby Keith song)
- "Me Too" (Meghan Trainor song)
- "Me Too", a song by Jeff Carson, from Jeff Carson
- "Me Too", a song by the Kinleys, from II

== Other uses ==
- USS Me-Too (SP-155), a United States Navy patrol boat
- Me-too drug, a drug containing an active pharmaceutical ingredient that is structurally very similar to another
- Me Too!, a children's book by Mercer Mayer
- Me Too, volume 5 of Donald Jack's series The Bandy Papers
- "Me too" evidence in discrimination lawsuits, such as those discussed in Sprint/United Management Co. v. Mendelsohn

== See also ==
- Me Two, a French film
- ME2 (disambiguation)
- Mewtwo, a Pokémon
