= Seeds of Death (disambiguation) =

Seeds of Death is a 2007 film directed by Régis Wargnier.

Seeds of Death may also refer to:

== Film and television ==
- Seeds of Death: Unveiling the Lies of GMOs, a film by Gary Null
- The Seeds of Death a serial from the Dr. Who series

== Books ==
- The Seeds of Death, a book by Terrance Dicks based on the Dr. Who series # 112
