= The Chalk Circle Man =

1991 novel by Fred Vargas

- First edition (French)
- Author: Fred Vargas
- Original title: L'Homme aux cercles bleus
- Translator: Sian Reynolds
- Language: French
- Series: Commissaire Adamsberg
- Genre: Crime / Thriller
- Publisher: Hermé
- Publication date: 1991
- Publication place: France
- ISBN: 9780143115953
- Followed by: Seeking Whom He May Devour

The Chalk Circle Man (French: L'Homme aux cercles bleus) is a novel by French crime-writer Fred Vargas. The first of her Commissaire Adamsberg series, it was published in 1991. An English translation by Sian Reynolds was published in 2009. Vargas received the 2009 Crime Writers Association International Dagger for this work.

The novel is the first in a series featuring French policeman Commissaire Jean-Baptiste Adamsberg. It describes the background of Adamsberg's move to Paris, the origins of his partnership with Inspector Adrien Danglard, and a glimpse at his elusive relationship with Camille. Much emphasis is placed on the theme of different ways of thinking - contrasting the two policemen's distinct approaches to investigations, and indeed life. There are also a number of typical Vargas elements in the story: a pedestrian's view of the geography of Paris, independent, eccentric but effective older women, a misdirection of the apparently abnormal drawn over the deliberate actions of a killer.

A telefilm of the novel (2009) starred Jean-Hugues Anglade as Adamsberg, Charlotte Rampling as Mathilde Forestier, Jacques Spiesser as Danglard and Jean-Pierre Léaud as Louis le Nermond, and was directed by Josée Dayan.
