= Wash This Blood Clean from My Hand =

Novel by Fred Vargas

- First edition (French)
- Author: Fred Vargas
- Original title: Sous les vents de Neptune
- Translator: Sian Reynolds
- Language: French
- Series: Commissaire Adamsberg
- Genre: Crime novel
- Publisher: Viviane Hamy (French); The Harvill Press (English)
- Publication date: 2004
- Publication place: France
- English publication date: January 2007
- Media type: Print (paperback)
- Pages: 441 pp (French); 388 pp (English)
- ISBN: 2-87858-190-3 (French); ISBN 1-84343-273-0 (English)
- OCLC: 54929205
- LC Class: PQ2682.A725 S68 2004
- Preceded by: Have Mercy on Us All
- Followed by: This Night's Foul Work

Wash This Blood Clean From My Hand (French: Sous les vents de Neptune, lit. "Under Neptune's Winds") is a crime novel by French author Fred Vargas, originally published in France in 2004.

The novel is part of her Commissaire Adamsberg series. As with many of Vargas' novels in English translation, the English title is not a literal translation. It adroitly chooses a quote from Shakespeare's tragedy Macbeth (Act II, Scene ii, 57-8): "Will all great Neptune's ocean wash this blood clean from my hand?".

In 2007 the book won the Crime Writers' Association Duncan Lawrie International Dagger, the second year in a row Vargas won the award (The Three Evangelists having won the previous year). This was the first time an author has been shortlisted for a main CWA Award for three successive novels.

Vargas also won the International Dagger award in 2008, the first time an author won the CWA award for three successive novels.

== Plot ==
Commissaire Jean-Baptiste Adamsberg is a police officer in Paris. His nonchalant behaviour upsets many of his subordinates and chiefs as much as it pleases the others. He often finds key clues in his dreams; yet this will be his undoing soon.

Since before entering the police force, Adamsberg has been looking for a serial killer. That killer's modus operandi involves having a bystander being wrongly accused, which happened to Adamsberg's own brother, and some weapon with three blades, some sort of a trident, hence the Neptune reference.

When the story begins, Adamsberg has found yet another murder he thinks is linked to the "Trident". Nobody believes him because the killer's crime spree is supposed to have lasted more than fifty years, culprits were always found, and Adamsberg's key suspect was buried ten years ago. Adamsberg's dreamlike reasoning sounds unlikely to most.

Adamsberg has no choice but to attend a forensics seminar in Quebec, thus abandoning the case. While in Canada, he bonds with a French girl, who ultimately claims to be pregnant with his child. He then also learns that his previous love has a young child. Both blows lead him to get drunk for the first time in years. When he wakes up, he is covered in blood and his Canadian colleagues accuse him of murdering the girl with a three-bladed weapon.

Female officer Retancourt, the most capable of his subordinates, understands he has been set up, and manages to sneak him back to France. There, as he is hiding in an old lady's house, a senior hacker helps him to track the Trident's various hiding places, thus proving that the suspect cannot be dead. Adamsberg finally manages to uncover the man's history, secret motives, and current location. But the Trident, who is a formidable man, threatens Adamsberg with commanding the death of his child and the latter's mother, if he does not confess to the Canadian murder and commit suicide.

Adamsberg is about to comply when his subordinates intervene.
