= This Night's Foul Work =

2008 crime novel by Fred Vargas

- First English edition
- Author: Fred Vargas
- Original title: Dans les bois éternels
- Translator: Sian Reynolds
- Language: French
- Series: Commissaire Adamsberg
- Genre: Crime novel
- Publisher: Viviane Hamy (French); Harvill Secker (English)
- Publication date: 2006
- Publication place: France
- English publication date: 7 February 2008
- Media type: Print (hardcover)
- Pages: 442 pp (French); 416 pp (English)
- ISBN: 2-87858-233-0 (French); ISBN 1-84655-186-2 (English)
- OCLC: 68990369
- LC Class: PQ2682.A725 D36 2006
- Preceded by: Wash This Blood Clean from My Hand
- Followed by: An Uncertain Place

This Night's Foul Work is a 2008 crime-novel by French author Fred Vargas, an entry in her Commissaire Adamsberg series. The novel is translated into English by Sian Reynolds, translator of Vargas' two previous novels in English, both of which won the Duncan Lawrie International Dagger for best-translated crime novel of the year.

This Night's Foul Work marks the first time Random House have published one of her novels in hardcover. The title comes from a line of impromptu verse spoken by one of the characters.

The book received mixed reviews. Kirkus Reviews gave a negative review of the book, writing that it was "sub-par performance", while Publishers Weekly praised it, calling it "outstanding."
