= Suran Goonatilake =

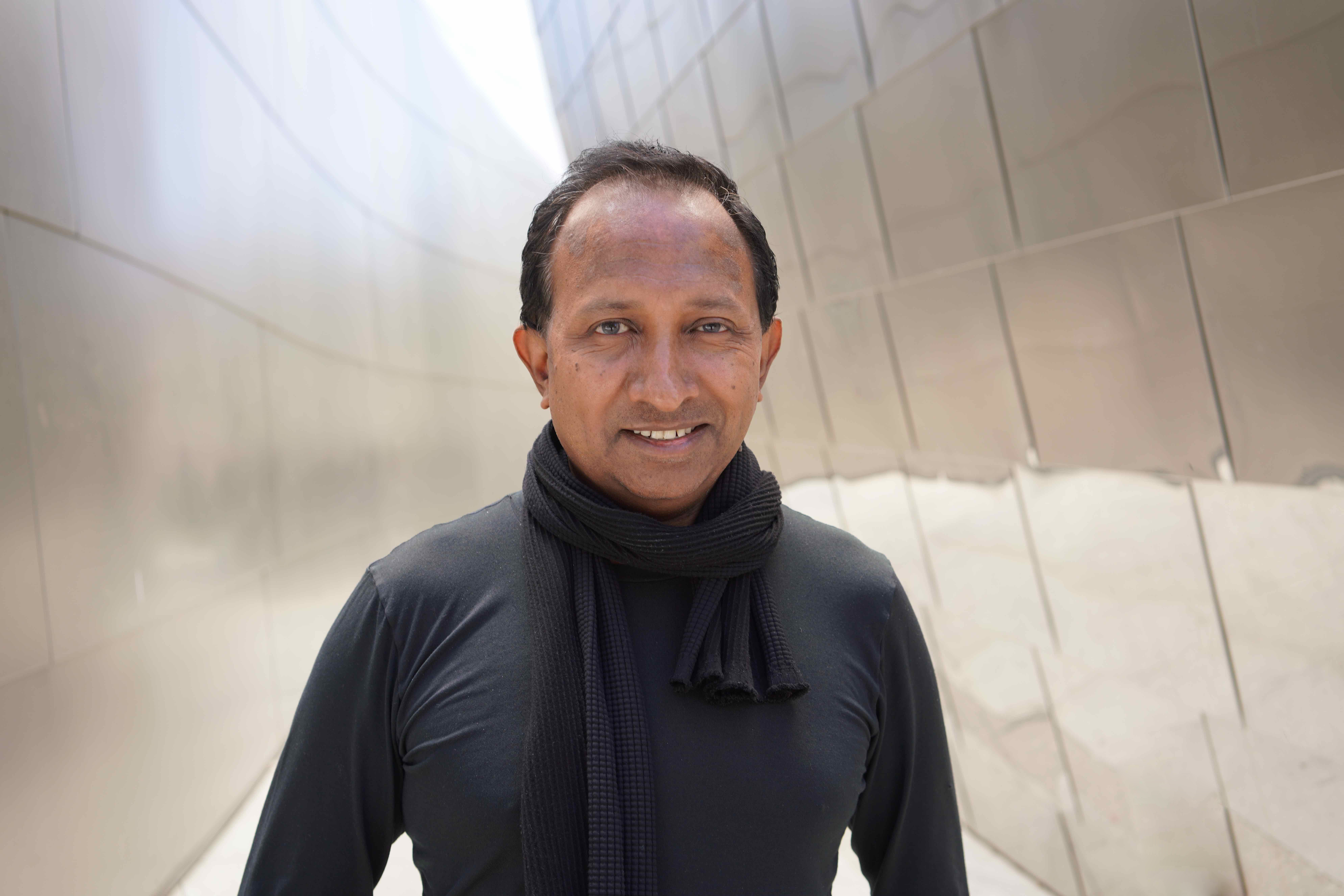
- Born: Colombo, Sri Lanka
- Education: Royal College Colombo; University of Sussex; University College London

Suran Goonatilake, OBE is an academic, entrepreneur and producer. He is a visiting professor at the Department of Computer Science at University College London (UCL).

== Background ==
He did his undergraduate degree at the University of Sussex in Computing and Artificial Intelligence, followed by a PhD at University College London (UCL) in Machine Learning.

As a student at UCL, Goonatilake, co-founded with three fellow students, a Machine Learning company called Searchspace. In May 2005 Searchspace was acquired by Warburg Pincus.

He is the co-founder of several Deep Tech companies, many of which are the result of commercialising research from British Universities

== Entrepreneurship ==
In 2005, he was made an officer of the Order of the British Empire (OBE) in the Queen's birthday honours list, for his services to Entrepreneurship.

== Fashion ==
He founded the Centre for Fashion Enterprise in London a non-profit initiative that finances and nurtures high-growth fashion designers in London. This initiative pioneered a new model of building luxury fashion companies and drew upon practises from technology start-ups, film and music industries. Famous alumni include Erdem Moralıoğlu, Marios Schwab, Mary Katrantzou, Manish Arora, and JW Anderson.

== Film and TV ==
In 2006, Goonatilake was an executive producer on the romantic comedy, Scenes of a Sexual Nature, directed by Ed Blum and starring Ewan McGregor and Tom Hardy. The film was distributed independently via The Really Honest Little Distribution Company and premiered as the closing film to the 2006 London Raindance Film Festival.

In 2007 he was the executive producer for Luxury Unveiled, a documentary TV series on the world's top fashion and luxury brands including Chanel, Tiffany, Dunhill and Cartier.

== Publications ==
Goonatilake is a co-editor of two books,

- Intelligent Systems for Finance and Business John Wiley & Sons 1995 ISBN 978-0471944041
- co-edited with Philip Treleaven Intelligent Hybrid Systems John Wiley & Sons 1995 ISBN 978-0471942429
