= Scenes of a Sexual Nature =

- Poster
- Directed by: Ed Blum
- Written by: Aschlin Ditta
- Produced by: Ed Blum; Suran Goonatilake; Vadim Jean; Amanda Wilkie
- Starring: Adrian Lester; Ewan McGregor; Tom Hardy; Andrew Lincoln; Catherine Tate; Eileen Atkins; Gina McKee; Holly Aird; Hugh Bonneville; Sophie Okonedo; Douglas Hodge
- Cinematography: David Meadows
- Edited by: Joe McNally
- Music by: Dominik Scherrer
- Production company: Tin Pan Films
- Distributed by: Miracle Communications; The Really Honest Little Distribution Company
- Release date: 3 November 2006
- Running time: 91 minutes
- Country: United Kingdom
- Budget: £500,000

Scenes of a Sexual Nature is a 2006 British comedy-drama film directed by Ed Blum and starring an ensemble cast which includes Ewan McGregor, Adrian Lester, Eileen Atkins, Andrew Lincoln, Gina McKee, Sophie Okonedo, and Hugh Bonneville. The film follows a series of seven loosely related stories of couples on Hampstead Heath in north London. The scenes appear out of sequence and jump back and forth between one story and another.

== Plot ==
Jamie and his wife, Molly, are lying on the grass, discussing footballers and multiple orgasms. Molly notices Jamie staring at a pretty girl nearby, Sophie. When he is challenged about it, he pretends he was looking at the book the girl was reading, L'Etranger by Albert Camus. Immediately seeing through his lies, Molly questions Jamie about the book; Jamie claims it is a western about a man who eventually becomes sheriff. To embarrass Jamie and expose him as a liar, she then approaches Sophie to question her about the book as well.

Iris and Eddie, an older couple, meet on a park bench, and start talking about London's skyline and wondering about the couple to whom the bench is dedicated. They discover that they both come to the same bench on different days of the week. They are both widowed. In talking about their past, they also discover that, nearly fifty years before, they had met romantically at that spot and that is why they both kept coming back. They walk off to climb to higher ground, bemoaning the difficulty with climbing hills as they get older. They are bemused by the irony of meeting again, and have mixed feelings as they no longer represent an idealised partner in each other's minds. Eddie talks about seeing each other again, but Iris decides to visit her former husband's grave, now appreciating more their time together. Eddie feeling rebuffed says he will stick to coming to the bench on Thursdays also implying there are other opportunities.

Anna, a disturbed young woman with extreme mood swings, is crying and arguing with her boyfriend Ludo, who eventually walks off, breaking up with her. She is then approached by a young man, Noel, who, in a confused way, asks after her welfare and tries to make her laugh. She asks to be left alone, but he sits next to her and appears to meditate. His weird behaviour interests her and they strike up a conversation, but she becomes annoyed with him. She suddenly orders him to have sex with her right away but subsequently leaves him with his pants around his knees. Noel re-appears in the film several times as he chances upon other characters.

Gay life-partners Billy and Brian are also lying on the grass, discussing other gay men and The Good Life. Billy has trouble giving up casual sex with other men, while Brian wants him to be faithful to him. They later talk about adopting children, which Billy wants but Brian doesn't. Billy promises to give up casual sex when the two adopt children, which convinces Brian to think about it. However, seconds later Billy runs off in pursuit of an attractive man who passed them.

Peter Brian Maxwell and Sara Louise Williams meet on a different bench. It transpires that they have just divorced amicably and have a seven-year-old daughter, Eve. However, they have mixed feelings about this because they still love each other and finally decide divorcing was the best thing.

Louis meets Esther and discusses Louis' father's funeral. Louis presents Esther with tickets for a holiday in Barbados. They discuss a variety of issues like a traditional couple, but in the end it transpires that Esther is an escort and is paid for her time with Louis but never had sex with him stating that was never the arrangement.

Gerry and Julia sit on a rug enjoying some red wine and cheese. They stumble over modern terminology for ethnic minorities and not being, or appearing to be, racist. They talk about former relationships and children and, as they are both in their early forties, Julia worries that she will no longer be able. The two are on a blind date together – Julia's first. They seem to be getting along well until Julia's attention is briefly drawn towards Louis, who comes in her line of sight. Insulted by this, Gerry decides to leave abruptly.

== Cast ==
- Andrew Lincoln as Jamie
- Holly Aird as Molly
- Eglantine Rembauville as Sophie
- Eileen Atkins as Iris
- Benjamin Whitrow as Eddie
- Sophie Okonedo as Anna
- Nick Sidi as Ludo
- Ewan McGregor as Billy
- Tom Hardy as Noel
- Douglas Hodge as Brian
- Adrian Lester as Pete
- Catherine Tate as Sara
- Elle Mckenzie as Eve
- Mark Strong as Louis
- Polly Walker as Esther
- Hugh Bonneville as Gerry
- Gina McKee as Julia

== Production ==
Tom Hardy was the only cast member who had to audition at that time, and he was cast after only a 30-second audition. Said Ed Blum, "He had to read from the script, the character, and so there wasn’t any improvisation or anything like that, it was just a straight read. He’d really done his homework. He had created a character in his mind."

Scenes of a Sexual Nature was filmed on a minimal budget (estimated at £500,000) and the actors were offered Equity minimum and a percentage of profits as their salary. The filmmakers presented the project to investors a mere two weeks before shooting began, at which point the actors had already signed on. To increase the budget, Blum re-mortgaged his flat.

== Reception ==
=== Release ===
The film opened in niche cinemas in the UK on 3 November 2006, earning about US$100,000 in its first weekend.

=== Critical response ===
Scenes of a Sexual Nature has a 50% rating on Rotten Tomatoes based on 6 critics' reviews. The BBC gave it 3 stars out of 5, saying it had a "beautiful backdrop and pleasant nuances". Empire magazine gave it 2 stars, saying it was "good in patches but insubstantial, the only discernible moral is that Hampstead Heath is a nice place to be on a sunny day". Other critics noted that despite the film's title and the fact all of the couples' storylines revolve around sex, there is actually very little sex in the film.

In 2006, the film was nominated for a British Independent Film Raindance Award, an award in recognition of first-time filmmakers.

In a retrospective review for The Guardian in 2020, Leslie Felperin wrote that while some of the comic subplots did not age well, more dramatic storylines such as the one involving the blind date and the gay couple manage "to achieve a Goldilocks balance between sweet, sad and sour." Felperin concluded the film "[shows] how much tonalities and expectations for British drama and comedy have changed since the mid noughties."
