= Raspoutine (2011 film) =

- Written by: Philippe Besson; Vincent Fargeat
- Directed by: Josée Dayan
- Starring: Gérard Depardieu; Fanny Ardant
- Music by: Stéphane Gaubert; Frederick Duni
- Countries of origin: Russia; France
- Original languages: Russian; French

Production
- Producers: Arno Frilli; Anastasia Kovtun; Svetlana Slityuk
- Cinematography: Ennio Guarnieri
- Running time: 105 min.
- Production companies: Mosfilm; France Televisions

Original release
- Release: December 2011

Raspoutine (Russian: Распутин, romanized: Rasputin) is a 2011 French-Russian historical drama television film directed by Josée Dayan and starring Gérard Depardieu, Fanny Ardant, Vladimir Mashkov and Anna Mikhalkova. It centers on the last year in the life of the Russian historical figure Grigori Rasputin.

== Plot ==
Following the First World War and experiencing social and political instability, the Russian Empire slowly moves toward its collapse. A number of aristocrats and members of royal family conclude that the only way to save the country is to expel the famous seer and healer Grigori Rasputin from St. Petersburg. Though he has no formal titles, Rasputin is close with the Emperor and his wife, possessing considerable influence on them.

Princess Zinaida Yusupova tries to explain to Empress Alexandra Feodorovna the harmfulness of her friendship with Rasputin, trying to prove that Rasputin terribly discredits not only the entire royal power, but also the Empress personally. Rasputin, however, regularly cures the only son of the Empress from attacks of haemophilia, and therefore Alexandra never drives out "the holy elder". Seeing that her entreaties are useless, Princess Yusupova decides to act alone. She persuades her son Felix to organize a plot to murder Rasputin.

== Cast ==
- Gérard Depardieu – Grigori Rasputin (Russian voice by Sergei Garmash)
- Fanny Ardant – Russian Empress Alexandra Feodorovna (Russian voice by Marina Neyolova)
- Vladimir Mashkov – Russian Emperor Nicholas II of Russia
- Anna Mikhalkova – Anna Vyrubova
- Irina Alfyorova – Zinaida Yusupova
- Filipp Yankovsky – Felix Yusupov
- Natalya Shvets – Irina Yusupova
- Leonid Mozgovoy – Makary the priest
- Danila Kozlovsky – Grand Duke Dmitri Pavlovich of Russia
- Konstantin Khabensky – Aron Simanovich, Rasputin's personal secretary
- Kseniya Rappoport – Maria ("Munya") Golovina, Rasputin's votaress and secretary
- Yuliya Snigir – Dora
- Yuri Kolokolnikov – Oswald Rayner
- Igor Sergeyev – Vladimir Purishkevich
- Sergey Zamorev – Boris Stürmer
- Ernst Romanov – George Buchanan
- Petr Gavrilyuk – Eugene Botkin
- Tamara Kolesnikova – Dowager Russian Empress Maria Feodorovna
- Victor Kostetskiy – archimandrite
- Alexander Ryazantsev – Russian Grand Duke Nikolai Nikolaevich

== Production ==
The main shooting for the film took place in Russia, particularly in Saint Petersburg (Smolny Convent and Moika Palace), Pushkin (Catherine Palace and the Alexander Palace. Some scenes of the film were shot in Marseille.

According to Gérard Depardieu, some changes to the film's script were made personally by Vladimir Putin.
