= Le Bureau =

French adaptation of The Office sitcom

- The cast of Le Bureau
- Genre: Comedy
- Created by: Ricky Gervais; Stephen Merchant
- Directed by: Nicolas Charlet
- Starring: François Berléand; Xavier Robic; Benoît Carré; Jérémie Elkaïm; Alka-Laure Balbir; Frédéric Merlo; Jean-Pierre Loustau; Astrid Bas; Solène Bouton; Jacques-Yves Dorges
- Country of origin: France
- Original language: French
- No. of seasons: 1
- No. of episodes: 6

Production
- Running time: 26 minutes
- Production companies: Capital United Nations Entertainment; The Identity Company

Original release
- Network: Canal+
- Release: 25 May – 30 June 2006

Le Bureau is a 2006 French television show written and directed by Nicolas & Bruno. It is a French adaptation of the popular British television series The Office. Le Bureau adapted the scripts of the original British series, changing character names and many cultural references.

== Cast ==
- François Berléand: Gilles Triquet, Regional Director of the Cogirep Villepinte branch. He is based on David Brent.
- Xavier Robic: Félix Pradier, trainee.
- Benoît Carré: Joel Liotard, Assistant to the Regional Director.
- Jérémie Elkaïm: Paul Delorme, Sales Representative.
- Alka-Laure Balbir: Laetitia Kadiri, Receptionist.
- Frédéric Merlo: Daniel Gabarda, Chief Accountant.
- Jean-Pierre Loustau: Didier Leguélec, Representative.
- Astrid Bas: Juliette Lebrac, Manager of Cogirep France.
- Solène Bouton: Jennifer Langlois.
- Jacques-Yves Dorges as Giraud Bernard, Sales Representative.

== Summary ==
It takes place in Villepinte, a business park in the northeast suburbs of Paris.

The series stars François Berléand as Gilles Triquet, France's version of David Brent. Another notable actor, Jérémie Elkaïm of Presque rien fame, also stars in the series playing the French version of Tim Canterbury.

Filming with the French cast was completed in early February; the series began airing on 25 May 2006.

It is the first foreign-language remake of the show, although the German series Stromberg used The Office as a basis for its show format. A dubbed version of the first UK series that ran on cable in France in 2004 fared poorly.

== Season schedule ==
Episode Number	Canal+	Canal+ Décalé
Episode 1	25 May 2006 10:15	25 May 2006 10:40
Episode 2	1 June 2006 10:25	3 June 2006 8:15
Episode 3	8 June 2006 10:55	10 June 2006 8:10
Episode 4	22 June 2006 10:15	24 June 2006 8:15
Episodes 5 – 6	30 June 2006 10:15	

== Home release ==
The DVD was released on 28 August 2006.

== See also ==
- The Office
- List of French adaptations of television series from other countries
