= The Big Bad Wolf (2013 film) =

2013 film by Nicolas Charlet

- French-language poster
- French: Le Grand méchant loup
- Directed by: Nicolas & Bruno
- Written by: Nicolas Charlet; Bruno Lavaine
- Produced by: Éric and Nicolas Altmayer
- Starring: Benoît Poelvoorde; Kad Merad; Fred Testot; Valérie Donzelli; Charlotte Le Bon; Zabou Breitman; Cristiana Reali; Léa Drucker; Linh Dan Pham
- Cinematography: Laurent Dailland
- Edited by: Reynald Bertrand
- Music by: Éric Neveux
- Production company: Mandarin Films
- Distributed by: Mars Distribution; Frenetic Films
- Release date: 10 July 2013 (France)
- Running time: 107 minutes
- Country: France
- Language: French
- Budget: $11.2 million
- Box office: $3.1 million

The Big Bad Wolf (French: Le Grand méchant loup) is a 2013 French comedy film directed by Nicolas Charlet and Bruno Lavaine. A remake of the 2007 Canadian film The 3 L'il Pigs (Les 3 p'tits cochons), the film centres on three brothers living in Versailles who react to the terminal illness of their mother by having extramarital affairs.

== Cast ==
- Benoît Poelvoorde as Philippe Delcroix
- Kad Merad as Louis Delcroix
- Fred Testot as Henri Delcroix
- Valérie Donzelli as Nathalie Delcroix
- Charlotte Le Bon as Natacha
- Zabou Breitman as Victoire Delcroix
- Cristiana Reali as Eléonore de Saint-André
- Léa Drucker as Patricia Delcroix
- Linh Dan Pham as Lai
- Marie-Christine Barrault as Madame Delcroix
- Denis Podalydès as Doctor Stanislas de Lastic
