= Seeking Whom He May Devour =

1999 novel by Fred Vargas

- First edition (French)
- Author: Fred Vargas
- Original title: L’Homme à l’envers
- Translator: David Bellos
- Language: French
- Series: Commissaire Adamsberg
- Genre: Crime novel
- Publisher: Viviane Hamy (French); Harvill Secker (English)
- Publication date: 1999
- Publication place: France
- English publication date: 28 October 2004
- Media type: Print (hardback & paperback)
- Pages: 300 pp
- ISBN: 2-87858-107-5 (French); ISBN 1-84343-090-8 (English)
- OCLC: 41505648
- LC Class: PQ2682.A725 H63 1999
- Preceded by: The Chalk Circle Man
- Followed by: Have Mercy on Us All

Seeking Whom He May Devour (French: L’Homme à l’envers, lit. "The Inside-out Man") is a crime novel by French writer Fred Vargas.

== Name ==
As with many of Vargas' novels in English translation, the English title bears no relationship to the original. In this case, it is a biblical quotation from the First Epistle of Peter (5:8): Be sober, be vigilant; because your adversary the devil, as a roaring lion, walketh about, seeking whom he may devour. The French title is more apposite, referring to an aspect of the werewolf myth that plays some part in the story, that the werewolf when in human form is wearing the wolfskin inside out. An alleged werewolf may therefore be exposed by cutting (generally fatally), when wolf-hair will be seen in the wound.

== Recognition ==
In 2004, it became the second of her novels to be translated into English (by award-winning translator David Bellos), and was shortlisted for the Crime Writers' Association Gold Dagger.

== Reception ==
A reviewer for Publishers Weekly wrote: "the unusual cast of characters and off-beat humor should help Vargas win new fans."

While Kirkus Reviews commended the author for creating "a notably intriguing policeman in Adamsberg ... whose story this time draws you in and keeps you guessing until the dazzling dénouement."
