= Snowflake (2017 film) =

2017 film

- Film poster
- Directed by: Adolfo Kolmerer
- Starring: Reza Brojerdi; Erkan Acar
- Release date: 14 September 2017
- Running time: 121 minutes
- Country: Germany
- Language: German

Snowflake (German: Schneeflöckchen) is a 2017 German action film directed by Adolfo Kolmerer.

== Cast ==
- Erkan Acar as Tan
- Reza Brojerdi as Javid
- Xenia Georgia Assenza as Eliana
- Gedeon Burkhard as Winter
- Adrian Topol as Bolek
- Mehmet Kurtuluş as Feuer
- Mathis Landwehr as Hyper Electro Man
