= Have Mercy on Us All (film) =

- Film poster
- Directed by: Régis Wargnier
- Written by: Régis Wargnier; Ariane Fert; Harriet Marin; Julien Rappeneau; Lawrence Shore
- Based on: Have Mercy on Us All by Fred Vargas
- Produced by: Cyril Colbeau-Justin; Jean-Baptiste Dupont; Grégory Barrey; Nina Heyns
- Starring: José Garcia
- Cinematography: Laurent Dailland
- Edited by: Yann Malcor
- Music by: Patrick Doyle
- Production company: Gaumont
- Distributed by: Gaumont Columbia TriStar Films
- Release date: 24 January 2007
- Running time: 116 minutes
- Country: France
- Language: French
- Budget: $18.2 million
- Box office: $6.2 million

Have Mercy on Us All a.k.a. Seeds of Death (original French title: Pars vite et reviens tard, lit. "Leave quickly and come back late") is a 2007 film about the return of the Plague to modern Paris, directed by Régis Wargnier and based on the 2003 novel by Fred Vargas.

It was released in France on January 24, 2007.

== Plot ==
The action takes place in what is now Paris. A mysterious stranger predicts the outbreak of the plague. Several citizens complain because a mirror-inverted 4, visible from afar, was painted on their door. Commissioner Adamsberg worked on the cases and made the acquaintance of the retired historian Hervé Decambrais, who helped interpret the symbol.

The prophecy seems to come true. The first corpse with black marks on the skin is soon found. The plague is also called "The Black Death". The young man lived behind an apartment door without the horror symbol. It quickly becomes clear why. The mirror-inverted 4 was used in the Middle Ages to protect against the deadly infectious disease. At the same time, a public reader regularly receives mysterious messages which Hervé interprets as announcements of a plague epidemic. The sign on the doors is always provided with CLT, an archaeologist interviewed by Adamsberg recognizes this abbreviation and identifies it as cito longe tarde, in Latin "flee quickly and far and do not return too soon".

Adamsberg's colleague is bitten by fleas found in an envelope in the dead man's apartment. While the laboratory analysis of these parasites is in progress - cultivation takes six days - more and more victims are found. But then the laboratory doctor can refute the suspicion of plague. Curare, an arrow poison, paralyzed the diaphragm and lungs of the victims in a matter of seconds. All corpses had a puncture site in the neck.

The police investigations are now so advanced that a biographical connection between the victims - so far there are five - has been found. They all worked for a pharmaceutical company in the Congo at the same time. The list of employees includes another French. Roubaud, the last survivor, reports to the investigating police officers how he and his colleagues at the time killed the head of the pharmaceutical company because he discovered their rampant drug business in the Congo.

François Heller-Devile left a son. This - now grown up to a young man - is suspected of avenging the death of his father together with his grandmother Clémentine. As a 12-year-old, Damas watched the murder disguised as an accident. According to her psychotic belief, Clémentine breeds rats in her basement that are infected with the plague. She is obsessed with the subject of "plague". She had sent the rodent fleas in envelopes to the six murderers of her son. Damas, who has also had psychological problems since his father's death, marked the doors of those who were not to be attacked by the pathogen at night, i.e. the neighbors of the later victims. In fact, the two of them by no means spread the plague.

Damas ’half-sister Marie is the real murderer. She knew Damas' desire for revenge and injected the victims with the poison. She used charcoal to draw black spots on the victims' skin to simulate plague as the cause of death. Bitter about her fate - unloved and rejected by her father - she sought after her father's fortune, which now belongs to Damas. Clémentine is admitted to psychiatry, Damas receives a 5-year prison sentence.

== Cast ==
- José Garcia - Chief Inspector Jean-Baptiste Adamsberg
- Marie Gillain - Marie
- Lucas Belvaux - Danglard
- Olivier Gourmet - Joss Le Guern
- Philippe Bas - Maurel
- Nicolas Cazalé - Damas
- Linh Dan Pham - Camille
- Michel Serrault - Hervé Decambrais/Hervé Ducouëdic
- Grégory Gadebois - Bordenave
- Frédéric Jardin - François Heller-Devile
