= An Uncertain Place =

2008 novel by Fred Vargas

- First edition
- Author: Fred Vargas
- Original title: Un lieu incertain
- Translator: Sian Reynolds
- Language: French
- Series: Commissaire Adamsberg
- Genre: Crime novel
- Publisher: Éditions Viviane Hamy
- Publication date: 2008
- Publication place: France
- English publication date: 2011
- Pages: 384
- ISBN: 9782878582857
- Preceded by: This Night's Foul Work

An Uncertain Place (French: Un lieu incertain) is a 2008 crime novel by the French writer Fred Vargas.

== Reception ==
Christian House of The Independent wrote: "It is a highly entertaining policier but more importantly, as with Conan Doyle, the wacky world Vargas shapes is oddly reassuring: a great remedy to a grey day."

== See also ==
- 2008 in literature
- Contemporary French literature
