= The Three Evangelists =

1995 novel by Fred Vargas

- First edition (French)−
- Author: Fred Vargas
- Original title: Debout les Morts
- Translator: Sian Reynolds
- Language: French
- Genre: Crime / Thriller
- Publisher: Viviane Hamy
- Publication date: 1995
- Publication place: France
- English publication date: 5 January 2006
- Media type: Print (Hardcover, Paperback)
- Pages: 240
- ISBN: 1-84343-089-4
- OCLC: 62133338
- Dewey Decimal: 843.914 22
- LC Class: PQ2682.A725 D4313 2006

The Three Evangelists (French: Debout les Morts) is a 1995 novel by French author Fred Vargas, translated into English in 2006. It won the inaugural Crime Writers' Association's Duncan Lawrie International Dagger, now known as the International Dagger Award.

== Plot ==
The "Three Evangelists" of the title—Marc Vandoosler, Mathias Dellamarre, and Lucien Devernois—along with Marc's uncle, the disgraced former police commissioner Armand Vandoosler, appear for the first time in this novel. The Three Evangelists are historians: Marc studies the Middle Ages; Matthias is a historian of prehistoric man; and Lucien is a historian of World War I. They are down on their luck, and decide to move into an old house, next door to the retired opera singer Sophia Siméonidis.

One morning, Sophia discovers a beech tree in her garden that she has never seen before. She is alarmed, but her husband, Pierre, is indifferent. Eventually she asks the Three Evangelists to dig up the tree; they do so but find nothing underneath it.

Sophia disappears. Pierre is unconcerned, believing that she has gone to visit her former Greek lover, Stelyos. But Juliette, the Evangelists' other next door neighbour, expresses concern; she is sure that Sophia, her best friend, would never have left without telling her, especially not on a Thursday evening, when all of the neighbours regularly meet for a convivial meal at Juliette's restaurant, Le Tonneau (The Barrel).

One night, Sophia's niece, Alexandra, arrives with her young son, Cyrille, having run away from a failed relationship and expecting to stay with Sophia. Shortly afterwards, a burnt-out car containing a corpse is discovered in the yard of an abandoned factory. The body is unidentifiable, but Sophia's lucky charm is found. Alexandra has no alibi; she stands to inherit a third of Sophia's substantial fortune, and her habit of driving aimlessly at night makes her a principal suspect.

Already troubled by the mystery of the tree, and increasingly desperate to divert the attention of the police from Alexandra, the Three Evangelists and Armand Vandoosler begin to investigate, exploiting Armand's contacts with his former colleagues.

== Release details ==
- 2006, Canada, Vintage Canada ISBN 0-676-97797-9, 2006, Paperback
- 1995, France, V. Hamy ISBN 2-87858-068-0, 1995, Unknown binding
