= Fred Vargas =

French writer (born 1957)

Frédérique Audouin-Rouzeau
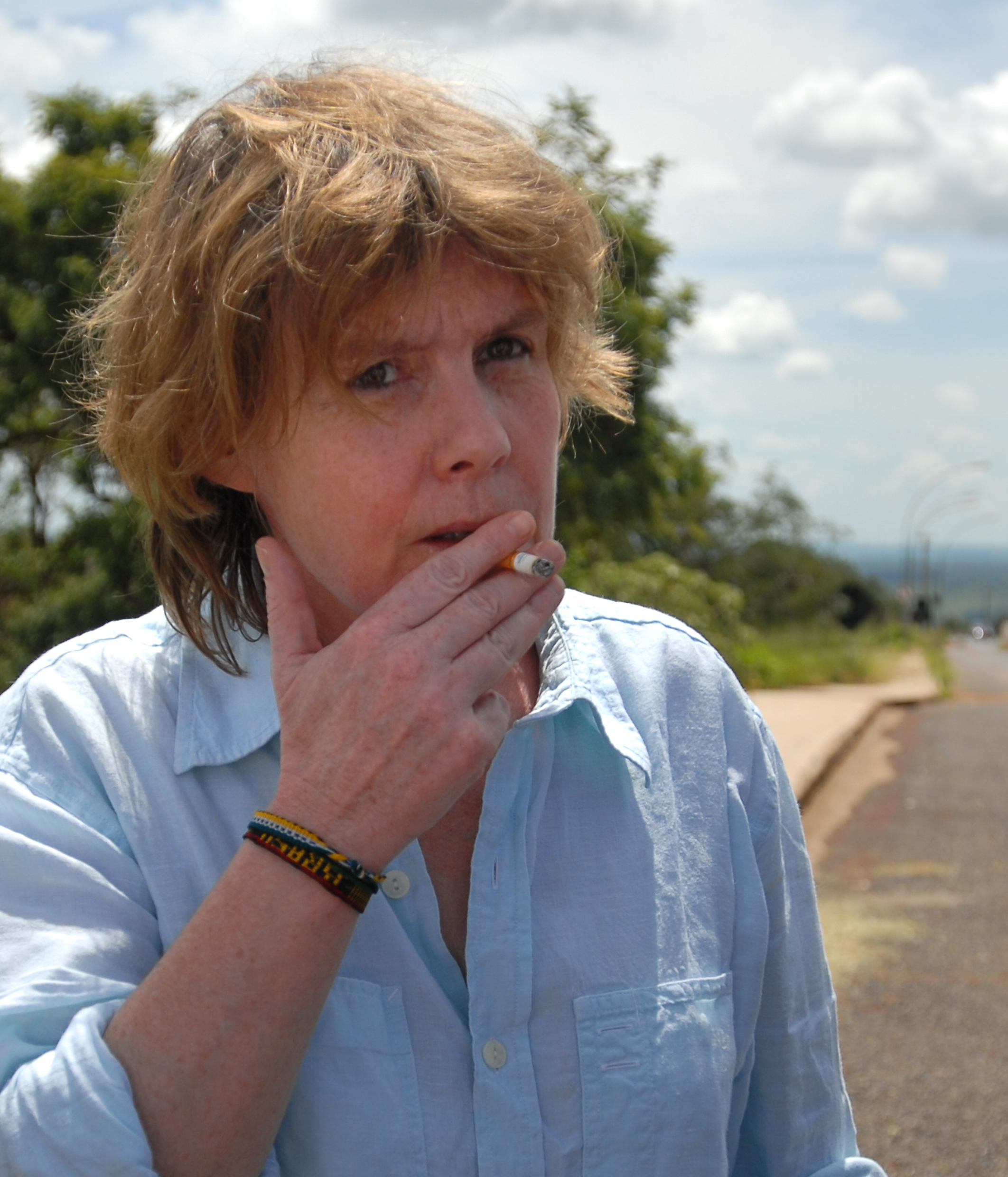
- Fred Vargas, 2009
- Born: 7 June 1957 (age 69); Paris, France
- Occupations: Medieval historian and archaeologist; writer
- Writing career
- Pen name: Fred Vargas
- Genre: Crime fiction

Fred Vargas is the pseudonym of Frédérique Audoin-Rouzeau (born 7 June 1957), a French historian, archaeologist and novelist.

As a historian and archeologist, she is known for her work on the Black Death. Her crime fiction policiers (police procedurals) have won three International Dagger Awards from the Crime Writers' Association, for three successive novels: in 2006, 2007 and 2009. She is the first author to achieve such an honour. In each case, her translator into English was Siân Reynolds, who was also recognized by the international award.

== Career as archaeologist ==
Audoin-Rouzeau worked at the French National Centre for Scientific Research (CNRS), which she joined in 1988. She later joined the Institut Pasteur, as a eukaryotic archaeologist. She has undertaken a project on the epidemiology of the Black Death and bubonic plague, the result of which was a work considered definitive in the research area: Les chemins de la peste (Routes of the Plague) (2003).

== Career as novelist ==
Vargas writes mostly police thrillers (policiers), although she simply refers to them as "puzzles". She found writing was a way to combine her interests and relax from her job as an academic. Her novels are set in Paris and feature the adventures of Chief Inspector Adamsberg and his team. Her interest in the Middle Ages is manifest in many of her novels, especially through the person of Marc Vandoosler, a young specialist in the period.

Seeking Whom He May Devour was shortlisted by the British Crime Writers' Association for the Gold Dagger award for best crime novel of the year in 2005. In 2006 her next novel, The Three Evangelists, won the inaugural Duncan Lawrie International Dagger. She also won the award in 2008 with Wash This Blood Clean From My Hand. She was the first author to be shortlisted for three successive novels. In 2009 Vargas was again awarded the International Dagger, becoming the first author to receive it for three successive novels, in tandem with the translator, in each case Siân Reynolds.

In 2018 Vargas won the Princess of Asturias Prize for letters.

== Defense of Cesare Battisti ==
Vargas took part in the defence of Cesare Battisti, an Italian former left-wing urban guerrilla turned writer sought by Italian and French justice since 2004, who was found guilty in absentia of involvement in four assassinations committed in the 1970s, during the "Years of Lead".

== Principal characters ==
- Three Evangelists series:
  - Marc Vandoosler, known as "Saint Mark": Historian specialising in medieval life
  - Lucien Devernois, known as "Saint Luke": Historian specialising in World War I (inspired by Vargas's brother Stéphane Audoin-Rouzeau)
  - Matthias Delamarre, known as "Saint Matthew": Historian specialising in prehistory
  - (These three characters, christened "the Evangelists," live in the same house, The Dosshouse together with "Old Man Vandoosler")
  - Armand Vandoosler: former police Commissaire, Marc's godfather, epicurean and oddball
  - Ludwig Kehlweiler: former policeman with a national network of informants and a toad Bufo
- Adamsberg series:
  - Commissaire Jean-Baptiste Adamsberg: peripatetic police chief, with Zen research methods
  - Adrien Danglard: methodical police inspector, Adamsberg's deputy. Divorced, father of five children and conspicuous white wine consumer
  - Camille Forestier: a musician/plumber who has a turbulent relationship with Adamsberg.

== Bibliography ==
- The Three Evangelists:
  - 1995 – Debout les morts; English translation: The Three Evangelists, 2006, (Prix Mystère de la critique; CWA International Dagger)
  - 1996 – Un peu plus loin sur la droite; English title: Dog Will Have His Day, 2014
  - 1997 – Sans feu ni lieu; English title: The Accordionist, 2017
- Commissaire Adamsberg:
  - 1991 – L’homme aux cercles bleus; English translation: The Chalk Circle Man, 2009, (CWA International Dagger)
  - 1999 – L'Homme à l'envers; English title: Seeking Whom He May Devour, 2004, (Prix Mystère de la critique)
  - 2000 – Les quatre fleuves. Graphic novel (with Edmond Baudoin); not published in English
  - 2001 – Pars vite et reviens tard; English title: Have Mercy on Us All, 2003, (Prix des libraires) (Adapted as a film in 2007)
  - 2002 – Coule la Seine. Three novellas; not published in English
  - 2004 – Sous les vents de Neptune; English title: Wash This Blood Clean from My Hand, 2007 (CWA International Dagger)
  - 2006 – Dans les bois éternels; English title: This Night's Foul Work, 2008
  - 2008 – Un lieu incertain; English title: An Uncertain Place, 2011
  - 2011 – L'armée furieuse; English title: The Ghost Riders of Ordebec, 2013 (CWA International Dagger)
  - 2015 – Temps glaciaires; English title: A Climate of Fear, 2016
  - 2017 – Quand sort la recluse; English title: This Poison Will Remain, 2019
  - 2023 – Sur la dalle ; English title: On the Slab
  - 2026 - Une unique lueur
- Other novels:
  - 1986 – Les Jeux de l'amour et de la mort (Prix du festival de Cognac)
  - 1994 – Ceux qui vont mourir te saluent
- Essays and other works
  - 2001 – Petit Traité de toutes vérités sur l'existence
  - 2003 – Critique de l'anxiété pure
  - 2004 – La Vérité sur Cesare Battisti
  - 2019 – L'Humanité en péril
  - 2022 – L'Humanité en péril-2

== Adaptations ==
There have been multiple adaptations of the Adamsberg novels:

- Have Mercy on Us All, a 2007 film starring José Garcia
- Collection Fred Vargas, a series of TV movies produced from 2008 to 2019, starring Jean-Hugues Anglade
- Beyond the Grave: A New Adamsberg Case, a two-part special based on Sur la Dalle, and starring Yvan Attal
