= Have Mercy on Us All =

2001 novel by Fred Vargas

- First edition (French)
- Author: Fred Vargas
- Original title: Pars vite et reviens tard
- Translator: David Bellos
- Language: French
- Series: Commissaire Adamsberg
- Genre: Crime novel
- Publisher: Viviane Hamy (French); The Harvill Press (English)
- Publication date: 2001
- Publication place: France
- English publication date: 9 October 2003
- Media type: Print (hardback & paperback)
- Pages: 346 pp (French); 352 pp (English)
- ISBN: 2-87858-152-0 (French); ISBN 1-84343-154-8 (English)
- OCLC: 48558381
- LC Class: PQ2682.A725 P3 2001
- Preceded by: Seeking Whom He May Devour
- Followed by: Wash This Blood Clean from My Hand

Have Mercy on Us All (French: Pars vite et reviens tard, lit. "Leave quickly and come back late") is a 2001 novel by French author Fred Vargas. The novel was her first to be translated into English in 2003 by David Bellos. It was made into a film released in 2007.

== Plot ==
Joss, a middle-aged former Breton sailor, begins to succeed in reviving the old family trade of town crier in modern-day Paris. Business is good, since people gladly pay five francs to hear their rants and nonsensical messages in parks and squares; every so often, ominous cryptic messages announcing the return of the plague will also be part of the day's requested cries.

At the same time, chief inspector Adamsberg is surprised as a distressed woman describes that all her apartment building's doors, except one, have been marked with a large inverted "4" in black ink with the inscription "CLT." This graffiti continues to turn up throughout the city, and residents of apartments with unmarked doors are turning up dead, showing signs of rat-flea bites and blackened flesh.

Inspector Adamsberg must lead an investigation that takes him through a juxtaposition of 15th-century Europe and modern-day France...or does he?
