= Marina Foïs =

French actress (born 1970)

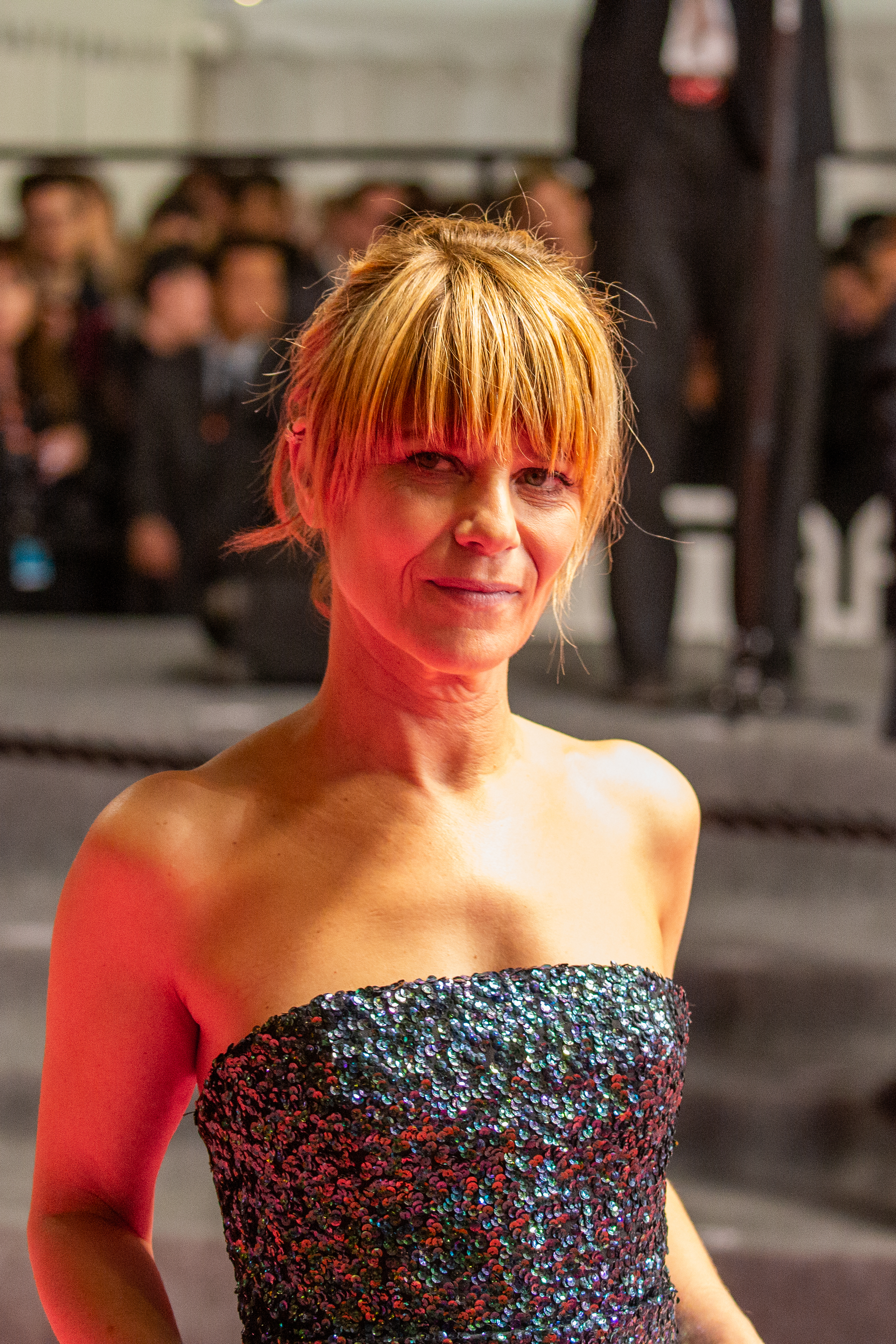
- Foïs in 2025
- Born: Marina Sylvie Foïs; 21 January 1970 (age 56); Boulogne-Billancourt, Hauts-de-Seine, France
- Occupation: Actress
- Years active: 1985–present
- Partner: Éric Lartigau

Marina Sylvie Foïs (born 21 January 1970) is a French actress.

== Early life and education ==
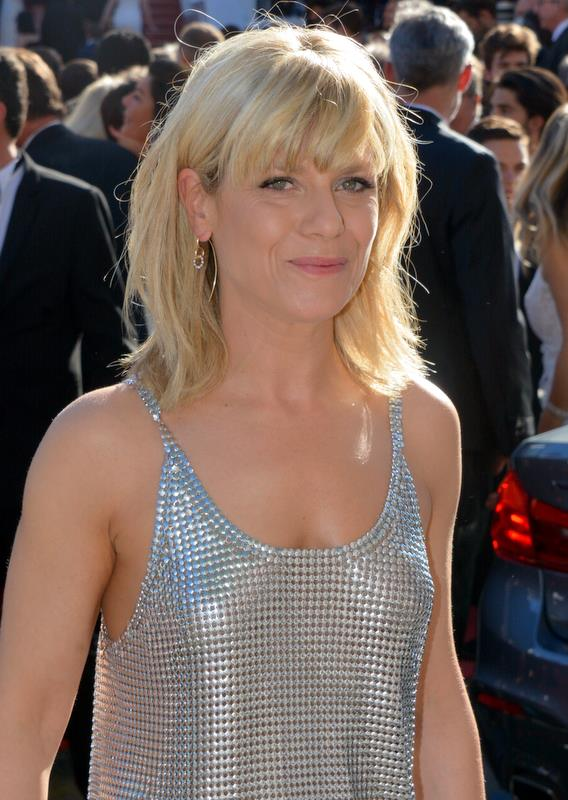
Marina Foïs at the 70th Cannes Film Festival in 2017

Marina Sylvie Foïs was born on 21 January 1970 in Boulogne-Billancourt, in the department of Hauts-de-Seine. She is of Russian, Jewish Egyptian, German, and Italian ancestry.

Foïs was discovered in 1986 for her comedy work in The School for Wives, at the age of 16. She decided to take classes by correspondence and obtained her high school final exam two years later.

== Career ==
Foïs joined The Royal Imperial Green Rabbit Company, which later became Les Robins des Bois, composed of students from the Cours Florent taught by Isabelle Nanty.

The troupe caught the attention of Dominique Farrugia in 1996 and went on to act and direct in the Comédie+ show La Grosse Émission for two years. During that period, Foïs co-wrote sketches with Pierre-François Martin-Laval, playing a number of various characters, like the dim-witted Sophie Pétoncule and the pedantic director Marie-Mûre. The show continued the next year on Canal+ and had a bigger audience. In June 2001, Foïs and the troupe parted ways to focus on their individual film careers.

On 25 November 2020, it was announced that Foïs would be the host for the 46th César Awards.

== Personal life ==
Marina Foïs has two sisters. Giulia Foïs is a journalist at Libération and a former columnist in the program Arrêt sur images presented by Daniel Schneidermann on France 5, and a current news anchor on I-Télé. Her second sister Elena is a doctor. Their brother, Fabio, died of an airplane crash while participating in an aerobatic demonstration.

Marina was in a partnership with fellow "Robins des Bois" actor Maurice Barthélemy. She also dated Maxime Lefrançois, Mister Univers 2010.

She started dating the director Éric Lartigau in 1999. On 3 December 2004 she gave birth to a boy, Lazare, at the Hôpital Saint-Antoine in Paris. They had a second son, Georges, born on 25 September 2008. Since 2025, she disclose being in relationship with actress Zaho de Sagazan, twenty years younger than her.

== Filmography ==
Year	Title	Role	Director	Notes
1993	La perme	Solange	Emmanuel Silvestre & Thibault Staib	Short
1994	Casque bleu	Julie	Gérard Jugnot	
1997	Et si on faisait un bébé ?	Marianne	Christiane Spiero	TV movie
1998	Serial Lover	Mina Schuster	James Huth	
1999	Trafic d'influence	The firecrackers guest	Dominique Farrugia	
1999	L'amour déchiré	The girl	Yann Piquer	Short
1999	Triste à mourir	Noémie	Alexandre Billon	Short
1999	Rien ne sert de courir	The girl	Patrick Bosso	Short
2000	Uppercut	The young girl	Patrice Jourdan & Sören Prévost	Short
2000	L'instant norvégien	Various	Les Robins des Bois	TV series
2000–2001	La cape et l'épée	La reine Pupute / Petite Moule	Jean-Jacques Amsellem	TV series (24 episodes)
2001	La Tour Montparnasse Infernale	Stéphanie Lanceval	Charles Nemes	
2002	The Race	Young nurse	Djamel Bensalah	
2002	Hypnotized and Hysterical	Natacha	Claude Duty	Nominated - César Award for Most Promising Actress
2002	Asterix & Obelix: Mission Cleopatra	Sucettalanis	Alain Chabat	
2002	Jojo la frite	Marie	Nicolas Cuche	
2002	Restauratec	Lady Service	Nicolas & Bruno	TV Short
2003	The Car Keys	Herself	Laurent Baffie	
2003	Bienvenue au gîte	Caroline	Claude Duty	
2003	Mais qui a tué Pamela Rose ?	The customer of the pharmacy	Éric Lartigau	
2004	RRRrrrr!!!	Guy	Alain Chabat	
2004	Un petit jeu sans conséquence	Axelle	Bernard Rapp	
2004	J'me sens pas belle	Fanny Fontana	Bernard Jeanjean	
2004	Casablanca Driver	Sandy O'Brian	Maurice Barthélémy	
2005	À boire	Bénédicte	Marion Vernoux	
2006	Essaye-moi	Firmin's Mother	Pierre-François Martin-Laval	
2006	Un ticket pour l'espace	Soizic Le Guilvinec	Éric Lartigau	
2006	Les hommes s'en souviendront...	Simone Veil	Valérie Müller	Short
2007	Darling	Catherine Nicolle	Christine Carrière	Nominated - César Award for Best Actress; Nominated - Lumière Award for Best Actress
2008	Me Two	Muriel Perrache	Nicolas & Bruno	
2008	A Simple Heart	Mathilde Aubain	Marion Laine	
2008	Le plaisir de chanter	Muriel	Ilan Duran Cohen	
2009	Change of Plans	Mélanie Carcassonne	Danièle Thompson	
2009	All About Actresses	Herself	Maïwenn	
2009	Making Plans for Lena	Frédérique	Christophe Honoré	
2010	22 Bullets	Marie Goldman	Richard Berry	
2010	Happy Few	Rachel	Antony Cordier	
2010	The Big Picture	Sarah Exben	Éric Lartigau	
2011	Polisse	Iris	Maïwenn	Globes de Cristal Award for Best Actress; Nominated - César Award for Best Actress; Nominated - Lumière Award for Best Actress
2011	Les yeux de sa mère	Maylis Tremazan	Thierry Klifa	
2012	Maman	Alice	Alexandra Leclère	
2012	Frank-Étienne vers la béatitude	Glaïeul	Constance Meyer	Short
2012	Bref	Herself	Kyan Khojandi	TV series (1 episode)
2013	Vandal	Hélène	Hélier Cisterne	
2013	Boule & Bill	Maman Boule	Alexandre Charlot & Franck Magnier	
2013	The Ultimate Accessory	Sophie	Valérie Lemercier	
2013	Le débarquement	Various	Renaud Le Van Kim	TV series (1 episode)
2014	Bodybuilder	Léa	Roschdy Zem	
2014	Paris Follies	Christiane	Marc Fitoussi	
2014	Tiens-toi droite	Louise	Katia Lewkowicz	
2014	Tout est permis	The psy	Émilie Deleuze	TV movie
2014	3xManon	Monique	Jean-Xavier de Lestrade	TV mini-series
2015	Orage	Maria	Fabrice Camoin	
2015	Daddy or Mommy	Florence Leroy	Martin Bourboulon	
2015	Démons	Catarina	Marcial Di Fonzo Bo	TV movie
2016	Pericle	Anastasia	Stefano Mordini	
2016	Faultless (Irréprochable)	Constance Beauvau	Sébastien Marnier	Nominated - César Award for Best Actress
2016	Daddy or Mommy 2	Florence Corrigan	Martin Bourboulon	
2016	La Tour 2 contrôle infernale	Stéphanie Lanceval	Éric Judor	
2016	Two Snails Set Off	Voice	Jean-Pierre Jeunet & Romain Segaud	Short
2017	The Workshop	Olivia Dejazet	Laurent Cantet	Nominated - César Award for Best Actress
2017	Les réfugiés	The mother	Matthieu Tribes	Short
2017	Manon 20 ans	Monique	Jean-Xavier de Lestrade	TV mini-series
2017	Calls	Sophie	Timothée Hochet	TV series (1 episode)
2018	Sink or Swim	Claire	Gilles Lellouche	
2018	Gaspard va au mariage	Peggy	Antony Cordier	
2019	Une intime conviction	Nora	Antoine Raimbault	
2019	Savages	Marion	Rebecca Zlotowski	TV mini-series
2020	Énorme	Claire Girard	Sophie Letourneur	
2020	The Players	Wife	Stefano Mordini	
2021	La Salamandre	Catherine	Alex Carvalho	
2021	Ils sont vivants	Béatrice	Jérémie Elkaïm	
2021	Some Like It Rare	Sophie Pascal	Fabrice Eboué	
2021	La fracture	Julie	Catherine Corsini	
2022	The Sitting Duck	Anne Lauvergeon	Jean-Paul Salomé	
2022	Cet été-là	Sarah	Éric Lartigau	
2023	Represent	Corinne Douanier	Jean-Pascal Zadi	TV series
2024	Furies	Selma		
2025	The Richest Woman in the World	Frédérique Spielman	Thierry Klifa	

== Dubbing ==
Year	Title	Role
2005	Madagascar	Gloria
2008	Madagascar: Escape 2 Africa	Gloria
2012	Madagascar 3: Europe's Most Wanted	Gloria

== Theater ==
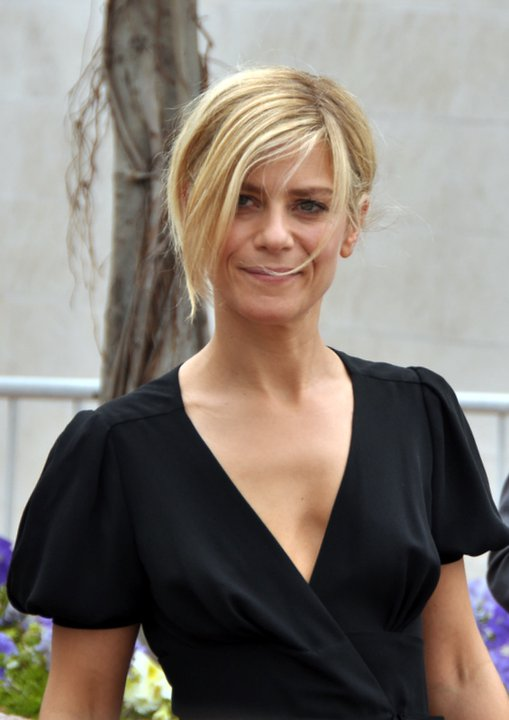
Marina Foïs at the 2011 Cannes Film Festival.

Year	Title	Author	Director	Notes
1986	The School for Wives	Molière	Jean-Marc Brisset	
1987	L'Occasion	Prosper Mérimée	Fanny Mentre	
1988	Britannicus	Jean Racine	Olivier Médicus & Jean-Marc Brisset	
1991	Le Bébé de Monsieur Laurent	Roland Topor	Jean-Christophe Berjon	
1991	29 degrés à l'ombre Maman Sabouleux	Eugène Labiche	Isabelle Nanty	
1992	Zizanie	Julien Vartet	Raymond Acquaviva	
1993	Reniflard and Co	Marx Brothers	Jean-Christophe Berjon	
1993	Souffleurs	Dino Buzzati	Jean-Christophe Berjon	
1994	La Princesse d'Élide	Molière	Jean-Luc Revol	
1995	L'Heureux Stratagème	Pierre de Marivaux	Jean-Luc Revol	
1996	Dorothy Parker : Les heures blêmes	Dorothy Parker	Jean-Luc Revol	
1997	Robin des Bois d'à peu près Alexandre Dumas	Alexandre Dumas	Pierre-François Martin-Laval	
2005–06	La Tour de la Défense	Copi	Marcial Di Fonzo Bo	Festival d'Avignon
2006	Les poulets n'ont pas de chaises	Copi	Marcial Di Fonzo Bo & Élise Vigier	Festival d'Avignon
2006	Viol	Botho Strauß	Luc Bondy	Odéon-Théâtre de l'Europe
2008–09	La Estupidez	Rafael Spregelburd	Marcial Di Fonzo Bo & Élise Vigier	Théâtre national de Chaillot; Théâtre National de Bretagne
2010	A Doll's House	Henrik Ibsen	Jean-Louis Martinelli	Théâtre Nanterre-Amandiers
2011	Harper Regan	Simon Stephens	Lukas Hemleb	Théâtre du Rond-Point
2012	A Doll's House	Henrik Ibsen	Jean-Louis Martinelli	Théâtre du Gymnase Marie Bell
2018	The Idols (Les Idoles)	Christophe Honoré	Christophe Honoré	Théâtre National de Bretagne

== Awards and nominations ==
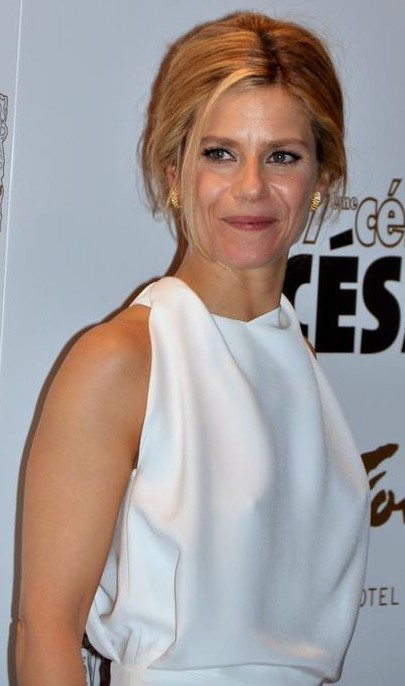
Marina Foïs at the 37th César Awards in 2012.

=== César Award ===
Year	Nominated work	Category	Result
2003	Hypnotized and Hysterical (Hairstylist Wanted)	Most Promising Actress	Nominated
2008	Darling	Best Actress	Nominated
2012	Polisse	Best Actress	Nominated
2017	Faultless (Irréprochable)	Best Actress	Nominated
2018	The Workshop	Best Actress	Nominated

=== Etoile d'Or ===
Year	Nominated work	Category	Result
2008	Darling	Most Promising Actress	Nominated

=== Globes de Cristal Awards ===
Year	Nominated work	Category	Result
2012	Polisse	Best Actress	Won

=== Lumière Awards ===
Year	Nominated work	Category	Result
2008	Darling	Best Actress	Nominated
2012	Polisse	Best Actress	Nominated

=== Feroz Awards ===
Year	Nominated work	Category	Result
2023	The Beasts	Best Actress in a Film	Nominated

=== Goya Awards ===
Year	Nominated work	Category	Result
2023	The Beasts	Best Actress	Nominated
