= Eglantine Rembauville =

French film actress (born 1981)

- Born: Eglantine Rembauville-Nicolle; 1981 (age 43–44)
- Occupation: Actress

Eglantine Rembauville-Nicolle (born 1981, also credited as Eglantine Rembauville) is a French film actress active in French and British cinema and television. She is notable for roles in Scenes of a Sexual Nature, The Bill and The Da Vinci Code, and the French television series Le bleu de l'océan.
