= Patrick Poivey =

French actor (1948–2020)

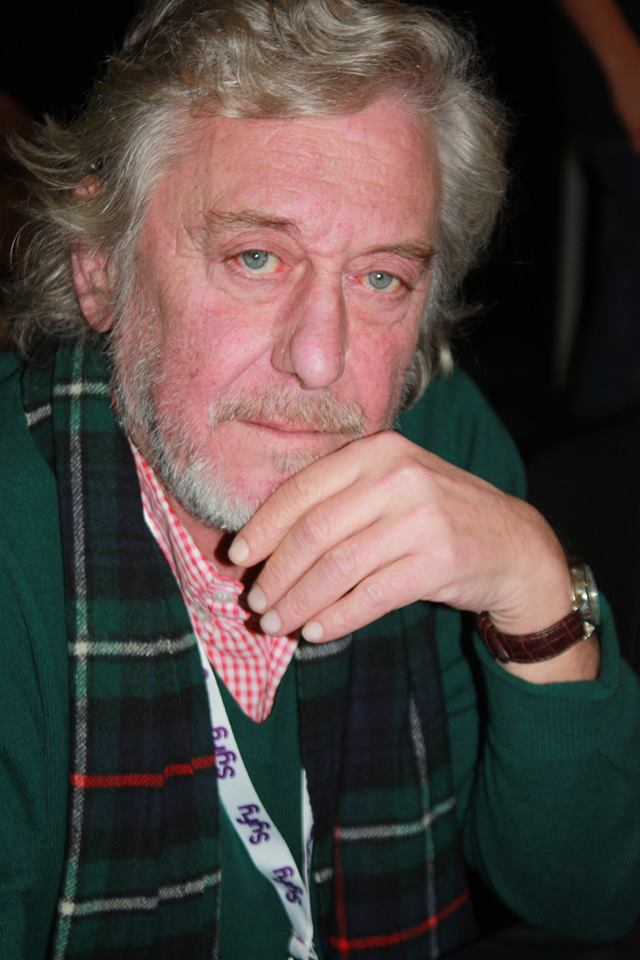
- Patrick Poivey in 2013.
- Born: 18 February 1948; Paris, France
- Died: 16 June 2020 (aged 72); Paris, France
- Citizenship: French
- Years active: 1972-2020

Patrick Poivey (18 February 1948 – 16 June 2020) was a French actor. He was primarily known for being a voice actor, having dubbed Bruce Willis's films and series from 1987 until his death.

== Filmography ==
- Loulou (1980) ... Philippe
- Watani, un monde sans mal (1998) ... Patrick Clément
- Mune: Guardian of the Moon (2014) ... Phospho

== Voice actor ==
=== Film dubbings ===
1. Somebody Killed Her Husband (1978) ... Jerry Green (Jeff Bridges)
2. Winter Kills (1979) ... Nick Kegan (Jeff Bridges)
3. They Call Me Trinity (1980) ... Trinity
4. Trinity Is Still My Name (1980) ... Trinity
5. Stripes (1981) ... Pvt. John Winger (Bill Murray)
6. Tootsie (1982) ... Jeff Slater (Bill Murray)
7. Rumble Fish (1983) ... Motorcycle Boy (Mickey Rourke)
8. Terms of Endearment (1983) ... Flap Horton (Jeff Daniels)
9. The Terminator (1984) ... Kyle Reese (Michael Biehn)
10. The Purple Rose of Cairo (1985) ... Tom Baxter/Gil Shepherd (Jeff Daniels)
11. Something Wild (1986) ... Charles Driggs (Jeff Daniels)
12. 9½ Weeks (1986) ... John Gray (Mickey Rourke)
13. Manhunter (1986) ... Francis Dollarhyde (Tom Noonan)
14. Top Gun (1986) ... LT Pete "Maverick" Mitchell (Tom Cruise)
15. The Color of Money (1986) ... Vincent Lauria (Tom Cruise)
16. Wall Street (1987) ... Bud Fox (Charlie Sheen)
17. A Prayer for the Dying (1987) ... Martin Fallon (Mickey Rourke)
18. No Way Out (1987) ... Lieutenant Commander Tom Farrell (Kevin Costner)
19. The Principal (1987) ... Principal Rick Latimer (James Belushi)
20. Radio Days (1987) ... Biff Baxter (Jeff Daniels)
21. The Seventh Sign (1988) ... Russell Quinn (Michael Biehn)
22. Rain Man (1988) ... Charlie Babbitt (Tom Cruise)
23. Miles from Home (1988) ... Frank Roberts Jr. (Richard Gere)
24. Sunset (1988) ... Tom Mix (Bruce Willis)
25. Die Hard (1988) ... John McClane (Bruce Willis)
26. Young Guns (1988) ... William H. "Billy the Kid" Bonney (Emilio Estevez)
27. Bull Durham (1988) ... "Crash" Davis (Kevin Costner)
28. The Presidio (1988) ... SFPD inspector Jay Austin (Mark Harmon)
29. Born on the Fourth of July (1989) ... Ron Kovic (Tom Cruise)
30. In Country (1989) ... Emmett Smith (Bruce Willis)
31. Dead Bang (1989) ... LASD Detective Jerry Beck (Don Johnson)
32. Homer and Eddie (1989) ... Homer Lanza (James Belushi)
33. Major League (1989) ... Ricky Vaughn (Charlie Sheen)
34. The Palermo Connection (1989) ... Carmine Bonavia (James Belushi)
35. Wild Orchid (1989) ... James Wheeler (Mickey Rourke)
36. Field of Dreams (1989) ... Ray Kinsella (Kevin Costner)
37. Die Hard 2 (1990) ... John McClane (Bruce Willis)
38. Days of Thunder (1990) ... Cole Trickle (Tom Cruise)
39. Young Guns II (1990) ... William H. "Billy the Kid" Bonney (Emilio Estevez)
40. The Bonfire of the Vanities (1990) ... Peter Fallow (Bruce Willis)
41. The Hot Spot (1990) ... Harry Madox (Don Johnson)
42. Hudson Hawk (1991) ... Eddie Hawkins/Hudson Hawk (Bruce Willis)
43. Billy Bathgate (1991) ... Bo Weinberg (Bruce Willis)
44. Mortal Thoughts (1991) ... James Urbanski (Bruce Willis)
45. The Last Boy Scout (1991) ... Joseph "Joe" Cornelius Hallenbeck (Bruce Willis)
46. Paradise (1991) ... Ben Reed (Don Johnson)
47. Harley Davidson and the Marlboro Man (1991) ... Harley Davidson (Mickey Rourke)
48. Death Becomes Her (1992) ... Dr. Ernest Menville (Bruce Willis)
49. Far and Away (1992) ... Joseph Donnelly (Tom Cruise)
50. Peter's Friends (1992) ... Andrew Benson (Kenneth Branagh)
51. White Sands (1992) ... Gorman Lennox (Mickey Rourke)
52. The Firm (1993) ... Mitch McDeere (Tom Cruise)
53. Striking Distance (1993) ... Det. Thomas Hardy (Bruce Willis)
54. Guilty as Sin (1993) ... David Greenhill (Don Johnson)
55. Mr. Jones (1993) ... Mr. Jones (Richard Gere)
56. Much Ado About Nothing (1993) ... Benedick (Kenneth Branagh)
57. Pulp Fiction (1994) ... Butch Coolidge (Bruce Willis)
58. Color of Night (1994) ... Dr. Bill Capa (Bruce Willis)
59. Four Rooms (1995) ... Leo (Bruce Willis)
60. 12 Monkeys (1995) ... James Cole (Bruce Willis)
61. Die Hard with a Vengeance (1995) ... John McClane (Bruce Willis)
62. Mighty Morphin Power Rangers: The Movie (1995) ... Tommy Oliver, The White Ranger (Jason David Frank)
63. Mission: Impossible (1996) ... Ethan Hunt (Tom Cruise)
64. Last Man Standing (1996) ... John Smith (Bruce Willis)
65. The Jackal (1997) ... The Jackal (Bruce Willis)
66. Turbo: A Power Rangers Movie (1997) ... Tommy Oliver, The Red Turbo Ranger (Jason David Frank)
67. Gang Related (1997) ... Det. Frank Divinci (James Belushi)
68. Mercury Rising (1998) ... Special Agent Art Jeffries (Bruce Willis)
69. Armageddon (1998) ... Harry Stamper (Bruce Willis)
70. The Siege (1998) ... U.S. Army Major General William Devereaux (Bruce Willis)
71. Breakfast of Champions (1999) ... Dwayne Hoover (Bruce Willis)
72. The Sixth Sense (1999) ... Dr. Malcolm Crowe (Bruce Willis)
73. Magnolia (1999) ... Frank T.J. Mackey (Tom Cruise)
74. The Whole Nine Yards (2000) ... Jimmy Tudeski/"The Tulip" (Bruce Willis)
75. Disney's The Kid (2000) ... Russ Duritz (Bruce Willis)
76. Unbreakable (2000) ... David Dunn (Bruce Willis)
77. Bandits (2001) ... Joe Blake (Bruce Willis)
78. Hart's War (2002) ... Colonel William A. McNamara (Bruce Willis)
79. Austin Powers in Goldmember (2002) ... Tom Cruise as Austin Powers
80. Tears of the Sun (2003) ... Lieutenant A.K. Waters (Bruce Willis)
81. Charlie's Angels: Full Throttle (2003) ... William Rose Bailey (Bruce Willis)
82. Freaky Friday (2003) ... Ryan (Mark Harmon)
83. The Whole Ten Yards (2004) ... Jimmy "The Tulip" Tudeski (Bruce Willis)
84. Ocean's Twelve (2004) ... Bruce Willis
85. Domino (2005) ... Ed Moseby (Mickey Rourke)
86. The Chronicles of Narnia: The Lion, the Witch and the Wardrobe (2005) ... The Fox (Rupert Everett)
87. Hostage (2005) ... Police Chief Jeff Talley (Bruce Willis)
88. Sin City (2005) ... John Hartigan (Bruce Willis)
89. Good Night, and Good Luck (2005) ... Sig Mickelson (Jeff Daniels)
90. 16 Blocks (2006) ... Det. Jack Mosley (Bruce Willis)
91. Talladega Nights: The Ballad of Ricky Bobby (2006) ... Reese Bobby (Gary Cole)
92. Fast Food Nation (2006) ... Harry Rydell (Bruce Willis)
93. Lucky Number Slevin (2006) ... Mr. Goodkat/Smith (Bruce Willis)
94. Unaccompanied Minors (2006) ... Oliver Porter (Lewis Black)
95. Alpha Dog (2006) ... Sonny Truelove (Bruce Willis)
96. Perfect Stranger (2007) ... Harrison Hill (Bruce Willis)
97. Planet Terror (2007) ... Lt. Muldoon (Bruce Willis)
98. Live Free or Die Hard (2007) ... John McClane (Bruce Willis)
99. Moondance Alexander (2007) ... Dante Longpre (Don Johnson)
100. Forever Strong (2008) ... Coach Larry Gelwix (Gary Cole)
101. What Just Happened (2008) ... Bruce Willis
102. Outpost (2008) ... McKay (Michael Smiley)
103. Surrogates (2009) ... Tom Greer (Bruce Willis)
104. Cop Out (2010) ... Detective James "Jimmy" Monroe (Bruce Willis)
105. The Expendables (2010) ... Mr. Church (Bruce Willis)
106. Red (2010) ... Francis "Frank" Moses (Bruce Willis)
107. Machete (2010) ... Von Jackson (Don Johnson)
108. Catch .44 (2011) ... Mel (Bruce Willis)
109. Bucky Larson: Born to Be a Star (2011) ... Miles Deep (Don Johnson)
110. New Year's Eve (2011) ... Building Super (James Belushi)
111. Zookeeper (2011) ... Barry the Indian Elephant (Judd Apatow)
112. The Cold Light of Day (2012) ... Martin Shaw (Bruce Willis)
113. Moonrise Kingdom (2012) ... Captain Duffy Sharp (Bruce Willis)
114. Lay the Favorite (2012) ... Dink Heimowitz (Bruce Willis)
115. The Expendables 2 (2012) ... Church (Bruce Willis)
116. Looper (2012) ... Old Joe (Bruce Willis)
117. Django Unchained (2012) ... Spencer "Big Daddy" Bennett (Don Johnson)
118. Fire with Fire (2012) ... Mike Cella (Bruce Willis)
119. Sweetwater (2013) ... Kingfisher (Luce Rains)
120. A Good Day to Die Hard (2013) ... John McClane (Bruce Willis)
121. Hansel & Gretel: Witch Hunters (2013) ... Sheriff Berringer (Peter Stormare)
122. The Last Stand (2013) ... Thomas Burrell (Peter Stormare)
123. G.I. Joe: Retaliation (2013) ... General Joseph Colton (Bruce Willis)
124. Red 2 (2013) ... Francis "Frank" Moses (Bruce Willis)
