= Me Two =

2008 film by Nicolas & Bruno

- Directed by: Nicolas Charlet and Bruno Lavaine
- Written by: Nicolas Charlet and Bruno Lavaine
- Produced by: Alain Chabat; Amandine Billot
- Starring: Daniel Auteuil; Alain Chabat; Marina Foïs
- Cinematography: Laurent Dailland
- Edited by: Reynald Bertrand
- Music by: Nicolas Errèra
- Production companies: Chez Wam; Ciné+
- Distributed by: StudioCanal
- Release date: 18 June 2008
- Running time: 84 minutes
- Country: France
- Language: French
- Budget: $9 million
- Box office: $2.2 million

Me Two (French: La Personne Aux Deux Personnes) is a 2008 French comedy film directed by Nicolas Charlet and Bruno Lavaine

== Plot ==
Gilles Gabriel, a minor pop star in the 1980s, dies in a car accident caused by Jean-Christian Ranu, an uptight employee of a large corporation, whose headquarters are at La Defense just outside Paris. But Gilles is not totally dead: his spirit has landed in Jean-Christian's head and Jean-Christian has a hard time figuring out who is suddenly talking to him. As for Gilles, he's as boisterous as ever, but has no control over his host's behaviour. Gilles and Jean-Christian go through various stages before accepting the obvious: they are going to have to cope with the situation, two people in one person's body, despite their entirely different personalities. Condemned to intimacy, they learn how to get on, stretch each other's boundaries, and surprise each other.

== Cast ==
- Daniel Auteuil as Jean-Christian Ranu
- Alain Chabat as Gilles Gabriel
- Marina Fois as Muriel Perrache
- François Damiens as COGIP Doctor
- JoeyStarr as himself
- Herbert Léonard as himself
