= Max Linder Panorama =

Movie theater in Paris 9e Arrondissement, France

Coordinates: 48°52′16.93″N 2°20′41.52″E

The Max Linder Panorama
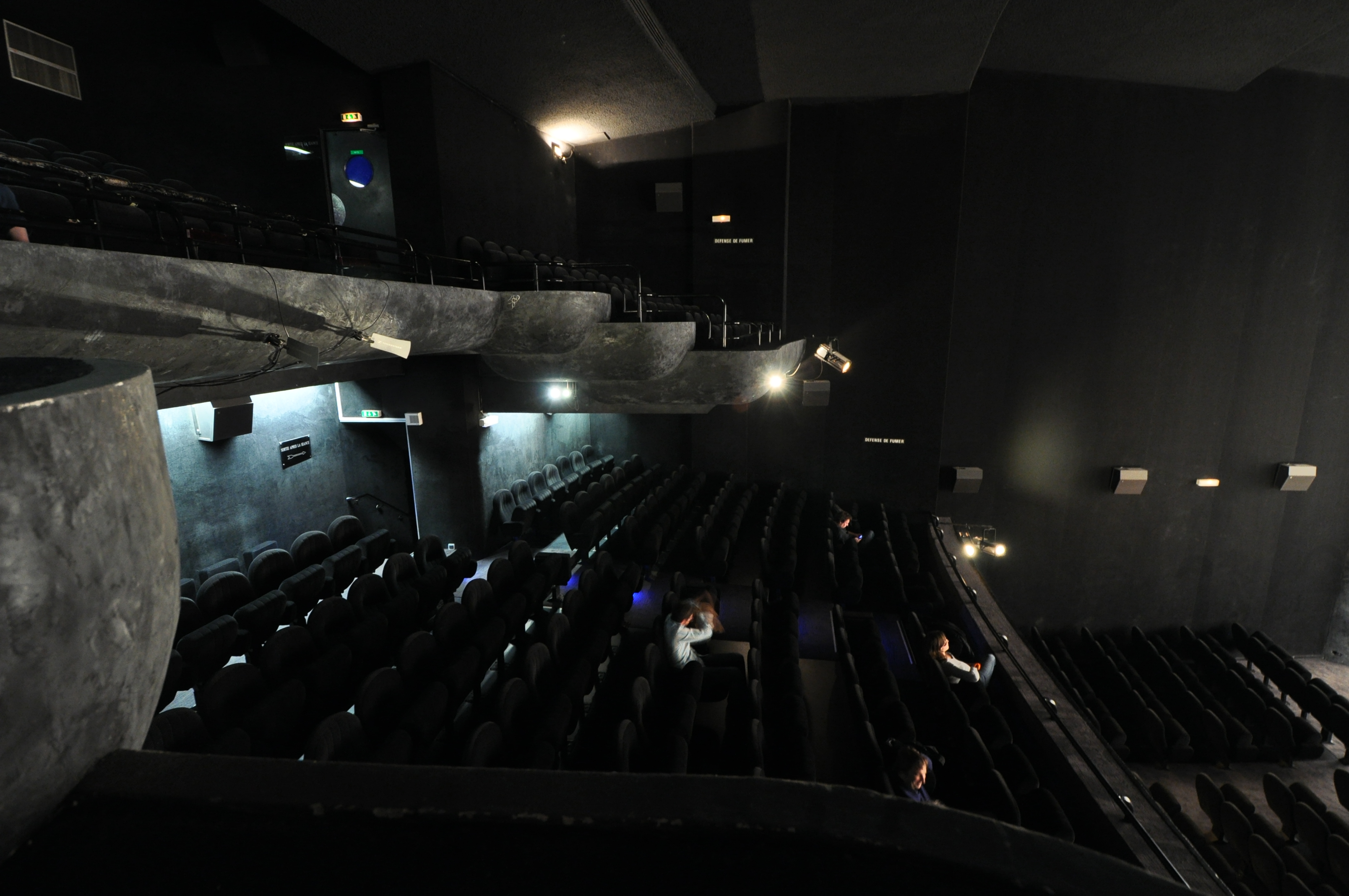
- Interior of Max Linder Panorama
- Interactive map of The Max Linder Panorama
- Location: Paris, France
- Capacity: 557
- Type: Cinema

Construction
- Opened: 1912

The Max Linder Panorama is a cinema in Paris. It has been described as "one of the most beautiful Parisian movie theatres".

== History ==
Inaugurated in 1912, the venue was quickly acquired by Max Linder, a pioneer of burlesque cinema.

Threatened with closure in the 1980s, the Max Linder was bought by a group of cinephiles with a view to restoration. Rather than subdividing the available space to allow for additional smaller screens (a popular solution at the time), the owners elected to preserve the original theatre and install a curved panoramic screen.

The cinema's screen, 18m wide, is one of the largest in Paris.

== Programming ==
The Max Linder specialises in spectacular international productions, animations, and retrospectives.
