= Danse avec les stars =

- Created by: BBC Worldwide
- Presented by: Vincent Cerutti (1–5); Sandrine Quétier (1–8); Laurent Ournac (6–7); Karine Ferri (8–10); Camille Combal (9–present)
- Judges: Chris Marques (1–present); Alessandra Martines (1–2); Jean-Marc Généreux (1–10, 13–present); Shy'm (3–4, 9–10); Marie-Claude Pietragalla (3–7); M. Pokora (5); Fauve Hautot (6–8, 13–present); Nico Archambault (8); Patrick Dupond (9–10); Jean Paul Gaultier (11); Denitsa Ikonomova (11); François Alu (11–12); Marie-Agnès Gillot (12); Bilal Hassani (12); Mel Charlot (13-present)
- Country of origin: France
- No. of seasons: 15
- No. of episodes: 133 (+2 specials)

Production
- Production location: Paris
- Running time: 1–2 hours

Original release
- Network: TF1
- Release: 12 February 2011 – present

Danse avec les stars (French pronunciation: [dɑ̃s avɛk le staʁ], lit. 'Dancing with the Stars', abbr. DALS) is the French version of the British reality TV competition Strictly Come Dancing and is part of the Dancing with the Stars franchise. The show was first broadcast on TF1 on 12 February 2011, the participants having been selected in November 2010. The first series finale took place on 19 March 2011. A second series was broadcast between 8 October – 19 November 2011. Since then TF1 has chosen to broadcast the program once a year, in the autumn. The show has tentatively scheduled its thirteenth series to begin in 2024.

The competition rules are similar to those of the original British version.

== Seasons ==
Season	No. of stars	No. of weeks	Premiere	Finale	Celebrity honor places		
Season	No. of stars	No. of weeks	Premiere	Finale	Winner	Runner-up	Third place
Season 1 2011	8	6	12 February 2011	19 March 2011	M. Pokora (with Katrina Patchett)	Sofia Essaïdi (with Maxime Dereymez)	David Ginola (with Silvia Notargiacomo)
Season 2 2011	9	7	8 October 2011	19 November 2011	Shy'm (with Maxime Dereymez)	Philippe Candeloro (with Candice Pascal)	Baptiste Giabiconi (with Fauve Hautot)
Season 3 2012	10	9	6 October 2012	1 December 2012	Emmanuel Moire (with Fauve Hautot)	Amel Bent (with Christophe Licata)	Taïg Khris (with Denitsa Ikonomova)
Special; Christmas 2012	9	1	22 December 2012		Amel Bent (with Christophe Licata)	Sofia Essaïdi (with Maxime Dereymez)	M. Pokora (with Katrina Patchett)
Season 4 2013	10	9	28 September 2013	23 November 2013	Alizée (with Grégoire Lyonnet)	Brahim Zaibat (with Katrina Patchett)	Laëtitia Milot (with Christophe Licata)
Season 5 2014	11	10	27 September 2014	29 November 2014	Rayane Bensetti (with Denitsa Ikonomova)	Nathalie Péchalat (with Christophe Licata)	Brian Joubert (with Katrina Patchett)
Season 6 2015	10	9	24 October 2015	23 December 2015	Loïc Nottet (with Denitsa Ikonomova)	Priscilla Betti (with Christophe Licata)	Olivier Dion (with Candice Pascal)
Season 7 2016	11	10	15 October 2016	16 December 2016	Laurent Maistret (with Denitsa Ikonomova)	Camille Lou (with Grégoire Lyonnet)	Artus (with Marie Denigot)
Le grand show 2017	12	1	4 February 2017		Loïc Nottet (with Denitsa Ikonomova)	Alizée (with Grégoire Lyonnet)	Laurent Maistret (with Denitsa Ikonomova), Laurent Ournac (with Denitsa Ikonomova) & Tonya Kinzinger (with Maxime Dereymez)
Season 8 2017	10	10	14 October 2017	13 December 2017	Agustín Galiana (with Candice Pascal)	Lenni-Kim (with Marie Denigot)	Tatiana Silva (with Christophe Licata)
Season 9 2018	11	10	29 September 2018	1 December 2018	Clément Rémiens (with Denitsa Ikonomova)	Iris Mittenaere (with Anthony Colette)	Terence Telle (with Fauve Hautot)
Season 10 2019	10	10	21 September 2019	23 November 2019	Sami El Gueddari (with Fauve Hautot)	Ladji Doucouré (with Inès Vandamme)	Elsa Esnoult (with Anthony Colette)
Season 11 2021	13	11	17 September 2021	26 November 2021	Tayc (with Fauve Hautot)	Bilal Hassani (with Jordan Mouillerac)	Michou (with Elsa Bois)
Season 12 2022	12	10	9 September 2022	11 November 2022	Billy Crawford (with Fauve Hautot)	Carla Lazzari (with Pierre Mauduy)	Stéphane Legar (with Calisson Goasdoué)
Season 13 2024	12	10	16 February 2024	26 April 2024	Natasha St-Pier (with Anthony Colette)	Nico Capone (with Inès Vandamme)	Inès Reg (with Christophe Licata)
Danse avec les stars d'Internet	6	3	9 March 2024	29 March 2024	Domingo (with Inès Vandamme)	Natoo (with Anthony Colette)	Gaëlle Garcia Diaz (with Jordan Mouillerac)
Season 14 2025	12	11	7 February 2025	25 April 2025	Lénie (with Jordan Mouillerac)	Florent Manaudou (with Elsa Bois)	Adil Rami (with Ana Riera)
Season 15 2026	12	11	23 January 2026	17 April 2026	Samuel Bambi (with Ana Riera)	Juju Fitcats (with Jordan Mouillerac)	Emma (with Dorian Rollin)

== Presenters ==
Season	Season 1 (2011)	Season 2 (2011)	Season 3 (2012)	Season 4 (2013)	Season 5 (2014)	Season 6 (2015)	Season 7 (2016)	Season 8 (2017)	Season 9 (2018)	Season 10 (2019)	Season 11 (2021)	Season 12 (2022)	Season 13 (2024)	DALSI (2024)	Season 14 (2025)	Season 15 (2026)
Presented by	Vincent Cerutti					Sandrine Quétier			Camille Combal					Michou	Camille Combal	
Red room	Sandrine Quétier					Laurent Ournac		see list	Karine Ferri			none		Doigby	none	
Judges	Jean-Marc Généreux										Jean Paul Gaultier	Bilal Hassani	Jean-Marc Généreux			
Judges	Alessandra Martines		Shy'm		M. Pokora	Fauve Hautot			Shy'm		Denitsa Ikonomova	Marie-Agnès Gillot	Fauve Hautot			
Judges	Chris Marques															
Judges			Marie-Claude Pietragalla					Nico Archambault	Patrick Dupond		François Alu		Mel Charlot			
Winner	M. Pokora	Shy'm	Emmanuel Moire	Alizée	Rayane Bensetti	Loïc Nottet	Laurent Maistret	Agustín Galiana	Clément Rémiens	Sami El Gueddari	Tayc	Billy Crawford	Natasha St-Pier	Domingo	Lénie Vacher	Samuel Bambi
Channel	TF1															
Broadcast period	12 February 2011	8 October 2011	6 October 2012	28 September 2013	27 September 2014	24 October 2015	15 October 2016	14 October 2017	29 September 2018	21 September 2019	17 September 2021	9 September 2022	16 February 2024	9 March 2024	7 February 2025	23 January 2026
Broadcast period	19 March 2011	19 November 2011	1 December 2012	23 November 2013	29 November 2014	23 December 2015	16 December 2016	13 December 2017	1 December 2018	23 November 2019	26 November 2021	11 November 2022	26 April 2024	29 March 2024	25 April 2025	17 April 2026

Presenters
Names	Seasons																	
Names	1	2	3	CS	4	5	6	7	GS	8	9	10	11	12	13	DALSI	14	15
Vincent Cerutti																		
Sandrine Quétier																		
Laurent Ournac																		
Nikos Aliagas (week 1)																		
Christophe Dechavanne (week 2)
Laurence Boccolini (week 3)
Jean-Luc Reichmann (week 4)
Jean-Pierre Foucault (week 5)
Karine Ferri (week 6)																		
Arthur (week 7)																		
Carole Rousseau (week 8)
Denis Brogniart (week 9)
Christophe Beaugrand (week 10)
Camille Combal																		
Michou																		
Doigby																		

Host
Co-host
Competed as a contestant

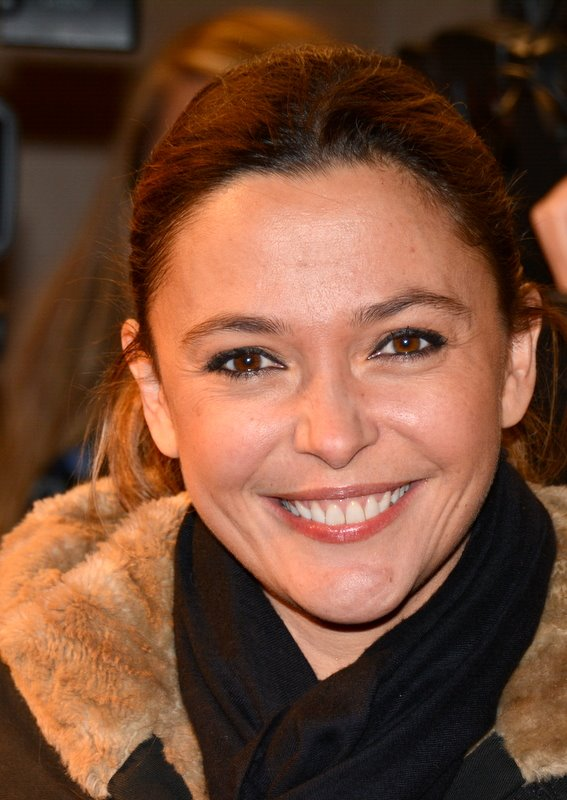
Sandrine Quétier

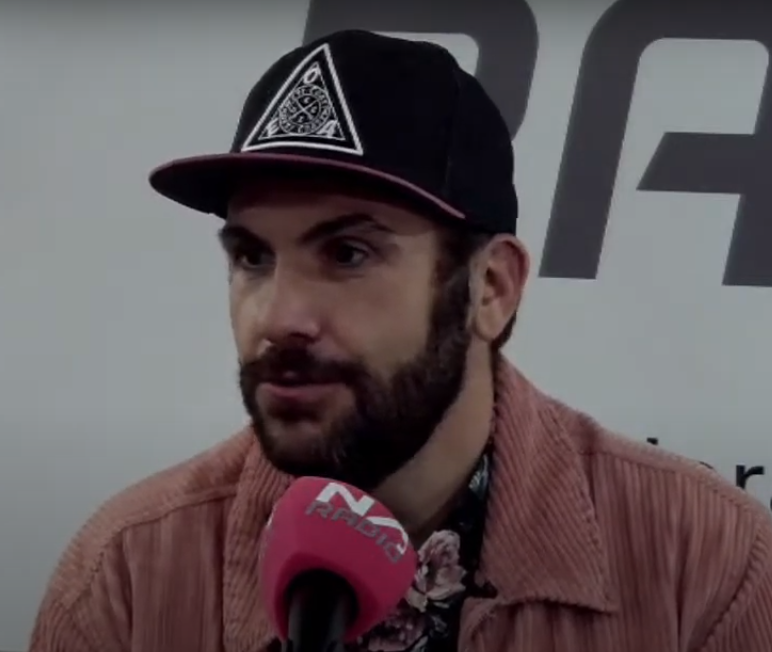
Laurent Ournac

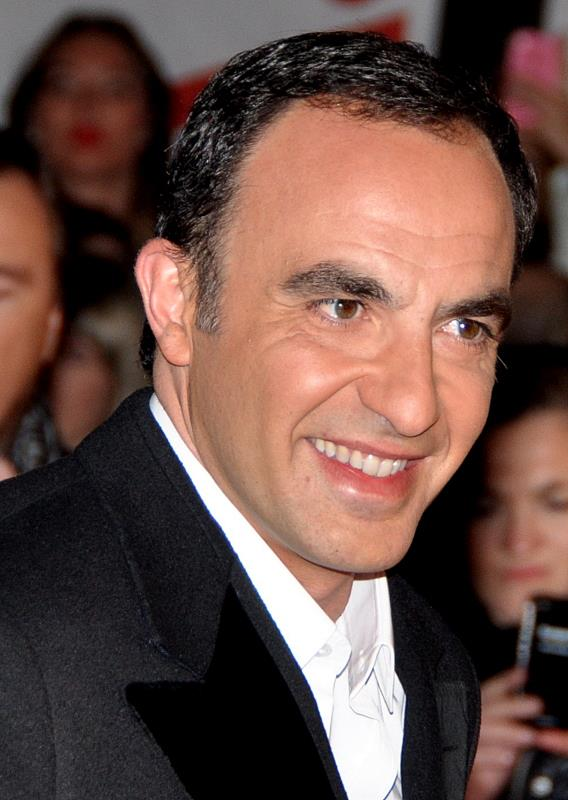
Nikos Aliagas

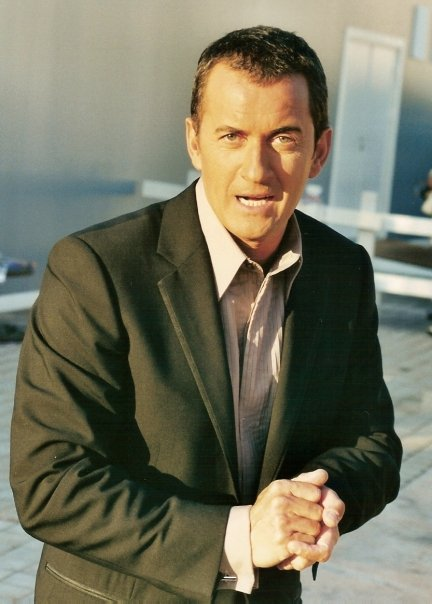
Christophe Dechavanne

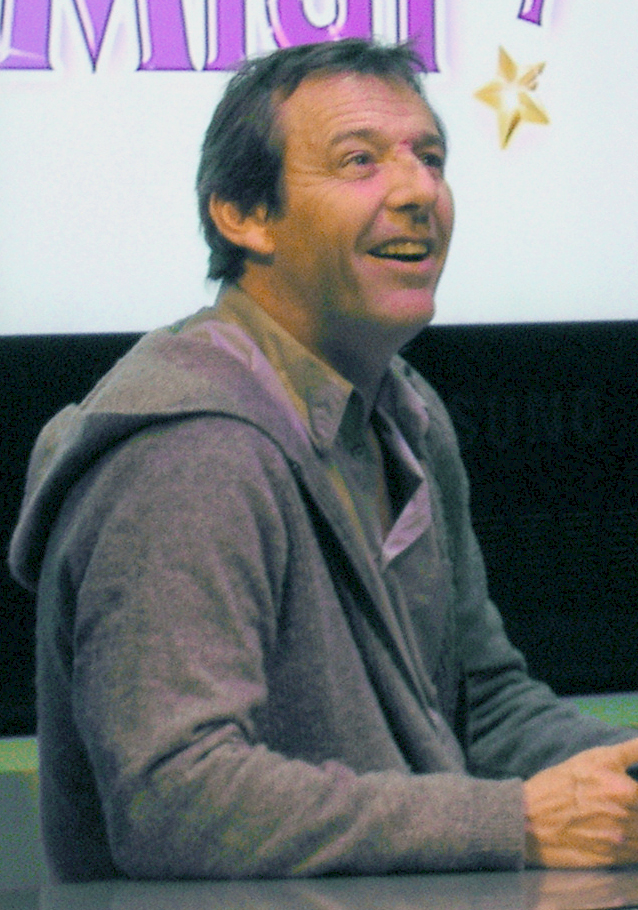
Jean-Luc Reichmann

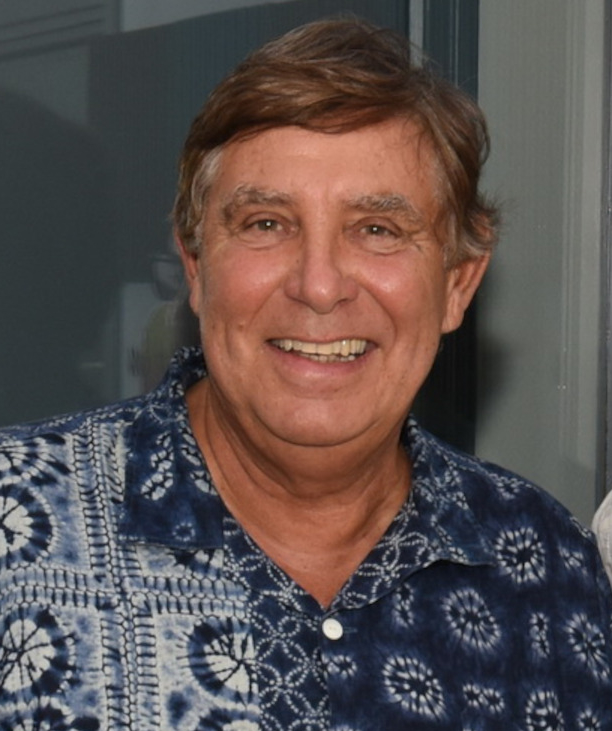
Jean-Pierre Foucault

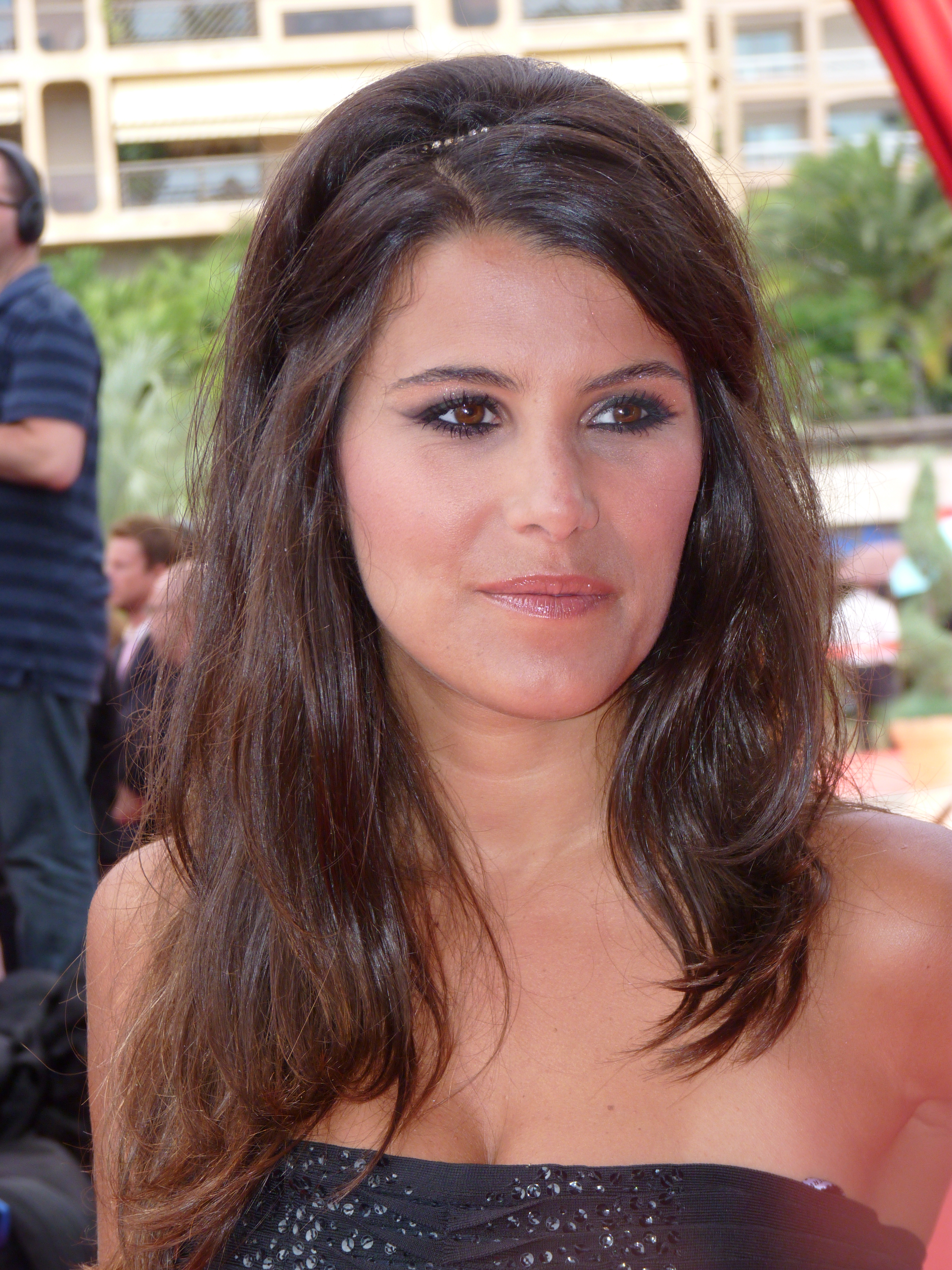
Karine Ferri

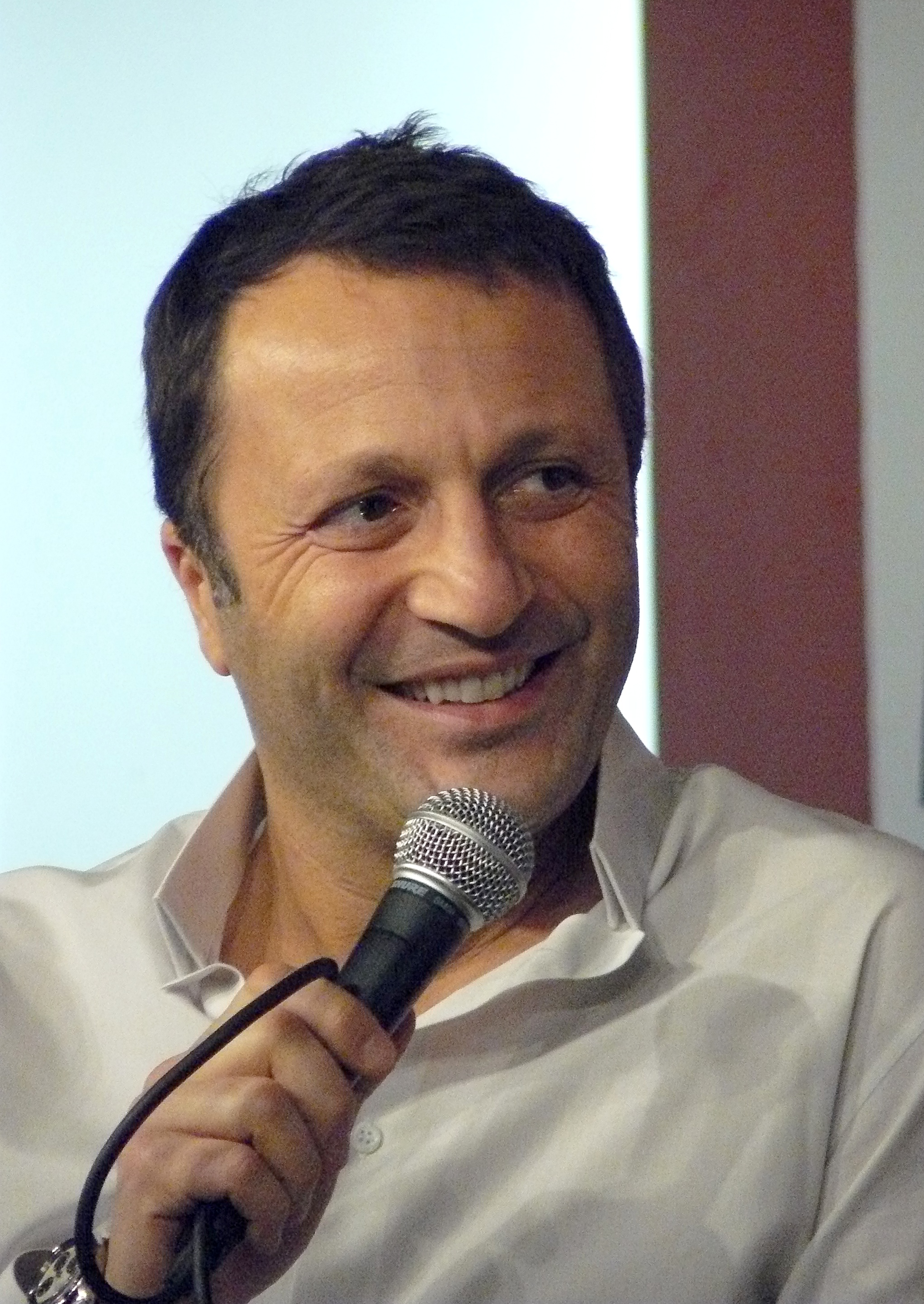
Arthur

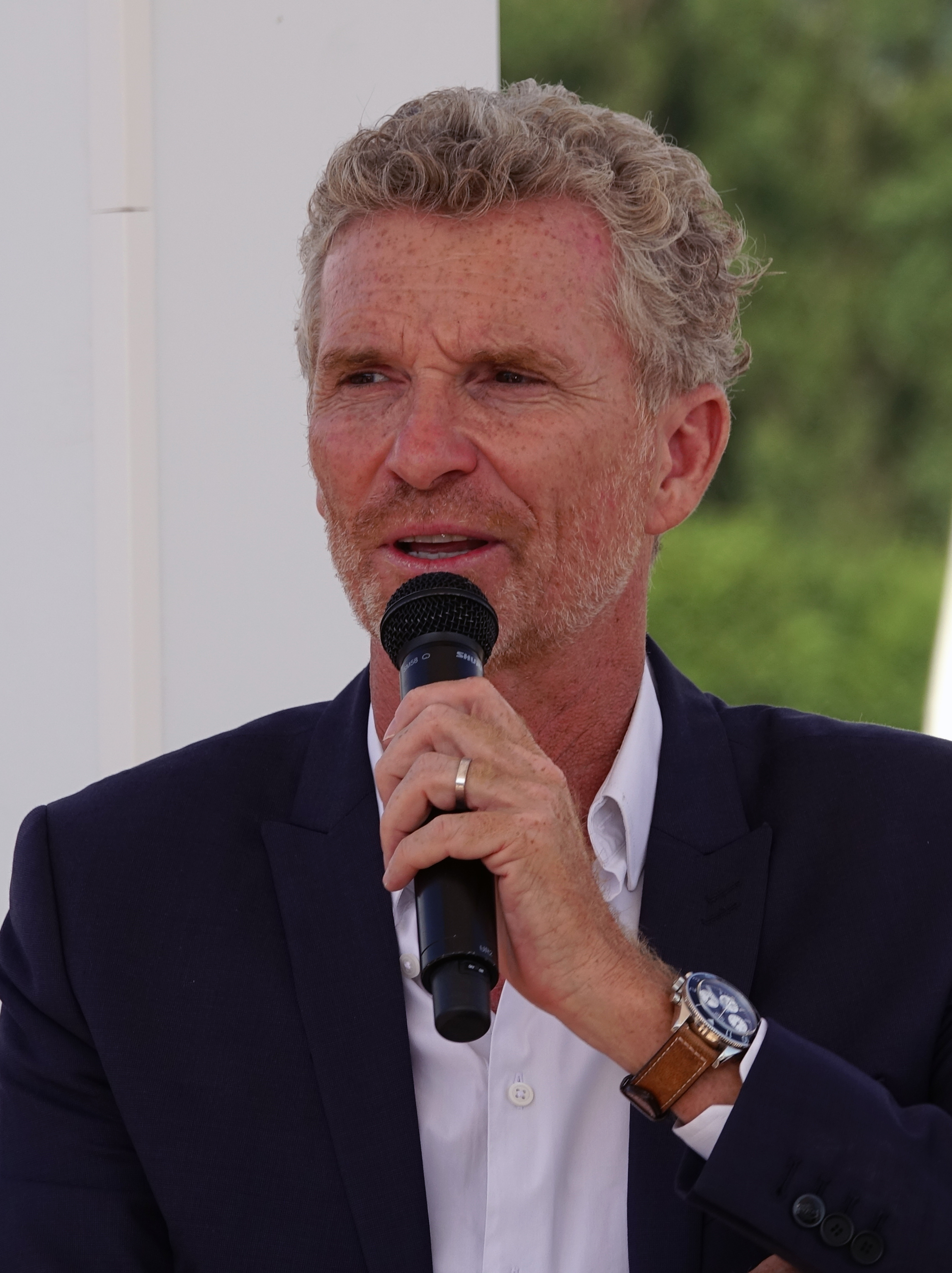
Denis Brogniart

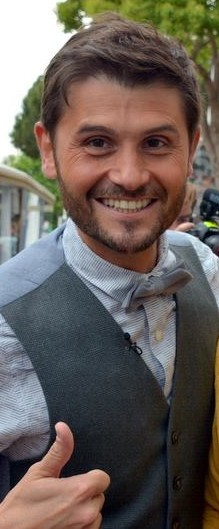
Christophe Beaugrand

Camille Combal

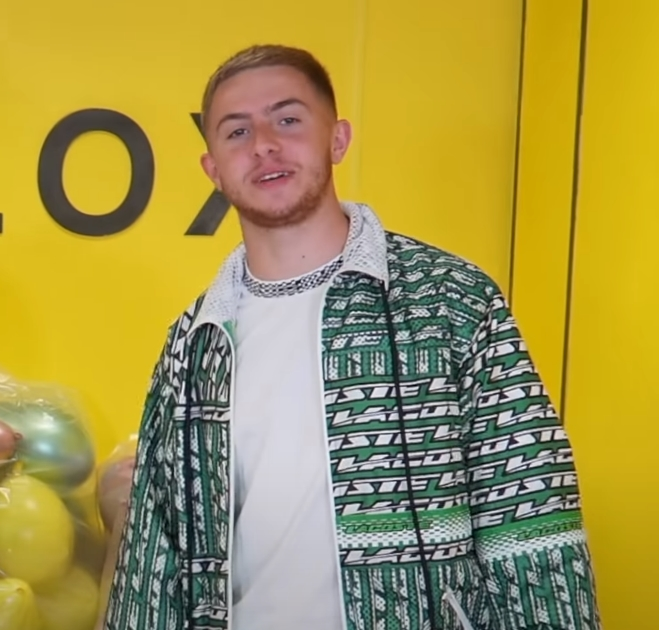
Michou

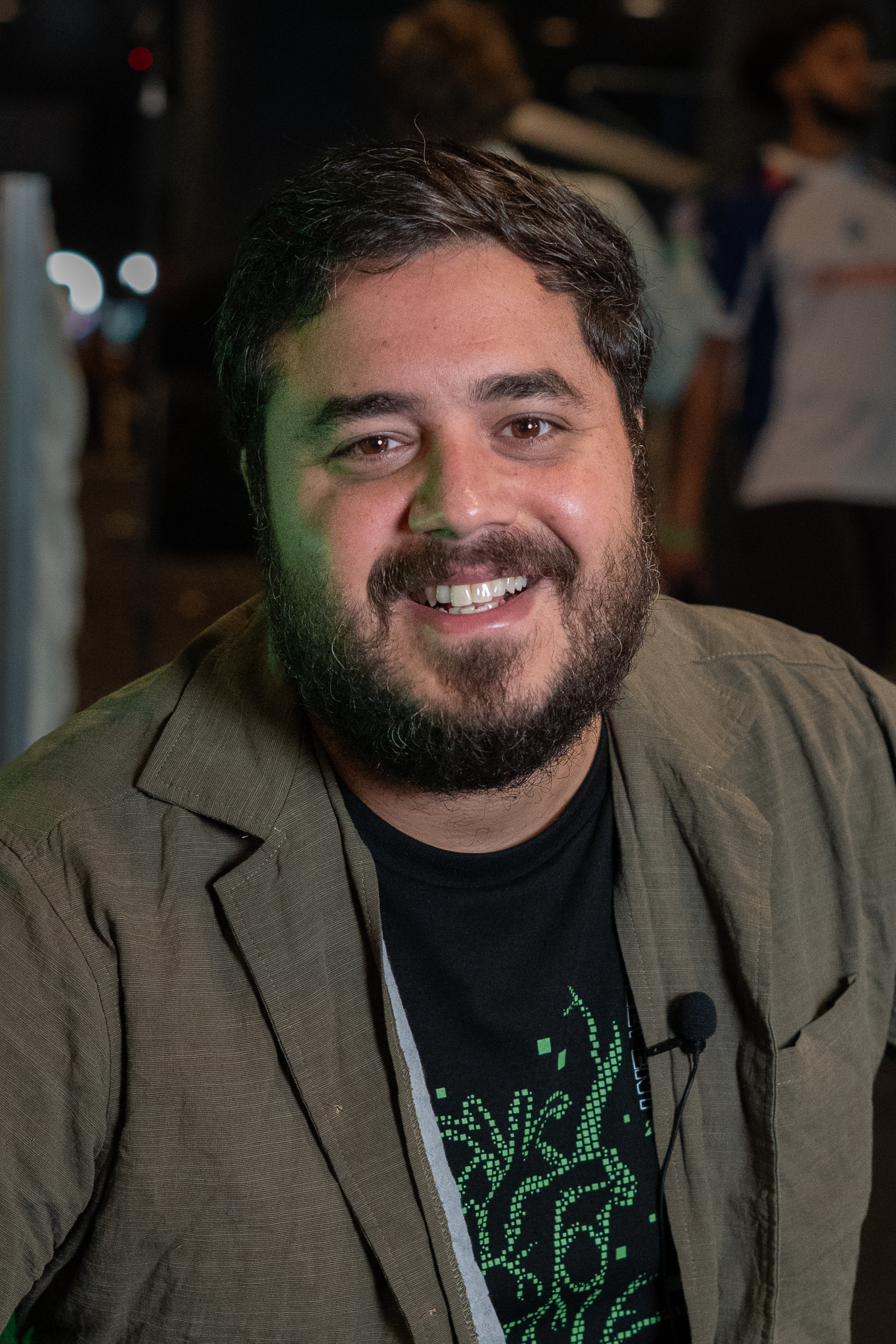
Doigby

== Judges ==
Judges
Names	Seasons																	
Names	1	2	3	CS	4	5	6	7	GS	8	9	10	11	12	13	DALSI	14	15
Alessandra Martines																		
Jean-Marc Généreux																		
Chris Marques																		
Marie-Claude Pietragalla																		
Shy'm																		
M. Pokora																		
Fauve Hautot																		
Nico Archambault																		
Patrick Dupond																		
Jean Paul Gaultier																		
Denitsa Ikonomova																		
François Alu																		
Bilal Hassani																		
Marie-Agnès Gillot																		
Mel Charlot																		
Carlito																		
Camille Combal																		
Kamel Ouali																		
Malika Benjelloun																		

Full time judge
Competed as a contestant
Guest judge
Host

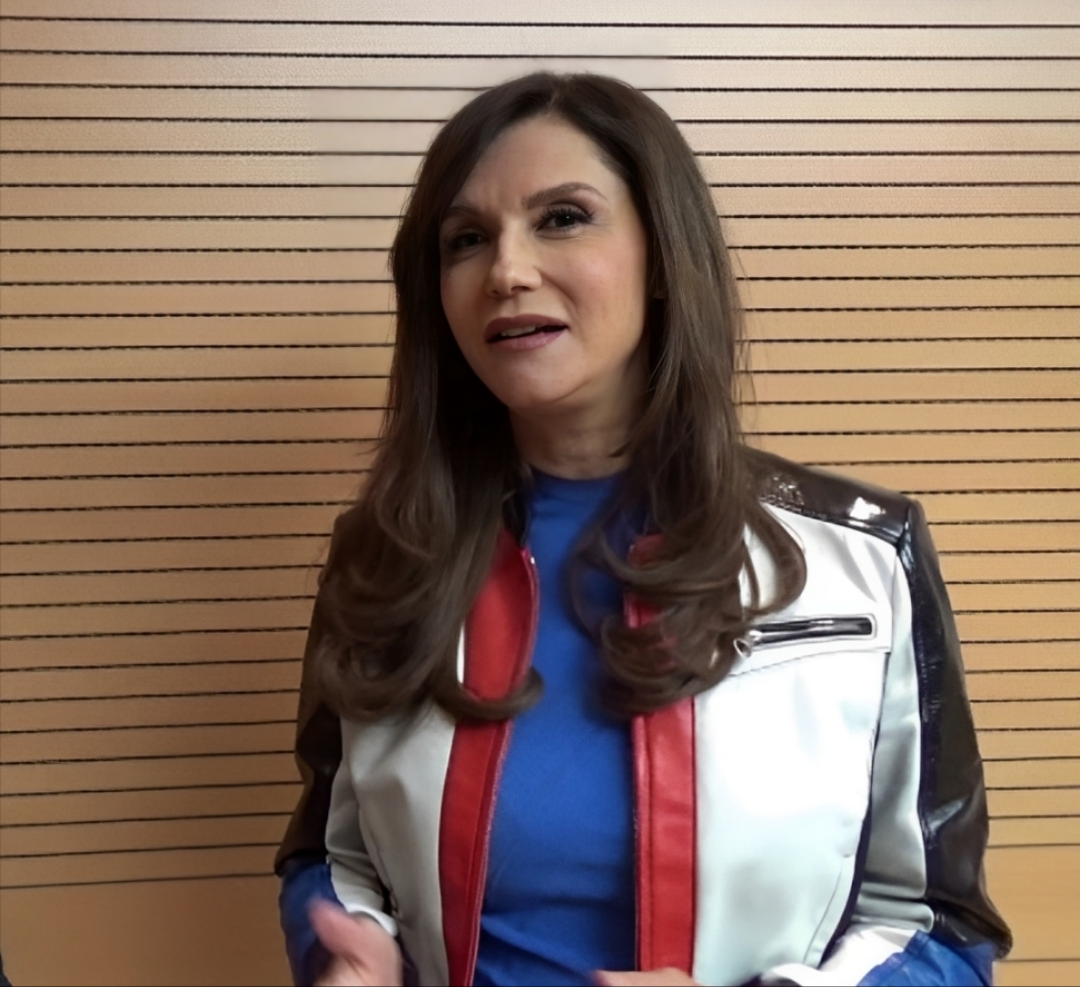
Alessandra Martines

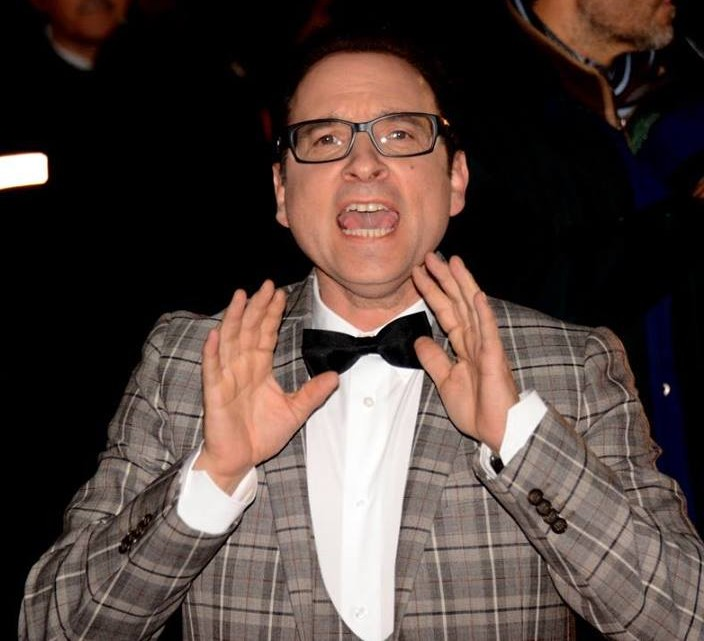
Jean-Marc Généreux

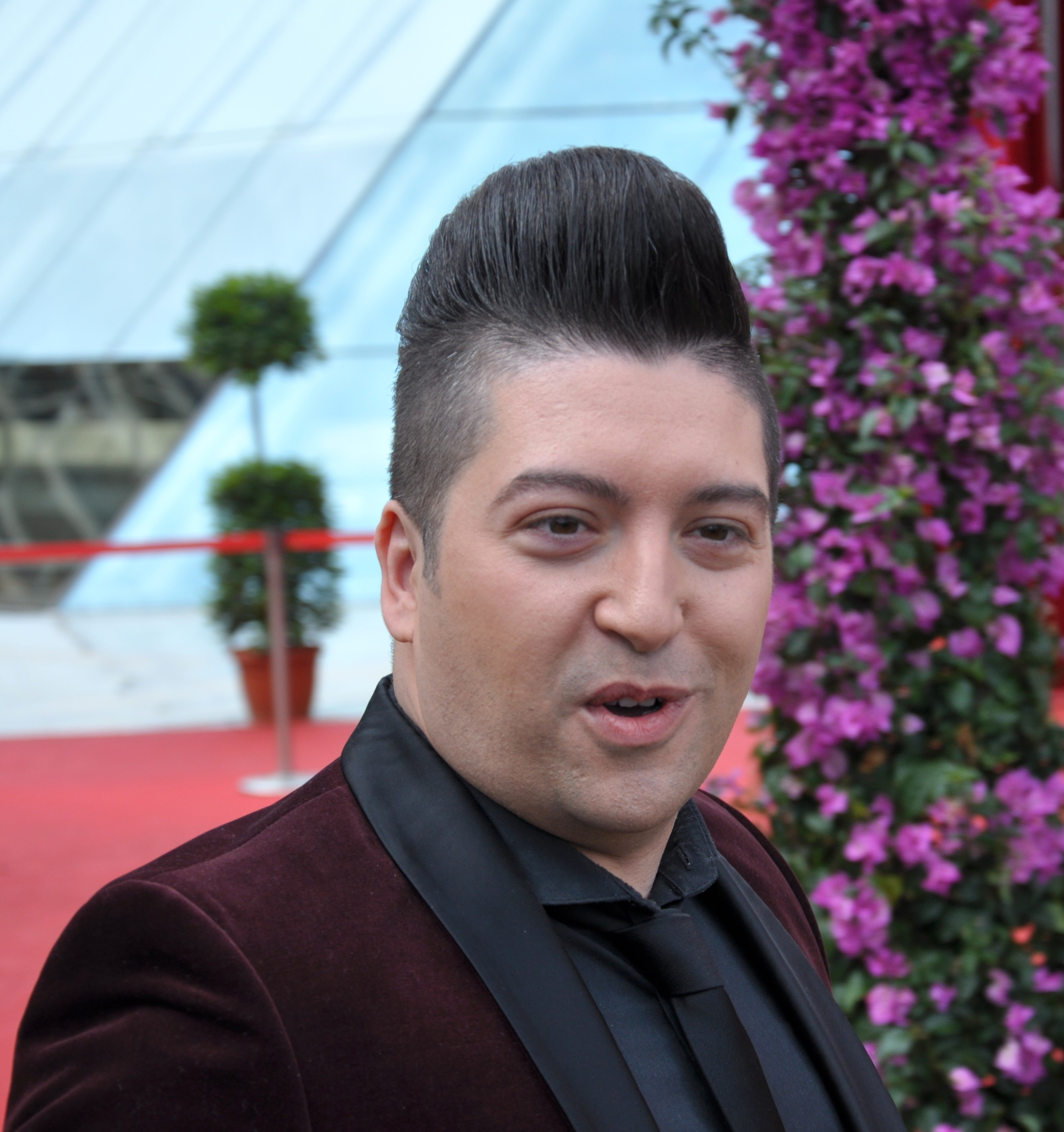
Chris Marques

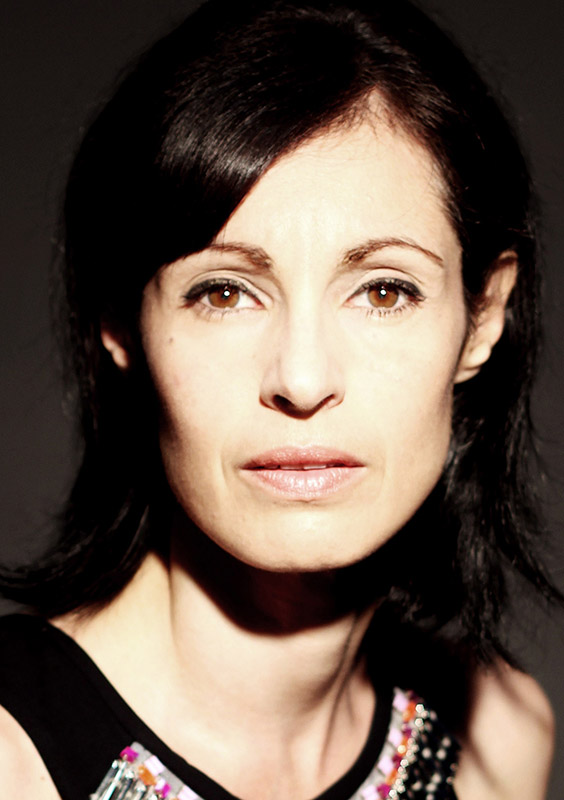
Marie-Claude Pietragalla

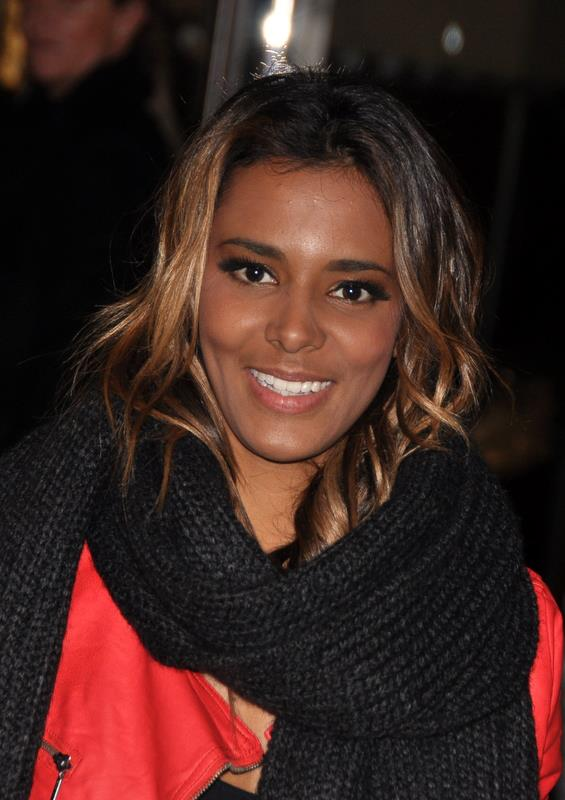
Shy'm

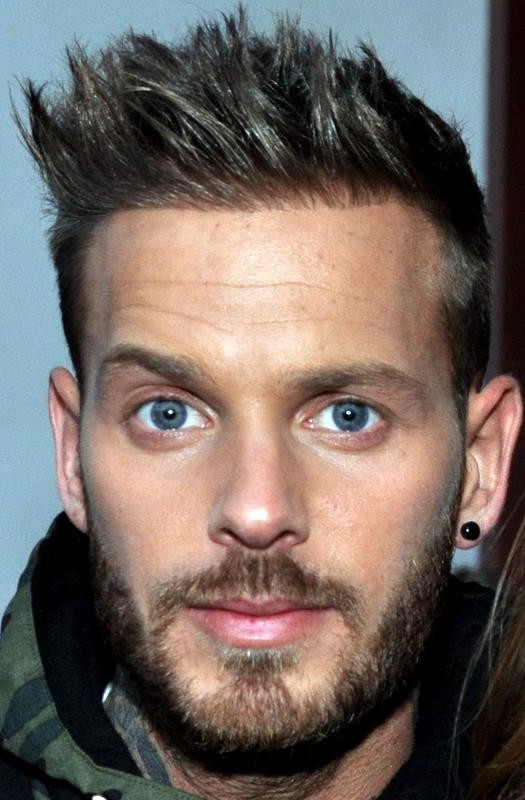
M. Pokora

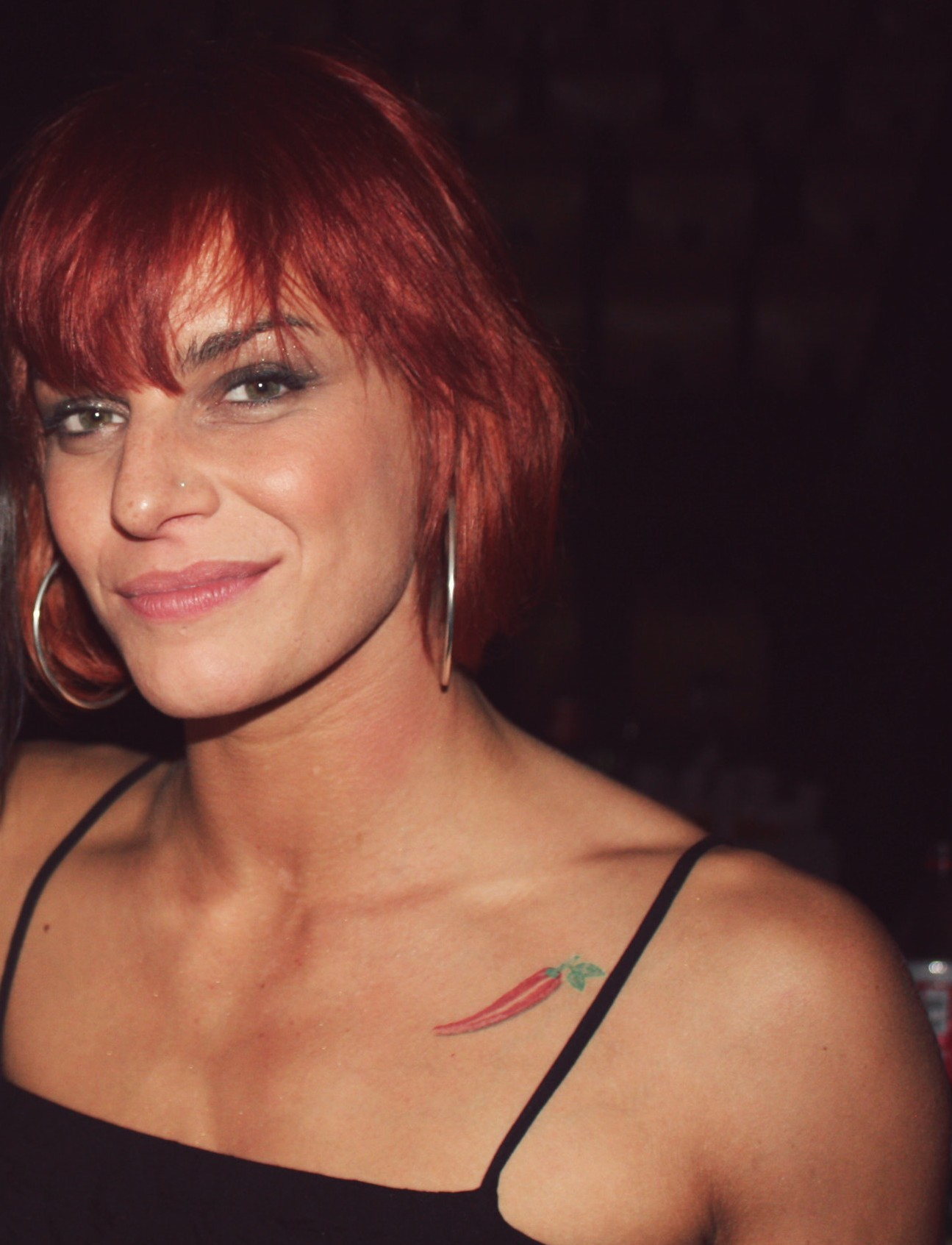
Fauve Hautot

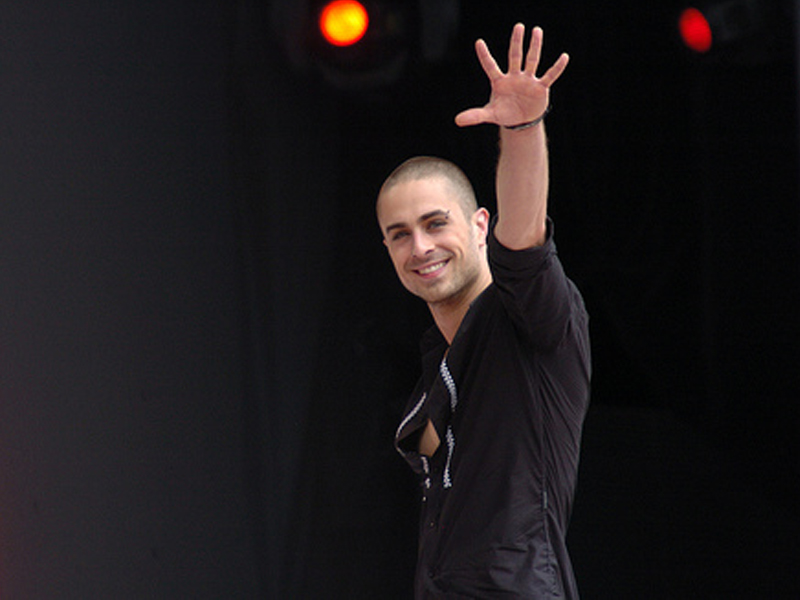
Nicolas Archambault

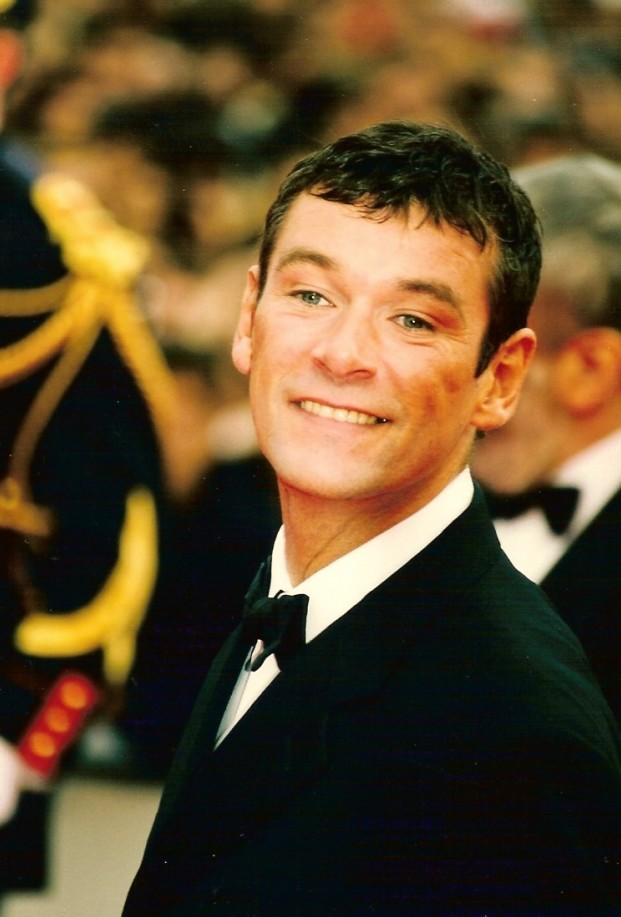
Patrick Dupond

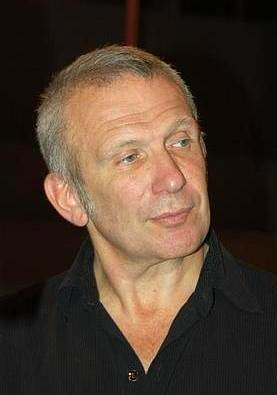
Jean-Paul Gaultier

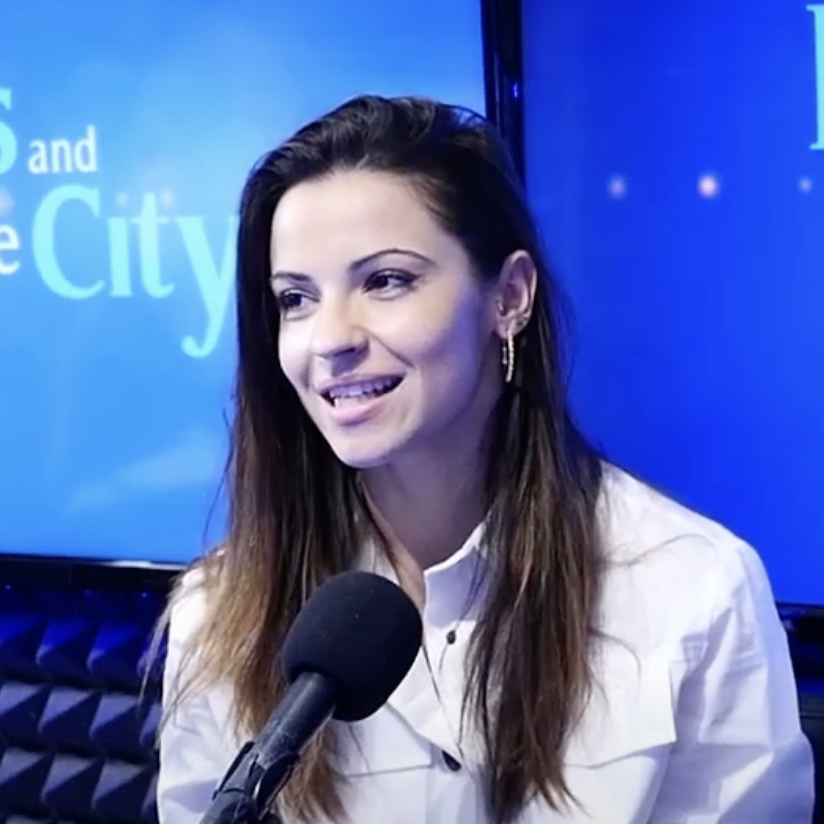
Denitsa Ikonomova

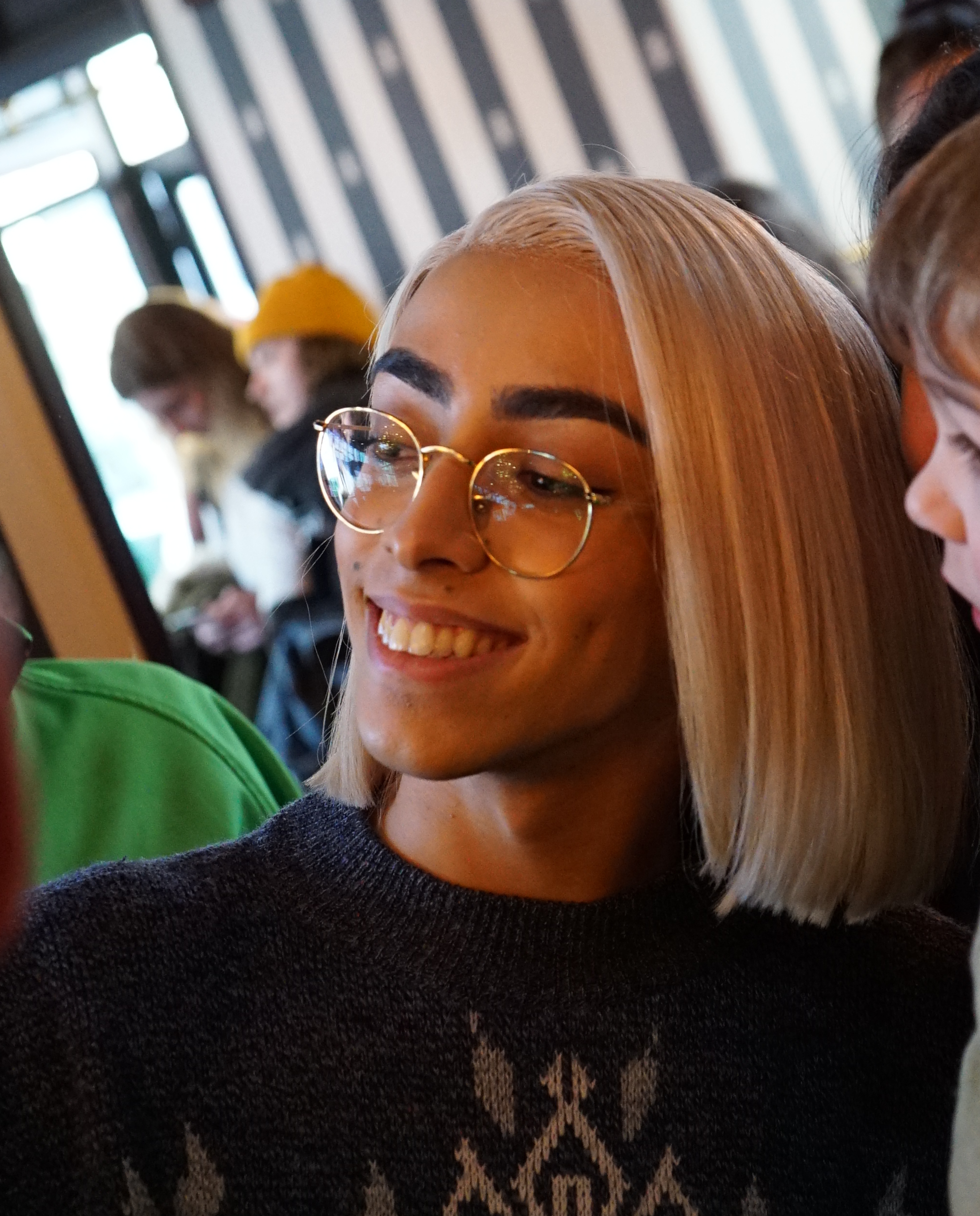
Bilal Hassani

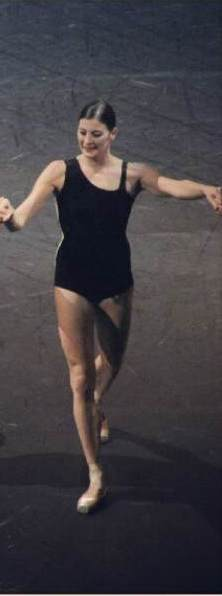
Marie-Agnès Gillot

Camille Combal

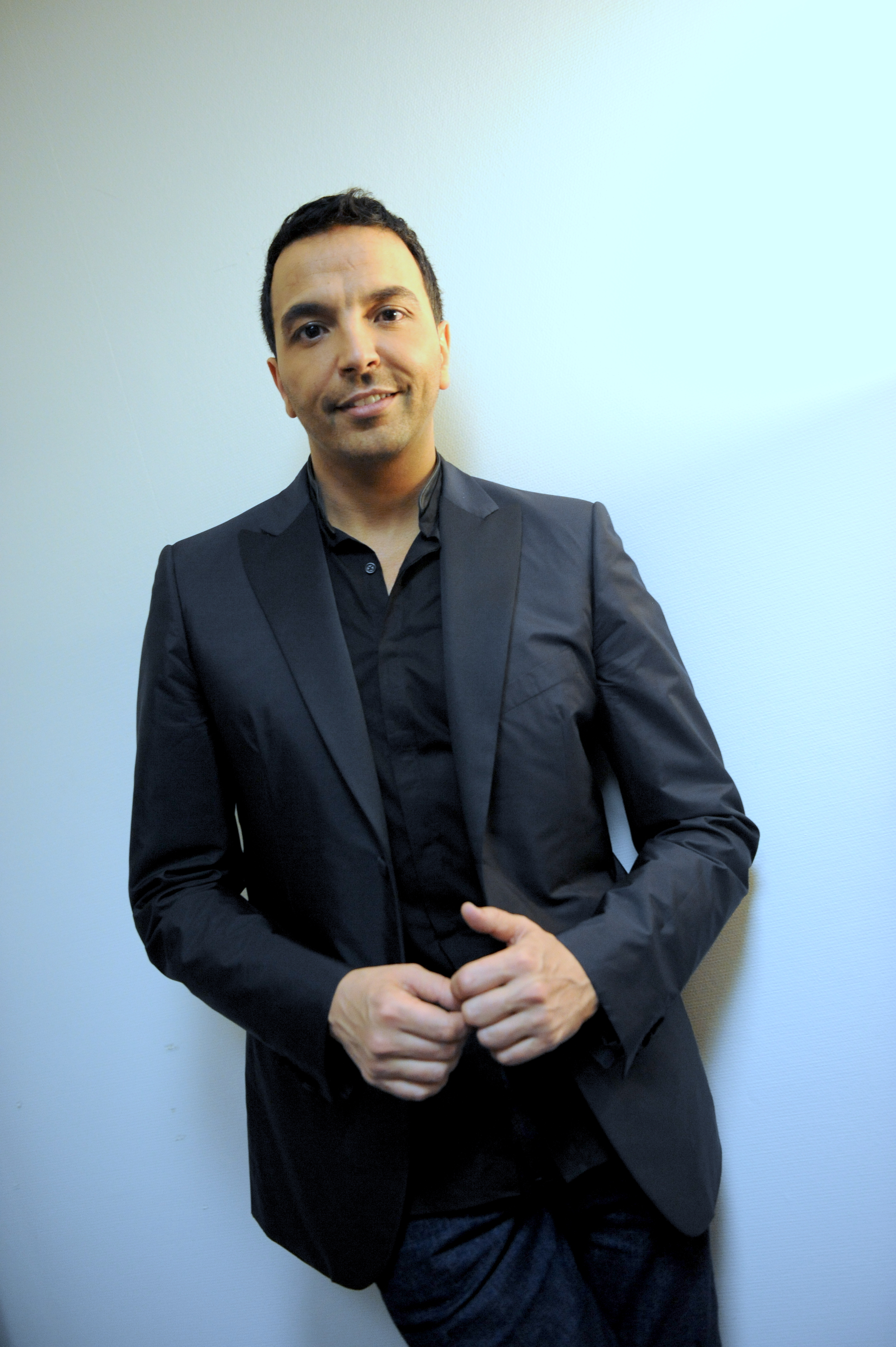
Kamel Ouali

== Couples ==
• Seasons

Professional	Season 1	Season 2	Season 3	Season 4	Season 5	Season 6	Season 7	Season 8	Season 9	Season 10	Season 11	Season 12	Season 13	Season 14	Season 15
Adrien Caby	—N/a										Aurélie Pons	Anggun	Adeline Toniutti	Julie Zenatti	Maghla
Alizée Bois	—N/a											Théo Fernandez	—N/a		
Ana Riera	—N/a												Roman Doduik	Adil Rami	Samuel Bambi
Anthony Colette	—N/a							Joy Esther	Iris Mittenaere	Elsa Esnoult	Lucie Lucas	Amandine Petit	Natasha St-Pier	—N/a	
Calisson Goasdoué	—N/a											Stéphane Legar	—N/a	Nelson Monfort	Stéphane Bern
Candice Pascal	André Manoukian	Philippe Candeloro	Christophe Dominici	Damien Sargue	Corneille	Olivier Dion	Florent Mothe	Agustín Galiana	Vincent Moscato	Hugo Philip	Gérémy Crédeville	Clémence Castel	James Denton	Frank Leboeuf	—N/a
Christian Millette	—N/a		Lorie	Noémie Lenoir	Élisa Tovati	Véronic Dicaire	Valérie Damidot	Élodie Gossuin	Lio	Liane Foly	Vaimalama Chaves	—N/a	Caroline Margeridon	—N/a	Laure Manaudou
Christophe Licata	Rossy de Palma	Nâdiya	Amel Bent	Laëtitia Milot	Ophélie Winter (wk 1–3)	Priscilla Betti	Sylvie Tellier	Tatiana Silva	Héloïse Martin	Linda Hardy	Dita Von Teese	Léa Elui	Inès Reg	Mayane	Lucie Bernardoni
Christophe Licata	Rossy de Palma	Nâdiya	Amel Bent	Laëtitia Milot	Nathalie Péchalat (wk 6–10)	Priscilla Betti	Sylvie Tellier	Tatiana Silva	Héloïse Martin	Linda Hardy	Dita Von Teese	Léa Elui	Inès Reg	Mayane	Lucie Bernardoni
Coralie Licata	—N/a										Moussa Niang	—N/a			
Denitsa Ikonomova	—N/a		Taïg Khris	Laurent Ournac	Rayane Bensetti	Loïc Nottet	Laurent Maistret	Sinclair	Clément Rémiens	Azize Diabaté	—N/a				Ian Ziering
Dorian Rollin	—N/a														Emma
Elsa Bois	—N/a										Michou	Thomas Da Costa	Black M	Florent Manaudou	Julien Lieb
Emmanuelle Berne	—N/a					Thierry Samitier	Kamel le Magicien	—N/a	Anouar Toubali	Yoann Riou	—N/a				
Fauve Hautot	Jean-Marie Bigard	Baptiste Giabiconi	Emmanuel Moire	Keen'V	Miguel Ángel Muñoz	—N/a			Terence Telle	Sami El Gueddari	Tayc	Billy Crawford	—N/a		
Grégoire Lyonnet	Marthe Mercadier	Véronique Jannot	Laura Flessel	Alizée	Nathalie Péchalat (weeks 1 to 5)	—N/a	Camille Lou	—N/a							
Grégory Guichard	—N/a	Valérie Bègue	—N/a												
Guillaume Foucault	—N/a				Louisy Joseph	—N/a									
Hajiba Fahmy	—N/a							Camille Lacourt	—N/a						
Inès Vandamme	—N/a									Ladji Doucouré	Jean-Baptiste Maunier	Florent Peyre	Nico Capone	Jungeli	—N/a
Joël Luzolo	—N/a										Lola Dubini	—N/a			
Jordan Mouillerac	—N/a							Hapsatou Sy	Carla Ginola	—N/a	Bilal Hassani	Eva Queen	Cristina Córdula	Lénie	Juju Fitcats
Julien Brugel	Adriana Karembeu	Sheila	Chimène Badi	—N/a	Joyce Jonathan	Fabienne Carat	—N/a								
Katrina Patchett	M. Pokora	Cédric Pioline	Bastian Baker	Brahim Zaibat	Brian Joubert	Vincent Niclo	Olivier Minne	Vincent Cerutti	Basile Boli	Moundir Zoughari	—N/a	David Douillet	—N/a	Claude Dartois	Philippe Lellouche
Marie Denigot	—N/a						Artus	Lenni-Kim	Jeanfi Janssens	—N/a					Marcus
Maxime Dereymez	Sofia Essaïdi	Shy'm	Estelle Lefébure	Laury Thilleman	Tonya Kinzinger	Sophie Vouzelaud	Caroline Receveur	Arielle Dombasle	Pamela Anderson	Clara Morgane	Lââm	—N/a	Keiona Revlon	—N/a	
Nicolas Archambault	—N/a												Cœur de pirate	Sophie Davant	—N/a
Nino Mosa	—N/a													Ève Gilles	—N/a
Pierre Mauduy	—N/a											Carla Lazzari	—N/a		
Samuel Texier	—N/a										Wejdene	—N/a			
Silvia Notargiacomo	David Ginola	Francis Lalanne	Gérard Vives	Titoff	Anthony Kavanagh	Djibril Cissé	Julien Lepers	—N/a							
Yann-Alrick Mortreuil	—N/a			Tal	—N/a	EnjoyPhoenix	Karine Ferri	—N/a					Diane Leyre	Charlotte de Turckheim	Angélique Angarni-Filopon

• Spin-offs & Specials

Professional	Special Christmas 2012	Le grand show 2017	Danse avec les stars d'Internet
Alizée Bois			LeBouseuh
Anthony Colette			Natoo
Candice Pascal	Philippe Candeloro	Baptiste Giabiconi	
Candice Pascal	Philippe Candeloro	Philippe Candeloro	
Christian Millette	Lorie		Baghera Jones
Christophe Licata	Amel Bent		
Denitsa Ikonomova	Taïg Khris	Laurent Ournac	
Denitsa Ikonomova	Taïg Khris	Loïc Nottet	
Denitsa Ikonomova	Taïg Khris	Laurent Maistret	
Elsa Bois			Nico-Tine
Fauve Hautot	Baptiste Giabiconi		
Fauve Hautot	Emmanuel Moire		
Grégoire Lyonnet		Alizée	
Grégoire Lyonnet		Camille Lou	
Inès Vandamme			Domingo
Jordan Mouillerac			Gaëlle Garcia Diaz
Katrina Patchett	M. Pokora	Brian Joubert	
Maxime Dereymez	Sofia Essaïdi	Shy'm	
Maxime Dereymez	Sofia Essaïdi	Tonya Kinzinger	
Silvia Notargiacomo	Francis Lalanne	Brian Joubert	
Yann-Alrick Mortreuil		Tal	
Yann-Alrick Mortreuil		Karine Ferri	

Winner of the season
Runner-up of the season
Third place of the season
Last place of the season
Withdrew in the season
Participating in current season
Absent

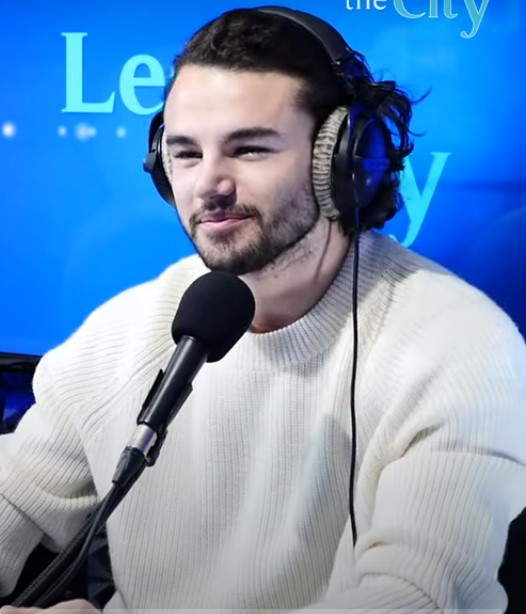
Anthony Colette

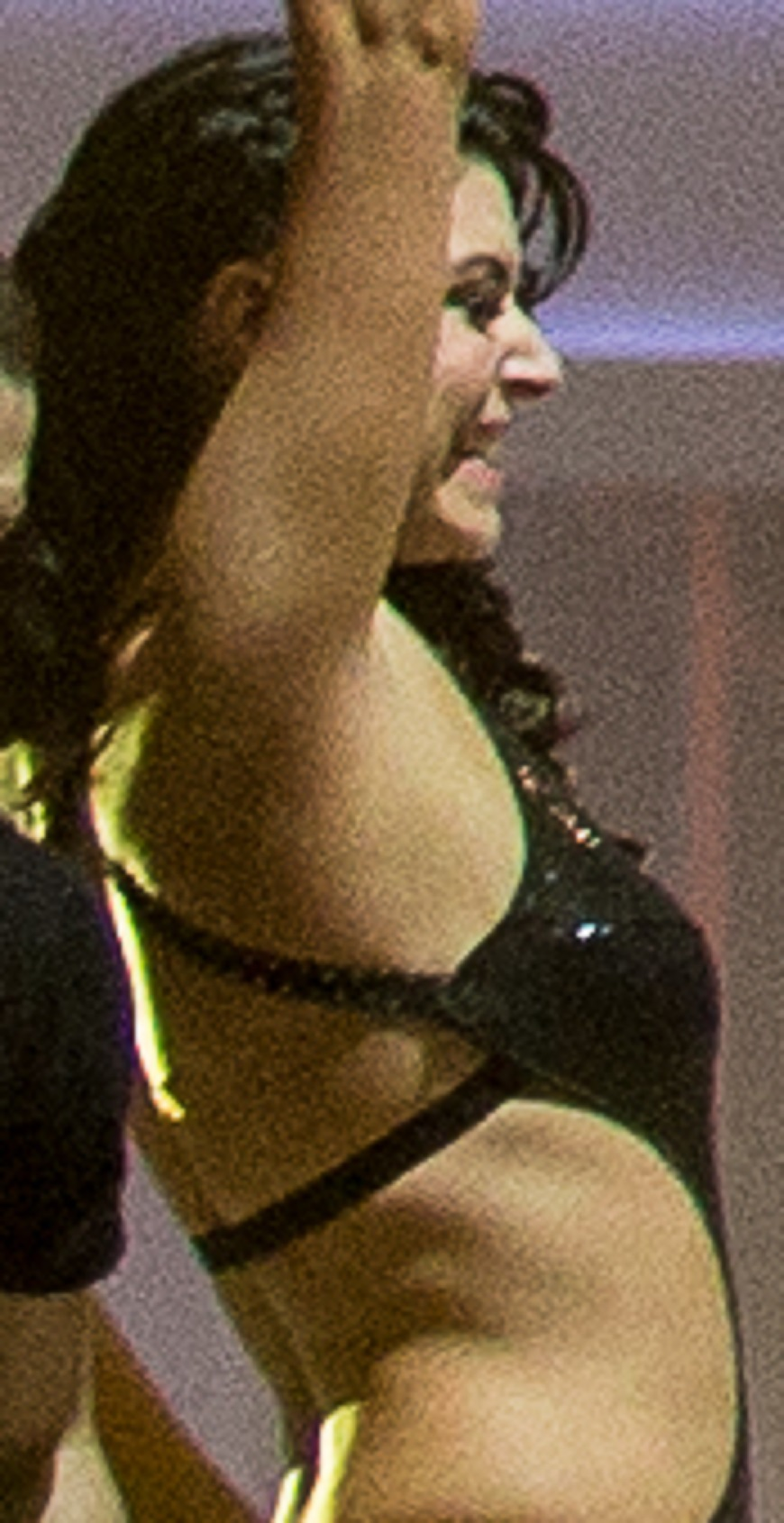
Candice Pascal

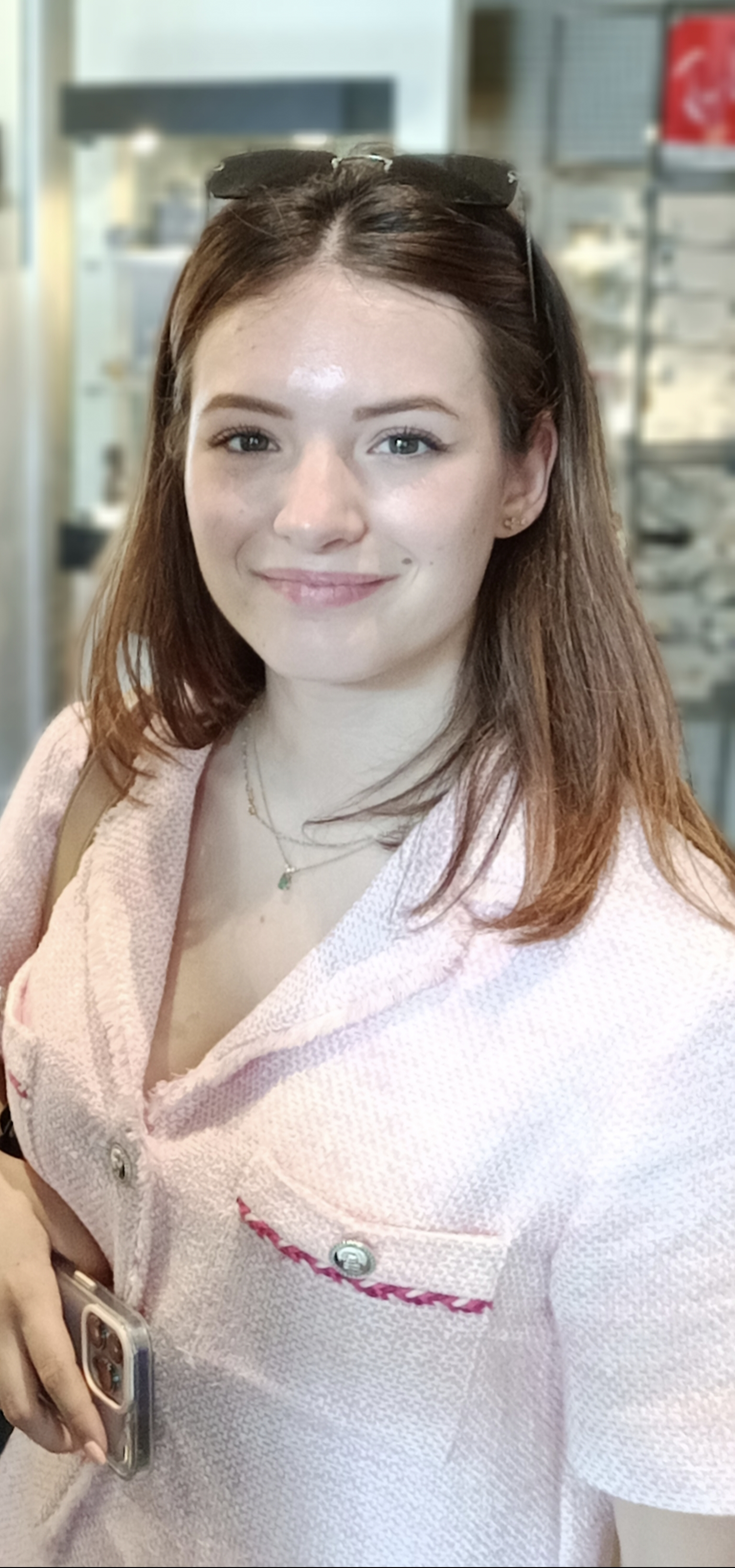
Elsa Bois

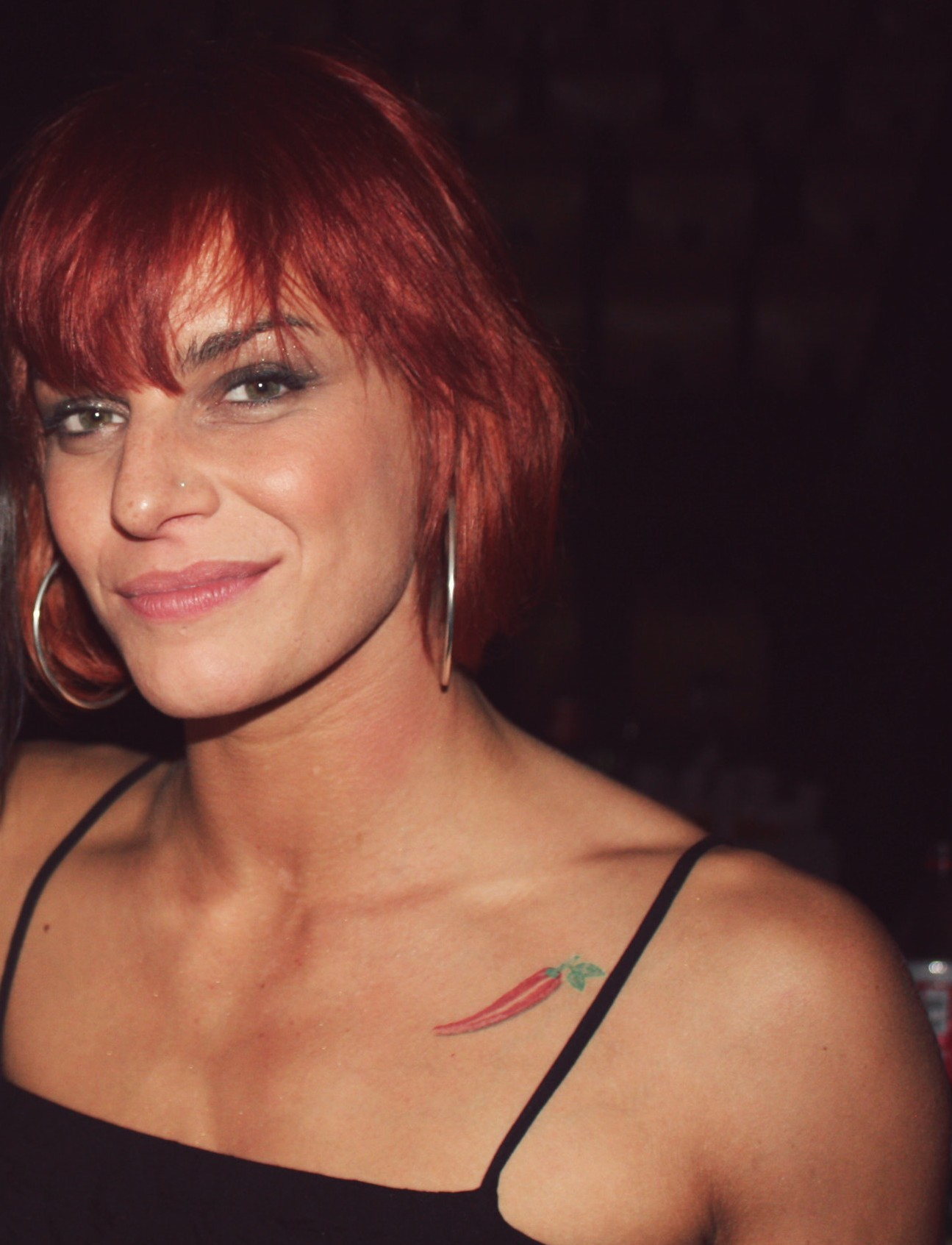
Fauve Hautot

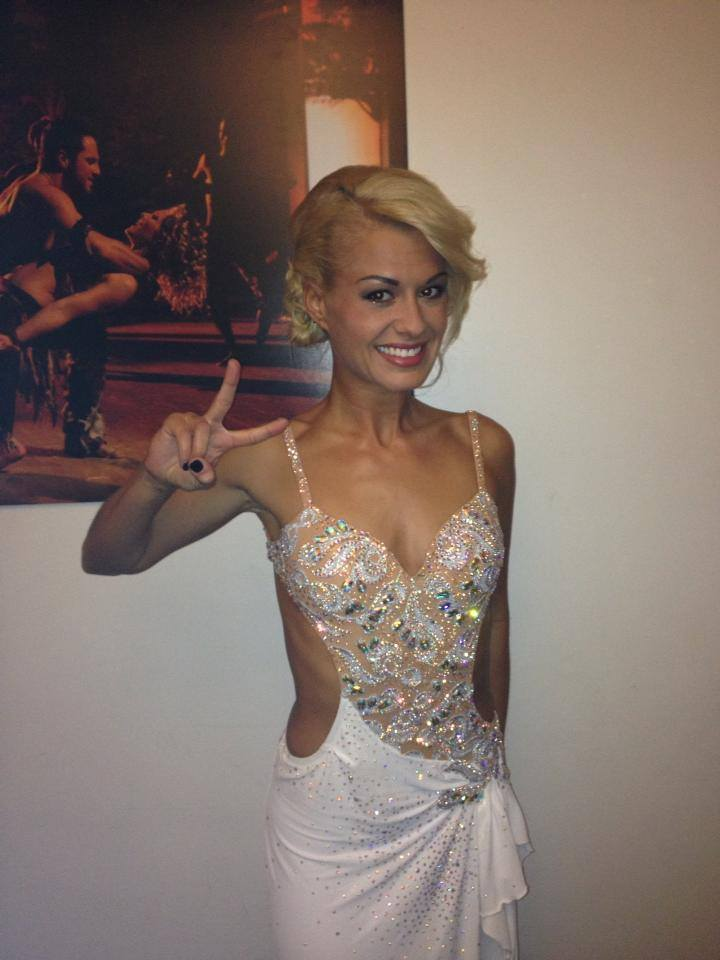
Katrina Patchett

== Statistics ==
=== Ranking of best candidates ===
Ranking	Season	Place during the season	Stars	Partners	Total	Average (/40)
1	14	1	Lénie	Jordan Mouillerac	407	37.00
2	6	1	Loïc Nottet	Denitsa Ikonomova	810	36.82
3	12	1	Billy Crawford	Fauve Hautot	327	36.33
4	8	2	Lenni-Kim	Marie Denigot	800	35.96
5	7	1	Laurent Maistret	Denitsa Ikonomova	866	35.71
6	5	2	Nathalie Péchalat	Grégoire Lyonnet / Christophe Licata	927	35.65
7	1	1	M. Pokora	Katrina Patchett	347	35.59
8	4	2	Brahim Zaibat	Katrina Patchett	888	35.52
9	8	1	Agustín Galiana	Candice Pascal	788	35.42
10	15	2	Juju Fitcats	Jordan Mouillerac	424	35.33
11	7	2	Camille Lou	Grégoire Lyonnet	851	35.09
12	1	2	Sofia Essaïdi	Maxime Dereymez	342	35.08
13	6	2	Priscilla Betti	Christophe Licata	770	35.00
14	3	2	Amel Bent	Christophe Licata	835	34.79
15	14	3	Adil Rami	Ana Riera	415	34.58
16	15	1	Samuel Bambi	Ana Riera	414	34.50
17	4	1	Alizée	Grégoire Lyonnet	859	34.36
18	10	1	Sami El Gueddari	Fauve Hautot	402	34.21
19	5	5	Tonya Kinzinger	Maxime Dereymez	580	34.12
20	11	2	Bilal Hassani	Jordan Mouillerac	408	34.00
21	11	1	Tayc	Fauve Hautot	373	33.91
22	2	1	Shy'm	Maxime Dereymez	483	33.89
23	14	4	Jungeli	Inès Vandamme	338	33.80
24	13	3	Inès Reg	Christophe Licata	295	33.71
25	5	1	Rayane Bensetti	Denitsa Ikonomova	875	33.65
26	6	5	Véronic DiCaire	Christian Millette	484	33.38
27	3	4	Lorie	Christian Millette	664	33.20
28	7	3	Artus	Marie Denigot	804	33.15
29	12	2	Carla Lazzari	Pierre Mauduy	298	33.11
30	8	3	Tatiana Silva	Christophe Licata	731	32.85
31	3	1	Emmanuel Moire	Fauve Hautot	788	32.83
32	13	4	Keiona Revlon	Maxime Dereymez	254	32.77
33	5	3	Brian Joubert	Katrina Patchett	850	32.69
34	6	3	Olivier Dion	Candice Pascal	718	32.64
35	9	1	Clément Rémiens	Denitsa Ikonomova	382	32.51
36	7	6	Caroline Receveur	Maxime Dereymez	414	32.47
36	9	3	Terence Telle	Fauve Hautot	349	32.47
38	14	2	Florent Manaudou	Elsa Bois	389	32.42
39	12	3	Stéphane Legar	Calisson Goasdoué	291	32.33
40	7	5	Florent Mothe	Candice Pascal	541	32.30
41	15	3	Emma	Dorian Rollin	387	32.25
42	11	5	Dita Von Teese	Christophe Licata	223	31.86
43	10	6	Clara Morgane	Maxime Dereymez	191	31.83
43	9	2	Iris Mittenaere	Anthony Colette	374	31.83
45	8	5	Joy Esther	Anthony Colette	469	31.80
46	15	4	Lucie Bernardoni	Christophe Licata	286	31.78
47	5	4	Miguel Ángel Muñoz	Fauve Hautot	664	31.62
48	15	6	Marcus	Marie Denigot	252	31.50
49	2	3	Baptiste Giabiconi	Fauve Hautot	447	31.37
50	9	8	Lio	Christian Millette	124	31.00

Female

Ranking	Season	Place during the season	Stars	Partners	Total	Average (/40)
1	14	1	Lénie	Jordan Mouillerac	407	37.00
2	5	2	Nathalie Péchalat	Grégoire Lyonnet / Christophe Licata	927	35.65
3	15	2	Juju Fitcats	Jordan Mouillerac	424	35.33
4	7	2	Camille Lou	Grégoire Lyonnet	851	35.09
5	1	2	Sofia Essaïdi	Maxime Dereymez	342	35.08
6	6	2	Priscilla Betti	Christophe Licata	770	35.00
7	3	2	Amel Bent	Christophe Licata	835	34.79
8	4	1	Alizée	Grégoire Lyonnet	859	34.36
9	5	5	Tonya Kinzinger	Maxime Dereymez	580	34.12
10	2	1	Shy'm	Maxime Dereymez	483	33.89

Male

Ranking	Season	Place during the season	Stars	Partners	Total	Average (/40)
1	6	1	Loïc Nottet	Denitsa Ikonomova	810	36.82
2	12	1	Billy Crawford	Fauve Hautot	327	36.33
3	8	2	Lenni-Kim	Marie Denigot	800	35.96
4	7	1	Laurent Maistret	Denitsa Ikonomova	866	35.71
5	1	1	M. Pokora	Katrina Patchett	347	35.59
6	4	2	Brahim Zaibat	Katrina Patchett	888	35.52
7	8	1	Agustín Galiana	Candice Pascal	788	35.42
8	14	3	Adil Rami	Ana Riera	415	34.58
9	15	1	Samuel Bambi	Ana Riera	414	34.50
10	10	1	Sami El Gueddari	Fauve Hautot	402	34.21

Winners

Ranking	Season	Stars	Partners	Total	Average (/40)
1	14	Lénie	Jordan Mouillerac	407	37.00
2	6	Loïc Nottet	Denitsa Ikonomova	810	36.82
3	12	Billy Crawford	Fauve Hautot	327	36.33
4	7	Laurent Maistret	Denitsa Ikonomova	866	35.71
5	1	M. Pokora	Katrina Patchett	347	35.59
6	8	Agustín Galiana	Candice Pascal	788	35.42
7	15	Samuel Bambi	Ana Riera	414	34.50
8	4	Alizée	Grégoire Lyonnet	859	34.36
9	10	Sami El Gueddari	Fauve Hautot	402	34.21
10	11	Tayc	Fauve Hautot	373	33.91
11	2	Shy'm	Maxime Dereymez	483	33.89
12	5	Rayane Bensetti	Denitsa Ikonomova	875	33.65
13	3	Emmanuel Moire	Fauve Hautot	788	32.83
14	9	Clément Rémiens	Denitsa Ikonomova	382	32.51
15	13	Natasha St-Pier	Anthony Colette	264	30.17

Winners by percentage of vote

Ranking	Season	Stars	Partners	Percentage of vote	Second place Stars	Second place Partners
1	14	Lénie	Jordan Mouillerac	69%	Florent Manaudou	Elsa Bois
2	6	Loïc Nottet	Denitsa Ikonomova	68%	Priscilla Betti	Christophe Licata
3	2	Shy'm	Maxime Dereymez	65%	Philippe Candeloro	Candice Pascal
4	1	M. Pokora	Katrina Patchett	62%	Sofia Essaïdi	Maxime Dereymez
4	10	Sami El Gueddari	Fauve Hautot	62%	Ladji Doucouré	Inès Vandamme
6	9	Clément Rémiens	Denitsa Ikonomova	60%	Iris Mittenaere	Anthony Colette
7	3	Emmanuel Moire	Fauve Hautot	57%	Amel Bent	Christophe Licata
7	13	Natasha St-Pier	Anthony Colette	57%	Nico Capone	Inès Vandamme
9	11	Tayc	Fauve Hautot	56%	Bilal Hassani	Jordan Mouillerac
10	4	Alizée	Grégoire Lyonnet	55%	Brahim Zaibat	Katrina Patchett
11	7	Laurent Maistret	Denitsa Ikonomova	54%	Camille Lou	Grégoire Lyonnet
12	12	Billy Crawford	Fauve Hautot	53.5%	Carla Lazzari	Pierre Mauduy
13	15	Samuel Bambi	Ana Riera	53%	Juju Fitcats	Jordan Mouillerac
14	5	Rayane Bensetti	Denitsa Ikonomova	52%	Nathalie Péchalat	Grégoire Lyonnet / Christophe Licata
15	8	Agustín Galiana	Candice Pascal	50.33%	Lenni-Kim	Marie Denigot

Best Average by season

Ranking	Season	Place during the season	Stars	Partners	Total	Average (/40)
1	14	1	Lénie	Jordan Mouillerac	407	37.00
2	6	1	Loïc Nottet	Denitsa Ikonomova	810	36.82
3	12	1	Billy Crawford	Fauve Hautot	327	36.33
4	8	2	Lenni-Kim	Marie Denigot	800	35.96
5	7	1	Laurent Maistret	Denitsa Ikonomova	866	35.71
6	5	2	Nathalie Péchalat	Grégoire Lyonnet / Christophe Licata	927	35.65
7	1	1	M. Pokora	Katrina Patchett	347	35.59
8	4	2	Brahim Zaibat	Katrina Patchett	888	35.52
9	15	2	Juju Fitcats	Jordan Mouillerac	424	35.33
10	3	2	Amel Bent	Christophe Licata	835	34.79
11	10	1	Sami El Gueddari	Fauve Hautot	402	34.21
12	11	2	Bilal Hassani	Jordan Mouillerac	408	34.00
13	2	1	Shy'm	Maxime Dereymez	483	33.89
14	13	3	Inès Reg	Christophe Licata	295	33.71
15	9	1	Clément Rémiens	Denitsa Ikonomova	382	32.51

=== Ranking of worst candidates ===
Ranking	Season	Place during the season	Stars	Partners	Total	Average (/40)
1	14	12	Nelson Monfort	Calisson Goasdoué	32	16.00
2	2	9	Cédric Pioline	Katrina Patchett	13	17.33
3	6	9	Thierry Samitier	Emmanuelle Berne	71	17.75
4	13	12	Caroline Margeridon	Christian Millette	36	18.00
5	12	11	Théo Fernandez	Alizée Bois	19	19.00
5	13	11	Cœur de pirate	Nicolas Archambault	57	19.00
7	1	6	Marthe Mercadier	Grégoire Lyonnet	44	19.56
8	9	9	Vincent Moscato	Candice Pascal	59	19.67
9	1	8	André Manoukian	Candice Pascal	15	20.00
9	11	13	Lââm	Maxime Dereymez	20	20.00
9	12	10	Clémence Castel	Candice Pascal	40	20.00
12	2	8	Nâdiya	Christophe Licata	31	20.67
12	5	9	Joyce Jonathan	Julien Brugel	124	20.67
12	14	11	Sophie Davant	Nicolas Archambault	62	20.67
15	10	7	Yoann Riou	Emmanuelle Berne	106	21.20
16	9	6	Jeanfi Janssens	Marie Denigot	128	21.33
17	8	10	Vincent Cerutti	Katrina Patchett	44	22.00
17	11	12	Lola Dubini	Joel Luzolo	22	22.00
17	15	12	Philippe Lellouche	Katrina Patchett	44	22.00
20	8	6	Camille Lacourt	Hajiba Fahmy	249	23.16

Female

Ranking	Season	Place during the season	Stars	Partners	Total	Average (/40)
1	13	12	Caroline Margeridon	Christian Millette	36	18.00
2	13	11	Cœur de pirate	Nicolas Archambault	57	19.00
3	1	6	Marthe Mercadier	Grégoire Lyonnet	44	19.56
4	11	13	Lââm	Maxime Dereymez	20	20.00
4	12	10	Clémence Castel	Candice Pascal	40	20.00
6	2	8	Nâdiya	Christophe Licata	31	20.67
6	5	9	Joyce Jonathan	Julien Brugel	124	20.67
6	14	11	Sophie Davant	Nicolas Archambault	62	20.67
9	11	12	Lola Dubini	Joel Luzolo	22	22.00
10	1	4	Adriana Karembeu	Julien Brugel	157	23.26

Male

Ranking	Season	Place during the season	Stars	Partners	Total	Average (/40)
1	14	12	Nelson Monfort	Calisson Goasdoué	32	16.00
2	2	9	Cédric Pioline	Katrina Patchett	13	17.33
3	6	9	Thierry Samitier	Emmanuelle Berne	71	17.75
4	12	11	Théo Fernandez	Alizée Bois	19	19.00
5	9	9	Vincent Moscato	Candice Pascal	59	19.67
6	1	8	André Manoukian	Candice Pascal	15	20.00
7	10	7	Yoann Riou	Emmanuelle Berne	106	21.20
8	9	6	Jeanfi Janssens	Marie Denigot	128	21.33
9	8	10	Vincent Cerutti	Katrina Patchett	44	22.00
9	15	12	Philippe Lellouche	Katrina Patchett	44	22.00

Last places

Ranking	Season	Place during the season	Stars	Partners	Total	Average (/40)
1	12	12	David Douillet	Katrina Patchett	/^{1}	/
2	14	12	Nelson Monfort	Calisson Goasdoué	32	16.00
3	2	9	Cédric Pioline	Katrina Patchett	13	17.33
4	13	12	Caroline Margeridon	Christian Millette	36	18.00
5	1	8	André Manoukian	Candice Pascal	15	20.00
5	11	13	Lââm	Maxime Dereymez	20	20.00
7	8	10	Vincent Cerutti	Katrina Patchett	44	22.00
7	15	12	Philippe Lellouche	Katrina Patchett	44	22.00
9	6	10	Djibril Cissé	Silvia Notargiacomo	48	24.00
10	3	10	Christophe Dominici	Candice Pascal	49	24.50
10	7	11	Olivier Minne	Katrina Patchett	49	24.50
12	4	10	Noémie Lenoir	Christian Millette	50	25.00
12	10	10	Liane Foly	Christian Millette	50	25.00
14	9	11	Carla Ginola	Jordan Mouillerac	53	26.50
15	5	11	Elisa Tovati	Christian Millette	55	27.50

^{1}David Douillet didn't got a single note in season 12.

Worst Average by season

Ranking	Season	Place during the season	Stars	Partners	Total	Average (/40)
1	14	12	Nelson Monfort	Calisson Goasdoué	32	16.00
2	2	9	Cédric Pioline	Katrina Patchett	13	17.33
3	6	9	Thierry Samitier	Emmanuelle Berne	71	17.75
4	13	12	Caroline Margeridon	Christian Millette	36	18.00
5	12	11	Théo Fernandez	Alizée Bois	19	19.00^{1}
6	1	6	Marthe Mercadier	Grégoire Lyonnet	44	19.56
7	9	9	Vincent Moscato	Candice Pascal	59	19.67
8	11	13	Lââm	Maxime Dereymez	20	20.00
9	5	9	Joyce Jonathan	Julien Brugel	124	20.67
10	10	7	Yoann Riou	Emmanuelle Berne	106	21.20
11	8	10	Vincent Cerutti	Katrina Patchett	44	22.00
11	15	12	Philippe Lellouche	Katrina Patchett	44	22.00
13	7	8	Julien Lepers	Silvia Notargiacomo	159	23.56
14	3	8	Chimène Badi	Julien Brugel	142	23.67
15	4	10	Noémie Lenoir	Christian Millette	50	25.00

^{1}David Douillet didn't got a single note in season 12.

=== Highest and lowest score by dance ===
The best and worst performances in each dance according to the judges' marks are as follows (out of 40)

Dance	Best dancer	Best score	Worst dancer	Worst score
Waltz	Lénie	40	Fabienne Carat	19
Quickstep	Lenni-Kim	40	Baptiste Giabiconi; Jeanfi Janssens	16
Cha-Cha-Cha	Loïc Nottet; Priscilla Betti	39	Thierry Samitier	17.5
Jive	Rayane Bensetti	38.5	Marthe Mercadier	14.7
Rumba	Amel Bent; Samuel Bambi	40	Thierry Samitier	17
Tango	Loïc Nottet	38.5	Caroline Margeridon	16
Paso Doble	Agustín Galiana	40	Jeanfi Janssens	18
Foxtrot	Agustín Galiana	38.4	Marthe Mercadier; Vincent Cerutti	20
Samba	Samuel Bambi	40	Jeanfi Janssens	16
Viennese Waltz	M. Pokora; Sami El Gueddari	36	Sheila	21.3
Salsa	Adil Rami	38	Linda Hardy	21
Charleston	M. Pokora	36.7	Anouar Toubali	25
Freestyle	Tayc	40	Maghla	31
American Smooth	Adil Rami	39	Nelson Monfort	15
Contemporary	Loïc Nottet; Tatiana Silva; Samuel Bambi	40	Cœur de pirate	19
Bollywood	Lénie	38	Inès Reg	30
Flamenco	Alizée	35	Joyce Jonathan	19.5
Bolero	Miguel Ángel Muñoz	34.5	Laurent Ournac	24
Modern Jazz	Laury Thilleman	28.5	Florent Peyre	27
Disco	Lætitia Milot	33.5	Damien Sargue	27.5
Boogie-woogie	Tal	33	Tal	33
Jazz Broadway	Loic Nottet	40	Yoann Riou	19
Country	Tonya Kinzinger	34.5	Tonya Kinzinger	34.5
Ballet	Brian Joubert	29.5	Brian Joubert	29.5
Hip Hop	Corneille	31	Corneille	31
Afro-jazz	Sami El Gueddari	35	Nathalie Péchalat	31.5
Lindy Hop	Corneille	31.5	Yoann Riou	21
Argentine Tango	Sami El Gueddari; Keiona Revlon; Lénie	38	Clémence Castel	19
Mambo	Laurent Maistret	35	Priscilla Betti	34.5
Jazz	Juju Fitcats	38	Lucie Bernardoni	28

=== Highest and lowest note by dance ===
Dance	Best dancer	Best note	Worst dancer	Worst note
Waltz	Emmanuel Moire; Olivier Dion; Priscilla Betti; Camille Lou; Artus; Tatiana Silva; Lenni-Kim; Clément Rémiens; Inès Reg; Nico Capone; Adil Rami; Lénie; Samuel Bambi	10	Joyce Jonathan; Fabienne Carat; Vincent Moscato	3
Quickstep	Sofia Essaïdi; Brahim Zaibat; Tonya Kinzinger; Rayane Bensetti; Loïc Nottet; Priscilla Betti; Caroline Receveur; Laurent Maistret; Camille Lou; Lenni-Kim; Pamela Anderson; Terence Telle; Adil Rami	10	Baptiste Giabiconi; Gérard Vivès	3
Cha-cha-cha	Shy'm; Baptiste Giabiconi; Lorie; Amel Bent; Brahim Zaibat; Laetitia Milot; Rayane Bensetti; Nathalie Péchalat; Véronic DiCaire; Loïc Nottet; Priscilla Betti; Laurent Maistret; Tatiana Silva; Terence Telle; Iris Mittenaere; Tayc; Jungeli; Juju Fitcats	10	Thierry Samitier	2
Jive	M. Pokora; Amel Bent; Brahim Zaibat; Alizée; Rayane Bensetti; Nathalie Péchalat; Tonya Kinzinger; Loïc Nottet; Priscilla Betti; Véronic DiCaire; Laurent Maistret; Artus; Camille Lou; Lenni-Kim; Agustín Galiana; Clément Rémiens; Sami El Gueddari; Clara Morgane; Dita Von Teese; Lénie; Marcus	10	Marthe Mercadier	2
Rumba	Sofia Essaïdi; M. Pokora; Baptiste Giabiconi; Lorie; Taïg Khris; Emmanuel Moire; Amel Bent; Alizée; Brahim Zaibat; Louisy Joseph; Nathalie Péchalat; Miguel Ángel Muñoz; Corneille; Brian Joubert; Loïc Nottet; Priscilla Betti; Olivier Dion; Laurent Maistret; Artus; Lenni-Kim; Pamela Anderson; Terence Telle; Sami El Gueddari; Julie Zenatti; Lénie; Samuel Bambi; Juju Fitcats	10	Cédric Pioline; Philippe Candeloro; Thierry Samitier	3
Tango	Sofia Essaïdi; Philippe Candeloro; Amel Bent; Emmanuel Moire; Tonya Kinzinger; Nathalie Péchalat; Rayane Bensetti; Loïc Nottet; Olivier Dion; Billy Crawford; Jungeli; Juju Fitcats	10	Nelson Monfort	2
Paso Doble	M. Pokora; Shy'm; Estelle Lefébure; Taïg Khris; Laetitia Milot; Brahim Zaibat; Nathalie Péchalat; Loïc Nottet; Laurent Maistret; Camille Lou; Artus; Agustín Galiana; Joy Esther; Lenni-Kim; Bilal Hassani; Billy Crawford; Stéphane Legar; Carla Lazzari; Inès Reg; Adil Rami; Lénie; Juju Fitcats	10	Sheila; Bastian Baker; Jeanfi Janssens	3
Foxtrot	Sofia Essaïdi; M. Pokora; Shy'm; Amel Bent; Taïg Khris; Brahim Zaibat; Tonya Kinzinger; Olivier Dion; Artus; Camille Lou; Agustín Galiana; Stéphane Legar	10	Marthe Mercadier	3
Samba	Shy'm; Lorie; Brahim Zaibat; Tonya Kinzinger; Nathalie Péchalat; Caroline Receveur; Artus; Agustín Galiana; Bilal Hassani; Michou; Billy Crawford; Carla Lazzari; Inès Reg; Samuel Bambi	10	Fabienne Carat; Jeanfi Janssens	3
Viennese Waltz	M. Pokora	10	Sheila	3
Salsa	Nathalie Péchalat; Tatiana Silva; Adil Rami; Emma	10	Estelle Lefébure	3
Charleston	M. Pokora; Olivier Dion; Camille Lou	10	Brian Joubert; EnjoyPhoenix	4
Freestyle	Azize Diabaté; Tayc; Bilal Hassani; Billy Crawford; Stéphane Legar; Lénie; Florent Manaudou; Adil Rami; Samuel Bambi; Juju Fitcats	10	Maghla	7
American Smooth	Rayane Bensetti; Nathalie Péchalat; Véronic DiCaire; Ladji Doucouré; Bilal Hassani; Florent Manaudou; Adil Rami	10	Nelson Monfort	3
Contemporary	Alizée; Rayane Bensetti; Tonya Kinzinger; Corneille; Loïc Nottet; Priscilla Betti; Florent Mothe; Artus; Laurent Maistret; Lenni-Kim; Tatiana Silva; Azize Diabaté; Sami El Gueddari; Bilal Hassani; Tayc; Julie Zenatti; Juju Fitcats; Emma; Samuel Bambi	10	Cœur de pirate	3
Bollywood	Rayane Bensetti; Olivier Dion; Florent Mothe; Lénie	10	Hapsatou Sy; Ladji Doucouré; Inès Reg	6
Flamenco	Alizée; Karine Ferri; Iris Mittenaere	9	Joyce Jonathan	3
Bolero	Miguel Ángel Muñoz	10	Laurent Ournac	5
Modern Jazz	Laury Thilleman	8	Laury Thilleman; Florent Peyre	6
Disco	Damien Sargue; Laetitia Milot; Fabienne Carat	9	Damien Sargue	4
Boogie-woogie	Tal	9	Tal	7
Jazz Broadway	Loïc Nottet; Camille Lou; Agustín Galiana; Clément Rémiens; Emma	10	Keen'V	3
Country	Tonya Kinzinger	10	Tonya Kinzinger	7
Ballet	Brian Joubert	9	Brian Joubert	6
Hip Hop	Corneille	9	Corneille	7
Afro-jazz	Nathalie Péchalat; Sami El Gueddari	9	Nathalie Péchalat	7
Lindy Hop	Louisy Joseph; Corneille; EnjoyPhoenix	9	Yoann Riou	4
Argentine Tango	Brian Joubert; Florent Mothe; Camille Lou; Joy Esther; Pamela Anderson; Sami El Gueddari; Keiona Revlon; Adil Rami; Lénie	10	Sophie Vouzelaud; Camille Lacourt	3
Mambo	Laurent Maistret	10	Laurent Maistret	6
Jazz	Juju Fitcats	10	Karine Ferri; Lucie Bernardoni	6

=== Highest and lowest score of each contestant ===
The best and worst performances of each contestant according to the judges' marks are as follows (out of 40)

Season	Dancer	Best dance	Best score	Worst dance	Worst score
1	M. Pokora	Paso Doble; Foxtrot	38	Quickstep	30.7
1	Sofia Essaïdi	Rumba	39.3	Viennese Waltz	31.3
1	David Ginola	Jive; Samba	33.3	Tango	22
1	Adriana Karembeu	Rumba	30.7	Jive	18.7
1	Jean-Marie Bigard	Tango	28	Rumba; Paso Doble	20
1	Marthe Mercadier	Cha-Cha-Cha	24	Jive	14.7
1	Rossy De Palma	Cha-Cha-Cha	29.3	Tango	22.7
1	André Manoukian	Cha-Cha-Cha	20	Cha-Cha-Cha	20
2	Shy'm	Foxtrot	37.3	Quickstep	29.3
2	Philippe Candeloro	Paso Doble	34.7	Samba	21.3
2	Baptiste Giabiconi	Rumba	38	Quickstep	16
2	Sheila	Foxtrot	33.3	Quickstep; Tango	20
2	Francis Lalanne	Jive	34	Cha-Cha-Cha	22.7
2	Véronique Jannot	Rumba	26.7	Cha-Cha-Cha	20
2	Valérie Bègue	Waltz	30.7	Cha-Cha-Cha	21.3
2	Nâdiya	Rumba	22.7	Jive	18.7
2	Cédric Pioline	Rumba	17.3	Rumba	17.3
3	Emmanuel Moire	Tango	37.5	Jive	28.5
3	Amel Bent	Rumba	40	Samba	29.5
3	Taïg Khris	Paso Doble	35.5	Cha-Cha-Cha	22
3	Lorie	Rumba	37.5	Foxtrot; Viennese Waltz	29.5
3	Gérard Vivès	Tango	30.5	Quickstep	19
3	Estelle Lefébure	Paso Doble	34	Salsa	22
3	Bastian Baker	Rumba	31.5	Paso Doble	24.5
3	Chimène Badi	Rumba	27.5	Tango	20
3	Laura Flessel	Tango	29	Cha-Cha-Cha	23
3	Christophe Dominici	Tango	26	Foxtrot	23
4	Alizée	Rumba	39.5	Tango	28.5
4	Brahim Zaibat	Rumba	38	Bolero	27
4	Laetitia Milot	Foxtrot	35.5	Contemporary	27.5
4	Keen'V	Tango; Jive	30.5	Paso Doble	21
4	Laurent Ournac	Jive	30.5	Waltz	23
4	Tal	Boogie-woogie; Foxtrot; Contemporary	33	Contemporary	25
4	Laury Thilleman	American Smooth	32	Cha-Cha-Cha	28
4	Titoff	Bolero	31.5	Cha-Cha-Cha	23
4	Damien Sargue	Contemporary	33	Foxtrot	24
4	Noémie Lenoir	Tango	26	Rumba	24
5	Rayane Bensetti	Jive	38.5	Rumba; Waltz; Cha-Cha-Cha	29.5
5	Nathalie Péchalat	Samba	38.5	Afro Jazz	31.5
5	Brian Joubert	Argentine Tango; Rumba	36	Charleston; Samba	28.5
5	Miguel Ángel Muñoz	Rumba	35.5	Cha-Cha-Cha	22
5	Tonya Kinzinger	Foxtrot; Samba; Contemporary	37	Cha-Cha-Cha	22
5	Corneille	Rumba; Contemporary; American Smooth	33	Foxtrot	25
5	Anthony Kavanagh	Samba	32	Quickstep	26.5
5	Louisy Joseph	Rumba	33.5	Cha-Cha-Cha	27
5	Joyce Jonathan	Waltz	22	Flamenco	19.5
5	Ophélie Winter	Cha-Cha-Cha	27	American Smooth	23
5	Elisa Tovati	American Smooth	30	Tango	25
6	Loïc Nottet	Jazz Broadway; Contemporary	40	Cha-Cha-Cha	27.2
6	Priscilla Betti	Cha-Cha-Cha	39	Rumba	29.5
6	Olivier Dion	Bollywood	37.5	Jive	25.6
6	EnjoyPhoenix	Paso Doble	32	Cha-Cha-Cha	22
6	Fabienne Carat	Disco dancing	31	Waltz	19
6	Véronic DiCaire	Jive	37.6	Foxtrot	30
6	Vincent Niclo	Quickstep	31.5	Cha-Cha-Cha	26
6	Sophie Vouzelaud	Foxtrot	27	Argentine Tango	21.5
6	Thierry Samitier	Quickstep	19	Rumba	17
6	Djibril Cissé	Foxtrot	25	Samba	23
7	Laurent Maistret	Paso Doble	38.5	Samba	30
7	Camille Lou	Jazz Broadway	39	Samba	28
7	Artus	Paso Doble	37.5	Cha-Cha-Cha	26.4
7	Karine Ferri	Salsa; Waltz	34	Cha-Cha-Cha; Samba	25
7	Florent Mothe	Contemporary	37	Paso Doble	26.5
7	Caroline Receveur	Quickstep	36	Rumba	30
7	Valérie Damidot	Waltz	30	Samba	22.4
7	Julien Lepers	Waltz; Quickstep	26	Cha-Cha-Cha	20
7	Sylvie Tellier	Rumba; Argentine Tango	31	Cha-Cha-Cha	29
7	Kamel Le Magicien	Jive	30	Cha-Cha-Cha	21
7	Olivier Minne	Foxtrot	27	Cha-Cha-Cha	22
8	Agustín Galiana	Paso Doble	40	Contemporary	31
8	Lenni-Kim	Quickstep	40	Samba	31
8	Tatiana Silva	Contemporary	40	Samba	27
8	Elodie Gossuin	Foxtrot	34	Cha-Cha-Cha	20
8	Joy Esther	Quickstep	35.2	Cha-Cha-Cha	25
8	Camille Lacourt	Contemporary	28	Rumba	18
8	Sinclair	Quickstep	28.5	Samba	21
8	Arielle Dombasle	Tango	30	Paso Doble	24
8	Hapsatou Sy	Bollywood	30.5	Argentine Tango	26
8	Vincent Cerutti	Rumba	24	Foxtrot	20
9	Clément Rémiens	Jazz Broadway	39	Foxtrot; Rumba	26
9	Iris Mittenaere	Cha-Cha-Cha	37	Argentine Tango	25
9	Terence Telle	Quickstep	37	Paso Doble	27
9	Héloïse Martin	Tango	33.3	Salsa	27
9	Pamela Anderson	Argentine Tango	37	Cha-Cha-Cha	22
9	Jeanfi Janssens	Waltz; Contemporary; Charleston	26	Quickstep; Samba	16
9	Basile Boli	Quickstep	26	Samba	21
9	Lio	Foxtrot	33	Cha-Cha-Cha	29
9	Vincent Moscato	Waltz	21	Cha-Cha-Cha	18
9	Anouar Toubali	Charleston; Paso Doble	25	Charleston; Paso Doble	25
9	Carla Ginola	Cha-Cha-Cha	28	Argentine Tango	25
10	Sami El Gueddari	Contemporary	39	Samba	29.3
10	Ladji Doucouré	American Smooth	37	Samba	24
10	Elsa Esnoult	Cha-Cha-Cha; Waltz	29	Contemporary	22
10	Azize Diabaté	Contemporary	36	Foxtrot	23
10	Linda Hardy	Waltz; Quickstep	31	Salsa	21
10	Clara Morgane	Jive	33	Tango	30
10	Yoann Riou	American Smooth	26	Jazz Broadway; Rumba	19
10	Hugo Philip	Rumba	28	Cha-Cha-Cha	23
10	Moundir Zoughari	Paso Doble	26	Jazz Broadway	24
10	Liane Foly	Quickstep	27	Rumba	23
11	Tayc	Freestyle	40	Rumba	28
11	Bilal Hassani	Freestyle	39	Charleston	27
11	Michou	Samba; Freestyle	32	Foxtrot	21
11	Aurélie Pons	Paso Doble	32	Jive	21
11	Dita Von Teese	Rumba	35	Cha-Cha-Cha	30
11	Gérémy Crédeville	Contemporary	31.9	Quickstep	23
11	Lucie Lucas	Argentine Tango	29	Contemporary	22.9
11	Wejdene	Quickstep	28	Rumba	24
11	Vaimalama Chaves	Quickstep; Argentine Tango	26	Cha-Cha-Cha	21
11	Jean-Baptiste Maunier	Tango; Contemporary	28	Waltz	21
11	Moussa Niang	Paso Doble	25	Cha-Cha-Cha	22
11	Lola Dubini	Cha-Cha-Cha	22	Cha-Cha-Cha	22
11	Lââm	Quickstep	20	Quickstep	20
12	Billy Crawford	Paso Doble; Freestyle	39	Quickstep	32
12	Carla Lazzari	Paso Doble	39	Waltz; Contemporary	26.7
12	Stéphane Legar	Freestyle	38	Tango	25
12	Thomas Da Costa	Contemporary	31	Samba	20
12	Léa Elui	Contemporary	31	American Smooth	24
12	Florent Peyre	Argentine Tango	28	Rumba	22
12	Anggun	Tango	27	Cha-Cha-Cha	23
12	Amandine Petit	American Smooth	30	Contemporary	21.3
12	Eva Queen	Argentine Tango	28	Waltz; Contemporary	21
12	Clémence Castel	Waltz; Contemporary	21	Argentine Tango	19
12	Théo Fernandez	Quickstep	19	Quickstep	19
12	David Douillet	American Smooth	Red buzz	American Smooth	Red buzz
13	Natasha St-Pier	Argentine Tango	36	Jazz Broadway	24
13	Nico Capone	Contemporary	36	Rumba	27
13	Inès Reg	Samba	39	Contemporary; Bollywood	30
13	Keiona Revlon	Argentine Tango	38	Foxtrot	29
13	Roman Doduik	Jive; Argentine Tango	30	Samba	24
13	James Denton	American Smooth	26.7	Rumba; Contemporary	21
13	Black M	Quickstep	30	Waltz	22
13	Adeline Toniutti	Contemporary; Quickstep	29	Tango	25
13	Cristina Córdula	American Smooth	28	Samba	22
13	Diane Leyre	Samba	25	Rumba; Tango	23
13	Cœur de pirate	Rumba	21	Tango	17
13	Caroline Margeridon	Quickstep	20	Tango	16
14	Lénie	Waltz	40	Contemporary	33
14	Florent Manaudou	Freestyle	36	Salsa	25
14	Adil Rami	Paso Doble; American Smooth	39	Salsa	26
14	Jungeli	Samba; Cha-Cha-Cha	36	Rumba	30
14	Mayane	Salsa; Contemporary; Paso Doble	31	Cha-Cha-Cha	25
14	Julie Zenatti	Rumba; Contemporary	34	Cha-Cha-Cha	23
14	Claude Dartois	American Smooth; Quickstep; Waltz	32	Cha-Cha-Cha	28
14	Ève Gilles	Quickstep	35	Rumba	26
14	Frank Leboeuf	Quickstep	28	Waltz; Contemporary; Argentine Tango	26
14	Charlotte de Turckheim	Waltz	28	Cha-Cha-Cha	20
14	Sophie Davant	American Smooth	24	Cha-Cha-Cha	18
14	Nelson Monfort	Tango	17	American Smooth	15
15	Samuel Bambi	Samba; Rumba; Contemporary	40	Salsa	27
15	Juju Fitcats	Freestyle	39	Contemporary	31
15	Emma	Jazz Broadway; Salsa; Contemporary	36	Cha-Cha-Cha	29
15	Lucie Bernardoni	Tango	33.6	Jazz / Contemporary	28
15	Maghla	Contemporary	33	Samba	28
15	Marcus	Jive	37.3	Quickstep; Paso Doble	29
15	Julien Lieb	Argentine Tango	34	Samba	24
15	Laure Manaudou	Contemporary	28	Cha-Cha-Cha	23
15	Angélique Angarni-Filopon	Argentine Tango	30.4	Cha-Cha-Cha	27
15	Ian Ziering	Rumba	28	Cha-Cha-Cha	25
15	Stéphane Bern	Tango	24	American Smooth	23
15	Philippe Lellouche	Tango; American Smooth	22	Tango; American Smooth	22

=== Highest and lowest note of each contestant ===
The best and worst performances of each contestant according to the judges' marks are as follows (out of 10)

Season	Dancer	Best dance	Best note	Worst dance	Worst note
1	M. Pokora	Jive; Viennese Waltz; Charleston; Rumba; Paso Doble; Foxtrot	10	Quickstep; Foxtrot	7
1	Sofia Essaïdi	Foxtrot; Tango; Rumba; Quickstep	10	Viennese Waltz	5
1	David Ginola	Jive; Samba; Rumba	9	Tango; Rumba	4
1	Adriana Karembeu	Rumba; Samba	8	Jive; Tango	3
1	Jean-Marie Bigard	Waltz; Tango	7	Rumba	4
1	Marthe Mercadier	Foxtrot	8	Jive	2
1	Rossy De Palma	Cha-Cha-Cha	8	Tango	5
1	André Manoukian	Cha-Cha-Cha	6	Cha-Cha-Cha	4
2	Shy'm	Paso Doble; Cha-Cha-Cha; Samba; Foxtrot	10	Quickstep; Jive; Rumba; Viennese Waltz; Cha-Cha-Cha	7
2	Philippe Candeloro	Tango	10	Rumba	3
2	Baptiste Giabiconi	Cha-Cha-Cha; Rumba	10	Quickstep	3
2	Sheila	Samba; Foxtrot	9	Paso Doble; Viennese Waltz	3
2	Francis Lalanne	Jive	9	Cha-Cha-Cha; Foxtrot; Samba	5
2	Véronique Jannot	Jive; Rumba; Quickstep	7	Jive; Foxtrot	4
2	Valérie Bègue	Waltz; Tango	8	Cha-Cha-Cha; Tango	5
2	Nâdiya	Rumba	6	Jive	4
2	Cédric Pioline	Rumba	6	Rumba	3
3	Emmanuel Moire	Waltz; Rumba; Tango	10	Jive	4
3	Amel Bent	Jive; Tango; Foxtrot; Rumba; Cha-Cha-Cha	10	Samba; Jive	5
3	Taïg Khris	Paso Doble; Rumba; Foxtrot	10	Cha-Cha-Cha; Paso Doble; Quickstep	5
3	Lorie	Rumba; Cha-Cha-Cha; Samba	10	Foxtrot	5
3	Gérard Vivès	Waltz	9	Quickstep	3
3	Estelle Lefébure	Paso Doble	10	Salsa	3
3	Bastian Baker	Rumba; Paso Doble	9	Paso Doble	3
3	Chimène Badi	Rumba	8	Tango	3
3	Laura Flessel	Tango	8	Cha-Cha-Cha	5
3	Christophe Dominici	Tango	7	Foxtrot	5
4	Alizée	Contemporary; Rumba; Jive	10	Tango	5
4	Brahim Zaibat	Cha-Cha-Cha; Paso Doble; Jive; Foxtrot; Rumba; Quickstep; Samba	10	Bolero	5
4	Laetitia Milot	Cha-Cha-Cha; Paso Doble	10	Cha-Cha-Cha; Paso Doble; Jive	5
4	Keen'V	Jive	9	Jazz Broadway; Cha-Cha-Cha	3
4	Laurent Ournac	Foxtrot; Contemporary	9	Bolero; Waltz; Jive	4
4	Tal	Boogie-woogie; Rumba; Foxtrot; Contemporary	9	Cha-Cha-Cha	5
4	Laury Thilleman	Quickstep	9	Modern Jazz	6
4	Titoff	Bolero	9	Cha-Cha-Cha	4
4	Damien Sargue	Contemporary; Foxtrot; Disco dancing	9	Disco dancing	4
4	Noémie Lenoir	Tango; Rumba	7	Rumba	4
5	Rayane Bensetti	Bollywood; Contemporary; American Smooth; Jive; Quickstep; Cha-Cha-Cha; Tango	10	Rumba; Waltz; Cha-Cha-Cha	4
5	Nathalie Péchalat	Rumba; Tango; Paso Doble; Jive; American Smooth; Salsa; Cha-Cha-Cha; Samba	10	Cha-Cha-Cha; Afro Jazz	7
5	Brian Joubert	Argentine Tango; Rumba	10	Charleston; Samba	4
5	Miguel Ángel Muñoz	Bolero; Rumba	10	Cha-Cha-Cha; Waltz; Contemporary; Jive	6^{1}
5	Tonya Kinzinger	Foxtrot; Country; Quickstep; Tango; Samba; Contemporary; Jive	10	Cha-Cha-Cha; Paso Doble	5
5	Corneille	Rumba; Contemporary	10	Quickstep	4
5	Anthony Kavanagh	Samba; Jive	9	Quickstep; Jive	5
5	Louisy Joseph	Rumba	10	Samba; Tango	4
5	Joyce Jonathan	Waltz	7	Cha-Cha-Cha; Flamenco; Waltz	3
5	Ophélie Winter	Cha-Cha-Cha; Flamenco	7	American Smooth; Flamenco	5
5	Elisa Tovati	American Smooth	8	Tango; American Smooth	6
6	Loïc Nottet	Paso Doble; Jive; Contemporary; Quickstep; Rumba; Tango; Cha-Cha-Cha; Jazz Broadway	10	Foxtrot; Rumba	6^{2}
6	Priscilla Betti	Contemporary; Jive; Rumba; Waltz; Quickstep; Cha-Cha-Cha	10	Rumba	6
6	Olivier Dion	Waltz; Foxtrot; Rumba; Charleston; Tango; Bollywood	10	Paso Doble; Jive	5
6	EnjoyPhoenix	Paso Doble; Cha-Cha-Cha; Lindy Hop	9	Jive; Charleston; Foxtrot; Cha-Cha-Cha	4
6	Fabienne Carat	Disco dancing	9	Samba; Waltz	3
6	Véronic DiCaire	American Smooth; Jive; Cha-Cha-Cha	10	Rumba	6
6	Vincent Niclo	Quickstep	9	Cha-Cha-Cha; Jive	5
6	Sophie Vouzelaud	Foxtrot; Quickstep; Rumba; Argentine Tango	7	Argentine Tango	3
6	Thierry Samitier	Quickstep; Cha-Cha-Cha	6	Cha-Cha-Cha	2
6	Djibril Cissé	Foxtrot; Samba	7	Samba	4
7	Laurent Maistret	Jive; Paso Doble; Rumba; Mambo; Cha-Cha-Cha; Contemporary; Quickstep	10	Mambo	6
7	Camille Lou	Charleston; Tango; Jive; Jazz Broadway; Waltz; Paso Doble; Quickstep; Foxtrot	10	Samba	5
7	Artus	Foxtrot; Jive; Contemporary; Waltz; Samba; Rumba; Paso Doble	10	Paso Doble; Salsa	5
7	Karine Ferri	Rumba; Foxtrot; Flamenco; Cha-Cha-Cha; Salsa; Waltz	9	Samba	4
7	Florent Mothe	Tango; Contemporary; Bollywood	10	Rumba; Paso Doble	5
7	Caroline Receveur	Quickstep; Samba	10	Rumba; Contemporary	6
7	Valérie Damidot	Samba; Tango; Waltz; Cha-Cha-Cha	8	Samba; Cha-Cha-Cha	4
7	Julien Lepers	Waltz; Quickstep	8	Cha-Cha-Cha; Paso Doble	4
7	Sylvie Tellier	Cha-Cha-Cha; Rumba; Jive; Argentine Tango	8	Argentine Tango	6
7	Kamel Le Magicien	Jive	9	Cha-Cha-Cha	4
7	Olivier Minne	Foxtrot; Cha-Cha-Cha	7	Cha-Cha-Cha	4
8	Agustín Galiana	Foxtrot; Paso Doble; Jazz Broadway; Jive; Samba	10	Quickstep	6
8	Lenni-Kim	Jive; Rumba; Paso Doble; Contemporary; Waltz; Quickstep	10	Quickstep; Samba; Contemporary; Waltz; Tango; Rumba	7
8	Tatiana Silva	Salsa; Waltz; Cha-Cha-Cha; Contemporary	10	Samba; Rumba; Jive; Quickstep; Cha-Cha-Cha	6
8	Elodie Gossuin	Tango; Foxtrot	9	Tango; Quickstep	4
8	Joy Esther	Paso Doble; Tango	10	Cha-Cha-Cha	5
8	Camille Lacourt	Contemporary; Jive	9	Argentine Tango	3
8	Sinclair	Jive	9	Samba	4
8	Arielle Dombasle	Tango	9	Paso Doble; Foxtrot	5
8	Hapsatou Sy	Bollywood	9	Argentine Tango	5
8	Vincent Cerutti	Rumba; Foxtrot	6	Foxtrot	4
9	Clément Rémiens	Jive; Waltz; Jazz Broadway	10	Foxtrot; Rumba; Contemporary; Cha-Cha-Cha	6
9	Iris Mittenaere	Cha-Cha-Cha	10	Argentine Tango	5
9	Terence Telle	Cha-Cha-Cha; Rumba	10	Paso Doble	6
9	Héloïse Martin	Cha-Cha-Cha; Tango; Foxtrot	9	Salsa	5
9	Pamela Anderson	Argentine Tango; Rumba; Quickstep	10	Cha-Cha-Cha	4
9	Jeanfi Janssens	Waltz; Charleston	8	Samba; Paso Doble	3
9	Basile Boli	Foxtrot; Quickstep	8	Samba	4
9	Lio	Foxtrot; Samba; Quickstep	9	Cha-Cha-Cha; Quickstep	6
9	Vincent Moscato	Waltz	8	Waltz; Cha-Cha-Cha	3
9	Anouar Toubali	Charleston	8	Charleston; Paso Doble	5
9	Carla Ginola	Argentine Tango; Cha-Cha-Cha	7	Argentine Tango	6
10	Sami El Gueddari	Jive; Argentine Tango; Rumba; Contemporary	10	Quickstep; Rumba; Paso Doble; Cha-Cha-Cha; Samba	7
10	Ladji Doucouré	American Smooth	10	Foxtrot	4
10	Elsa Esnoult	Cha-Cha-Cha	9	Contemporary	4
10	Azize Diabaté	Contemporary; Freestyle	10	Foxtrot; Rumba	4
10	Linda Hardy	Rumba; Waltz; Quickstep	8	Salsa	4
10	Clara Morgane	Jive	10	Argentine Tango; Foxtrot; Contemporary; Tango; Jive	7
10	Yoann Riou	American Smooth	8	Jazz Broadway; Foxtrot; Lindy Hop; Rumba	4
10	Hugo Philip	Rumba	8	Argentine Tango; Cha-Cha-Cha; Jive	5
10	Moundir Zoughari	Paso Doble	8	Jazz Broadway; Samba; Paso Doble	5
10	Liane Foly	Quickstep	8	Rumba	4
11	Tayc	Cha-Cha-Cha; Contemporary; Freestyle	10	Rumba	6
11	Bilal Hassani	Contemporary; Paso Doble; Samba; American Smooth; Freestyle	10	Rumba; Cha-Cha-Cha	7^{3}
11	Michou	Samba	10	Foxtrot	4
11	Aurélie Pons	Contemporary; Argentine Tango	9	Rumba; Jive; Waltz; Cha-Cha-Cha	5
11	Dita Von Teese	Jive	10	Cha-Cha-Cha; Quickstep; Samba; Jive	7
11	Gérémy Crédeville	Argentine Tango; Rumba; Contemporary	8^{4}	Quickstep	5
11	Lucie Lucas	Argentine Tango	8	Salsa; Contemporary	5
11	Wejdene	American Smooth; Rumba	8	Rumba	5
11	Vaimalama Chaves	Rumba; Contemporary; Quickstep; Argentine Tango	7	Cha-Cha-Cha	4
11	Jean-Baptiste Maunier	Tango; Contemporary	8	Waltz	5
11	Moussa Niang	Paso Doble; Cha-Cha-Cha	7	Cha-Cha-Cha	4
11	Lola Dubini	Cha-Cha-Cha	7	Cha-Cha-Cha	4
11	Lââm	Quickstep	7	Quickstep	4
12	Billy Crawford	Samba; Tango; Paso Doble; Freestyle	10	Quickstep	7
12	Carla Lazzari	Samba; Paso Doble	10	Waltz; Contemporary	6
12	Stéphane Legar	Foxtrot; Paso Doble; Freestyle	10	Tango	4
12	Thomas Da Costa	Argentine Tango; Contemporary	8	Argentine Tango; Samba	4
12	Léa Elui	Tango; Contemporary; Cha-Cha-Cha; Paso Doble	8	Cha-Cha-Cha	5
12	Florent Peyre	Argentine Tango; Contemporary	8	Rumba; Contemporary	5
12	Anggun	American Smooth; Tango; Paso Doble; Quickstep	7	Cha-Cha-Cha; American Smooth	5
12	Amandine Petit	American Smooth	8	Samba; Contemporary	5
12	Eva Queen	Argentine Tango; Cha-Cha-Cha	7	Waltz; Contemporary; Cha-Cha-Cha	4
12	Clémence Castel	Waltz; Contemporary	6	Argentine Tango	4
12	Théo Fernandez	Quickstep	5	Quickstep	4
12	David Douillet	American Smooth	Red buzz	American Smooth	Red buzz
13	Natasha St-Pier	Argentine Tango; Quickstep; Waltz	9	Cha-Cha-Cha	5
13	Nico Capone	Waltz	10	Rumba; Paso Doble	6
13	Inès Reg	Waltz; Paso Doble; Samba	10	Bollywood	6
13	Keiona Revlon	Argentine Tango	10	Foxtrot; Quickstep; Jive; Contemporary; Samba	7
13	Roman Doduik	Quickstep; Jive; Contemporary; Argentine Tango; Cha-Cha-Cha	8	Quickstep; Waltz; Samba; Rumba	6
13	James Denton	Salsa; Waltz; Argentine Tango; American Smooth; Paso Doble	7	Rumba; Contemporary	4
13	Black M	Samba; Quickstep	8	Tango	4
13	Adeline Toniutti	Contemporary	9	Tango	5
13	Cristina Córdula	American Smooth; Tango	8	Samba	5
13	Diane Leyre	Samba	7	Rumba; Tango	5
13	Cœur de pirate	Contemporary; Rumba	6	Contemporary; Tango	3
13	Caroline Margeridon	Quickstep	6	Tango	3
14	Lénie	Argentine Tango; Jive; Bollywood; Paso Doble; Rumba; Freestyle; Waltz	10	Jive	7
14	Florent Manaudou	American Smooth; Freestyle	10	Salsa	5
14	Adil Rami	Argentine Tango; Waltz; Paso Doble; American Smooth; Salsa; Freestyle; Quickstep	10	Salsa	6
14	Jungeli	Tango; Cha-Cha-Cha	10	American Smooth; Tango; Rumba; Paso Doble	7
14	Mayane	Contemporary	9	Cha-Cha-Cha; Samba	5
14	Julie Zenatti	Rumba; Contemporary	10	Cha-Cha-Cha	5
14	Claude Dartois	Tango; American Smooth; Paso Doble; Rumba; Quickstep; Waltz; Cha-Cha-Cha	8	Cha-Cha-Cha	6
14	Ève Gilles	Tango; Quickstep	9	Rumba	6
14	Frank Leboeuf	Waltz; Contemporary; Argentine Tango; Quickstep; Paso Doble	7	Waltz; Contemporary; Argentine Tango; Paso Doble	6
14	Charlotte de Turckheim	Waltz	8	Cha-Cha-Cha	5
14	Sophie Davant	American Smooth	6	Cha-Cha-Cha	4
14	Nelson Monfort	Tango	5	Tango	2
15	Samuel Bambi	Waltz; Rumba; Freestyle; Samba; Contemporary	10	Salsa; Jive	6
15	Juju Fitcats	Tango; Cha-Cha-Cha; Jazz; Contemporary; Freestyle; Rumba; Paso Doble	10	Contemporary	7
15	Emma	Jazz Broadway; Salsa; Contemporary	10	Rumba; Paso Doble	6
15	Lucie Bernardoni	Tango; American Smooth; Rumba	9	Jazz/Contemporary	6
15	Maghla	Contemporary; Rumba; Foxtrot	9	Rumba	6
15	Marcus	Jive	10	Quickstep; Paso Doble; Argentine Tango	6
15	Julien Lieb	Argentine Tango	9	Samba	5
15	Laure Manaudou	Contemporary	8	Cha-Cha-Cha; American Smooth; Rumba	5
15	Angélique Angarni-Filopon	Samba; Argentine Tango; Salsa; Paso Doble	8	Cha-Cha-Cha	6
15	Ian Ziering	Samba; Salsa; Rumba; Cha-Cha-Cha	7	Cha-Cha-Cha	5
15	Stéphane Bern	Tango	7	American Smooth; Tango; Quickstep	5
15	Philippe Lellouche	Tango; American Smooth	6	Tango	4

^{1}Miguel got two 5 in his duet with Tonya Kinzinger but his worst note, if we actually talk about Miguel's performances, is 6.
^{2}Loïc got a 4 in his duet with EnjoyPhoenix but his worst note, if we actually talk about Loïc's performances, is 6.
^{3}Bilal got three 6 in his duet with Michou but his worst note, if we actually talk about Bilal's performances, is 7.
^{4}Gérémy got 8.9 from the public in his contemporary but talking about judge's notes, his best note is 8.

=== Notes of each contestants ===
Season	Couple	Total	10	9	8	7	6	5	4	3	2	1	Average
1	M. Pokora	39	12	13	12	2	—N/a						8.90
1	Sofia Essaïdi	39	10	15	11	2	—N/a	1	—N/a				8.77
1	David Ginola	39	—N/a	4	8	13	10	2	2	—N/a			6.90
1	Adriana Karembeu	27	—N/a		3	8	6	4	3	3	—N/a		5.81
1	Jean-Marie Bigard	15	—N/a			4	6	4	1	—N/a			5.87
1	Marthe Mercadier	9	—N/a		1	—N/a	3	1	2	1	1	—N/a	4.89
1	Rossy De Palma	6	—N/a		1	2	2	1	—N/a				6.50
1	André Manoukian	3	—N/a				1	1	1	—N/a			5.00
2	Shy'm	57	5	28	13	11	—N/a						8.47
2	Philippe Candeloro	57	1	7	19	10	8	9	2	1	—N/a		7.00
2	Baptiste Giabiconi	57	4	19	15	10	4	3	1	1	—N/a		7.84
2	Sheila	45	—N/a	4	7	14	7	5	6	2	—N/a		6.38
2	Francis Lalanne	33	—N/a	3	9	9	6	6	—N/a				6.91
2	Véronique Jannot	21	—N/a			8	8	3	2	—N/a			6.05
2	Valérie Bègue	9	—N/a		3	2	1	3	—N/a				6.56
2	Nâdiya	6	—N/a				2	3	1	—N/a			5.17
2	Cédric Pioline	3	—N/a				1	—N/a	1	1	—N/a		4.33
3	Emmanuel Moire	96	11	34	33	9	2	5	2	—N/a			8.21
3	Amel Bent	96	19	47	19	7	1	3	—N/a				8.70
3	Taïg Khris	96	5	19	30	26	9	7	—N/a				7.63
3	Lorie	80	6	33	25	12	3	1	—N/a				8.30
3	Gérard Vives	64	—N/a	1	12	16	19	9	6	1	—N/a		6.30
3	Estelle Lefébure	48	1	5	8	20	10	2	1	1	—N/a		7.00
3	Bastian Baker	32	—N/a	4	6	16	3	1	1	1	—N/a		7.06
3	Chimène Badi	24	—N/a		2	5	10	4	2	1	—N/a		5.92
3	Laura Flessel	16	—N/a		2	7	5	2	—N/a				6.56
3	Christophe Dominici	8	—N/a			2	5	1	—N/a				6.13
4	Alizée	100	13	46	33	4	3	1	—N/a				8.59
4	Brahim Zaibat	100	21	58	14	4	1	2	—N/a				8.88
4	Laëtitia Milot	100	2	16	48	24	7	3	—N/a				7.73
4	Keen'V	80	—N/a	1	20	38	12	5	2	2	—N/a		6.83
4	Laurent Ournac	64	—N/a	2	14	22	15	8	3	—N/a			6.66
4	Tal	48	—N/a	11	17	12	7	1	—N/a				7.63
4	Laury Thilleman	32	—N/a	1	17	13	1	—N/a					7.56
4	Titoff	24	—N/a	1	7	9	4	2	1	—N/a			6.92
4	Damien Sargue	16	—N/a	4	4	2	1	4	1	—N/a			7.00
4	Noémie Lenoir	8	—N/a			4	3	—N/a	1	—N/a			6.25
5	Rayane Bensetti	104	18	42	25	10	4	3	2	—N/a			8.41
5	Nathalie Péchalat	104	22	55	23	4	—N/a						8.91
5	Brian Joubert	104	4	38	41	16	4	—N/a	1	—N/a			8.17
5	Miguel Ángel Muñoz	84	4	24	28	18	8	2	—N/a				7.90
5	Tonya Kinzinger	68	10	36	10	7	2	3	—N/a				8.53
5	Corneille	52	1	7	17	20	3	3	1	—N/a			7.42
5	Louisy Joseph	40	1	3	17	14	3	—N/a	2	—N/a			7.43
5	Anthony Kavanagh	40	—N/a	5	11	19	3	2	—N/a				7.35
5	Joyce Jonathan	24	—N/a			1	12	4	4	3	—N/a		5.17
5	Ophélie Winter	16	—N/a			6	7	3	—N/a				6.19
5	Elisa Tovati	8	—N/a		3	1	4	—N/a					6.88
6	Loïc Nottet	88	43	31	9	1	3	—N/a	1	—N/a			9.20
6	Priscilla Betti	88	16	42	23	6	1	—N/a					8.75
6	Olivier Dion	88	9	29	27	17	2	4	—N/a				8.16
6	EnjoyPhoenix	72	—N/a	4	20	26	13	4	5	—N/a			6.89
6	Véronic DiCaire	58	4	20	27	6	1	—N/a					8.34
6	Fabienne Carat	58	—N/a	2	10	17	12	12	2	3	—N/a		6.31
6	Vincent Niclo	32	—N/a	1	14	10	4	3	—N/a				7.19
6	Sophie Vouzelaud	24	—N/a			12	5	3	3	1	—N/a		6.00
6	Thierry Samitier	16	—N/a				3	5	5	2	1	—N/a	4.44
6	Djibril Cissé	8	—N/a			3	3	1	1	—N/a			6.00
7	Laurent Maistret	97	20	57	14	5	1	—N/a					8.93
7	Camille Lou	97	23	43	20	9	1	1	—N/a				8.77
7	Artus	97	16	29	30	13	7	2	—N/a				8.29
7	Karine Ferri	81	—N/a	11	37	22	5	5	1	—N/a			7.51
7	Florent Mothe	67	4	26	17	13	5	2	—N/a				8.07
7	Caroline Receveur	51	2	17	19	11	2	—N/a					8.12
7	Valérie Damidot	35	—N/a		7	15	6	5	2	—N/a			6.57
7	Julien Lepers	27	—N/a		2	7	6	10	2	—N/a			5.89
7	Sylvie Tellier	21	—N/a		13	7	1	—N/a					7.57
7	Kamel Le Magicien	13	—N/a	1	2	3	5	1	1	—N/a			6.54
7	Olivier Minne	8	—N/a			4	2	1	1	—N/a			6.13
8	Agustín Galiana	89	21	43	17	7	1	—N/a					8.85
8	Lenni-Kim	89	29	38	14	8	—N/a						8.99
8	Tatiana Silva	89	12	24	31	15	7	—N/a					8.21
8	Élodie Gossuin	73	—N/a	4	18	20	12	16	3	—N/a			6.63
8	Joy Esther	59	4	15	21	13	5	1	—N/a				7.95
8	Camille Lacourt	43	—N/a	2	5	7	8	11	9	1	—N/a		5.79
8	Sinclair	35	—N/a	1	5	11	11	6	1	—N/a			6.46
8	Arielle Dombasle	22	—N/a	2	2	11	5	2	—N/a				6.86
8	Hapsatou Sy	16	—N/a	1	6	7	1	1	—N/a				7.31
8	Vincent Cerutti	8	—N/a				5	2	1	—N/a			5.50
9	Clément Rémiens	47	5	15	14	7	6	—N/a					8.13
9	Iris Mittenaere	47	2	15	15	10	4	1	—N/a				7.96
9	Terence Telle	43	3	12	16	11	1	—N/a					8.12
9	Héloïse Martin	39	—N/a	4	18	14	2	1	—N/a				7.56
9	Pamela Anderson	28	3	5	11	3	3	2	1	—N/a			7.71
9	Jeanfi Janssens	24	—N/a		2	3	6	5	6	2	—N/a		5.33
9	Basile Boli	20	—N/a		2	5	8	3	2	—N/a			6.10
9	Lio	16	—N/a	5	4	5	2	—N/a					7.75
9	Vincent Moscato	12	—N/a		1	—N/a	2	5	2	2	—N/a		4.92
9	Anouar Toubali	8	—N/a		1	2	3	2	—N/a				6.25
9	Carla Ginola	8	—N/a			5	3	—N/a					6.63
10	Sami El Gueddari	47	7	20	12	8	—N/a						8.55
10	Ladji Doucouré	43	1	12	15	6	7	1	1	—N/a			7.70
10	Elsa Esnoult	47	—N/a	1	7	17	15	6	1	—N/a			6.55
10	Azize Diabaté	35	2	7	8	11	4	1	2	—N/a			7.46
10	Linda Hardy	32	—N/a		7	13	8	3	1	—N/a			6.69
10	Clara Morgane	24	1	5	10	8	—N/a						7.96
10	Yoann Riou	20	—N/a		1	2	5	6	6	—N/a			5.30
10	Hugo Philip	16	—N/a		1	6	6	3	—N/a				6.31
10	Moundir	12	—N/a		1	5	2	4	—N/a				6.25
10	Liane Foly	8	—N/a		2	2	1	2	1	—N/a			6.25
11	Tayc	44	6	17	14	6	1	—N/a					8.48
11	Bilal Hassani	48	8	18	15	4	3	—N/a					8.50
11	Michou	44	1	2	10	15	11	4	1	—N/a			6.89
11	Aurélie Pons	44	—N/a	2	7	16	12	7	—N/a				6.66
11	Dita Von Teese	28	1	5	14	8	—N/a						7.96
11	Gérémy Crédeville	28	—N/a		6	9	11	2	—N/a				6.68
11	Lucie Lucas	20	—N/a		1	10	5	4	—N/a				6.40
11	Wejdene	20	—N/a		2	8	8	2	—N/a				6.50
11	Vaimalama Chaves	16	—N/a			6	5	4	1	—N/a			6.00
11	Jean-Baptiste Maunier	12	—N/a		1	3	5	3	—N/a				6.17
11	Moussa Niang	8	—N/a			2	4	1	1	—N/a			5.88
11	Lola Dubini	4	—N/a			1	1	1	1	—N/a			5.50
11	Lââm	4	—N/a			1	—N/a	1	2	—N/a			5.00
12	Billy Crawford	36	10	20	5	1	—N/a						9.08
12	Carla Lazzari	36	4	9	17	5	1	—N/a					8.28
12	Stéphane Legar	36	4	13	7	8	3	—N/a	1	—N/a			8.08
12	Thomas Da Costa	32	—N/a		4	10	9	7	2	—N/a			6.22
12	Léa Elui	28	—N/a		7	10	10	1	—N/a				6.82
12	Florent Peyre	24	—N/a		2	11	8	3	—N/a				6.50
12	Anggun	19	—N/a			6	11	2	—N/a				6.21
12	Amandine Petit	15	—N/a		2	5	5	3	—N/a				6.40
12	Eva Queen	12	—N/a			6	3	1	2	—N/a			6.08
12	Clémence Castel	8	—N/a				1	6	1	—N/a			5.00
12	Théo Fernandez	4	—N/a					3	1	—N/a			4.75
12	David Douillet	0	—N/a										N/A
13	Natasha St-Pier	35	—N/a	10	9	7	8	1	—N/a				7.54
13	Nico Capone	35	1	4	16	11	3	—N/a					7.69
13	Inès Reg	35	5	10	16	3	1	—N/a					8.43
13	Keiona	31	2	9	13	7	—N/a						8.19
13	Roman Doduik	31	—N/a		8	15	8	—N/a					7.00
13	James Denton	23	—N/a			11	8	3	1	—N/a			6.26
13	Black M	27	—N/a		3	9	10	4	1	—N/a			6.33
13	Adeline Toniutti	23	—N/a	1	4	11	6	1	—N/a				6.91
13	Cristina Córdula	20	—N/a		2	8	8	2	—N/a				6.50
13	Diane Leyre	16	—N/a			1	13	2	—N/a				5.94
13	Cœur de pirate	12	—N/a				3	5	2	2	—N/a		4.75
13	Caroline Margeridon	8	—N/a				1	3	3	1	—N/a		4.50
14	Lénie	44	18	20	5	1	—N/a						9.25
14	Florent Manaudou	48	2	16	19	8	2	1	—N/a				8.10
14	Adil Rami	48	15	14	8	9	2	—N/a					8.65
14	Jungeli	40	3	18	13	6	—N/a						8.45
14	Mayane	36	—N/a	1	8	20	5	2	—N/a				7.03
14	Julie Zenatti	32	1	1	17	8	4	1	—N/a				7.50
14	Claude Dartois	28	—N/a		19	8	1	—N/a					7.64
14	Ève Gilles	24	—N/a	4	11	7	2	—N/a					7.71
14	Franck Leboeuf	16	—N/a			11	5	—N/a					6.69
14	Charlotte de Turckheim	16	—N/a		1	6	5	4	—N/a				6.25
14	Sophie Davant	12	—N/a				4	6	2	—N/a			5.17
14	Nelson Monfort	8	—N/a					3	3	1	1	—N/a	4.00
15	Samuel & Ana	48	12	15	14	5	2	—N/a					8.63
15	Juju & Jordan	48	11	19	17	1	—N/a						8.83
15	Emma & Dorian	48	1	13	24	8	2	—N/a					8.06
15	Lucie & Christophe	36	—N/a	5	25	5	1	—N/a					7.94
15	Maghla & Adrien	32	—N/a	4	15	12	1	—N/a					7.69
15	Marcus & Marie	32	2	3	19	5	3	—N/a					7.88
15	Julien & Elsa	23	—N/a	2	5	9	6	1	—N/a				7.04
15	Laure & Christian	20	—N/a		1	8	8	3	—N/a				6.35
15	Angélique & Yann-Alrick	21	—N/a		9	11	1	—N/a					7.38
15	Ian & Denitsa	17	—N/a			12	4	1	—N/a				6.65
15	Stéphane & Calisson	13	—N/a			1	9	3	—N/a				5.85
15	Philippe & Katrina	8	—N/a				5	2	1	—N/a			5.50
Total		6030	504	1385	1561	1307	725	373	139	33	3	0	7.63

=== Perfect scores ===
No°	Season	Place during the season	Stars	Partners	Prime	Dance
2	6	1	Loïc Nottet	Denitsa Ikonomova	9	Jazz Broadway; Contemporary
1	3	2	Amel Bent	Christophe Licata	9	Rumba
1	8	1	Agustín Galiana	Candice Pascal	10	Paso Doble
1	8	2	Lenni-Kim	Marie Denigot	10	Quickstep
1	8	3	Tatiana Silva	Christophe Licata	10	Contemporary
1	11	1	Tayc	Fauve Hautot	11	Freestyle
1	14	1	Lénie	Jordan Mouillerac	11	Waltz
1	15	1	Samuel Bambi	Ana Riera	11	Samba + Rumba + Contemporary

=== Below average scores ===
No°	Season	Place during the season	Stars	Partners	Prime	Score (/40)	Dance
3	6	9	Thierry Samitier	Emmanuelle Berne	1; 2; 3	19; 17; 17.5	Quickstep; Rumba; Cha-Cha-Cha
3	9	6	Jeanfi Janssens	Marie Denigot	1; 2; 5	16; 18	Quickstep; Samba; Paso Doble
2	1	4	Adriana Karembeu	Julien Brugel	5	19.3; 18.7	Tango; Jive
2	10	7	Yoann Riou	Emmanuelle Berne	1; 4	19	Jazz Broadway; Rumba
2	13	11	Cœur de pirate	Nicolas Archambault	2; 4	19; 16	Contemporary; Tango
2	14	12	Nelson Monfort	Calisson Goasdoué	1; 3	15; 17	American Smooth; Tango
1	1	6	Marthe Mercadier	Grégoire Lyonnet	2	14.7	Jive
1	2	9	Cédric Pioline	Katrina Patchett	1	17.3	Rumba
1	2	3	Baptiste Giabiconi	Fauve Hautot	1	16	Quickstep
1	2	8	Nâdiya	Christophe Licata	2	18.7	Rumba
1	3	5	Gérard Vivès	Silvia Notargiacomo	6	19	Quickstep
1	5	9	Joyce Jonathan	Julien Brugel	3	19.5	Flamenco
1	6	5	Fabienne Carat	Julien Brugel	7	19	Waltz
1	8	6	Camille Lacourt	Hajiba Fahmy	2	18	Rumba
1	9	9	Vincent Moscato	Candice Pascal	3	18	Cha-Cha-Cha
1	12	11	Théo Fernandez	Alizée Bois	2	19	Quickstep
1	12	10	Clémence Castel	Candice Pascal	3	19	Argentine Tango
1	13	12	Caroline Margeridon	Christian Millette	2	16	Tango
1	14	11	Sophie Davant	Nicolas Archambault	1	18	Cha-Cha-Cha

=== First week scores above 30 ===
Score (/40)	Season	Place during the season	Stars	Partners	Dance
4 Buzz^{1}	11	2	Bilal Hassani	Jordan Mouillerac	Contemporary
4 Buzz^{1}	11	1	Tayc	Fauve Hautot	Samba
4 Buzz^{1}	11	5	Dita Von Teese	Christophe Licata	Argentine Tango
4 Buzz^{1}	12	1	Billy Crawford	Fauve Hautot	Cha-Cha-Cha
4 Buzz^{1}	12	2	Carla Lazzari	Pierre Mauduy	Contemporary
4 Buzz^{1}	12	3	Stéphane Legar	Calisson Goasdoué	Samba
35	4	1	Alizée	Grégoire Lyonnet	Cha-Cha-Cha
34	6	2	Priscilla Betti	Christophe Licata	Cha-Cha-Cha
33.3	1	2	Sofia Essaïdi	Maxime Dereymez	Quickstep
33	3	2	Amel Bent	Christophe Licata	Quickstep
33	3	4	Lorie	Christian Millette	Quickstep
33	4	9	Damien Sargue	Candice Pascal	Contemporary
33	5	5	Tonya Kinzinger	Maxime Dereymez	Rumba
33	7	6	Caroline Receveur	Maxime Dereymez	Tango
33	8	1	Agustín Galiana	Candice Pascal	Samba
33	8	2	Lenni-Kim	Marie Denigot	Quickstep
33	13	4	Keiona Revlon	Maxime Dereymez	Cha-Cha-Cha
33	14	1	Lénie	Jordan Mouillerac	Contemporary
32	4	3	Lætitia Milot	Christophe Licata	Quickstep
32	5	3	Brian Joubert	Katrina Patchett	Contemporary
32	5	2	Nathalie Péchalat	Grégoire Lyonnet / Christophe Licata	Contemporary
32	5	1	Rayane Bensetti	Denitsa Ikonomova	Jive
32	10	6	Clara Morgane	Maxime Dereymez	Argentine Tango
32	10	1	Sami El Gueddari	Fauve Hautot	Quickstep
32	14	8	Ève Gilles	Nino Mosa	Tango
32	14	4	Jungeli	Inès Vandamme	American Smooth
31	3	1	Emmanuel Moire	Fauve Hautot	Quickstep
31	4	2	Brahim Zaibat	Katrina Patchett	Tango
31	5	4	Miguel Ángel Muñoz	Fauve Hautot	Tango
31	6	1	Loïc Nottet	Denitsa Ikonomova	Foxtrot
31	7	2	Camille Lou	Grégoire Lyonnet	Rumba
31	7	5	Florent Mothe	Candice Pascal	Rumba
31	10	4	Azize Diabaté	Denitsa Ikonomova	Jive
31	15	2	Juju Fitcats	Jordan Mouillerac	Contemporary
31	15	4	Maghla	Adrien Caby	Argentine Tango
30.7	1	1	M. Pokora	Katrina Patchett	Quickstep
30	4	8	Titoff	Silvia Notargiacomo	Tango
30	6	5	Véronic DiCaire	Christian Millette	Foxtrot
30	7	1	Laurent Maistret	Denitsa Ikonomova	Samba
30	9	4	Héloise Martin	Christophe Licata	Cha-Cha-Cha
30	13	3	Inès Reg	Christophe Licata	Contemporary
30	14	7	Claude Dartois	Katrina Patchett	Tango
30	15	3	Emma	Dorian Rollin	Cha-Cha-Cha

^{1}In season 11 & 12, when couples got 4 Immunity buzz, the couples were directly qualified for next prime without receiving notes.

=== Celebrities by number of 10 ===
N°	Season	Place during the season	Stars	Partners	Dance style	Judge
43	6	1	Loïc Nottet	Denitsa Ikonomova	Paso Doble; Jive; Contemporary; Quickstep; Rumba; Tango; Cha-Cha-Cha; Jazz Broadway	Marie-Claude Pietragalla (X15); Fauve Hautot (X13); Jean-Marc Généreux (X8); Chris Marques (X7)
29	8	2	Lenni-Kim	Marie Denigot	Jive; Rumba; Paso Doble; Contemporary; Waltz; Quickstep	Fauve Hautot (X10); Nicolas Archambault (X8); Jean-Marc Généreux (X8); Chris Marques (X3)
23	7	2	Camille Lou	Grégoire Lyonnet	Charleston; Tango; Jive; Jazz Broadway; Waltz; Paso Doble; Quickstep; Foxtrot	Fauve Hautot (X10); Jean-Marc Généreux (X6); Marie-Claude Pietragalla (X5); Chris Marques (X1); Shy'm (X1)^{1}
22	5	2	Nathalie Péchalat	Grégoire Lyonnet / Christophe Licata	Rumba; Tango; Paso Doble; Jive; American Smooth; Salsa; Cha-Cha-Cha; Samba	M. Pokora (X11); Marie-Claude Pietragalla (X8); Jean-Marc Généreux (X2); Chris Marques (X1)
21	4	2	Brahim Zaibat	Katrina Patchett	Cha-Cha-Cha; Paso Doble; Jive; Foxtrot; Rumba; Quickstep; Samba	Marie-Claude Pietragalla (X9); Shy'm (X7); Jean-Marc Généreux (X5)
21	8	1	Agustín Galiana	Candice Pascal	Foxtrot; Paso Doble; Jazz Broadway; Jive; Samba	Nicolas Archambault (X6); Fauve Hautot (X6); Jean-Marc Généreux (X5); Chris Marques (X3); Telespectators (X1)
20	7	1	Laurent Maistret	Denitsa Ikonomova	Jive; Paso Doble; Rumba; Mambo; Cha-Cha-Cha; Contemporary; Quickstep	Marie-Claude Pietragalla (X8); Fauve Hautot (X7); Jean-Marc Généreux (X4); Shy'm (X1)^{1}
19	3	2	Amel Bent	Christophe Licata	Jive; Tango; Foxtrot; Rumba; Cha-Cha-Cha	Marie-Claude Pietragalla (X8); Jean-Marc Généreux (X5); Shy'm (X4); Chris Marques (X2)
18	5	1	Rayane Bensetti	Denitsa Ikonomova	Bollywood; Contemporary; American Smooth; Jive; Quickstep; Cha-Cha-Cha; Tango	Marie-Claude Pietragalla (X12); M. Pokora (X5); Jean-Marc Généreux (X1)
18	14	1	Lénie	Jordan Mouillerac	Argentine Tango; Jive; Bollywood; Paso Doble; Rumba; Freestyle; Waltz	Chris Marques (X2); Fauve Hautot (X6); Jean-Marc Généreux (X4); Mel Charlot (X6)
16	6	2	Priscilla Betti	Christophe Licata	Contemporary; Jive; Rumba; Waltz; Quickstep; Cha-Cha-Cha	Fauve Hautot (X7); Jean-Marc Généreux (X6); Marie-Claude Pietragalla (X2); Chris Marques (X1)
16	7	3	Artus	Marie Denigot	Foxtrot; Jive; Contemporary; Waltz; Rumba; Paso Doble	Marie-Claude Pietragalla (X7); Fauve Hautot (X5); Jean-Marc Généreux (X3); Chris Marques (X1)
15	14	3	Adil Rami	Ana Riera	Argentine Tango; Waltz; Paso Doble; American Smooth; Salsa; Freestyle	Chris Marques (X1); Fauve Hautot (X5); Jean-Marc Généreux (X3); Mel Charlot (X6)
13	4	1	Alizée	Grégoire Lyonnet	Contemporary; Rumba; Jive	Marie-Claude Pietragalla (X5); Jean-Marc Généreux (X4); Shy'm (X3); Chris Marques (X1)
12	1	1	M. Pokora	Katrina Patchett	Jive; Viennese Waltz; Charleston; Rumba; Paso Doble; Foxtrot	Jean-Marc Généreux (X6); Alessandra Martines (X5); Chris Marques (X1)
12	8	3	Tatiana Silva	Christophe Licata	Salsa; Waltz; Cha-Cha-Cha; Contemporary	Chris Marques (X3); Fauve Hautot (X3); Jean-Marc Généreux (X3); Nicolas Archambault (X3)
12	15	1	Samuel Bambi	Ana Riera	Waltz; Rumba; Freestyle; Samba; Contemporary	Chris Marques (X1); Fauve Hautot (X4); Jean-Marc Généreux (X2); Mel Charlot (X5)
11	3	1	Emmanuel Moire	Fauve Hautot	Waltz; Rumba; Tango	Marie-Claude Pietragalla (X4); Shy'm (X4); Jean-Marc Généreux (X2); Chris Marques (X1)
11	15	2	Juju Fitcats	Jordan Mouillerac	Tango; Cha-Cha-Cha; Jazz / Contemporary; Freestyle; Rumba; Paso Doble	Fauve Hautot (X5); Jean-Marc Généreux (X2); Mel Charlot (X4)
10	1	2	Sofia Essaïdi	Maxime Dereymez	Foxtrot; Tango; Rumba; Quickstep	Jean-Marc Généreux (X5); Alessandra Martines (X3); Chris Marques (X2)
10	5	5	Tonya Kinzinger	Maxime Dereymez	Foxtrot; Country; Quickstep; Tango; Samba; Contemporary; Jive	M. Pokora (X8); Marie-Claude Pietragalla (X2)
10	12	1	Billy Crawford	Fauve Hautot	Samba; Tango; Paso Doble; Freestyle	Bilal Hassani (X4); Marie-Agnès Gillot (X4); Chris Marques (X1); François Alu (X1)
9	6	3	Olivier Dion	Candice Pascal	Waltz; Foxtrot; Rumba; Charleston; Tango; Bollywood	Fauve Hautot (X5); Jean-Marc Généreux (X3); Marie-Claude Pietragalla (X1)
8	11	2	Bilal Hassani	Jordan Mouillerac	Contemporary; Paso Doble; Samba; American Smooth; Freestyle	Jean-Paul Gaultier (X5); Denitsa Ikonomova (X2); Chris Marques (X1)
7	10	1	Sami El Gueddari	Fauve Hautot	Jive; Argentine Tango; Rumba; Contemporary	Patrick Dupond (X3); Shy'm (X3); Jean-Marc Généreux (X1)
6	3	4	Lorie	Christian Millette	Rumba; Cha-Cha-Cha; Samba	Jean-Marc Généreux (X4); Marie-Claude Pietragalla (X1); Shy'm (X1)
6	11	1	Tayc	Fauve Hautot	Cha-Cha-Cha; Contemporary; Freestyle	Denitsa Ikonomova (X2); François Alu (X2); Chris Marques (X1); Jean-Paul Gaultier (X1)
5	2	1	Shy'm	Maxime Dereymez	Paso Doble; Cha-Cha-Cha; Samba; Foxtrot	Jean-Marc Généreux (X4); Chris Marques (X1)
5	3	3	Taïg Khris	Denitsa Ikonomova	Paso Doble; Rumba; Foxtrot	Marie-Claude Pietragalla (X3); Jean-Marc Généreux (X1); Shy'm (X1)
5	9	1	Clément Rémiens	Denitsa Ikonomova	Jive; Waltz; Jazz Broadway	Patrick Dupond (X3); Jean-Marc Généreux (X1); Shy'm (X1)
5	13	3	Inès Reg	Christophe Licata	Waltz; Paso Doble; Samba	Fauve Hautot (X2); Jean-Marc Généreux (X1); Mel Charlot (X1); Chris Marques (X1)
4	2	3	Baptiste Giabiconi	Fauve Hautot	Cha-Cha-Cha; Rumba	Alessandra Martines (X3); Jean-Marc Généreux (X1)
4	5	3	Brian Joubert	Katrina Patchett	Argentine Tango; Rumba	Marie-Claude Pietragalla (X2); M. Pokora (X2)
4	5	4	Miguel Ángel Muñoz	Fauve Hautot	Bolero; Rumba	M. Pokora (X3); Marie-Claude Pietragalla (X1)
4	6	5	Véronic DiCaire	Christian Millette	American Smooth; Jive; Cha-Cha-Cha	Fauve Hautot (X3); Jean-Marc Généreux (X1)
4	7	5	Florent Mothe	Candice Pascal	Argentine Tango; Contemporary; Bollywood	Fauve Hautot (X2); Marie-Claude Pietragalla (X2)
4	8	5	Joy Esther	Anthony Colette	Paso Doble; Argentine Tango	Nicolas Archambault (X2); Fauve Hautot (X1); Jean-Marc Généreux (X1)
4	12	2	Carla Lazarri	Pierre Mauduy	Samba; Paso Doble	Bilal Hassani (X2); François Alu (X1); Marie-Agnès Gillot (X1)
4	12	3	Stéphane Legar	Calisson Goasdoué	Foxtrot; Paso Doble; Freestyle	Bilal Hassani (X2); Marie-Agnès Gillot (X2)
3	9	3	Terence Telle	Fauve Hautot	Cha-Cha-Cha; Rumba; Quickstep	Patrick Dupond (X2); Shy'm (X1)
3	9	5	Pamela Anderson	Maxime Dereymez	Argentine Tango; Rumba; Quickstep	Patrick Dupond (X2); Shy'm (X1)
3	14	4	Jungeli	Inès Vandamme	Tango; Cha-Cha-Cha	Fauve Hautot (X1); Kamel Ouali (X1); Mel Charlot (X1)
2	4	3	Laëtitia Milot	Christophe Licata	Cha-Cha-Cha; Paso Doble	Jean-Marc Généreux (X2)
2	7	6	Caroline Receveur	Maxime Dereymez	Quickstep; Samba	Fauve Hautot (X2)
2	9	2	Iris Mittenaere	Anthony Colette	Cha-Cha-Cha	Jean-Marc Généreux (X1); Patrick Dupond (X1)
2	10	4	Azize Diabaté	Denitsa Ikonomova	Contemporary; Freestyle	Shy'm (X2)
2	13	4	Keiona Revlon	Maxime Dereymez	Argentine Tango	Fauve Hautot (X1); Mel Charlot (X1)
2	14	2	Florent Manaudou	Elsa Bois	American Smooth; Freestyle	Jean-Marc Généreux (X1); Mel Charlot (X1)
2	15	6	Marcus	Marie Denigot	Jive	Fauve Hautot (X1); Mel Charlot (X1)
1	2	2	Philippe Candeloro	Candice Pascal	Tango	Jean-Marc Généreux (X1)
1	3	6	Estelle Lefébure	Maxime Dereymez	Paso Doble	Jean-Marc Généreux (X1)
1	5	6	Corneille	Candice Pascal	Rumba; Contemporary^{2}	M. Pokora (X1)
1	5	7	Louisy Joseph	Guillaume Foucault	Rumba	M. Pokora (X1)
1	10	2	Ladji Doucouré	Inès Vandamme	American Smooth	Jean-Marc Généreux (X1)
1	10	6	Clara Morgane	Maxime Dereymez	Jive	Patrick Dupond (X1)
1	11	3	Michou	Elsa Bois	Samba	Jean-Paul Gaultier (X1)
1	11	5	Dita Von Teese	Christophe Licata	Jive	Jean-Paul Gaultier (X1)
1	13	2	Nico Capone	Inès Vandamme	Waltz	Mel Charlot (X1)
1	14	6	Julie Zenatti	Adrien Caby	Rumba; Contemporary	Kamel Ouali (X1)
1	15	3	Emma	Dorian Rollin	Jazz Broadway; Salsa; Contemporary	Jean-Marc Généreux (X1)

^{1}During 5th week, Marie-Claude Pietragalla was replaced by season 2 winner Shy'm as member of the jury.
^{2}Corneille got a 10 during a fusion dance (Rumba / Contemporary).

=== Professional partners by number of final ===
No°	Season	Place during the season	Professional	Stars
6	3; 4; 5; 6; 8; 13	2; 3; 2; 2; 3; 3	Christophe Licata	Amel Bent; Laetitia Milot; Nathalie Péchalat; Priscilla Betti; Tatiana Silva; Inès Reg
5	3; 5; 6; 7; 9	3; 1; 1; 1; 1	Denitsa Ikonomova	Taïg Khris; Rayane Bensetti; Loïc Nottet; Laurent Maistret; Clément Rémiens
5	2; 3; 10; 11; 12	3; 1; 1; 1; 1	Fauve Hautot	Baptiste Giabiconi; Emmanuel Moire; Sami El Gueddari; Tayc; Billy Crawford
3	2; 6; 8	2; 3; 1	Candice Pascal	Philippe Candeloro; Olivier Dion; Agustín Galiana
3	1; 4; 5	1; 2; 3	Katrina Patchett	M. Pokora; Brahim Zaibat; Brian Joubert
3	11; 14; 15	2; 1; 2	Jordan Mouillerac	Bilal Hassani; Lénie; Juju Fitcats
2	14; 15	3; 1	Ana Riera	Adil Rami; Samuel Bambi
2	9; 13	2; 1	Anthony Colette	Iris Mittenaere; Natasha St-Pier
2	11; 14	3; 2	Elsa Bois	Michou; Florent Manaudou
2	4; 7	1; 2	Grégoire Lyonnet	Alizée; Camille Lou
2	10; 13	2; 2	Inès Vandamme	Ladji Doucouré; Nico Capone
2	7; 8	3; 2	Marie Denigot	Artus; Lenni-Kim
2	1; 2	2; 1	Maxime Dereymez	Sofia Essaïdi; Shy'm
1	12	3	Calisson Goasdoué	Stéphane Legar
1	15	3	Dorian Rollin	Emma
1	12	2	Pierre Mauduy	Carla Lazzari
1	1	3	Silvia Notargiacomo	David Ginola
0	/	/	Adrien Caby	/
0	/	/	Alizée Bois	/
0	/	/	Christian Millette	/
0	/	/	Coralie Licata	/
0	/	/	Emmanuelle Berne	/
0	/	/	Grégory Guichard	/
0	/	/	Guillaume Foucault	/
0	/	/	Hajiba Fahmy	/
0	/	/	Joël Luzolo	/
0	/	/	Julien Brugel	/
0	/	/	Nicolas Archambault	/
0	/	/	Nino Mosa	/
0	/	/	Samuel Texier	/
0	/	/	Yann-Alrick Mortreuil	/

=== Professional partners by number of win ===
No°	Season	Professional	Stars
4	5; 6; 7; 9	Denitsa Ikonomova	Rayane Bensetti; Loïc Nottet; Laurent Maistret; Clément Rémiens
4	3; 10; 11; 12	Fauve Hautot	Emmanuel Moire; Sami El Gueddari; Tayc; Billy Crawford
1	15	Ana Riera	Samuel Bambi
1	13	Anthony Colette	Natasha St-Pier
1	8	Candice Pascal	Agustín Galiana
1	4	Grégoire Lyonnet	Alizée
1	14	Jordan Mouillerac	Lénie
1	1	Katrina Patchett	M. Pokora
1	2	Maxime Dereymez	Shy'm
0	/	Adrien Caby	/
0	/	Alizée Bois	/
0	/	Calisson Gaosdoué	/
0	/	Christian Millette	/
0	/	Christophe Licata	/
0	/	Coralie Licata	/
0	/	Dorian Rollin	/
0	/	Elsa Bois	/
0	/	Emmanuelle Berne	/
0	/	Grégory Guichard	/
0	/	Guillaume Foucault	/
0	/	Hajiba Fahmy	/
0	/	Inès Vandamme	/
0	/	Joël Luzolo	/
0	/	Julien Brugel	/
0	/	Marie Denigot	/
0	/	Nicolas Archambault	/
0	/	Nino Mosa	/
0	/	Pierre Mauduy	/
0	/	Samuel Texier	/
0	/	Silvia Notargiacomo	/
0	/	Yann-Alrick Mortreuil	/

=== Professional partners by number of last places ===
No°	Season	Stars	Professional
5	2; 7; 8; 12; 15	Cédric Pioline; Olivier Minne; Vincent Cerutti; David Douillet; Philippe Lellouche	Katrina Patchett
4	4; 5; 10; 13	Noémie Lenoir; Elisa Tovati; Liane Foly; Caroline Margeridon	Christian Millette
2	1; 3	André Manoukian; Christophe Dominici	Candice Pascal
1	14	Nelson Monfort	Calisson Gaosdoué
1	9	Carla Ginola	Jordan Mouillerac
1	11	Lââm	Maxime Dereymez
1	6	Djibril Cissé	Silvia Notargiacomo
0	/	/	Adrien Caby
0	/	/	Alizée Bois
0	/	/	Ana Riera
0	/	/	Anthony Colette
0	/	/	Christophe Licata
0	/	/	Coralie Licata
0	/	/	Denitsa Ikonomova
0	/	/	Dorian Rollin
0	/	/	Elsa Bois
0	/	/	Emmanuelle Berne
0	/	/	Fauve Hautot
0	/	/	Grégoire Lyonnet
0	/	/	Grégory Guichard
0	/	/	Guillaume Foucault
0	/	/	Hajiba Fahmy
0	/	/	Inès Vandamme
0	/	/	Joël Luzolo
0	/	/	Julien Brugel
0	/	/	Marie Denigot
0	/	/	Nicolas Archambault
0	/	/	Nino Mosa
0	/	/	Pierre Mauduy
0	/	/	Samuel Texier
0	/	/	Yann-Alrick Mortreuil

=== Highest and lowest score by professional partners ===
The best and worst performances for each professional partners according to the judges' marks are as follows (out of 40)

Dancer	Best partner	Best dance	Best score	Worst partner	Worst dance	Worst score
Fauve Hautot	Tayc	Freestyle	40	Baptiste Giabiconi	Quickstep	16
Katrina Patchett	M. Pokora; Brahim Zaibat	Paso Doble; Foxtrot; Rumba	38	Cédric Pioline	Rumba	17.3
Grégoire Lyonnet	Alizée	Rumba	39.5	Marthe Mercadier	Jive	14.7
Julien Brugel	Sheila	Foxtrot	33.3^{1}	Adriana Karembeu	Jive	18.7
Silvia Notargiacomo	Francis Lalanne	Jive	34^{2}	Gérard Vivès	Quickstep	19
Candice Pascal	Agustín Galiana	Paso Doble	40	Vincent Moscato	Cha-Cha-Cha	18
Maxime Dereymez	Sofia Essaïdi	Rumba	39.3	Lââm	Quickstep	20
Christophe Licata	Amel Bent; Tatiana Silva	Rumba; Contemporary	40	Nâdiya	Jive	18.7
Grégory Guichard	Valérie Bègue	Waltz	30.7	Valérie Bègue	Cha-Cha-Cha	21.3
Christian Millette	Lorie	Rumba	37.5	Caroline Margeridon	Tango	16
Denitsa Ikonomova	Loïc Nottet	Jazz Broadway; Contemporary	40	Sinclair	Samba	21
Yann-Alrick Mortreuil	Karine Ferri	Salsa; Waltz	34^{3}	Charlotte de Turckheim	Cha-Cha-Cha	20
Guillaume Foucault	Louisy Joseph	Rumba	33.5	Louisy Joseph	Cha-Cha-Cha	27
Emmanuelle Berne	Kamel Le Magicien	Jive	30^{4}	Thierry Samitier	Rumba	17
Marie Denigot	Lenni-Kim	Quickstep	40	Jeanfi Janssens	Quickstep; Samba	16
Hajiba Fahmy	Camille Lacourt	Contemporary	28	Camille Lacourt	Rumba	18
Anthony Colette	Iris Mittenaere	Cha-Cha-Cha	37	Amandine Petit	Contemporary	21.3
Jordan Mouillerac	Lénie	Waltz	40	Eva Queen	Waltz; Contemporary	21
Inès Vandamme	Ladji Doucouré	American Smooth	37	Jean-Baptiste Maunier	Waltz	21
Samuel Texier	Wejdene	Quickstep	28	Wejdene	Rumba	24
Coralie Licata	Moussa Niang	Paso Doble	25	Moussa Niang	Cha-Cha-Cha	22
Adrien Caby	Julie Zenatti	Rumba; Contemporary	34	Aurélie Pons	Jive	21
Elsa Bois	Florent Manaudou	Freestyle	36	Thomas Da Costa	Samba	20
Joël Luzolo	Lola Dubini	Cha-Cha-Cha	22	Lola Dubini	Cha-Cha-Cha	22
Alizée Bois	Théo Fernandez	Quickstep	19	Théo Fernandez	Quickstep	19
Pierre Mauduy	Carla Lazzari	Paso Doble	39	Carla Lazzari	Waltz; Contemporary	26.7
Calisson Goasdoué	Stéphane Legar	Freestyle	38	Nelson Monfort	American Smooth	15
Nicolas Archambault	Sophie Davant	American Smooth	24^{5}	Cœur de pirate	Tango	17
Ana Riera	Samuel Bambi	Samba; Rumba; Contemporary	40	Roman Doduik	Samba	24
Nino Mosa	Ève Gilles	Quickstep	35	Ève Gilles	Rumba	26
Dorian Rollin	Emma	Jazz Broadway; Salsa; Contemporary	36	Emma	Cha-Cha-Cha	29

^{1}Julien Brugel got 37.6 in season 6 during a duet dance with Priscilla Betti, Véronic DiCaire & Yann-Alrick Mortreuil but talking about dances with his own partners, his best score was 33.3 with his season 2 partner, Sheila.
^{2}Silvia Notargiacomo got 38.5 in season 6 during a trio dance with Loïc Nottet & Denitsa Ikonomova but talking about dances with her own partners, her best score was 34 with her season 2 partner, Francis Lalanne.
^{3}Yann-Alrick Mortreuil got 37.6 in season 6 during a duet dance with Priscilla Betti, Véronic DiCaire & Julien Brugel but talking about dances with his own partners, his best score was 34 with his season 7 partner, Karine Ferri.
^{4}Emmanuelle Berne got 37 in season 6 during a trio dance with Priscilla Betti & Christophe Licata but talking about dances with her own partners, her best score was 30 with her season 7 partner, Kamel Le Magicien.
^{5}Nicolas Archambault got 38 in season 8 during a trio dance with Lenni-Kim & Marie Denigot but talking about dances with his own partners, his best score is 24 with his season 14 partner, Sophie Davant.

=== Highest and lowest note by professional partners ===
The best and worst performances for each professional partners according to the judges' marks are as follows (out of 40)

Dancer	Best note	Best partner	Best dance	Judge	Worst note	Worst partner	Worst dance	Judge
Fauve Hautot	10	Baptiste Giabiconi; Emmanuel Moire; Miguel Ángel Muñoz; Rayane Bensetti^{1} Olivier Dion^{2} Laurent Maistret^{2} Terence Telle; Sami El Gueddari; Tayc; Billy Crawford	Argentine Tango; Bolero; Cha-Cha-Cha; Contemporary; Freestyle; Jive; Paso Doble; Quickstep; Rumba; Samba; Tango; Waltz	Alessandra Martines; Bilal Hassani; Chris Marques; Denitsa Ikonomova; François Alu; Jean-Marc Généreux; Jean-Paul Gaultier; Marie-Agnès Gillot; Marie-Claude Pietragalla; M. Pokora; Patrick Dupond; Shy'm	3	Baptiste Giabiconi; Keen'V	Cha-Cha-Cha; Jazz Broadway; Quickstep	Chris Marques
Katrina Patchett	10	M. Pokora; Brahim Zaibat; Brian Joubert; Pamela Anderson^{2}	Cha-Cha-Cha; Charleston; Foxtrot; Jive; Paso Doble; Quickstep; Rumba; Samba; Tango; Viennese Waltz	Alessandra Martines; Chris Marques; Jean-Marc Généreux; Marie-Claude Pietragalla; M. Pokora; Patrick Dupond; Shy'm	3	Cédric Pioline; Bastian Baker	Paso Doble; Rumba	Chris Marques
Grégoire Lyonnet	10	Lorie^{2} Alizée; Camille Lou	Charleston; Contemporary; Foxtrot; Jazz Broadway; Jive; Paso Doble; Quickstep; Rumba; Tango; Waltz	Chris Marques; Fauve Hautot; Jean-Marc Généreux; Marie-Claude Pietragalla; Shy'm	2	Marthe Mercadier	Jive	Chris Marques
Julien Brugel	10	Véronic DiCaire^{1}	Jive	Fauve Hautot; Jean-Marc Généreux	3	Adriana Karembeu; Sheila; Chimène Badi; Joyce Jonathan; Fabienne Carat	Cha-Cha-Cha; Flamenco; Paso Doble; Samba; Tango; Viennese Waltz	Chris Marques; Jean-Marc Généreux
Silvia Notargiacomo	10	Loïc Nottet^{2}	Tango	Chris Marques; Fauve Hautot; Marie-Claude Pietragalla	3	Gérard Vivès	Quickstep	Chris Marques
Candice Pascal	10	Philippe Candeloro; Alizée^{2} Corneille; Miguel Ángel Muñoz^{2} Loïc Nottet^{1} Olivier Dion; Florent Mothe; Agustín Galiana	Bollywood; Charleston; Contemporary; Foxtrot; Jazz Broadway; Jive; Paso Doble; Rumba; Samba; Tango	Chris Marques; Fauve Hautot; Jean-Marc Généreux; Marie-Claude Pietragalla; M. Pokora; Nicolas Archambault; Shy'm	3	Philippe Candeloro; Vincent Moscato	Cha-Cha-Cha; Rumba; Waltz	Chris Marques; Jean-Marc Généreux
Maxime Dereymez	10	Sofia Essaïdi; Shy'm; Estelle Lefébure; Tonya Kinzinger; Véronic DiCaire^{2} Caroline Receveur; Pamela Anderson; Clara Morgane; Keiona Revlon	Argentine Tango; Cha-Cha-Cha; Country; Contemporary; Foxtrot; Jive; Paso Doble; Quickstep; Rumba; Samba; Tango	Alessandra Martines; Chris Marques; Fauve Hautot; Jean-Marc Généreux; Marie-Claude Pietragalla; M. Pokora; Mel Charlot; Patrick Dupond; Shy'm	3	Estelle Lefébure; Sophie Vouzelaud	Argentine Tango; Salsa	Chris Marques
Christophe Licata	10	Amel Bent; Laëtitia Milot; Nathalie Péchalat; Priscilla Betti; Tatiana Silva; Dita Von Teese; Inès Reg	American Smooth; Cha-Cha-Cha; Contemporary; Foxtrot; Jive; Paso Doble; Quickstep; Rumba; Salsa; Samba; Tango; Waltz	Chris Marques; Fauve Hautot; Jean-Marc Généreux; Jean-Paul Gaultier; Marie-Claude Pietragalla; M. Pokora; Mel Charlot; Nicolas Archambault; Shy'm	4	Nâdiya; EnjoyPhoenix; Linda Hardy	Cha-Cha-Cha; Jive; Salsa	Alessandra Martines; Chris Marques
Grégory Guichard	8	Valérie Bègue	Tango; Waltz	Alessandra Martines; Chris Marques	5	Valérie Bègue	Cha-Cha-Cha; Tango	Alessandra Martines; Chris Marques
Christian Millette	10	Lorie; Nathalie Péchalat^{2} Véronic DiCaire	American Smooth; Cha-Cha-Cha; Jive; Rumba; Samba	Fauve Hautot; Jean-Marc Généreux; Marie-Claude Pietragalla; M. Pokora; Shy'm	3	Caroline Margeridon	Tango	Chris Marques
Denitsa Ikonomova	10	Taïg Khris; Rayane Bensetti; Loïc Nottet; Olivier Dion^{1} Laurent Maistret; Clément Rémiens; Azize Diabaté	American Smooth; Bollywood; Cha-Cha-Cha; Contemporary; Foxtrot; Freestyle; Jazz Broadway; Jive; Mambo; Paso Doble; Quickstep; Rumba; Tango; Waltz	Chris Marques; Fauve Hautot; Jean-Marc Généreux; Marie-Claude Pietragalla; M. Pokora; Patrick Dupond; Shy'm	4	Laurent Ournac; Rayane Bensetti; Sinclair; Azize Diabaté	Bolero; Cha-Cha-Cha; Foxtrot; Jive; Rumba; Samba; Waltz	Chris Marques; Jean-Marc Généreux
Yann-Alrick Mortreuil	10	Priscilla Betti^{1}	Jive	Fauve Hautot; Jean-Marc Généreux	4	EnjoyPhoenix; Karine Ferri	Cha-Cha-Cha; Charleston; Foxtrot; Jive; Samba	Chris Marques; Jean-Marc Généreux
Guillaume Foucault	10	Louisy Joseph; Tonya Kinzinger^{1}	Rumba; Tango	M. Pokora	4	Louisy Joseph	Tango	Chris Marques
Emmanuelle Berne	10	Priscilla Betti^{2}	Rumba	Fauve Hautot	2	Thierry Samitier	Cha-Cha-Cha	Jean-Marc Généreux
Marie Denigot	10	Artus; Lenni-Kim; Agustín Galiana^{1} Marcus	Contemporary; Foxtrot; Jive; Paso Doble; Quickstep; Rumba; Samba; Waltz	Chris Marques; Fauve Hautot; Jean-Marc Généreux; Marie-Claude Pietragalla; Mel Charlot; Nicolas Archambault; Telespectators	3	Jeanfi Janssens	Paso Doble; Samba	Chris Marques; Jean-Marc Généreux
Hajiba Fahmy	9	Camille Lacourt	Contemporary; Jive	Fauve Hautot	3	Camille Lacourt	Argentine Tango	Chris Marques
Anthony Colette	10	Joy Esther; Iris Mittenaere	Cha-Cha-Cha; Paso Doble; Tango	Fauve Hautot; Jean-Marc Généreux; Nicolas Archambault; Patrick Dupond	4	Elsa Esnoult	Contemporary	Chris Marques
Jordan Mouillerac	10	Bilal Hassani; Lénie; Juju Fitcats	American Smooth; Argentine Tango; Bollywood; Cha-Cha-Cha; Contemporary; Freestyle; Jazz; Jive; Paso Doble; Rumba; Samba; Tango; Waltz	Chris Marques; Denitsa Ikonomova; Fauve Hautot; Jean-Marc Généreux; Jean-Paul Gaultier; Mel Charlot	4	Eva Queen	Cha-Cha-Cha; Contemporary; Waltz	Chris Marques; François Alu
Inès Vandamme	10	Ladji Doucouré; Nico Capone; Jungeli; Juju Fitcats	American Smooth; Cha-Cha-Cha; Tango; Waltz	Fauve Hautot; Jean-Marc Généreux; Kamel Ouali; Mel Charlot	4	Ladji Doucouré	Foxtrot	Jean-Marc Généreux
Samuel Texier	8	Wejdene	American Smooth; Rumba	Jean-Paul Gaultier	5	Wejdene	Rumba	Chris Marques; François Alu
Coralie Licata	10	Brahim Zaibat^{2}	Rumba	Marie-Claude Pietragalla; Shy'm	4	Gérard Vivès^{2} Moussa Niang	Cha-Cha-Cha; Foxtrot	Chris Marques; Jean-Marc Généreux
Adrien Caby	10	Julie Zenatti	Rumba; Contemporary	Kamel Ouali	5	Aurélie Pons; Anggun; Adeline Toniutti; Julie Zenatti	American Smooth; Cha-Cha-Cha; Jive; Rumba; Tango; Waltz	Chris Marques; Denitsa Ikonomova; François Alu; Jean-Paul Gaultier; Mel Charlot
Elsa Bois	10	Michou; Florent Manaudou	Samba; American Smooth; Freestyle	Jean-Marc Généreux; Jean-Paul Gaultier; Mel Charlot	4	Michou; Thomas Da Costa; Black M	Argentine Tango; Foxtrot; Samba; Tango	Chris Marques; François Alu
Joël Luzolo	7	Lola Dubini	Cha-Cha-Cha	Jean-Paul Gaultier	4	Lola Dubini	Cha-Cha-Cha	Chris Marques
Alizée Bois	5	Théo Fernandez	Quickstep	Bilal Hassani; François Alu; Marie-Agnès Gillot	4	Théo Fernandez	Quickstep	Jean-Marc Généreux
Pierre Mauduy	10	Carla Lazzari	Paso Doble; Samba	Bilal Hassani; François Alu; Marie-Agnès Gillot	6	Carla Lazzari	Contemporary; Waltz	François Alu
Calisson Goasdoué	10	Stéphane Legar	Foxtrot; Freestyle; Paso Doble	Bilal Hassani; Marie-Agnès Gillot	2	Nelson Monfort	Tango	Chris Marques
Nicolas Archambault	10	Lenni-Kim^{2}	Contemporary	Chris Marques; Fauve Hautot; Jean-Marc Généreux	3	Cœur de pirate	Contemporary; Tango	Chris Marques
Ana Riera	10	Adil Rami; Samuel Bambi	American Smooth; Argentine Tango; Contemporary; Freestyle; Paso Doble; Quickstep; Rumba; Salsa; Samba; Waltz	Chris Marques; Fauve Hautot; Jean-Marc Généreux; Mel Charlot	6	Roman Doduik; Adil Rami; Samuel Bambi	Jive; Quickstep; Rumba; Salsa; Samba; Waltz	Chris Marques; Fauve Hautot; Jean-Marc Généreux; Mel Charlot
Nino Mosa	9	Ève Gilles	Tango; Quickstep	Fauve Hautot; Jean-Marc Généreux; Mel Charlot	6	Ève Gilles	Rumba	Chris Marques; Mel Charlot
Dorian Rollin	10	Emma	Jazz Broadway; Salsa; Contemporary	Jean-Marc Généreux	6	Emma	Paso Doble; Rumba	Chris Marques; Fauve Hautot

^{1}Partner only during switch week.
^{2}Partner only during a trio dance.

=== Professional partners by number of 10 ===
N°	Partners	Seasons	Stars	Dance style	Judge
90	Denitsa Ikonomova	3; 5; 6; 7; 9; 10	Taïg Khris (x5); Rayane Bensetti (x15); Loïc Nottet (x42); Olivier Dion (x1); Laurent Maistret (x20); Clément Rémiens (x5); Azize Diabaté (x2)	American Smooth; Bollywood; Cha-Cha-Cha; Contemporary; Foxtrot; Freestyle; Jazz Broadway; Jive; Mambo; Paso Doble; Quickstep; Rumba; Tango; Waltz	Chris Marques; Fauve Hautot; Jean-Marc Généreux; Marie-Claude Pietragalla; M. Pokora; Patrick Dupond; Shy'm
75	Christophe Licata	3; 4; 5; 6; 8; 11; 13	Amel Bent (x19); Laëtitia Milot (x2); Nathalie Péchalat (x22); Priscilla Betti (x14); Tatiana Silva (x12); Dita Von Teese (x1); Inès Reg (X5)	American Smooth; Cha-Cha-Cha; Contemporary; Foxtrot; Jive; Paso Doble; Quickstep; Rumba; Salsa; Samba; Tango; Waltz	Chris Marques; Fauve Hautot; Jean-Marc Généreux; Jean-Paul Gaultier; Marie-Claude Pietragalla; M. Pokora; Mel Charlot; Nicolas Archambault; Shy'm
51	Fauve Hautot	2; 3; 5; 6; 7; 9; 10; 11; 12	Baptiste Giabiconi (x4); Emmanuel Moire (x11); Miguel Ángel Muñoz (x4); Rayane Bensetti (x3); Olivier Dion (x1); Laurent Maistret (x2); Terence Telle (x3); Sami El Gueddari (x7); Tayc (x6); Billy Crawford (X10)	Argentine Tango; Bolero; Cha-Cha-Cha; Contemporary; Freestyle; Jive; Paso Doble; Quickstep; Rumba; Samba; Tango; Waltz	Alessandra Martines; Bilal Hassani; Chris Marques; Denitsa Ikonomova; François Alu; Jean-Marc Généreux; Jean-Paul Gaultier; Marie-Agnès Gillot; Marie-Claude Pietragalla; M. Pokora; Patrick Dupond; Shy'm
50	Marie Denigot	7; 8; 15	Artus (x16); Lenni-Kim (x29); Agustín Galiana (x3); Marcus (x2)	Contemporary; Foxtrot; Jive; Paso Doble; Quickstep; Rumba; Samba; Waltz	Chris Marques; Fauve Hautot; Jean-Marc Généreux; Marie-Claude Pietragalla; Mel Charlot; Nicolas Archambault; Telespectators
38	Katrina Patchett	1; 4; 5; 9	M. Pokora (x12); Brahim Zaibat (x21); Brian Joubert (x4); Pamela Anderson (X1)	Cha-Cha-Cha; Charleston; Foxtrot; Jive; Paso Doble; Quickstep; Rumba; Samba; Tango; Viennese Waltz	Alessandra Martines; Chris Marques; Jean-Marc Généreux; Marie-Claude Pietragalla; M. Pokora; Patrick Dupond; Shy'm
37	Candice Pascal	2; 4; 5; 6; 7; 8	Philippe Candeloro (x1); Alizée (x3); Corneille (x1); Miguel Ángel Muñoz (x1); Loïc Nottet (x1); Olivier Dion (x8); Florent Mothe (x4); Agustín Galiana (x18)	Bollywood; Charleston; Contemporary; Foxtrot; Jazz Broadway; Jive; Paso Doble; Rumba; Samba; Tango	Chris Marques; Fauve Hautot; Jean-Marc Généreux; Marie-Claude Pietragalla; M. Pokora; Nicolas Archambault; Shy'm
37	Grégoire Lyonnet	3; 4; 7	Lorie (x1); Alizée (x13); Camille Lou (x23)	Charleston; Contemporary; Foxtrot; Jazz Broadway; Jive; Paso Doble; Quickstep; Rumba; Tango; Waltz	Chris Marques; Fauve Hautot; Jean-Marc Généreux; Marie-Claude Pietragalla; Shy'm
37	Jordan Mouillerac	11; 14; 15	Bilal Hassani (x8); Lénie (x18); Juju Fitcats (x11)	American Smooth; Argentine Tango; Bollywood; Cha-Cha-Cha; Contemporary; Freestyle; Jazz; Jive; Paso Doble; Rumba; Samba; Tango; Waltz	Chris Marques; Denitsa Ikonomova; Fauve Hautot; Jean-Marc Généreux; Jean-Paul Gaultier; Mel Charlot
34	Maxime Dereymez	1; 2; 3; 5; 6; 7; 9; 10; 13	Sofia Essaïdi (x10); Shy'm (x5); Estelle Lefébure (x1); Tonya Kinzinger (x9); Véronic DiCaire (x1); Caroline Receveur (x2); Pamela Anderson (x3); Clara Morgane (x1); Keiona Revlon (x2)	Argentine Tango; Cha-Cha-Cha; Country; Contemporary; Foxtrot; Jive; Paso Doble; Quickstep; Rumba; Samba; Tango	Alessandra Martines; Chris Marques; Fauve Hautot; Jean-Marc Généreux; Marie-Claude Pietragalla; Mel Charlot; M. Pokora; Patrick Dupond; Shy'm
27	Ana Riera	14; 15	Adil Rami (x15); Samuel Bambi (X12)	American Smooth; Argentine Tango; Contemporary; Freestyle; Paso Doble; Quickstep; Rumba; Salsa; Samba; Waltz	Chris Marques; Fauve Hautot; Jean-Marc Généreux; Mel Charlot
9	Christian Millette	3; 5; 6	Lorie (x6); Nathalie Péchalat (x1); Véronic DiCaire (x2)	American Smooth; Cha-Cha-Cha; Jive; Rumba; Samba	Fauve Hautot; Jean-Marc Généreux; Marie-Claude Pietragalla; M. Pokora; Shy'm
6	Anthony Colette	8; 9	Joy Esther (x4); Iris Mittenaere (x2)	Cha-Cha-Cha; Paso Doble; Tango	Fauve Hautot; Jean-Marc Généreux; Nicolas Archambault; Patrick Dupond
5	Inès Vandamme	10; 13; 14	Ladji Doucouré (x1); Nico Capone (X1); Jungeli (X3)	American Smooth; Cha-Cha-Cha; Tango; Waltz	Fauve Hautot; Jean-Marc Généreux; Kamel Ouali; Mel Charlot
5	Silvia Notargiacomo	6	Loïc Nottet (x5)	Tango	Chris Marques; Fauve Hautot; Marie-Claude Pietragalla
4	Calisson Goasdoué	12	Stéphane Legar (x4)	Foxtrot; Freestyle; Paso Doble	Bilal Hassani; Marie-Agnès Gillot
4	Coralie Licata	4	Brahim Zaibat (x4)	Rumba	Marie-Claude Pietragalla; Shy'm
4	Pierre Mauduy	12	Carla Lazzari (x4)	Paso Doble; Samba	Bilal Hassani; François Alu; Marie-Agnès Gillot
3	Elsa Bois	11; 14	Michou (x1); Florent Manaudou (X2)	American Smooth; Freestyle; Samba	Jean-Marc Généreux; Jean-Paul Gaultier; Mel Charlot
3	Nicolas Archambault	8	Lenni-Kim (x3)	Contemporary	Chris Marques; Fauve Hautot; Jean-Marc Généreux
2	Emmanuelle Berne	6	Priscilla Betti (x2)	Rumba	Fauve Hautot
2	Guillaume Foucault	5	Louisy Joseph (x1); Tonya Kinzinger (x1)	Rumba; Tango	M. Pokora
2	Julien Brugel	6	Véronic DiCaire (x2)	Jive	Fauve Hautot; Jean-Marc Généreux
2	Yann-Alrick Mortreuil	6	Priscilla Betti (x2)	Jive	Fauve Hautot; Jean-Marc Généreux
1	Adrien Caby	14	Julie Zenatti (x1)	Waltz; Contemporary	Kamel Ouali
1	Dorian Rollin	15	Emma (X1)	Jazz Broadway; Salsa; Contemporary	Jean-Marc Généreux
0	Alizée Bois	/	/	/	/
0	Grégory Guichard	/	/	/	/
0	Hajiba Fahmy	/	/	/	/
0	Joël Luzolo	/	/	/	/
0	Nino Mosa	/	/	/	/
0	Samuel Texier	/	/	/	/

=== Best and Worst partners by professional partners (according to rankings) ===
Dancer	Best partner	Best ranking	Worst partner	Worst ranking
Fauve Hautot	Emmanuel Moire; Sami El Gueddari; Tayc; Billy Crawford	1st	Jean-Marie Bigard	5th
Katrina Patchett	M. Pokora	1st	Cédric Pioline; Olivier Minne; Vincent Cerutti; David Douillet; Philippe Lellouche	Last
Grégoire Lyonnet	Alizée	1st	Laura Flessel	9th
Julien Brugel	Adriana Karembeu; Sheila	4th	Joyce Jonathan	9th
Silvia Notargiacomo	David Ginola	3rd	Djibril Cissé	Last
Candice Pascal	Agustín Galiana	1st	André Manoukian; Christophe Dominici	Last
Maxime Dereymez	Shy'm	1st	Lââm	Last
Christophe Licata	Amel Bent; Nathalie Péchalat; Priscilla Betti	2nd	Ophélie Winter	10th
Grégory Guichard	Valérie Bègue	7th	Valérie Bègue	7th
Christian Millette	Lorie; Elodie Gossuin	4th	Noémie Lenoir; Elisa Tovati; Liane Foly; Caroline Margeridon	Last
Denitsa Ikonomova	Rayane Bensetti; Loïc Nottet; Laurent Maistret; Clément Rémiens	1st	Ian Ziering	10th
Yann-Alrick Mortreuil	EnjoyPhoenix; Karine Ferri	4th	Diane Leyre; Charlotte de Turckheim	10th
Guillaume Foucault	Louisy Joseph	7th	Louisy Joseph	7th
Emmanuelle Berne	Yoann Riou	7th	Kamel Le Magicien; Anouar Toubali	10th
Marie Denigot	Lenni-Kim	2nd	Jeanfi Janssens; Marcus	6th
Hajiba Fahmy	Camille Lacourt	6th	Camille Lacourt	6th
Anthony Colette	Natasha St-Pier	1st	Amandine Petit	8th
Jordan Mouillerac	Lénie	1st	Carla Ginola	Last
Inès Vandamme	Ladji Doucouré; Nico Capone	2nd	Jean-Baptiste Maunier	10th
Samuel Texier	Wejdene	8th	Wejdene	8th
Coralie Licata	Moussa Niang	11th	Moussa Niang	11th
Adrien Caby	Aurélie Pons; Maghla	4th	Adeline Toniutti	8th
Elsa Bois	Florent Manaudou	2nd	Black M Julien Lieb	7th
Joël Luzolo	Lola Dubini	12th	Lola Dubini	12th
Alizée Bois	Théo Fernandez	11th	Théo Fernandez	11th
Pierre Mauduy	Carla Lazzari	2nd	Carla Lazzari	2nd
Calisson Goasdoué	Stéphane Legar	3rd	Nelson Monfort	Last
Nicolas Archambault	Cœur de pirate Sophie Davant	11th	Cœur de pirate Sophie Davant	11th
Ana Riera	Samuel Bambi	1st	Roman Doduik	5th
Nino Mosa	Ève Gilles	8th	Ève Gilles	8th
Dorian Rollin	Emma	3rd	Emma	3rd

=== Best and Worst partners by professional partners (according to average) ===
Dancer	Best partner	Best average	Worst partner	Worst average
Fauve Hautot	Billy Crawford	36.33	Jean-Marie Bigard	23.47
Katrina Patchett	M. Pokora	35.59	Cédric Pioline	17.33^{1}
Grégoire Lyonnet	Camille Lou	35.09^{2}	Marthe Mercadier	19.56
Julien Brugel	Sheila	25.51	Joyce Jonathan	20.67
Silvia Notargiacomo	Anthony Kavanagh	29.40	Julien Lepers	23.56
Candice Pascal	Agustín Galiana	35.42	Vincent Moscato	19.67
Maxime Dereymez	Sofia Essaïdi	35.08	Lââm	20.00
Christophe Licata	Priscilla Betti	35.00^{2}	Nâdiya	20.67
Grégory Guichard	Valérie Bègue	26.22	Valérie Bègue	26.22
Christian Millette	Véronic DiCaire	33.38	Caroline Margeridon	18.00
Denitsa Ikonomova	Loïc Nottet	36.82	Sinclair	25.83
Yann-Alrick Mortreuil	Tal	30.50	Diane Leyre	23.75
Guillaume Foucault	Louisy Joseph	29.70	Louisy Joseph	29.70
Emmanuelle Berne	Kamel Le Magicien	26.15	Thierry Samitier	17.75
Marie Denigot	Lenni-Kim	35.96	Jeanfi Janssens	21.33
Hajiba Fahmy	Camille Lacourt	23.16	Camille Lacourt	23.16
Anthony Colette	Iris Mittenaere	31.83	Amandine Petit	25.60
Jordan Mouillerac	Lénie	37.00	Eva Queen	24.33
Inès Vandamme	Jungeli	33.80	Jean-Baptiste Maunier	24.67
Samuel Texier	Wejdene	26.00	Wejdene	26.00
Coralie Licata	Moussa Niang	23.50	Moussa Niang	23.50
Adrien Caby	Maghla	30.75	Anggun	24.84
Elsa Bois	Florent Manaudou	32.42	Thomas Da Costa	24.88
Joël Luzolo	Lola Dubini	22.00	Lola Dubini	22.00
Alizée Bois	Théo Fernandez	19.00	Théo Fernandez	19.00
Pierre Mauduy	Carla Lazzari	33.11	Carla Lazzari	33.11
Calisson Goasdoué	Stéphane Legar	32.33	Nelson Monfort	16.00
Nicolas Archambault	Sophie Davant	20.67	Cœur de pirate	19.00
Ana Riera	Adil Rami	34.58	Roman Doduik	28.00
Nino Mosa	Ève Gilles	30.83	Ève Gilles	30.83
Dorian Rollin	Emma	32.25	Emma	32.25

^{1}David Douillet didn't got a single note.
^{2}Nathalie Péchalat got 35.65 but, as she was with both Grégoire Lyonnet & Christophe Licata, she's not really counted as Grégoire's or Christophe's partner.

=== Best routines ===
The best routines according to the judges' marks are as follows (out of 40)

Ranking	Season	Week	Celebrity	Professional partner	Style	Music	Note	Note (/40)
1	3	9 (final)	Amel Bent	Christophe Licata	Rumba	Ma révérence - Véronique Sanson	80/80	40
1	6	10 (final)	Loïc Nottet	Denitsa Ikonomova	Jazz Broadway	Don't Rain on My Parade - Lea Michele	80/80	40
1	6	10 (final)	Loïc Nottet	Denitsa Ikonomova	Contemporary	Chandelier - Sia	80/80	40
1	8	10 (final)	Agustín Galiana	Candice Pascal	Paso doble	Ameksa - Taalbi Brothers	80/80	40
1	8	10 (final)	Lenni-Kim	Marie Denigot	Quickstep	Another Day of Sun from La La Land	80/80	40
1	8	10 (final)	Tatiana Silva	Christophe Licata	Contemporary	What About Us - Pink	80/80	40
1	11	11 (final)	Tayc	Fauve Hautot	Freestyle	Shallow - Ndlovu Youth Choir	40/40	40
1	14	11 (final)	Lénie	Jordan Mouillerac	Waltz	Don't Speak - Scott Bradlee's Postmodern Jukebox & Haley Reinhart	40/40	40
1	15	11 (final)	Samuel Bambi	Ana Riera	Samba + Rumba + Contemporary	I Want You Back - The Jackson 5 + Risk It All - Bruno Mars + Formidable - Stromae	40/40	40
10	4	9 (final)	Alizée	Grégoire Lyonnet	Rumba	Pas toi - Tal	79/80	39.5

=== Worst routines ===
The worst routines according to the judges' marks are as follows (out of 40)

Ranking	Season	Week	Celebrity	Professional partner	Style	Music	Note	Note (/40)
1	1	2	Marthe Mercadier	Grégoire Lyonnet	Jive	Just Because Of You from Les Bronzés font du ski	11/30	14.67
2	14	1	Nelson Monfort	Calisson Goasdoué	American Smooth	Parade - Victor Le Masne	15/40	15
3	2	1	Baptiste Giabiconi	Fauve Hautot	Quickstep	Moi Je Joue – Brigitte Bardot	12/30	16
3	9	1	Jeanfi Janssens	Marie Denigot	Quickstep	I'm Still Standing - Elton John	16/40	16
3	9	2	Jeanfi Janssens	Marie Denigot	Samba	Crazy in Love - Beyoncé Ft Jay-Z	16/40	16
3	13	2	Caroline Margeridon	Christian Millette	Tango	Man! I Feel Like a Woman! - Shania Twain	16/40	16
7	6	2	Thierry Samitier	Emmanuelle Berne	Rumba	Still Loving You - Scorpions	17/40	17
7	13	4	Cœur de pirate	Nicolas Archambault	Tango	Divine Idylle - Vanessa Paradis	17/40	17
7	14	3	Nelson Monfort	Calisson Goasdoué	Tango	Everybody (Backstreet's Back) - Backstreet Boys	17/40	17
10	2	1	Cédric Pioline	Katrina Patchett	Rumba	Rolling in the Deep – Adele	13/30	17.33

=== Genders ===
Gender	Number of contestant	Number of winners	Average (/40)	Best average (/40)	Worst average (/40)
Males^{1}	79	11	28.11	Loïc Nottet (36.82)	Nelson Monfort (16.00)
Females	82	4	28.18	Lénie (37.00)	Caroline Margeridon (18.00)

^{1}David Douillet from Season 12 didn't got a single note so, he's not counted in the averages.

=== Seasons by average note ===
Ranking	Season	Average (/40)	Best note (/40)			Worst note (/40/)		
Ranking	Season	Average (/40)	Note	Couple	Dance	Note	Couple	Dance
1	7	32.09	39	Camille Lou & Grégoire Lyonnet	Jazz Broadway	20	Julien Lepers & Silvia Notargiacomo	Cha-Cha-Cha
2	5	31.99	38.5	Rayane Bensetti & Denitsa Ikonomova Nathalie Péchalat & Christophe Licata	Jive Samba	19.5	Joyce Jonathan & Julien Brugel	Flamenco
3	6	31.28	40	Loïc Nottet & Denitsa Ikonomova	Jazz Broadway Contemporary	17	Thierry Samitier & Emmanuelle Berne	Rumba
4	14	31.16	40	Lénie & Jordan Mouillerac	Waltz	15	Nelson Monfort & Calisson Goasdoué	American Smooth
5	15	31.05	40	Samuel Bambi & Ana Riera	Samba / Rumba / Contemporary	22	Philippe Lellouche & Katrina Patchett	Tango American Smooth
6	8	31.04	40	Agustín Galiana & Candice Pascal Lenni-Kim & Marie Denigot Tatiana Silva & Christophe Licata	Paso Doble Quickstep; Contemporary	18	Camille Lacourt & Hajiba Fahmy	Rumba
7	4	30.97	39.5	Alizée & Grégoire Lyonnet	Rumba	21	Keen'V & Fauve Hautot	Paso Doble
8	3	30.57	40	Amel Bent & Christophe Licata	Rumba	19	Gérard Vivès & Silvia Notargiacomo	Quickstep
9	9	29.48	39	Clément Rémiens & Denitsa Ikonomova	Jazz Broadway	19	Jeanfi Janssens & Marie Denigot	Quickstep Samba
10	1	29.40	39.33	Sofia Essaïdi & Maxime Dereymez	Rumba	14.67	Marthe Mercadier & Grégoire Lyonnet	Jive
11	12	28.93	39	Billy Crawford & Fauve Hautot Carla Lazzari & Pierre Mauduy	Paso Doble Freestyle	19	Théo Fernandez & Alizée Bois Clémence Castel & Candice Pascal	Quickstep Argentine Tango
12	11	28.90	40	Tayc & Fauve Hautot	Freestyle	20	Lââm & Maxime Dereymez	Quickstep
13	2	28.81	38	Baptiste Giabiconi & Fauve Hautot	Rumba	16	Baptiste Giabiconi & Fauve Hautot	Quickstep
14	10	28.72	39	Sami El Gueddari & Fauve Hautot (in trio with Pauline Déroulède	Contemporary	19	Yoann Riou & Emmanuelle Berne	Jazz Broadway Rumba
15	13	28.26	39	Inès Reg & Christophe Licata	Samba	16	Caroline Margeridon & Christian Millette	Tango

== All dances by season ==
Dances (by order of appearance)	Season 1	Season 2	Season 3	Season 4	Season 5	Season 6	Season 7	Season 8	Season 9	Season 10	Season 11	Season 12	Season 13	Season 14	Season 15
Waltz															
Quickstep															
Cha-Cha-Cha															
Jive															
Rumba															
Tango															
Paso Doble															
Foxtrot															
Samba															
Viennese Waltz															
Salsa															
Charleston															
Freestyle															
American Smooth															
Contemporary															
Bollywood															
Flamenco															
Bolero															
Modern Jazz															
Disco dancing															
Boogie-woogie															
Jazz Broadway															
Rock'n'Roll															
Country															
Ballet															
Hip Hop															
Afro Jazz															
Lindy Hop															
Argentine Tango															
Mambo															
Jazz															
Total by season	13	13	12	22	23	20	19	16	16	20	16	16	16	15	18

== Ratings ==
Season	Number of episodes	Timeslot	Broadcast period		Viewers		
Season	Number of episodes	Timeslot	First Episode	Last Episode	First Episode	Last Episode	Average
1	6	Saturday, 8h50 PM	12 February 2011	19 March 2011	4 840 000 (23,9 %)	4 960 000 (24,3 %)	5 023 166 (24,51 %)
2	7	Saturday, 8h50 PM	8 October 2011	19 November 2011	5 318 000 (26,1 %)	5 335 000 (25,2 %)	4 967 000 (24,2 %)
3	9	Saturday, 8h50 PM	6 October 2012	1 December 2012	5 860 000 (28,3 %)	5 666 000 (27,7 %)	5 561 000 (26,4 %)
Special Christmas	1	Saturday, 8h50 PM	22 December 2012		4 569 000 (21,2 %)		
4	9	Saturday, 8h50 PM	28 September 2013	23 November 2013	6 016 000 (28,9 %)	6 028 000 (28,2 %)	5 880 666 (27,5 %)
5	10	Saturday, 8h50 PM	27 September 2014	29 November 2014	5 097 000 (27,7 %)	5 074 000 (25,1 %)	4 986 800 (24,7 %)
6	9	Saturday, 8h50 PM	24 October 2015	23 December 2015	4 941 000 (24,1 %)	5 303 000 (23.8%)	4 754 000 (22,4 %)
7	10	Saturday, 8h50 PM	22 October 2016	16 December 2016	5 560 000 (28,6 %)	4 912 000 (22,4 %)	4 733 400 (23,3 %)
Le grand show	1	Saturday, 8h50 PM	4 February 2017		2 980 000 (15,4 %)		
8	10	Saturday, 8h50 PM	14 October 2017	13 December 2017	4 154 000 (22,7 %)	4 092 000 (18,8 %)	4 133 600 (20,0 %)
9	10	Saturday, 8h50 PM	29 September 2018	1 December 2018	4 671 000 (24,2 %)	4 229 000 (20,4 %)	4 188 400 (20,7 %)
10	10	Saturday, 8h50 PM	21 September 2019	23 November 2019	3 586 000 (19,8 %)	3 130 000 (16,1 %)	3 263 400 (17,1 %)
11	11	Friday 9h10 PM	17 September 2021	26 November 2021	4 326 000 (22,4 %)	4 227 000 (21,2 %)	3 771 400 (19,5 %)
12	10	Friday 9h10 PM	9 September 2022	11 November 2022	3 029 000 (16,9 %)	2 778 000 (15 %)	2 628 000 (14,3 %)
13	10	Friday 9h10 PM	16 February 2024	26 April 2024	3 770 000 (21,9 %)	3 035 000 (21.6 %)	3 125 000 (20,6 %)
14	11	Friday 9h10 PM	7 February 2025	25 April 2025	3 520 000 (20,3 %)	3 520 000 (23.9 %)	2 947 000 (19,6 %)

== Tours ==
Tour	# of Shows	First Show	Last Show	Celebrity Honor Places				
Tour	# of Shows	First Show	Last Show	Winner	Runner-Up	Third Place		
2013-2014	21	19 December 2013	23 February 2014	Alizée (with Grégoire Lyonnet)	Brahim Zaibat (with Katrina Patchett)	Lorie (with Christian Millette)		
2014-2015	27	20 December 2014	28 February 2015	Rayane Bensetti (with Denitsa Ikonomova)	Alizée (with Grégoire Lyonnet)	Nathalie Péchalat (with Christophe Licata)	Gérard Vives (with Silvia Notargiacomo)	
2016	28	9 January 2016	5 March 2016	Rayane Bensetti (with Denitsa Ikonomova)	Priscilla Betti (with Christophe Licata)	Loic Nottet (with Denitsa Ikonomova)		
2017	28	7 January 2017	4 March 2017	Laurent Maistret (with Denitsa Ikonomova)	Alizée (with Grégoire Lyonnet)	Priscilla Betti (with Christophe Licata)	Olivier Dion (with Candice Pascal)	Tonya Kinzinger (with Maxime Dereymez)

== See also ==
- List of French Adaptations of Television Series from Other Countries
