= Danse avec les stars season 10 =

Danse avec les stars
- Season 10
- Celebrity winner: Sami El Gueddari
- Professional winner: Fauve Hautot

Release
- Original network: TF1
- Original release: 21 September – 23 November 2019

Season chronology
- ← Previous; Season 9 Next → Season 11

The tenth season of Danse avec les stars, (the French version of Strictly Come Dancing), aired in September 2019 on TF1, and was hosted by Camille Combal and Karine Ferri.

== Participants ==
Celebrity	Occupation / known for	Professional partner	Status
Liane Foly	Singer and Actor	Christian Millette	Eliminated 1st on 28 September 2019
Moundir Zoughari	Television personality and TV host	Katrina Patchett	Eliminated 2nd on 5 October 2019
Hugo Philip	Model and Influencer	Candice Pascal	Eliminated 3rd on 12 October 2019
Yoann Riou	Sport Commentator	Emmanuelle Berne	Eliminated 4th on 19 October 2019
Clara Morgane	TV host and Model	Maxime Dereymez	Eliminated 5th on 26 October 2019
Linda Hardy	Miss France 1992 and Actor	Christophe Licata	Eliminated 6th on 2 November 2019
Azize Diabaté	Actor	Denitsa Ikonomova	Eliminated 7th on 9 November 2019
Elsa Esnoult	Singer and Actor	Anthony Colette	Third Place on November 16, 2019
Ladji Doucouré	World champion athletics	Inès Vandamme	Runner Up on November 23, 2019
Sami El Gueddari	Paralympic athlete	Fauve Hautot	Winners on November 23, 2019

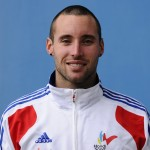
Sami El Gueddari

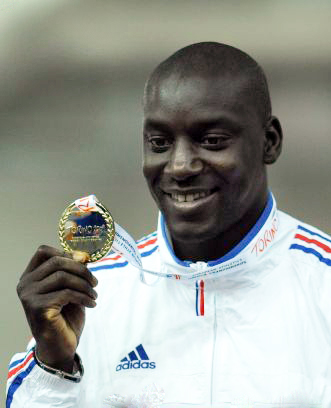
Ladji Doucouré

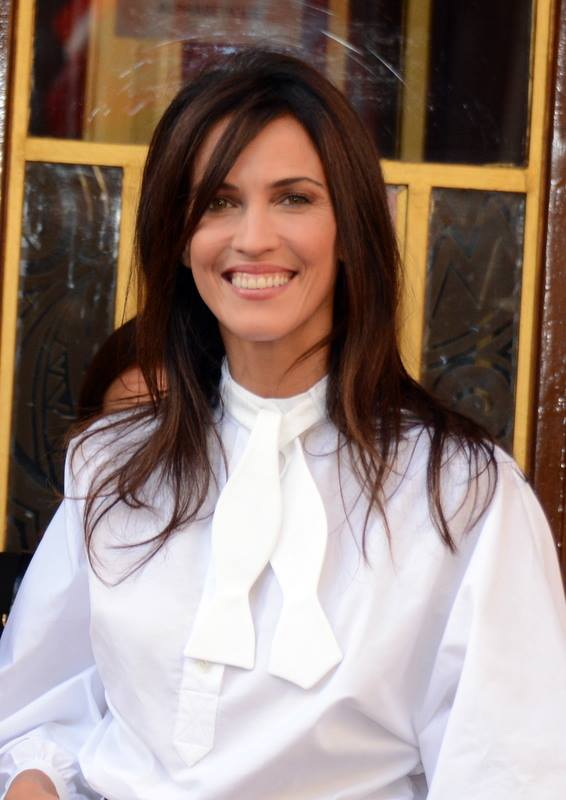
Linda Hardy

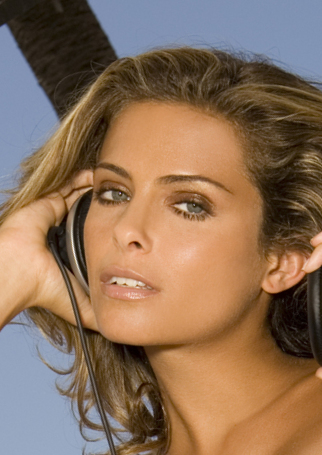
Clara Morgane

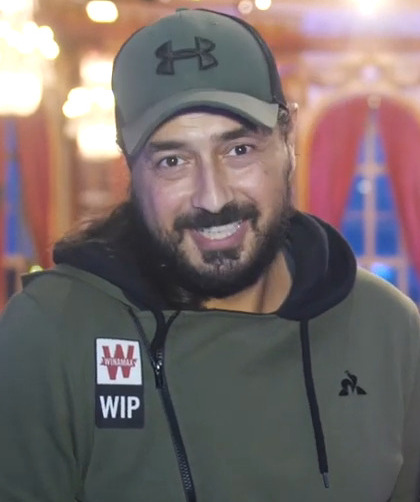
Moundir Zoughari

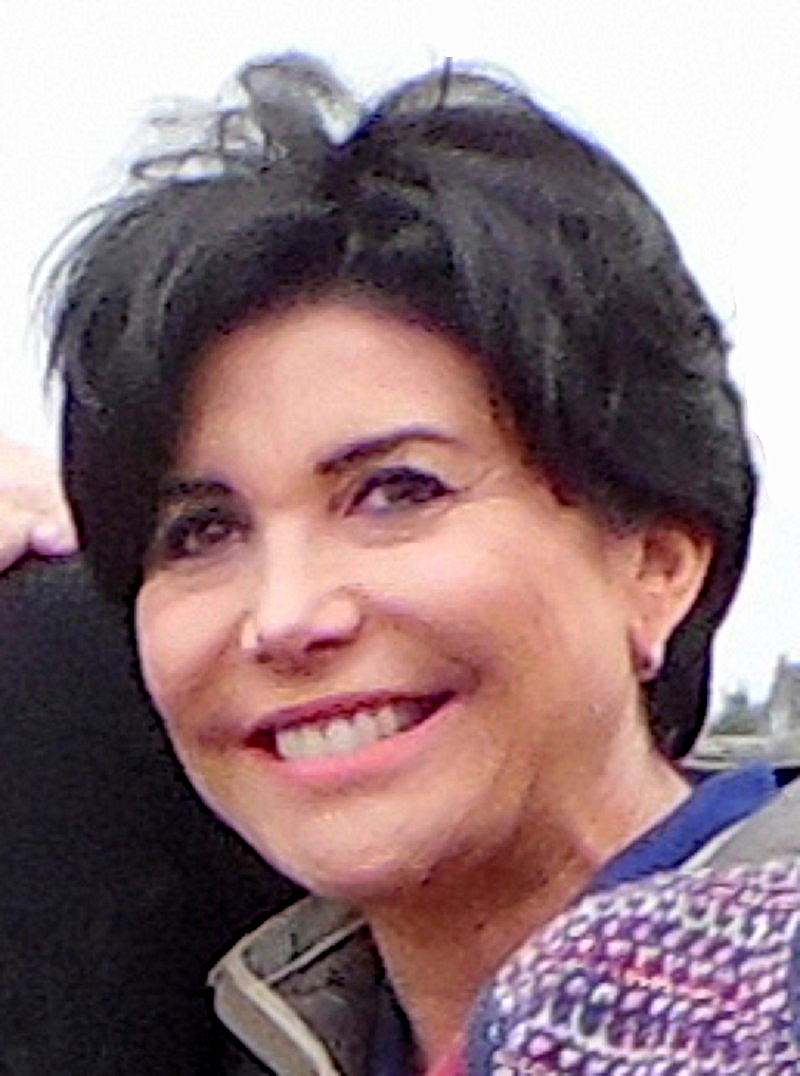
Liane Foly

== Scoring ==
Team	Place	1	2	1+2	3	4	5	6	7	8	9	10
Sami and Fauve	1	32	32	64	35 + 5 = 40	30	34	33 + 8 = 41	38 + 36 + 74	22 + 36 = 58	35 + 39 + 10 = 84	No scores
Ladji and Inès	2	24	25	49	34 + 5 = 39	29	30	28 + 12 = 40	32 + — = 32	26 + 31 = 57	35 + 37 + 15 = 87	No scores
Elsa and Anthony	3	23	25	48	27 + 0 = 27	26	28	22 + 2 = 24	29 + 25 = 54	19 + 27 = 46	29 + 28 + 5 = 62	
Azize and Denitsa	4	31	36	67	29 + 0 = 29	23	35	26 + 4 = 30	31 + 27 = 58	23 + — = 23		
Linda and Christophe	5	26	21	47	29 + 5 = 34	24	24	31 + 6 = 37	28 + 31 = 59			
Clara and Maxime	6	32	32	64	32 + 5 = 37	32	30	33 + 10 = 43				
Yoann and Emmanuelle	7	19	21	40	21 + 0 = 21	19	26					
Hugo and Candice	8	25	28	53	23 + 5 = 28	25						
Moundir and Katrina	9	24	25	49	26 + 5 = 31							
Liane and Christian	10	27	23	50								

Red numbers indicate couples with the lowest score for each week.
Blue numbers indicate couples with the highest score for each week.
Green numbers indicate couples who did not dance their second dance for each week.
indicates couples eliminated that week.
indicates the returning couple who finished in the bottom two.
indicates the winning couple.
indicates the runner-up couple.
indicates the third place couple.

=== Notes of each couples ===
Couple	Total	10	9	8	7	6	5	4	3	2	1	Average
Sami & Fauve	47	7	20	12	8	—N/a						8.6
Ladji & Inès	43	1	12	15	6	7	1	1	—N/a			7.7
Elsa & Anthony	47	—N/a	1	7	17	15	6	1	—N/a			6.6
Azize & Denitsa	35	2	7	8	11	4	1	2	—N/a			7.5
Linda & Christophe	32	—N/a		7	13	8	3	1	—N/a			6.7
Clara & Maxime	24	1	5	10	8	—N/a						8.0
Yoann & Emmanuelle	20	—N/a		1	2	5	6	6	—N/a			5.3
Hugo & Candice	16	—N/a		1	6	6	3	—N/a				6.3
Moundir & Katrina	12	—N/a		1	5	2	4	—N/a				6.3
Liane & Christian	8	—N/a		2	2	1	2	1	—N/a			6.3
Total	284	11	45	64	78	48	26	12	0	0	0	7.2

== Highest and lowest scoring performances ==
The best and worst dance performances according to the judges' marks were:

Dance	Best dancer	Best score	Worst dancer	Worst score
Jive	Sami El Gueddari	35	Linda Hardy	24
Argentine Tango	Sami El Gueddari	38	Hugo Philip	25
Jazz Broadway	Elsa Esnoult	25.3	Yoann Riou	19
Quickstep	Sami El Gueddari	32	Liane Foly; Elsa Esnoult	27
Foxtrot	Clara Morgane	32	Yoann Riou	21
Samba	Clara Morgane	32	Ladji Doucouré	24
Contemporary	Sami El Gueddari	39	Elsa Esnoult	22
Salsa	Azize Diabaté	30.7	Linda Hardy	21
Rumba	Sami El Gueddari	36	Yoann Riou	19
Paso Doble	Ladji Doucouré	34.7	Moundir Zoughari	26
Cha-Cha-Cha	Sami El Gueddari	33	Hugo Philip	23
Lindy Hop	Yoann Riou	21	Yoann Riou	21
Tango	Clara Morgane	30	Elsa Esnoult	28
American Smooth	Ladji Doucouré	37	Yoann Riou	26
Freestyle	Azize Diabaté	35	Azize Diabaté	35
Waltz	Ladji Doucouré	32	Elsa Esnoult	29
Flamenco	Elsa Esnoult	25	Elsa Esnoult	25
Bollywood	Ladji Doucouré	31	Ladji Doucouré	31
Viennese Waltz	Sami El Gueddari	36	Sami El Gueddari	36
Afro Jazz	Sami El Gueddari	35	Sami El Gueddari	35

== Couples' Highest and lowest scoring performances ==
According to the traditional 40-point scale:

Couples	Highest Scoring Dances	Lowest Scoring Dances
Sami and Fauve	Contemporary (39)	Samba (29.3)
Ladji and Inès	American Smooth (37)	Samba (24)
Elsa and Anthony	Cha-Cha-Cha; Waltz (29)	Contemporary (22)
Azize and Denitsa	Contemporary (36)	Foxtrot (23)
Linda and Christophe	Waltz; Quickstep (31)	Salsa (21)
Clara and Maxime	Jive (33)	Tango (30)
Yoann and Emmanuelle	American Smooth (26)	Jazz Broadway; Rumba (19)
Hugo and Candice	Rumba (28)	Cha-Cha-Cha (23)
Moundir and Katrina	Paso Doble (26)	Jazz Broadway (24)
Liane and Christian	Quickstep (27)	Rumba (23)

== Averages ==
This table only counts dances scored on the traditional 40-point scale.

Rank by average	Place	Couple	Total	Number of dances	Average
1	1	Sami and Fauve	402	12	34.21
2	6	Clara and Maxime	191	6	31.83
3	2	Ladji and Inès	331	11	30.79
4	4	Azize and Denitsa	261	10	29.83
5	5	Linda and Christophe	214	8	26.75
6	3	Elsa and Anthony	308	12	26.21
7	8	Hugo and Candice	101	4	25.25
8	9	Moundir and Katrina	75	3	25.00
8	10	Liane and Christian	50	2	25.00
10	7	Yoann and Emmanuelle	106	5	21.20

== Styles, scores and songs ==
=== Week 1 ===
Individual judges scores in the chart below (given in parentheses) appeared in this order from left to right: Patrick Dupond, Shy'm, Chris Marques, Jean-Marc Généreux.

Running order

Couple	Score	Style	Music
Azize and Denitsa	31 (9,8,7,7)	Jive	Le coach - Soprano Ft Vincenzo
Clara and Maxime	32 (9,9,7,7)	Argentine Tango	Africa - Julien Doré
Moundir and Katrina	24 (7,7,5,5)	Jazz Broadway	Les plaisirs démodés - Charles Aznavour
Sami and Fauve	32 (9,8,7,8)	Quickstep	Hey Mama - The Black Eyed Peas Ft Tippa Irie
Liane and Christian	27 (8,8,5,6)	Quickstep	Single Ladies (Put a Ring on It) - Beyoncé
Elsa and Anthony	23 (7,6,5,5)	Foxtrot	It's All Coming Back to Me Now - Céline Dion
Ladji and Inès	24 (7,6,6,5)	Samba	Je danse le Mia - IAM
Linda and Christophe	26 (7,7,6,6)	Argentine Tango	I Want Your Sex - George Michael
Yoann and Emmanuelle	19 (6,5,4,4)	Jazz Broadway	Soul Bossa Nova - Quincy Jones
Hugo and Candice	25 (7,7,6,5)	Argentine Tango	Señorita - Shawn Mendes Ft Camila Cabello

=== Week 2 : Love Night ===
Individual judges scores in the chart below (given in parentheses) appeared in this order from left to right: Patrick Dupond, Shy'm, Chris Marques, Jean-Marc Généreux.

Running order

Couple	Score	Style	Music	Result
Clara and Maxime	32 (8,9,8,7)	Foxtrot	The Rose - Bette Midler	Safe
Azize and Denitsa	36 (9,10,9,8)	Contemporary	Manitoumani - Matthieu Chedid, Fatoumata Diawara, Sidiki Diabaté Ft Toumani Diabaté	Safe
Moundir and Katrina	25 (7,7,6,5)	Samba	Prince Ali - Richard Darbois	Bottom 2
Linda and Christophe	21 (6,6,4,5)	Salsa	Bamboléo - Gipsy Kings	Safe
Yoann and Emmanuelle	21 (6,6,4,5)	Foxtrot	Fais-moi une place - Julien Clerc	Safe
Sami and Fauve	32 (9,8,7,8)	Rumba	Shallow - Lady Gaga and Bradley Cooper	Safe
Elsa and Anthony	25 (7,7,6,5)	Samba	Pookie - Aya Nakamura	Safe
Ladji and Inès	25 (8,7,6,4)	Foxtrot	One - U2 Ft Mary J. Blige	Safe
Liane and Christian	23 (7,7,4,5)	Rumba	How Deep Is Your Love - Bee Gees	Eliminated
Hugo and Candice	28 (8,7,7,6)	Rumba	Longtemps - Amir Haddad	Safe
Face To Face
Moundir & Katrina	66%	Cha-Cha-Cha	Right Round - Flo Rida & Kesha	Safe
Liane & Christian	34%	Cha-Cha-Cha	Right Round - Flo Rida & Kesha	Eliminated

=== Week 3 : The Judges's challenge ===
Individual judges scores in the chart below (given in parentheses) appeared in this order from left to right: Patrick Dupond, Shy'm, Chris Marques, Jean-Marc Généreux.

Running order

Couple	Score	Challenge	Total	Style	Music	Result
Clara and Maxime	32 (8,8,8,8)	+5	37	Samba	Problem - Ariana Grande Ft Iggy Azalea	Safe
Moundir and Katrina	26 (8,7,5,6)	+5	31	Paso Doble	Ameksa - Taalbi Brothers	Eliminated
Linda and Christophe	29 (7,7,7,8)	+5	34	Rumba	Il me dit que je suis belle - Patricia Kaas	Safe
Hugo and Candice	23 (6,6,5,6)	+5	28	Cha-Cha-Cha	Want to Want Me - Jason Derulo	Bottom 2
Sami and Fauve	35 (10,9,8,8)	+5	40	Jive	Ça (c'est vraiment toi) - Téléphone	Safe
Azize and Denitsa	29 (9,8,6,6)	+0	29	Quickstep	Town Called Malice - The Jam	Safe
Elsa and Anthony	27 (8,7,6,6)	+0	27	Quickstep	Halo/Walking on Sunshine - Glee	Safe
Ladji and Inès	34 (9,8,8,9)	+5	39	Contemporary	Believer - Imagine Dragons	Safe
Yoann and Emmanuelle	21 (7,5,4,5)	+0	21	Lindy Hop	Gimme Some Lovin' - The Blues Brothers	Safe
Face To Face
Hugo & Candice	67%			Jive	Footloose – Kenny Loggins	Safe
Moundir & Katrina	33%			Jive	Footloose – Kenny Loggins	Eliminated

=== Week 4 : Celine Dion Week ===
Individual judges scores in the chart below (given in parentheses) appeared in this order from left to right: Patrick Dupond, Shy'm, Chris Marques, Jean-Marc Généreux.

Running order

Couple	Score	Style	Music	Result
Clara and Maxime	32 (9,8,7,8)	Contemporary	All by Myself - Celine Dion	Safe
Linda and Christophe	24 (7,6,5,6)	Cha-Cha-Cha	Dans un autre monde - Celine Dion	Safe
Ladji and Inès	29 (8,8,6,7)	Jive	River Deep – Mountain High - Celine Dion	Bottom 2
Hugo and Candice	25 (7,7,5,6)	Jive	J'irai où tu iras - Celine Dion Ft Jean-Jacques Goldman	Eliminated
Sami and Fauve	30 (9,7,7,7)	Paso Doble	The Show Must Go On - Celine Dion	Safe
Azize and Denitsa	23 (6,7,4,6)	Foxtrot	Pour que tu m'aimes encore - Celine Dion	Safe
Elsa and Anthony	26 (8,7,5,6)	Rumba	My Heart Will Go On - Celine Dion	Safe
Yoann and Emmanuelle	19 (6,5,4,4)	Rumba	D'amour ou d'amitié - Celine Dion	Safe
Face To Face
Ladji & Inès	58%	Cha-Cha-Cha	Prière Païenne – Céline Dion	Safe
Hugo & Candice	42%	Cha-Cha-Cha	Prière Païenne – Céline Dion	Eliminated

=== Week 5 : 10 Years Week ===
Individual judges scores in the chart below (given in parentheses) appeared in this order from left to right: Patrick Dupond, Shy'm, Chris Marques, Jean-Marc Généreux.

Running order

Couple	Guest	Score	Style	Music	Result
Linda and Christophe	Amel Bent	24 (6,6,5,7)	Jive	Yes - Merry Clayton	Safe
Clara and Maxime	Tatiana Silva	30 (8,8,7,7)	Tango	Bad Guy - Billie Eilish	Bottom 2
Sami and Fauve	Laurent Maistret	34 (9,9,8,8)	Contemporary	Trop Beau - Lomepal	Safe
Elsa and Anthony	Iris Mittenaere	28 (8,7,6,7)	Tango	La Grenade - Clara Luciani	Safe
Yoann and Emmanuelle	Lenni-Kim	26 (8,7,5,6)	American Smooth	S.O.S D'un Terrien En Détresse - Grégory Lemarchal	Eliminated
Azize and Denitsa	Loïc Nottet	35 (8,10,8,9)	Freestyle	Speed - Zazie	Safe
Ladji and Inès	Brahim Zaibat	30 (9,8,6,7)	Cha-Cha-Cha	Blurred Lines - Robin Thicke	Safe
Face To Face
Clara & Maxime	74%		Samba	Miami – Will Smith	Safe
Yoann & Emmanuelle	26%		Samba	Miami – Will Smith	Eliminated

=== Week 6 : Dance with the kids Week ===
Individual judges scores in the chart below (given in parentheses) appeared in this order from left to right: Patrick Dupond, Shy'm, Chris Marques, Jean-Marc Généreux.

Running order

Couple	Guest(s)	Score	Total	Style	Music	Result
Azize and Denitsa	Dayana Desvennes & Mica Petit	26 (7,7,5,7)		Samba	ABC - Jackson 5	Safe
Elsa and Anthony	Mila Nedelec	22 (7,6,4,5)		Contemporary	Elastic Heart - Sia	Safe
Ladji and Inès	Cassandra Lecoq & Robine-André Bickindou	28 (8,7,6,7)		Quickstep	Incredibles 2 theme - Michael Giacchino	Bottom 2
Linda and Christophe	Léna & Valentin Gonzales	31 (8,8,7,8)		Waltz	J'Envoie Valser - Zazie	Safe
Clara and Maxime	Maé Aunave & Nathan Mandon	33 (10,9,7,7)		Jive	Proud Mary - Glee	Eliminated
Sami and Fauve	Kacie Katteau, Ruben Tanghe, Apolline Cherghaoui & Ethan Soranzo	33 (9,8,7,9)		Cha-Cha-Cha	En feu - Soprano	Safe
Best Lift Challenge
Ladji & Inès		+ 12	40	/	One Kiss - Calvin Harris & Dua Lipa	
Clara & Maxime		+ 10	43	/	One Kiss - Calvin Harris & Dua Lipa	
Sami & Fauve		+ 8	41	/	One Kiss - Calvin Harris & Dua Lipa	
Linda & Christophe		+ 6	37	/	One Kiss - Calvin Harris & Dua Lipa	
Azize & Denitsa		+ 4	30	/	One Kiss - Calvin Harris & Dua Lipa	
Elsa & Anthony		+ 2	24	/	One Kiss - Calvin Harris & Dua Lipa	
Face To Face
Ladji & Inès		56%		Jive	Runaway Baby - Bruno Mars	Safe
Clara & Maxime		44%		Jive	Runaway Baby - Bruno Mars	Eliminated

=== Week 7 : Halloween and Dancers Week ===
Individual judges scores in the chart below (given in parentheses) appeared in this order from left to right: Patrick Dupond, Shy'm, Chris Marques, Jean-Marc Généreux.

Running order

Couple	Score	Total	Style	Music	Result
Azize and Denitsa	31 (7,9,7,8)	58	Argentine Tango	Thriller / Heard Will Roll - Glee	Safe
Azize and Denitsa	27 (9,7,4,7)	58	Rumba	Alter Ego - Jean-Louis Aubert	Safe
Linda and Christophe	28 (7,7,7,7)	59	Paso Doble	O Fortuna - Carl Orff	Eliminated
Linda and Christophe	31 (8,8,7,8)	59	Quickstep	Smile - Michael Bublé	Eliminated
Ladji and Inès	32 (8,8,8,8)	32	Waltz	You Don't Own Me - Grace & G-Eazy	Bottom 2
Ladji and Inès	/	32	Jazz Broadway	Cell Block Tango - Chicago	Bottom 2
Elsa and Anthony	29 (9,7,6,7)	54	Cha-Cha-Cha	Men In Black - Will Smith	Safe
Elsa and Anthony	25 (7,7,5,6)	54	Flamenco	A Mi Manera - Gipsy Kings	Safe
Sami and Fauve	38 (10,10,9,9)	74	Argentine Tango	Toxic - 2WEI	Safe
Sami and Fauve	36 (9,10,8,9)	74	Rumba	Je t'aimais, je t'aime, je t'aimerai - Francis Cabrel	Safe
Face To Face
Ladji & Inès	51%		Tango	Rock It - Ofenbach	Safe
Linda & Christophe	49%		Tango	Rock It - Ofenbach	Eliminated

=== Week 8 : Judges Week ===
Individual judges scores in the chart below (given in parentheses) appeared in this order from left to right: Patrick Dupond, Shy'm, Chris Marques, Jean-Marc Généreux.

For the first routine, each couple dance in trio with one of the judge.

Shy'm being injured couldn't perform and so was replaced by Candice Pascal for her trio with Sami & Fauve.

Running order

Couple	Score	Total	Style	Music	Result
Azize and Denitsa	23 (8,8,7)	23	Salsa (with Chris Marques)	Mon Beau-Frère - Black M	Eliminated
Azize and Denitsa	/	23	/	/	Eliminated
Elsa and Anthony	19 (7,6,6)	46	Jazz Broadway (with Patrick Dupond)	My Heart Belongs to Daddy - Marilyn Monroe	Safe
Elsa and Anthony	27 (8,7,6,6)	46	American Smooth	Un Roman D'amitié - Elsa & Glenn Medeiros	Safe
Ladji and Inès	26 (8,9,9)	57	Paso Doble (with Jean-Marc Généreux)	King Is Born - Aloe Blacc	Safe
Ladji and Inès	31 (6,8,8,9)	57	Bollywood	Alane - Wes	Safe
Sami and Fauve	22 (7,8,7)	58	Samba (with Candice Pascal)	24K Magic - Bruno Mars	Bottom 2
Sami and Fauve	36 (9,9,9,9)	58	Viennesse Waltz	Je T'Aime - Lara Fabian	Bottom 2
Face To Face
Sami & Fauve	70%		Jive	I'm Still Standing - Elton John	Safe
Azize & Denitsa	30%		Jive	I'm Still Standing - Elton John	Eliminated

=== Week 9 : Semi Final ===
Individual judges scores in the chart below (given in parentheses) appeared in this order from left to right: Patrick Dupond, Shy'm, Chris Marques, Jean-Marc Généreux.

Running order

Couple	Score	Total	Style	Music	Result
Sami and Fauve	35 (9,8,9,9)	74	Afro Jazz	Shape of You - Wouter Kellerman & Ndlovu Youth Choir	Bottom 2
Sami and Fauve	39 (10,10,9,10)	74	Contemporary (with Pauline Déroulède)	Always Remember Us This Way - Lady Gaga	Bottom 2
Elsa and Anthony	29 (8,7,6,8)	57	Waltz	Never Tear Us Apart - Paloma Faith	Eliminated
Elsa and Anthony	28 (8,7,6,7)	57	Jive (with Shylee Bendovaa)	Jailhouse Rock - Riverdale	Eliminated
Ladji and Inès	35 (9,8,9,9)	72	Contemporary	Tout oublier - Angèle & Roméo Elvis	Safe
Ladji and Inès	37 (9,9,9,10)	72	American Smooth (with Aude Michon)	Yalla - Calogero	Safe
Megamix
Ladji and Inès	+ 15	87	Jive + Rumba + Tango	Faith - Stevie Wonder & Ariana Grande + Je m'en vais - Vianney + Come Together - Gary Clark Jr.	
Sami and Fauve	+ 10	84	Jive + Rumba + Tango	Faith - Stevie Wonder & Ariana Grande + Je m'en vais - Vianney + Come Together - Gary Clark Jr.	
Elsa and Anthony	+ 5	62	Jive + Rumba + Tango	Faith - Stevie Wonder & Ariana Grande + Je m'en vais - Vianney + Come Together - Gary Clark Jr.	
Face To Face
Sami & Fauve	74%		Cha-Cha-Cha	Giant - Calvin Harris & Rag'n'Bone Man	Safe
Elsa & Anthony	26%		Cha-Cha-Cha	Giant - Calvin Harris & Rag'n'Bone Man	Eliminated

=== Week 10 : Final ===
Individual judges scores in the chart below (given in parentheses) appeared in this order from left to right: Patrick Dupond, Shy'm, Chris Marques, Jean-Marc Généreux.

Running order

Couple	Heart Stroke	Style	Music	Result
Sami and Fauve	Patrick Dupond / Shy'M / Chris Marques / Jean-Marc Généreux	Jive	Can't Hold Us - Macklemore, Ryan Lewis & Ray Dalton	-
Sami and Fauve	-	Quickstep	Hey Mama - The Black Eyed Peas Ft Tippa Irie	-
Ladji and Inès	-	Cha-Cha-Cha	September - Earth, Wind & Fire	/
Ladji and Inès	Patrick Dupond / Shy'M / Chris Marques / Jean-Marc Généreux	Contemporary	Believer - Imagine Dragons	/
Last Dance
Sami and Fauve	Patrick Dupond	Freestyle	Voilà C'Est Fini - Jean-Louis Aubert	62%
Ladji and Inès	Patrick Dupond / Shy'M / Chris Marques / Jean-Marc Généreux	Freestyle	Avant Toi - Slimane & Vitaa	38%

== Dance Chart ==
Couple	1	2	3	4	5	6	7		8		9			10		
Sami & Fauve	Quickstep	Rumba	Jive	Paso Doble	Contemporary (with Laurent)	Cha-Cha-Cha (with Kacie, Ruben, Apolline & Ethan)	Argentine Tango	Rumba	Samba (with Candice)	Viennese Waltz	Afro Jazz	Contemporary (with Pauline)	Jive / Rumba / Tango (Megamix)	Jive	Quickstep	Freestyle
Ladji & Inès	Samba	Foxtrot	Contemporary	Jive	Cha-Cha-Cha (with Brahim)	Quickstep (with Cassandra & Robine-André)	Waltz		Paso Doble (with Jean-Marc)	Bollywood	Contemporary	American Smooth (with Aude)	Jive / Rumba / Tango (Megamix)	Cha-Cha-Cha	Contemporary	Freestyle
Elsa & Anthony	Foxtrot	Samba	Quickstep	Rumba	Tango (with Iris)	Contemporary (with Mila)	Cha-Cha-Cha	Flamenco	Jazz Broadway (with Patrick)	American Smooth	Waltz	Jive (with Shylee)	Jive / Rumba / Tango (Megamix)			
Azize & Denitsa	Jive	Contemporary	Quickstep	Foxtrot	Freestyle (with Loïc)	Samba (with Dayana & Mica)	Argentine Tango	Rumba	Salsa (with Chris)							
Linda & Christophe	Argentine Tango	Salsa	Rumba	Cha-Cha-Cha	Jive (with Amel)	Waltz (with Léna & Valentin)	Paso Doble	Quickstep								
Clara & Maxime	Argentine Tango	Foxtrot	Samba	Contemporary	Tango (with Tatiana)	Jive (with Maé & Nathan)										
Yoann & Emmanuelle	Jazz Broadway	Foxtrot	Lindy Hop	Rumba	American Smooth (with Lenni-Kim)											
Hugo & Candice	Argentine Tango	Rumba	Cha-Cha-Cha	Jive												
Moundir & Katrina	Jazz Broadway	Samba	Paso Doble													
Liane & Christian	Quickstep	Rumba														

Highest scoring dance
Lowest scoring dance
Danced, but not scored

== Around the Show ==
=== Host ===
Camille Combal and Karine Ferri returned as the hosts of the show for the second year.

=== Jury ===
Chris Marques and Jean-Marc Généreux, remained on the jury, with Shy'm joining for her fourth season as judge and Patrick Dupond for his second season.

=== Dancers ===
Professional dancer Marie Denigot was replaced by Inès Vandamme.

=== Contestant ===
The first contestant officially announced by TF1 was Liane Foly, on July 19, 2019. Four days later, Linda Hardy officially joined the show as a contestant

=== Around the Show ===
- André Manoukian who did the first season of Danse avec les stars was Liane Foly's ex-husband.
- Linda Hardy was the sixth Miss France to perform on the show.
- Hugo Philip had been dating Caroline Receveur who did the seventh season of Danse avec les stars.
- Sami El Gueddari became the first paralympic contestant and winner of the show
