= Patrick Dupond =

French dancer (1959–2021)

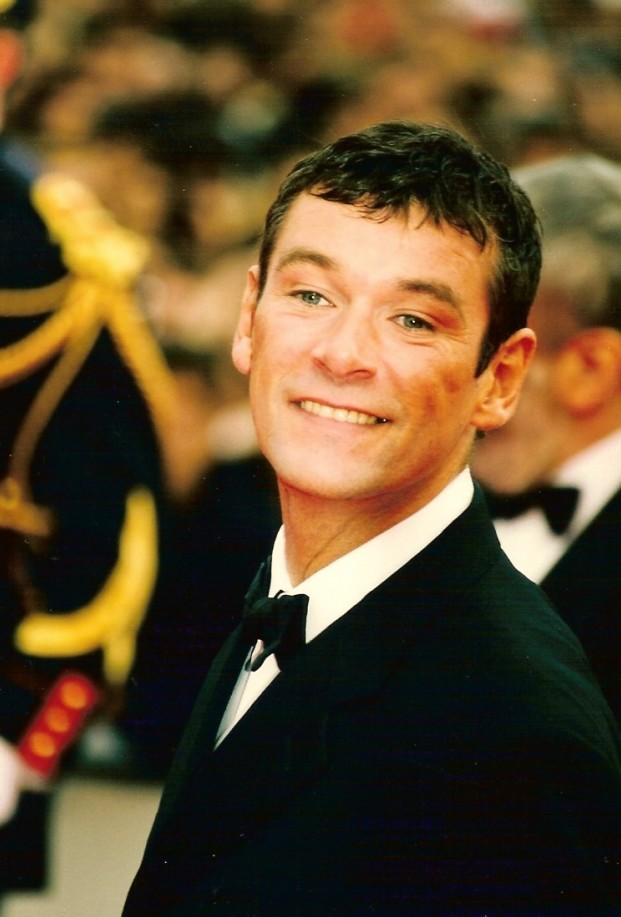
- Dupond at the 1997 Cannes Film Festival
- Born: 14 March 1959
- Died: 5 March 2021 (aged 61)
- Education: Paris Opera Ballet
- Occupations: Ballet dancer; Artistic director
- Organizations: Paris Opera Ballet; Ballet de Lorraine

Patrick Dupond (14 March 1959 – 5 March 2021) was a French ballet dancer and artistic director.

He made a name for himself in 1976 when he won the gold medal at the Varna International Ballet Competition in Bulgaria. A virtuoso dancer, he was named danseur étoile of the Paris Opera Ballet in 1980 and met with considerable success in France, which did not prevent him from having an international career. He worked with eminent dancers such as Rudolf Nureyev, Maurice Béjart and Alvin Ailey, and in 1990 he became dance director of the Paris Opera Ballet, succeeding Nureyev. He left this position in 1995, then the Paris Opera in 1997, dismissed, in his words, for "his insubordination and indiscipline". Subsequently, he appeared on various occasions on television sets as a contestant or juror for shows (for example: Danse avec les stars) while continuing to perform on stage.

== Early life and training ==
Dupond's father left the family early. Patrick Dupond spent a simple and modest childhood with his mother and her partner. In order to channel her son's energy, his mother decided to enroll him in a football club and then in judo classes, but he quickly abandoned these activities. He discovered his vocation by watching a ballet class, and his mother enrolled him in a dance class. His abilities were quickly noticed, and his dance teacher advised him to take classes at a higher level. At the end of 1967, his parents met by chance Tessa Beaumont and Max Bozzoni, a former dancer at the Paris Opera Ballet. The latter immediately sensed the young dancer's talent and agreed to take over his training. In May 1968, he had to temporarily stop his school activities and dance classes. When he returned to school, he was the victim of ostracism from his classmates because of his status as a young dancer.

He was admitted to the Paris Opera Ballet in 1969, at the age of ten, for the three-month preparation course. He then passed the entrance test to the dance school and did all his training as a classical dancer there, while continuing to take private lessons with Bozzoni every evening. He continued to study with Gilbert Mayer but his main teacher remained Bozzoni. He was also a pupil at the lycée Racine in Paris.

== Paris Opera Ballet and international career ==
On 14 March 1975, Dupond became a member of the Paris Opera Ballet, at age 16. He won the gold medal at the Varna International Ballet Competition in Bulgaria, with Albrecht's variation from the second act of Giselle and Siegfried's variation from the third act of Swan Lake, the solo from the Lander's Études, Basilio's variation from Don Quixote, a variation from Le Corsaire, and finally a contemporary choreography created by him. In December of the same year, he was named coryphée.

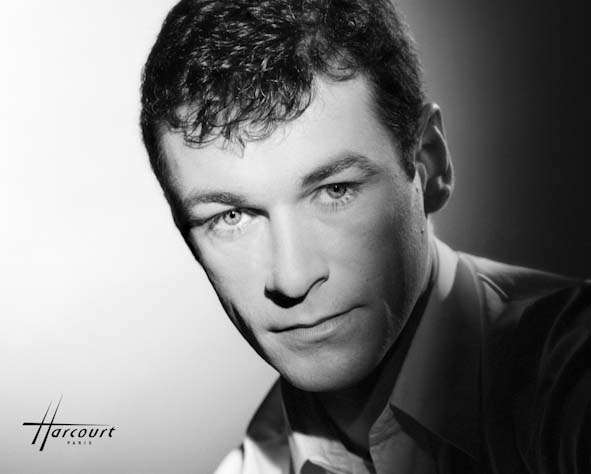
Patrick Dupond photographed in 1994 by studio Harcourt.

From then on, his career took off. He created various title roles and continued his training as a soloist. He had the opportunity to dance both at the Opera and on international stages. In December 1978, following the internal promotion contest, he was appointed premier danseur. He then danced for choreographers such as Rudolf Nureyev, Alvin Ailey and Maurice Béjart. He was named danseur étoile, the highest rank in the company, on 30 August 1980, at age 21. His ballet partners included Noëlla Pontois, Françoise Legrée, Monique Loudières, Sylvie Guillem, Isabelle Guérin and Marie-Claude Pietragalla.

Dupond was appointed artistic director of the Ballet de Lorraine in 1988. At the age of 31, Pierre Bergé appointed him the Director of Dance of the Paris Opera Ballet, a position he held from 1990 to 1995.

Choreographers such as John Neumeier, Roland Petit, Yury Grigorovich, Alwin Nikolais and Twyla Tharp gave him leading roles. He also acted and danced in several films and created the group "Dupond et ses Stars", with Sylvie Guillem, Monique Loudières, Fanny Gaida, Manuel Legris, Jean-Marie Didière and the pianist/conductor Elizabeth Cooper, for a world tour of two years.

=== Later career ===
In 1997, he was asked to be a member of the jury at the Cannes Film Festival. His absence was not accepted by the general management of the Paris Opera, who thanked him. Dupond was nevertheless offered a contract as a guest danseur étoile, a proposal he refused, preferring to go to court. His application was rejected by the Prud'hommes.

In January 2000, he was the victim of a serious car accident which forced him to both rehabilitate physically and relearn to dance. He went through a period of depression and alcoholism, from which he eventually recovered. He then resumed his training with the help of his teacher Max Bozzoni. He returned to the stage in a musical theatre in 2000: L'air de Paris at the Espace Pierre Cardin, with Manon Landowski as his partner.

Since 2004, he was a regular teacher at the dance school of Leïla Da Rocha and performs in Soissons and Saint-Quentin, Aisne. In August 2017, he announced the opening of an international dance school in Bordeaux with Leïla Da Rocha. Offering two three-year courses for young people aged 10 to 20, the school will aim to prepare young dancers to "bridge the gap between the conservatory and the opera, with local companies as well as national and international".

In 2018 and 2019, he was a member of the jury for the show Danse avec les stars.

=== Death ===
He died on 5 March 2021, a few days before his 62nd birthday, as a result of a "devastating illness", according to those close to him.

== Role creations and company premieres ==
- 1976 : Nana (Roland Petit), Mahler Lieder (Oscar Araiz)
- 1977 : Les Quatre Saisons (Kenneth MacMillan), Le Chant de la terre (Kenneth MacMillan)
- 1978 : Métaboles (Kenneth MacMillan)
- 1979 : Relâche and Sonatine bureaucratique (Moses Pendleton), Parade (after Léonide Massine), Variations (Violette Verdy), Diachronies (Janine Charrat)
- 1980 : Le Fantôme de l'Opéra (Roland Petit), Vaslaw (John Neumeier), Schéma (Alwin Nikolais)
- 1981 : Le Bal masqué (Gigi Caciuleanu), La Fille mal gardée (Heinz Spoerli's version), Le Songe d'une nuit d'été (John Neumeier), Romeo and Juliet'' (John Cranko)
- 1983 : Au bord du précipice (Alvin Ailey)
- 1985 : Arlequin magicien par amour (Ivo Cramer), Carnaval (Michel Fokine), Le Bourgeois gentilhomme (George Balanchine), No Man's Land (Rudi van Dantzig), Romeo and Juliet (Rudolf Nureyev), Angel Food (Michael Clark)
- 1986 : Salomé (Maurice Béjart)
- 1987 : Soon (Daniel Esralow)
- 1988 : Le Martyre de saint Sébastien (Bob Wilson), Demago Megalo (Patrick Dupond), Faits et gestes (Ulysses Dove), Les Illuminations (Thierry Malandain)
- 1989 : Vespers (Ulysses Dove), Bad Blood (Ulysses Dove), Rouge Poisson (Pierre Darde), Petrouchka (after Michel Fokine), Idmen (Daniel Larrieu)
- 1992 : Push Comes to the Shove (Twyla Tharp), Grand Pas (Twyla Tharp), Dances at a Gathering (Jerome Robbins), Le Tricorne (Léonide Massine), Retours de scène (Odile Duboc)
- 1993/1994 : Giselle (Mats Ek), The Nutcracker (John Neumeier), Déjà Vu (Murray Louis), Till Eulenspiegel (Vaslav Nijinsky), Camera obscura (Roland Petit)
- 1995 : Les Variations d'Ulysse (Jean-Claude Gallotta), Kurozuka (Maurice Béjart)
- 1996 : The Four Seasons (Jerome Robbins), A Suite of Dances (Jerome Robbins), Ninth Symphony (Maurice Béjart)

== Filmography ==
=== Television ===
- 1978 : Il était un musicien : Monsieur Stravinski, by Roger Hanin : Nijinski (danseur étoile)
- 1994 : Danse avec la vie, by Michel Favart : Franck Veaujour (danseur étoile)
- 1996 : Patrick Dupond le talent insolent, by Luc Riolon, France 2
- 2001 : La Cape et l'Épée : the minstrel
- 2005 : La Ferme Célébrités (season 2) on TF1
- 2005 : Celebrity Dancing sur TF1 : jury
- 2007 - 2008 : La France a un incroyable talent : juré, saison 2 et 3 sur M6
- 2014 - 2017 : Prodiges on France 2 : juré, catégorie danse
- 2018 – 2020 : Danse avec les stars : juré, saison 9 et 10 on TF1

=== Cinema ===
- 1990: Dancing Machine, by Gilles Béhat : Chico
- 1999 : Les Grandes Bouches, by Bernie Bonvoisin : the cop

== Publication ==
Dupond wrote an autobiography titled Étoile and published by Fayard in 2000 ISBN 2-213-60391-X.

== Awards ==
- 1988 : Ordre des Arts et des Lettres
- 1990 : Ordre national du Mérite
- 1997 : Legion of Honour.
