= Katrina Patchett =

Australian ballroom dancer

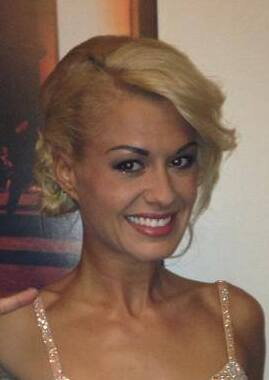
- Katrina Patchett, in 2014
- Born: 12 December 1986 (age 39); Perth, Western Australia
- Occupation: Ballroom dancer
- Spouse: Valentin d'Hoore (m. 2017; div. 2020)
- Parent: Julie Patchett

Katrina Patchett (born 12 December 1986) is a professional ballroom dancer from Perth, Western Australia.

== Early life ==
She has been dancing since the age of three and competing since the age of seven. She was brought up in her mother (Julie Patchett)'s dance studio in Perth, Western Australia, daughter of two internationally successful ballroom dancers who reached seventh in the world. At age thirteen she became a Western Australian State Champion.

== Career ==
Patchett moved to Europe at the age of 16, living, training and working in Denmark (partnering with Joachim Dahlström) before moving to France, at 19, to partner with the former winner of The Dancing Show, Maxime Dereymez. Together in 2007, they became the French national champions. The couple also reached fourth place at the IDSF Open in 2007. After three years in France, Patchett moved to Slovenia to dance with Blaz Pocajt and compete in the professional category at the age of 22. Towards the end of 2010, Dereymez and Patchett decided to renew their partnership. They both competed on TF1's Danse avec les stars. Patchett won the first season of Danse avec les stars with her partner French singer/songwriter, Matt Pokora, on 19 March 2011.

Patchett speaks French, and lives in Paris.

== Danse avec les Stars ==
Season	Partner	Notability (known for)	Place	Average (/40)
1	M. Pokora	Singer-songwriter	1st	35.59
2	Cédric Pioline	Retired tennis player	9th	17.33
3	Bastian Baker	Singer-songwriter	7th	28.25
4	Brahim Zaibat	Dancer & choreographer	2nd	35.52
5	Brian Joubert	Olympic figure skater	3rd	32.69
6	Vincent Niclo	Tenor singer & actor	7th	28.75
7	Olivier Minne	Television presenter	11th	24.50
8	Vincent Cerutti	Radio & Television presenter	10th	22.00
9	Basile Boli	Former footballer	7th	24.40
10	Moundir	Television personality and TV host	9th	25.00
12	David Douillet	Retired judoka and politician	12th	N/A^{1}
14	Claude Dartois	Koh-Lanta participant	7th	30.57
15	Philippe Lellouche	Actor, Film director & TV host	12th	22.00

^{1}David Douillet didn't got a single note in season 12.

=== Danse avec les Stars Performances ===
==== Season 1 ====
- With M. Pokora
- Average: 26.69/30
- Placed: 1st

Week #	Dance	Song	Judges' score			Total	Result
Week #	Dance	Song	Martines	Généreux	Marques	Total	Result
1	Quickstep	"We No Speak Americano" — Yolanda Be Cool & DCUP	8	8	7	23	Safe
2	Tango	"El Tango De Roxanne" — Ewan McGregor & José Feliciano	8	9	8	25	Safe
3	Foxtrot	"Charlie's Angels Theme" – The Hit Crew (from Charlie's Angels)	9	8	7	32 (24 + 8)	Safe
3	Samba Marathon	"You Should Be Dancing" – Bee Gees (from Saturday Night Fever)	+8			32 (24 + 8)	Safe
4	Jive	"Jailhouse Rock" – Elvis Presley	9	10	8	54 (27 + 27)	Safe
4	Viennese Waltz	"If I Ain't Got You" – Alicia Keys	9	10	8	54 (27 + 27)	Safe
5 Semi-finals	Charleston	"Charleston" – Green Hill Instrumental	10; 9	10; 9	9; 8	137 (55 + 52 + 30)	Safe
5 Semi-finals	Rumba	"Angels" – Robbie Williams	9; 8	10; 8	9; 8	137 (55 + 52 + 30)	Safe
5 Semi-finals	Cha-Cha-Cha Marathon	"I Will Survive" – Gloria Gaynor	+30			137 (55 + 52 + 30)	Safe
6 Finals	Paso Doble	"Thriller" – Michael Jackson	10; 10	10; 9	9; 9	114 (57 + 57)	Winners (with 62%)
6 Finals	Foxtrot	"New York, New York" – Frank Sinatra	10; 10	10; 9	10; 8	114 (57 + 57)	Winners (with 62%)
6 Finals	Freestyle	You're the One That I Want (Grease) - John Travolta & Olivia Newton-John	N/A			114 (57 + 57)	Winners (with 62%)

==== Season 2 ====
- With Cédric Pioline
- Average: 13.00/30
- Placed: 9th (last)

Week #	Dance	Song	Judges' score			Total	Result
Week #	Dance	Song	Martines	Généreux	Marques	Total	Result
1	Rumba	"Rolling in the Deep" – Adele	6	4	3	13	Eliminated (with 35%)

==== Season 3 ====
- With Bastian Baker
- Average: 28.25/40
- Placed: 7th

Week #	Dance	Song	Judges' score				Total	Result
Week #	Dance	Song	Pietragalla	Généreux	Shy'm	Marques	Total	Result
1	Tango	L'Assasymphonie - Mozart l'opéra rock	7	7	7	7	56 (28 + 28)	No Eliminations
2	Waltz	Hallelujah - Leonard Cohen	7	7	7	7	56 (28 + 28)	Safe
3	Jive	Take On Me - A-ha	8; 8	8; 7	8; 7	7; 5	68 (58 + 10)	Safe
3	Tango Team	En rouge et noir - Jeanne Mas	+10				68 (58 + 10)	Safe
4	Rumba	Comme d'habitude - Claude François	9; 8	9; 7	9; 7	8; 6	71 (63 + 8)	Safe
4	Samba Relay	I Want You Back - The Jackson 5	+8				71 (63 + 8)	Safe
5	Paso Doble	Superman soundtrack - John Williams	9; 7	7; 6	7; 6	4; 3	57 (49 + 8)	Eliminated (with 35%)
5	Cha-Cha-Cha Marathon	Boogie Wonderland - Earth, Wind & Fire	+8				57 (49 + 8)	Eliminated (with 35%)

- With Taïg Khris^{1}

Week #	Dance	Song	Judges' score				Total	Result
Week #	Dance	Song	Généreux	Pietragalla	M. Pokora	Marques	Total	Result
7^{1}	Quickstep	We No Speak Americano - Yolanda Be Cool	7; 6	7; 5	7; 6	6; 5	49	Bottom 2

^{1} Katrina came back during week 7 to dance in trio with Taïg Khris & Denitsa Ikonomova

==== Season 4 ====
- With Brahim Zaibat
- Average: 35.52/40
- Placed: 2nd

Week #	Dance	Song	Judges' score				Total	Result
Week #	Dance	Song	Pietragalla	Généreux	Shy'm	Marques	Total	Result
1	Tango	Locked Out of Heaven - Bruno Mars	7	7	9	8	66 (31 + 35)	No Eliminations
2	Contemporary dance	Papaoutai - Stromae	8	9	9	9	66 (31 + 35)	Safe
3	Bolero	Là-bas - Jean-Jacques Goldman	8; 8	5; 8	7; 7	6; 5	54	Safe
4	Cha-Cha-Cha	Boogie Wonderland - Earth, Wind & Fire	9; 9	10; 9	9; 9	8; 9	72	Safe
5	Paso Doble / Jive	My Sharona - The Knack	10; 10	9; 9	10; 9	8; 9	94 (74 + 20)	Safe
5	Samba Relay	I Follow Rivers (The Magician Remix) - Lykke Li	+20				94 (74 + 20)	Safe
6	Contemporary dance	Iron - Woodkid	9; 9	9; 9	9; 9	9; 9	143 (72 + 71)	Safe
6	Samba	Barbie Girl - Aqua	9; 9	9; 9	9; 9	8; 9	143 (72 + 71)	Safe
7	Foxtrot	New York, New York - Frank Sinatra	10; 9	9; 8	9; 9	9; 9	148 (72 + 76)	Safe
7	Rumba (in trio with Coralie Licata)	When I Was Your Man - Bruno Mars	10; 10	9; 9	10; 10	9; 9	148 (72 + 76)	Safe
8 Semi-finals	Paso Doble	"Ianuarii Ira" - Verdi Remix	9; 9	9; 9	8; 8	8; 8	173 (68 + 75 + 30)	Safe
8 Semi-finals	Quickstep	Gangnam Style - Psy	10; 9	10; 9	10; 9	9; 9	173 (68 + 75 + 30)	Safe
8 Semi-finals	Marathon (Cha-Cha-Cha + Waltz + Jive + Rumba)	"Sexy and I Know It" - LMFAO + "The Blue Danube" - Johann Strauss II + "Shake Your Tail Feather" - The Blues Brothers + "Just Give Me a Reason" - Pink	+30				173 (68 + 75 + 30)	Safe
9 Finals	Samba	I Want You Back - Jackson 5	10; 9	10; 9	10; 9	9; 9	188 (75 + 76 + 37)	Second Place (with 45%)
9 Finals	Rumba	Skyfall - Adele	10; 10	10; 9	10; 10	9; 8	188 (75 + 76 + 37)	Second Place (with 45%)
9 Finals	Megamix (Rumba + Paso Doble + Jive)	Next To Me - Emeli Sandé + Roadgame - Kavinsky + SOS - Rihanna	9	10	9	9	188 (75 + 76 + 37)	Second Place (with 45%)
9 Finals	Freestyle	"Nothing Compares 2 U" - Sinéad O'Connor	N/A				188 (75 + 76 + 37)	Second Place (with 45%)

==== Season 5 ====
- With Brian Joubert
- Average: 32.69/40
- Placed: 3rd

Week #	Dance	Song	Judges' score				Total	Result
Week #	Dance	Song	Généreux	Pietragalla	M. Pokora	Marques	Total	Result
1	Contemporary dance	Every Breath You Take – Akram Sedkaoui (The Police, Sting's song)	8	8	8	8	64 (32 + 32)	No Eliminations
2	Tango	Waka Waka (This Time for Africa) – Shakira	8	9	8	7	64 (32 + 32)	Safe
3	Ballet	Primavera – Ludovico Einaudi	8; 7	8; 6	9; 7	8; 6	59	Safe
4	Jive	Video Games – The Baseballs (Lana Del Rey's song)	8; 7	8; 8	8; 8	7; 8	62	Safe
5^{2}	Samba	Gasolina – Daddy Yankee	8; 8	9; 8	9; 8	8; 7	90 (65 + 25)	No Eliminations
5^{2}	Cha-Cha-Cha Relay	Counting Stars – OneRepublic	+25				90 (65 + 25)	No Eliminations
6	Rumba	À ma place – Zazie Ft Axel Bauer	9; 7	9; 8	9; 9	8; 8	97 (67 + 30)	Safe
6	Marathon (Jive + Flamenco + Country)	Ça (C'est vraiment toi) – Téléphone + Bella – Kendji Girac + Timber – Pitbull Ft Kesha	+30				97 (67 + 30)	Safe
7	Charleston / Samba	Les Limites – Julien Doré	9; 7	8; 7	8; 7	7; 4	90 (57 + 33)	Bottom 2 (Safe with 59%)
7	American Smooth (in duo with Corneille & Candice Pascal)	Mes Emmerdes – Dany Brillant, Philippe Lellouche & Damien Sargue (Forever Gentlemen-2)	8	9	9	7	90 (57 + 33)	Bottom 2 (Safe with 59%)
8	Waltz	Laisse-moi t'aimer – Mike Brant	8; 8	8; 8	9; 9	6; 8	136 (64 + 72)	Safe
8	Argentine Tango	Tous les memes – Stromae	9; 9	10; 9	10; 9	8; 8	136 (64 + 72)	Safe
9 Semi-finals	Paso Doble (in trio with Silvia Notargiacomo)	Party Rock Anthem – LMFAO	9; 8	9; 9	9; 9	7; 9	136 (69 + 67)	Bottom 2 (Safe with 55%)
9 Semi-finals	Foxtrot	Feel – Robbie Williams	9; 7	9; 9	9; 9	8; 7	136 (69 + 67)	Bottom 2 (Safe with 55%)
10; Finals	Rumba	J'oublierai ton nom – Johnny Hallyday & Carmel	9; 8	10; 9	10; 9	9; 8	171 (72 + 69 + 30)	Third Place
10; Finals	Jive	J'irai où tu iras – Céline Dion & Jean-Jacques Goldman	9; 9	9; 9	9; 9	8; 7	171 (72 + 69 + 30)	Third Place
10; Finals	Megamix (Charleston + Waltz + Jive)	All Night – Parov Stelar + Hijo de la Luna – Mecano + C'est comme ça – Les Rita Mitsouko	8	8	8	6	171 (72 + 69 + 30)	Third Place

- With Miguel Ángel Muñoz^{2}

Week #	Dance	Song	Judges' score				Total	Result
Week #	Dance	Song	Généreux	Pietragalla	M. Pokora	Marques	Total	Result
5^{2}	Foxtrot	Paris-Seychelles – Julien Doré	8; 8	9; 9	9; 9	9; 9	80 (70 + 10)	No Eliminations
5^{2}	Cha-Cha-Cha Relay	Counting Stars – OneRepublic	+10				80 (70 + 10)	No Eliminations

^{2} This week only, for "Partner Switch-Up" week, Brian Joubert performed with Denitsa Ikonomova instead of Katrina Patchett. Katrina performed with Miguel Ángel Muñoz.

==== Season 6 ====
- With Vincent Niclo
- Average: 28.75/40
- Placed: 7th

Week #	Dance	Song	Judges' score				Total	Result
Week #	Dance	Song	Hautot	Généreux	Pietragalla	Marques	Total	Result
1	Cha-Cha-Cha	Uptown Funk - Bruno Mars	8	5	8	5	55 (26 + 29)	No Eliminations
2	Foxtrot	Nessun dorma - Luciano Pavarotti	8	6	8	7	55 (26 + 29)	Safe
3	Tango	Here Comes the Rain Again - Eurythmics	7; 7	7; 6	7; 8	7; 6	55	Safe
4	Due to the November 2015 Paris attacks happening the night before, week 4 show was cancelled.							
5	Jive	Jailhouse Rock - Elvis Presley	8; 7	8; 5	8; 7	8; 6	57 (57 + 0)	Safe
5	Best lift challenge	Waiting For Love - Avicii	+0				57 (57 + 0)	Safe
6	Quickstep	Je Suis Ton Meilleur Ami - Richard Darbois (Aladdin)	7; 8	8; 7	9; 8	8; 8	78 (63 + 15)	Eliminated
6	Samba relay	Il En Faut Peu Pour Être Heureux – Jean Stout, Pascal Bressy & Jean Cussac (The Jungle Book)	+15				78 (63 + 15)	Eliminated

==== Season 7 ====
- With Olivier Minne
- Average: 24.50/40
- Placed: 11th (last)

Week #	Dance	Song	Judges' score				Total	Result
Week #	Dance	Song	Hautot	Généreux	Pietragalla	Marques	Total	Result
1	Foxtrot	I Still Haven't Found What I'm Looking For - U2	7	6	7	7	49 (27 + 22)	No Eliminations
2	Cha-Cha-Cha	Sing Hallelujah - Dr. Alban	7	5	6	4	49 (27 + 22)	Eliminated

==== Season 8 ====
- With Vincent Cerutti
- Average: 22.00/40
- Placed: 10th (last)

Week #	Dance	Song	Judges' score				Total	Result
Week #	Dance	Song	Archambault	Généreux	Hautot	Marques	Total	Result
1	Rumba	J'te mentirais - Patrick Bruel	6	6	6	6	44 (24 + 20)	No Eliminations
2	Foxtrot	Millésime - Pascal Obispo	5	6	5	4	44 (24 + 20)	Eliminated

==== Season 9 ====
- With Basile Boli
- Average: 24.40/40
- Placed: 7th

Week #	Dance	Song	Judges' score				Total	Result
Week #	Dance	Song	Dupond	Shy'm	Marques	Généreux	Total	Result
1	Samba	Sapés comme jamais – Maître Gims	7	6	4	4	51 (21 + 30)	No Eliminations
2	Jive	Jump – Van Halen	7	6	6	6 +5	51 (21 + 30)	Safe
3	Foxtrot	I Believe I Can Fly – R. Kelly	8	6	5	6	25	Bottom 2 (Safe with 76%)
4	Salsa	Gangnam Style – Psy	7	7	5	6	25	Safe
5	Quickstep	Bewitched theme – Howard Greenfield	7	8	5	6	30 (26 + 4)	Eliminated (with 24%)
5	Salsa Marathon	La Salsa du démon – Le Grand Orchestre du Splendid	+4				30 (26 + 4)	Eliminated (with 24%)

- With Pamela Anderson^{3}

Week #	Dance	Song	Judges' score				Total	Result
Week #	Dance	Song	Dupond	Shy'm	Marques	Généreux	Total	Result
7^{3}	Quickstep	Moi je joue – Brigitte Bardot	10	8	7	8	33	Eliminated

^{3} Katrina came back during week 7 to dance in trio with Pamela Anderson & Maxime Dereymez.

==== Season 10 ====
- With Moundir
- Average: 25.00/40
- Placed: 9th

Week #	Dance	Song	Judges' score				Total	Result
Week #	Dance	Song	Dupond	Shy'm	Marques	Généreux	Total	Result
1	Jazz Broadway	Les plaisirs démodés - Charles Aznavour	7	7	5	5	49 (24 + 25)	No Eliminations
2	Samba	Prince Ali - Richard Darbois	7	7	6	5	49 (24 + 25)	Bottom 2 (with 66%)
3	Paso Doble	Ameksa - Taalbi Brothers	8	7 +5	5	6	31	Eliminated (with 33%)

==== Season 12 ====
- With David Douillet
- Average: N/A
- Placed: 12th (last)

Week #	Dance	Song	Judges' score				Total	Result
Week #	Dance	Song	Hassani	Gillot	Marques	Alu	Total	Result
1	American Smooth	Mesdames - Grand Corps Malade	N/A					Eliminated (with 24%)

==== Season 14 ====
- With Claude Dartois
- Average: 30.57/40
- Placed: 7th

Week #	Dance	Song	Judges' score				Total	Result
Week #	Dance	Song	Généreux	Hautot	Charlot	Marques	Total	Result
2	Tango	Être à la Hauteur - Le Roi Soleil	7	8	8	7	30 (30 + 0)	No Eliminations
2	Imposed Choreography (Salsa)	Who Do You Think You Are - Spice Girls	+0				30 (30 + 0)	No Eliminations
3	American Smooth	(Everything I Do) I Do It for You - Bryan Adams	8	8	8	8	32	Safe
4	Paso Doble	He's a Pirate - Klaus Badelt (Pirates Des Caraïbes)	8	8	8	7	31	Bottom 2
5	Rumba	Shallow - Lady Gaga & Bradley Cooper (A Star Is Born)	8	7	7	7	29	Safe
6	Quickstep (in trio with Julie Patchett)	Another Day of Sun from La La Land	8	8	8	8	32	Safe
7	Waltz (in trio with Chris Marques)	Die with a Smile - Lady Gaga & Bruno Mars	8	8	8	8^{4}	32	Safe
8	Cha-Cha-Cha	Femme Like U (Donne-moi ton corps) - K.Maro	7	8	7	6	28	Eliminated

^{4} That 8 was given by the guest judge Kamel Ouali instead of Chris Marques.

==== Season 15 ====
- With Philippe Lellouche
- Average: 22.00/40
- Placed: 12th (last)

Week #	Dance	Song	Judges' score				Total	Result
Week #	Dance	Song	Généreux	Hautot	Charlot	Marques	Total	Result
2	Tango	L'assasymphonie - Mozart, l'opéra rock	6	6	6	4	22	No Eliminations
3	American Smooth	Longtemps - Amir Haddad	5	6	6	5	22	Eliminated
