= Fauve Hautot =

French dancer and choreographer (born 1986)

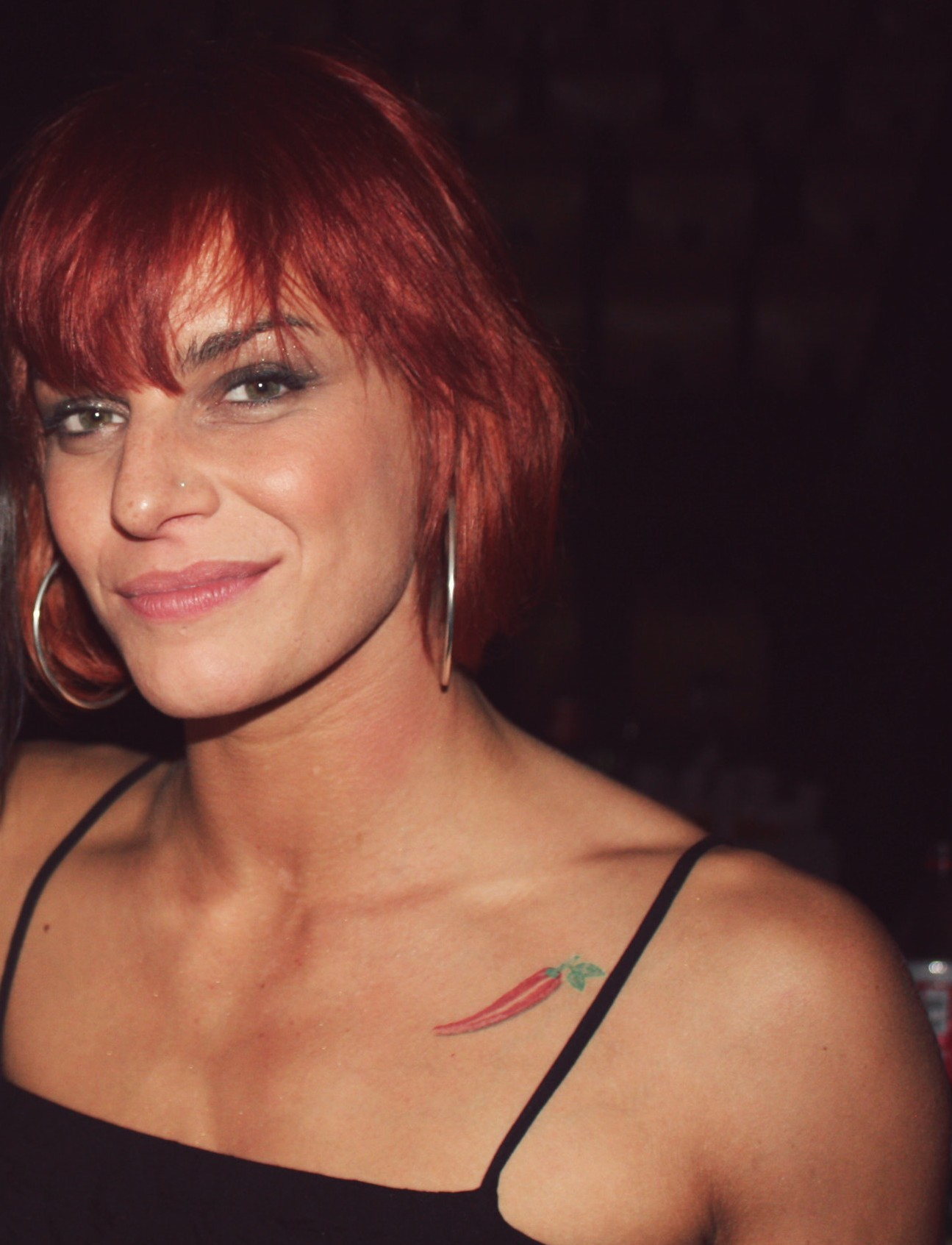
- Born: 3 March 1986 (age 39); Dieppe, Upper Normandy; France
- Occupations: Dancer, choreographer

Fauve Hautot (born 3 March 1986) is a French dancer and choreographer.

== Early life ==
Fauve Hautot was born in Dieppe. Her father was an accountant with a passion for dance, and her mother was a dance teacher. She has a younger sister, Calliope, and an older brother, Ashley. She grew up in the village of Saint-Vaast-Dieppedalle (Seine-Maritime). Her name means "wildcat" or "big cat" in French. Her parents chose the name Fauve "after seeing the series Mistral's Daughter, in which a heroine is named Fauve".

As the age of 5, she began dancing Latin dances with her brother.

== Career ==
In 2001, she was crowned junior French champion for Latin dances, runner-up in standards, and 3rd in 10 dances with Nicolas Pouget. Her 2006 victory of the TV show "Dancing Show" (which airs on France 2), alongside Maxime Dereymez (another professional dancer on Danse avec les Stars), brought her into the public eye.

== Danse avec les stars ==
From 2011, Fauve Hautot joined the team of professional dancers of the TV show Danse avec les stars . Her partners have included:

- The humorist Jean-Marie Bigard (Season 1, Spring 2011), with whom she finished fifth,
- The model Baptiste Giabiconi (Season 2, Fall 2011), with whom she finished third in the final
- The singer Emmanuel Moire (Season 3, Fall 2012), with whom she won the competition in the final,
- The model Baptiste Giabiconi (Danse avec les stars Christmas Party (2012), Christmas 2012), with whom she finished sixth,
- The singer Emmanuel Moire (Danse avec les stars Christmas Party (2012), Christmas 2012), with whom she finished fifth,
- The singer Keen'V (Season 4, autumn 2013), with whom she finished fourth in the semi-finals,
- The actor Miguel Ángel Muñoz (Season 5, autumn 2014), with whom she finished fourth in the semi-finals.
- The actor Rayane Bensetti (Season 5, autumn 2014) during the test of partner change
- The model Terence Telle (Season 9, fall 2018), with whom she finished third in the semifinals,
- The swimmer Sami El Gueddari (Season 10, fall 2019), with whom she won the competition in the final,
- The singer Tayc (Season 11, fall 2021), with whom she won the competition in the final.
- The Filipino entertainer Billy Crawford (Season 12, fall 2022), with whom she won the competition in the final.

Season	Partner	Notability (known for)	Place	Average (/40)
1	Jean-Marie Bigard	Comedian	5th	23.47
2	Baptiste Giabiconi	Model & singer	3rd	31.37
3	Emmanuel Moire	Singer & eclectic artist	1st	32.83
4	Keen'V	Singer	4th	27.30
5	Miguel Ángel Muñoz	Actor & singer	4th	31.62
9	Terence Telle	Model	3rd	32.47
10	Sami El Gueddari	Paralympic athlete	1st	34.21
11	Tayc	Singer	1st	33.91
12	Billy Crawford	Actor, singer and television presenter	1st	36.33
