= Linda Hardy =

French actress and model (born 1973)

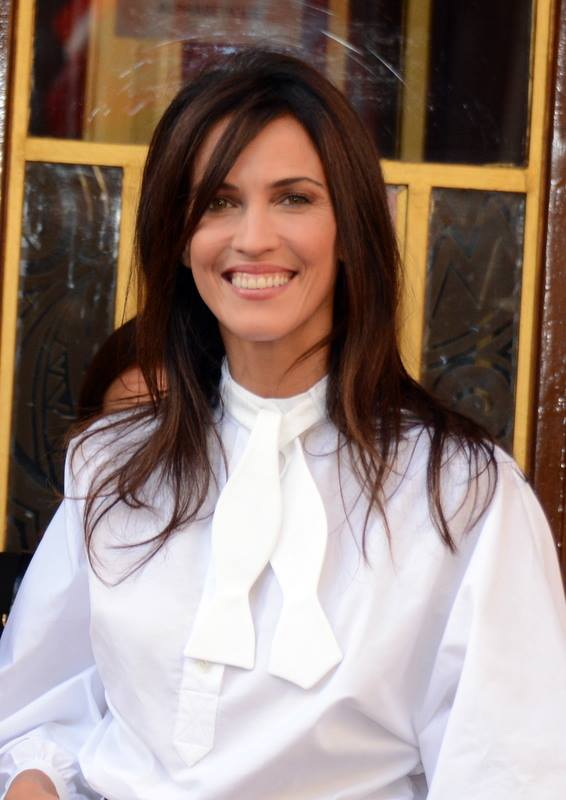
- Hardy in 2014
- Born: 11 October 1973 (age 52); Nantes, Loire-Atlantique, France
- Occupations: Actress, model
- Years active: 1992-present
- Title: Miss France (1992)
- Children: 1

Linda Hardy (born 11 October 1973) is a French actress, model and beauty pageant titleholder.

== Life and career ==
Hardy won the title of Miss France in 1992 and represented her country at Miss Universe 1992, Miss World 1992, and Miss Europe 1992.

She then launched an acting career in French cinema, beginning with the 1999 film Recto-verso, which was followed by her role as Charlotte in the TV series H in 2000.

Internationally, her best-known role to date has been as the blue-haired, blue-teared, mutant-woman-turning-human, Jill, in the 2004 science-fiction film, Immortel (released in North America as Immortal). In the film, Hardy is dubbed by an English-speaking actress (Barbara Weber-Scaff), except for one piece of dialogue delivered in her French.

Another of her roles was in a 2006 film titled A House Divided, also known as Mount of Olives. The film tells the story of Romi (Eion Bailey), a Jewish American who falls in love with Joleh (Hardy), a Palestinian woman.

She has also had roles in the film Le Souffleur and the short film Dernière chance. In addition, she has made a number of appearances on television.

From 2010-2019, she appeared in a number of further films and TV series, as below. In 2019, she participated in the tenth season of Danse avec les stars, the French version of Dancing with the Stars. She was partnered with professional dancer Christophe Licata. On November 2, 2019, they were eliminated, finishing 5th out of 10.

== Filmography ==
Year	Title	Role	Director	Notes
1999	Recto-verso	Anne	Jean-Marc Longval	
2000-01	H	Charlotte Strauss	Éric Lartigau, Peter Kassovitz, ...	TV series (8 episodes)
2004	Immortal	Jill Bioskop	Enki Bilal	
2004	Dernière chance	The woman	Gaël Cabouat	Short
2004	Le juge est une femme	Manon	Patrick Poubel	TV series (1 episode)
2005	Le souffleur	Clara	Guillaume Pixie	
2007	Léthé		Antonin Martin-Hilbert	Short
2007	La taupe	Laure Fanisse	Vincenzo Marano	TV movie
2007	Martin Paris	Anastasia	Douglas Law	TV movie
2007	Le vrai coupable	Eva Marie Sebastian	Francis Huster	TV movie
2007	Le fantôme du lac	Jeanne	Philippe Niang	TV movie
2007	Commissaire Cordier	Régina Enescu	Henri Helman	TV series (1 episode)
2008	A House Divided	Joleh Khalid	Mitch Davis	
2008	A Man and His Dog		Francis Huster	
2008	Tu peux garder un secret ?	Nina	Alexandre Arcady	
2008	La vie à une	Karine	Frédéric Auburtin	TV movie
2008-10	Section de recherches	Claire Linsky	Gérard Marx, Olivier Barma, ...	TV series (18 episodes)
2009	La taupe 2	Laure Fanisse	Vincenzo Marano	TV movie
2009	L'école du pouvoir	Mathilde Weber	Raoul Peck	TV movie
2009	The Philanthropist	Isabelle	Duane Clark	TV series (1 episode)
2010	Undercovers	Carmine	Dan Attias	TV series (1 episode)
2012	Josephine, Guardian Angel	Aurélia Sternin	Pascal Heylbroeck	TV series (1 episode)
2012-13	Enquêtes réservées	Diane Delange	Étienne Dhaene, Bénédicte Delmas, ...	TV series (11 episodes)
2012-14	Mafiosa	Livia Tavera	Hugues Pagan & Pierre Leccia	TV series (11 episodes)
2013	The Love Punch	Glaxo secretary	Joel Hopkins	
2014	R.I.S, police scientifique	Lilou	Hervé Brami & Olivier Barma	TV series (4 episodes)
2017	Mon poussin	Jeanne	Frédéric Forestier	
2017	Des amours, désamour	Julie	Dominic Bachy	
2017	Nina	Sabine	Éric Le Roux	TV series (1 episode)
2018	Le juge est une femme	Hélène Rozan	Jean-Christophe Delpias	TV series (1 episode)
Since 2018	Tomorrow is Ours	Clémentine Doucet	Jérôme Navarro, Thierry Peythieu, ...	TV series (114 episodes)
2019	Commissaire Magellan		Stéphane Kopecky	TV series (1 episode)

== Theater ==
Year	Title	Author	Director
2002	Putain de soirée !	Daniel Colas	Daniel Colas
2007	Eva	Nicolas Bedos	Daniel Colas
2008	Bains de minuit	Jack William Sloane	Daniel Colas
2012	Ladies Night	Stephen Sinclair & Anthony McCarten	Thierry Laval
2015-17	Un certain Charles Spencer Chaplin	Daniel Colas	Daniel Colas

== Personal life ==
She is the mother of a boy, Andréa, born in 2010.

Preceded by Mareva Georges	Miss France; 1992	Succeeded by Véronique de la Cruz
