= De Vlindertuin =

Coordinates: 53°5′32.53″N 6°40′48.6″E

- Interactive map of De Vlindertuin

Restaurant information
- Head chef: Jilt Cazemier
- Food type: French
- Rating: Michelin Guide
- Location: Stationsweg 41, Zuidlaren, 9471 GK, Netherlands
- Seating capacity: 40
- Website: Official website

De Vlindertuin is a restaurant located in Zuidlaren in the Netherlands. It is a fine dining restaurant that was awarded one Michelin star from 2008 to present.

GaultMillau awarded the restaurant 15.0 out of 20 points.

Head chef is Jilt Cazemier. De Vlindertuin is a member of Les Patrons Cuisiniers.

De Vlindertuin was the first recipient of the "Provincial Awards" from the magazin "Lekker" in 2008. The received the award for being the highest ranking restaurant in Drenthe in the Lekker Top 100.

The restaurant is located in a renovated Saxonian farmhouse built in 1719. It is the same building that earlier housed the Michelin starred restaurant Les Quatre Saisons.

== See also ==
- List of Michelin starred restaurants in the Netherlands
