= Danse avec les stars season 2 =

Danse avec les stars
- Season 2
- Celebrity winner: Shy'm
- Professional winner: Maxime Dereymez
- No. of episodes: 7

Release
- Original network: TF1
- Original release: 8 October – 19 November 2011

Season chronology
- ← Previous; Season 1 Next → Season 3

The second season of the French version of Strictly Come Dancing debuted on TF1 on 8 October 2011. Nine celebrities were paired with nine professional ballroom dancers. Sandrine Quétier and Vincent Cerutti return as the hosts for this season. The series was won by Shy'm and Maxime Dereymez.

== Participants ==
Celebrity	Notability (known for)	Professional partner	Status
Cédric Pioline	Retired tennis player	Katrina Patchett	Eliminated 1st on 8 October 2011
Nâdiya	R&B singer	Christophe Licata	Eliminated 2nd on 15 October 2011
Valérie Bègue	Miss France 2008	Grégory Guichard	Eliminated 3rd on 22 October 2011
Véronique Jannot	Actress	Grégoire Lyonnet	Eliminated 4th on 29 October 2011
Francis Lalanne	Singer-songwriter & poet	Silvia Notargiacomo	Eliminated 5th on 5 November 2011
Sheila	Singer & author	Julien Brugel	Eliminated 6th on 12 November 2011
Baptiste Giabiconi	Model & singer	Fauve Hautot	Third Place on November 19, 2011
Philippe Candeloro	Former Olympic figure skater	Candice Pascal	Second Place on November 19, 2011
Shy'm	Singer	Maxime Dereymez	Winners on November 19, 2011

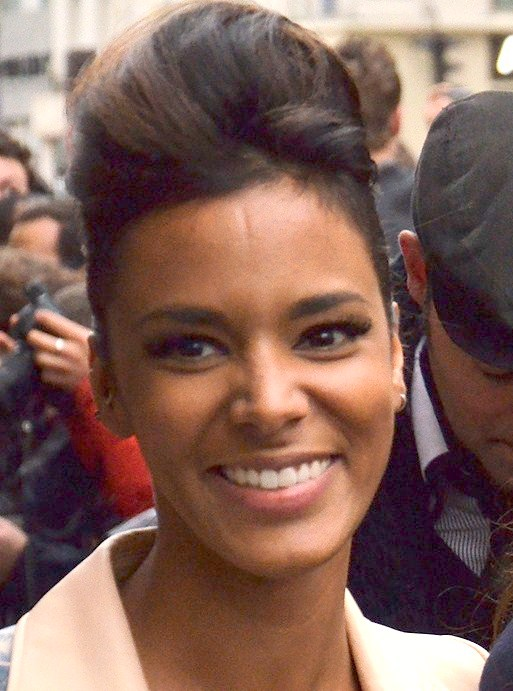
Shy'm

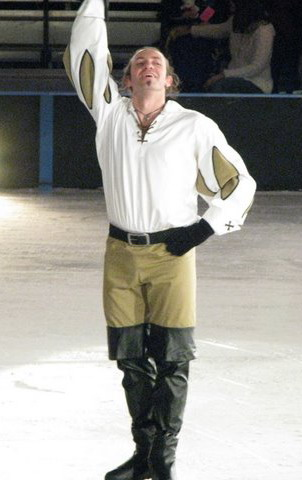
Philippe Candeloro

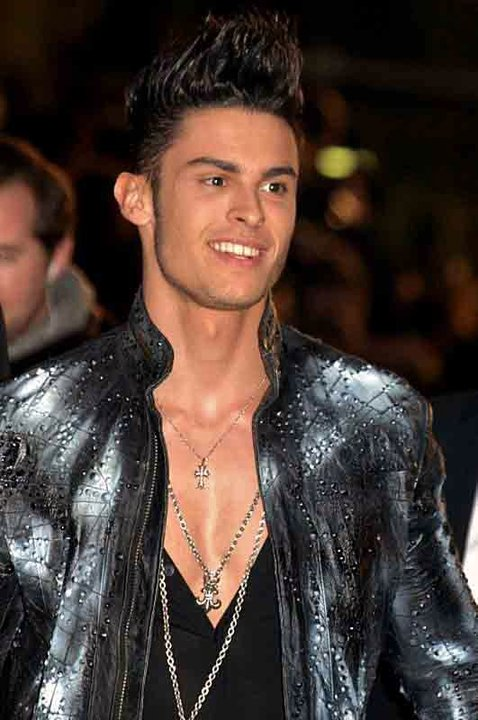
Baptiste Giabiconi

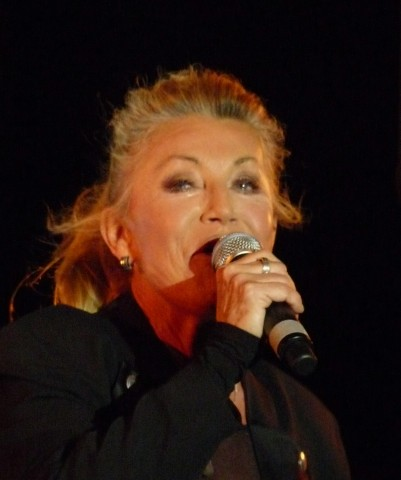
Sheila

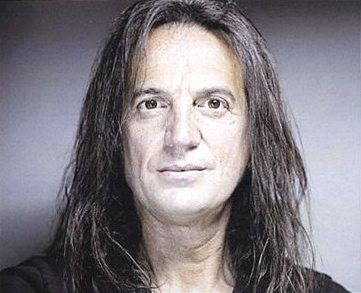
Francis Lalanne
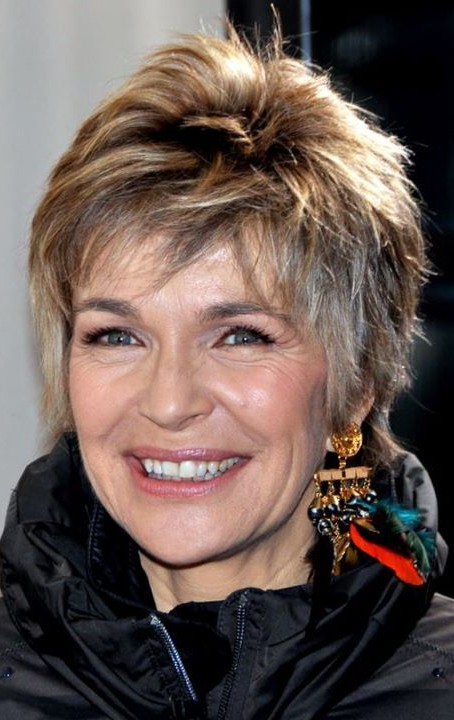
Véronique Jannot

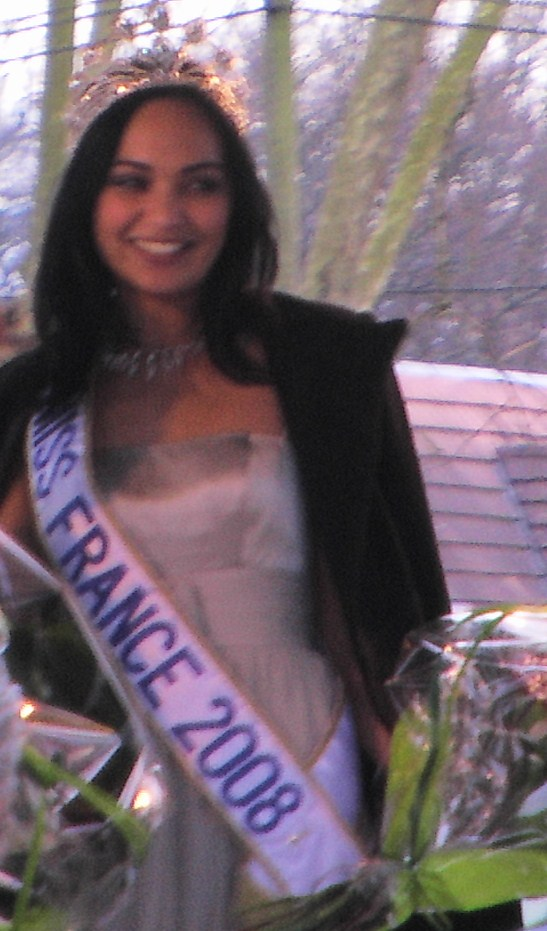
Valérie Bègue

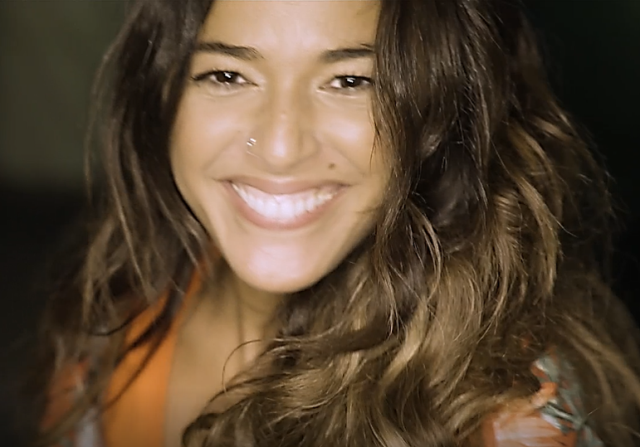
Nâdiya

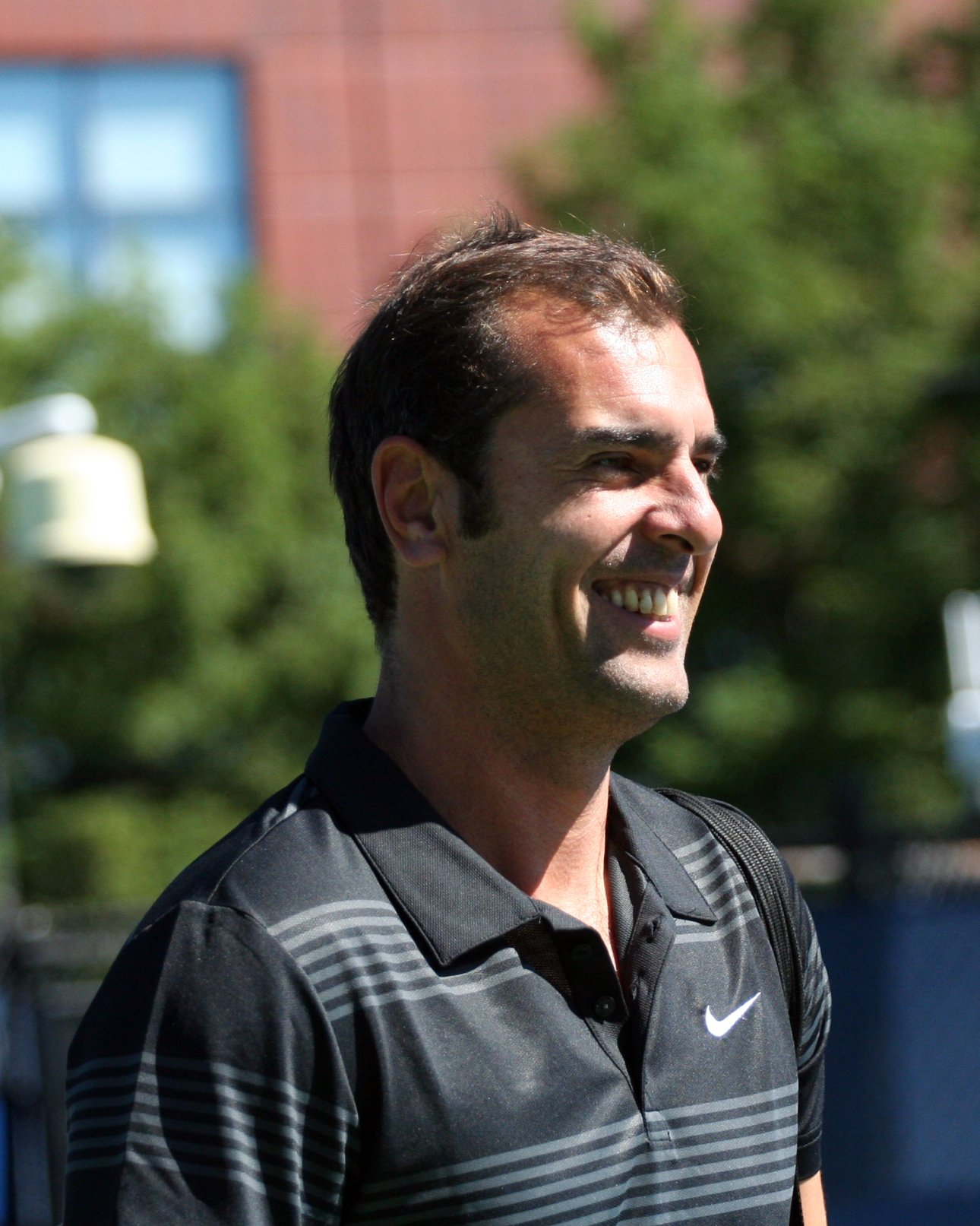
Cédric Pioline

== Scoring ==
Team	Place	1	2	3	4	5	6	7
Shy'm & Maxime	1	22	27	25 + 12 = 37	46 + 54 = 100	52 + 47 = 99	51 + 49 + 30 = 130	54 + 56 = 110
Philippe & Candice	2	19	17	20 + 6 = 26	42 + 32 = 74	39 + 42 = 81	48 + 37 + 40 = 125	52 + 51 = 103
Baptiste & Fauve	3	12	24	24 + 14=38	41 + 51 = 92	49 + 41 = 90	49 + 50 + 20 = 119	49 + 57 = 106
Sheila & Julien	4	15	15	24 + 4 = 28	42 + 43 = 85	31 + 32 = 63	35 + 50 + 10 = 95	
Francis & Silvia	5	17	22	23 + 10 = 33	35 + 51 = 86	43 + 37 = 80		
Véronique & Grégoire	6	15	17	16 + 2 = 18	40 + 39 = 79			
Valérie & Grégory	7	16	23	20 + 8 = 28				
Nâdiya & Christophe	8	17	14					
Cédric & Katrina	9	13						

Red numbers indicate the couples with the lowest score for each week.
Blue numbers indicate the couples with the highest score for each week.
indicates the couples eliminated that week.
indicates the returning couple that finished in the bottom two.
indicates the winning couple.
indicates the runner-up couple.
indicates the third place couple.

=== Notes of each couples ===
Couple	Total	10	9	8	7	6	5	4	3	2	1	Average
Shy'm & Maxime	57	5	28	13	11	—N/a						8.5
Philippe & Candice	57	1	7	19	10	8	9	2	1	—N/a		7
Baptiste & Fauve	57	4	19	15	10	4	3	1	1	—N/a		7.8
Sheila & Julien	45	—N/a	4	7	14	7	5	6	2	—N/a		6.4
Francis & Silvia	33	—N/a	3	9	9	6	6	—N/a				6.9
Véronique & Grégoire	21	—N/a			8	8	3	2	—N/a			6
Valérie & Grégory	9	—N/a		3	2	1	3	—N/a				6.6
Nâdiya & Christophe	6	—N/a				2	3	1	—N/a			5.2
Cédric & Katrina	3	—N/a				1	—N/a	1	1	—N/a		4.3
Total	288	10	61	66	64	37	32	13	5	0	0	7.2

== Averages ==
This table only counts dances scored on the traditional 30-point scale.

Rank by average	Place	Couple	Total	Number of dance	Average
1	1	Shy'm & Maxime	483	11	25.42
2	3	Baptiste & Fauve	447	11	23.53
3	2	Philippe & Candice	399	11	21.00
4	5	Francis & Silvia	228	7	20.73
5	7	Valérie & Grégory	59	3	19.67
6	4	Sheila & Julien	287	9	19.13
7	6	Véronique & Grégoire	127	5	18.14
8	8	Nâdiya & Christophe	31	2	15.50
9	9	Cédric & Katrina	13	1	13.00

== Highest and lowest scoring performances ==
The best and worst performances in each dance according to the judges' marks are as follows (out of 30 except for Jive Marathon & Salsa Marathon):

Dance	Best dancer	Best score	Worst dancer	Worst score
Quickstep	Shy'm	22	Baptiste Giabiconi	12
Cha-Cha-Cha	Baptiste Giabiconi	25	Véronique Jannot	15
Rumba	Baptiste Giabiconi	28.5	Cédric Pioline	13
Tango	Shy'm	27	Sheila	15
Waltz	Valérie Bègue	23	Francis Lalanne	22
Jive	Francis Lalanne	25.5	Nâdiya	14
Foxtrot	Shy'm	28	Véronique Jannot	16
Samba	Shy'm	27	Phillipe Candeloro	16
Paso Doble	Shy'm; Phillipe Candeloro	26	Sheila	15.5
Viennese Waltz	Baptiste Giabiconi	25.5	Sheila	16
Charleston	Baptiste Giabiconi	24.5	Sheila	21

== Couples' Highest and lowest scoring performances ==
According to the traditional 30-point scale.

Couples	Highest Scoring Dances	Lowest Scoring Dances
Shy'm & Maxime	Foxtrot (28)	Quickstep (22)
Philippe & Candice	Paso Doble (26)	Samba (16)
Baptiste & Fauve	Rumba (28.5)	Quickstep (12)
Sheila & Julien	Foxtrot (25)	Quickstep; Tango (15)
Francis & Silvia	Jive (25.5)	Cha-Cha-Cha (17)
Véronique & Grégoire	Rumba (20)	Cha-Cha-Cha (15)
Valérie & Grégory	Waltz (23)	Cha-Cha-Cha (16)
Nâdiya & Christophe	Rumba (17)	Jive (14)
Cédric & Katrina	Rumba (13)	Rumba (13)

== Styles, scores and songs ==
=== Week 1 ===
Individual judges scores in the chart below (given in parentheses) are listed in this order from left to right: Alessandra Martines, Jean-Marc Généreux, Chris Marques.

Couple	Score	Style	Music	Result
Shy'm & Maxime	22 (7,8,7)	Quickstep	Muppet Show Theme	Safe
Francis & Silvia	17 (6,6,5)	Cha-Cha-Cha	"Mercy" – Duffy	Safe
Sheila & Julien	15 (5,5,5)	Quickstep	"C'est Comme Ça" – Les Rita Mitsouko	Safe
Baptiste & Fauve	12 (5,4,3)	Quickstep	"Moi Je Joue" – Brigitte Bardot	Safe
Philippe & Candice	19 (7,6,6)	Cha-Cha-Cha	"Eso Es El Amor" – Darío Moreno	Safe
Nâdiya & Christophe	17 (5,6,6)	Rumba	"Your Song" – Elton John (cover by Amaury Vassili)	Safe
Véronique & Grégoire	15 (5,5,5)	Cha-Cha-Cha	"Firework" – Katy Perry	Safe
Valérie & Grégory	16 (5,6,5)	Cha-Cha-Cha	"Judas" – Lady Gaga	Bottom 2
Cédric & Katrina	13 (6,4,3)	Rumba	"Rolling in the Deep" – Adele	Eliminated
Face To Face
Valérie & Grégory	65%	Cha-Cha-Cha	On the Floor – Jennifer Lopez	Safe
Cédric & Katrina	35%	Cha-Cha-Cha	On the Floor – Jennifer Lopez	Eliminated

=== Week 2 ===
Individual judges scores in the chart below (given in parentheses) are listed in this order from left to right: Alessandra Martines, Jean-Marc Généreux, Chris Marques.

Couple	Score	Style	Music	Result
Sheila & Julien	15 (6,5,4)	Tango	"Rehab" – Amy Winehouse	Safe
Francis & Silvia	22 (8,7,7)	Waltz	"Empire State Of Mind" – Alicia Keys	Safe
Shy'm & Maxime	27 (9,9,9)	Tango	"Perhaps, Perhaps, Perhaps" – The Pussycat Dolls	Safe
Philippe & Candice	17 (5,8,4)	Jive	"Antisocial" – Trust	Bottom 2
Baptiste & Fauve	24 (8,8,8)	Tango	"Sweat"- Snoop Dogg	Safe
Valérie & Grégory	23 (8,7,8)	Waltz	"J'Envoie Valser"- Zazie	Safe
Véronique & Grégoire	17 (6,7,4)	Jive	"L'aventurier"- Indochine	Safe
Nadiya & Christophe	14 (4,5,5)	Jive	"Shake your tailfeather"- The Blues Brothers	Eliminated
Face To Face
Philippe et Candice	66%	Jive	"Tutti Frutti" - Little Richard	Safe
Nâdiya et Christophe	34%	Jive	"Tutti Frutti" - Little Richard	Eliminated

=== Week 3 ===
Individual judges scores in the chart below (given in parentheses) are listed in this order from left to right: Alessandra Martines, Jean-Marc Généreux, Chris Marques.

Theme: 1980s week

Couple	Score	Total	Style	Music	Result
Philippe & Candice	20 (5,8,7)		Foxtrot	"Total Eclipse of the Heart" – Bonnie Tyler	Bottom 2
Valérie & Grégory	20 (8,7,5)		Tango	"Sans contrefaçon" – Mylène Farmer	Eliminated
Sheila & Julien	24 (9,8,7)		Samba	"Conga" – Gloria Estefan	Safe
Baptiste & Fauve	24 (9,7,8)		Paso Doble	"Bad" – Michael Jackson	Safe
Francis & Silvia	23 (7,8,8)		Paso Doble	"Let's Dance" – David Bowie	Safe
Shy'm & Maxime	25 (9,9,7)		Jive	"Maniac" – Michael Sembello	Safe
Véronique & Grégoire	16 (6,6,4)		Foxtrot	"Femme que j'aime" – Jean-Luc Lahaye	Safe
Dance marathon
Baptiste & Fauve	+ 14	38	Jive	"Le Banana Split" - Lio	
Shy'm & Maxime	+ 12	37	Jive	"Le Banana Split" - Lio	
Francis & Silvia	+ 10	33	Jive	"Le Banana Split" - Lio	
Valérie & Grégory	+ 8	28	Jive	"Le Banana Split" - Lio	
Philippe & Candice	+ 6	26	Jive	"Le Banana Split" - Lio	
Sheila & Julien	+ 4	28	Jive	"Le Banana Split" - Lio	
Véronique & Grégoire	+ 2	18	Jive	"Le Banana Split" - Lio	
Face To Face
Philippe & Candice	63%		Paso Doble	The Final Countdown – Europe	Safe
Valérie et Grégory	37%		Paso Doble	The Final Countdown – Europe	Eliminated

=== Week 4 ===
Individual judges scores in the chart below (given in parentheses) are listed in this order from left to right: Alessandra Martines, Jean-Marc Généreux, Chris Marques.

Theme: Cinema & TV series week

Couple	Score artistique	Score technique	Total		Style	Music	Result
Philippe & Candice	23 (7,8,8)	19 (7,7,5)	42	74	Viennese Waltz	Pirates of the Caribbean theme - Hans Zimmer	Bottom 2
Philippe & Candice	17 (6,6,5)	15 (5,5,5)	32	74	Samba	Wonder Woman theme	Bottom 2
Shy'm & Maxime	24 (7,9,8)	22 (8,7,7)	46	100	Rumba	You Can Leave Your Hat On - Joe Cocker (from 9½ Weeks)	Safe
Shy'm & Maxime	27 (9,9,9)	27 (9,9,9)	54	100	Foxtrot	"Fly Me to the Moon" – Frank Sinatra	Safe
Francis & Silvia	19 (6,7,6)	16 (5,6,5)	35	86	Foxtrot	The Pink Panther theme - Henry Mancini	Safe
Francis & Silvia	26 (9,9,8)	25 (9,8,8)	51	86	Jive	Everybody Needs Somebody to Love - The Blues Brothers	Safe
Baptiste & Fauve	23 (8,8,7)	18 (6,6,6)	41	92	Jive	I'll Be There For You - The Rembrandts (from Friends)	Safe
Baptiste & Fauve	27 (9,9,9)	24 (8,8,8)	51	92	Viennese Waltz	Le Fabuleux Destin d'Amélie Poulain theme - Yann Tiersen	Safe
Sheila & Julien	23 (7,8,8)	19 (6,7,6)	42	85	Charleston	Cabaret theme	Safe
Sheila & Julien	22 (7,7,8)	21 (7,7,7)	43	85	Cha-Cha-Cha	Night Fever - Bee Gees (from Saturday Night Fever)	Safe
Véronique & Grégoire	21 (7,7,7)	19 (6,7,6)	40	79	Rumba	Take My Breath Away - Berlin (from Top Gun)	Eliminated
Véronique & Grégoire	21 (7,7,7)	18 (6,6,6)	39	79	Quickstep	Supercalifragilisticexpialidocious (from Mary Poppins)	Eliminated
Face To Face
Philippe et Candice	50,5%				Jive	Happy Days Theme	Safe
Véronique et Grégoire	49,5%				Jive	Happy Days Theme	Eliminated

=== Week 5 ===
Individual judges scores in the chart below (given in parentheses) are listed in this order from left to right: Alessandra Martines, Jean-Marc Généreux, Chris Marques.

Theme: Dance Blind

Couple	Score artistique	Score technique	Total		Style	Music	Result
Philippe & Candice	23 (8,8,7)	16 (6,7,3)	39	81	Rumba	Que je t'aime – Johnny Hallyday	Safe
Philippe & Candice	22 (8,8,6)	20 (7,7,6)	42	81	Tango	Sexy Chick – David Guetta	Safe
Shy'm & Maxime	28 (9,10,9)	24 (8,8,8)	52	99	Paso Doble	España cañí - Pascual Marquina Narro	Safe
Shy'm & Maxime	26 (9,9,8)	21 (7,7,7)	47	99	Viennese Waltz	Stop! – Sam Brown	Safe
Sheila & Julien	19 (6,7,6)	12 (4,5,3)	31	63	Paso Doble	It's Raining Men – The Weather Girls	Safe
Sheila & Julien	21 (7,7,7)	11 (4,4,3)	32	63	Viennese Waltz	Unchained Melody – The Righteous Brothers	Safe
Francis & Silvia	23 (7,8,8)	20 (7,6,7)	43	80	Quickstep	Sing, Sing, Sing – Gene Krupa	Eliminated
Francis & Silvia	22 (8,7,7)	15 (5,5,5)	37	80	Samba	Alexandrie, Alexandra – Claude François	Eliminated
Baptiste & Fauve	27 (9,9,9)	22 (7,8,7)	49	90	Charleston	Benny Hill theme	Bottom 2
Baptiste & Fauve	25 (9,8,8)	16 (5,5,6)	41	90	Rumba	Beautiful – Christina Aguilera	Bottom 2
Face To Face
Baptiste et Fauve	64%				Tango	Jalousie – Alfred Hause	Safe
Francis et Silvia	36%				Tango	Jalousie – Alfred Hause	Eliminated

=== Week 6 ===
Individual judges scores in the chart below (given in parentheses) are listed in this order from left to right: Alessandra Martines, Jean-Marc Généreux, Chris Marques.

Couple	Score artistique	Score technique	Total		Style	Music	Result
Philippe & Candice	24 (8,8,8)	24 (8,8,8)	48	85	Paso Doble	Eye of the Tiger - Survivor	Bottom 2
Philippe & Candice	23 (9,8,6)	14 (5,5,4)	37	85	Quickstep	"I'm So Excited" – The Pointer Sisters	Bottom 2
Shy'm & Maxime	27 (9,9,9)	24 (8,8,8)	51	100	Tango	La cumparsita - Pascual Contursi	Safe
Shy'm & Maxime	27 (9,10,8)	22 (8,7,7)	49	100	Cha-Cha-Cha	"When I Grow Up" – The Pussycat Dolls	Safe
Sheila & Julien	21 (7,8,6)	14 (4,6,4)	35	85	Jive	"L'école est finie" – Sheila	Eliminated
Sheila & Julien	27 (9,9,9)	23 (8,7,8)	50	85	Foxtrot	"I Wanna Be Loved by You" – Marilyn Monroe	Eliminated
Baptiste & Fauve	27 (9,9,9)	22 (8,7,7)	49	99	Foxtrot	"Strangers in the Night" – Frank Sinatra	Safe
Baptiste & Fauve	26 (10,9,7)	24 (9,8,7)	50	99	Cha-Cha-Cha	"Le Temps Qui Court" – Alain Chamfort	Safe
Dance marathon
Philippe & Candice	+ 40		125		Salsa	"Let's Get Loud" - Jennifer Lopez	
Shy'm & Maxime	+ 30		130		Salsa	"Let's Get Loud" - Jennifer Lopez	
Baptiste & Fauve	+ 20		119		Salsa	"Let's Get Loud" - Jennifer Lopez	
Sheila & Julien	+ 10		95		Salsa	"Let's Get Loud" - Jennifer Lopez	
Face To Face
Philippe et Candice	59%				Quickstep	Puttin' On the Ritz – Irving Berlin	Safe
Sheila et Julien	41%				Quickstep	Puttin' On the Ritz – Irving Berlin	Eliminated

=== Week 7 ===
Individual judges scores in the chart below (given in parentheses) are listed in this order from left to right: Alessandra Martines, Jean-Marc Généreux, Chris Marques.

Couple	Score artistique	Score technique	Total		Style	Music	Result
Philippe & Candice	27 (9,9,9)	25 (8,9,8)	52	103	Paso Doble	Indiana Jones theme	2nd Place
Philippe & Candice	28 (9,10,9)	23 (8,8,7)	51	103	Tango	"Money, Money, Money" – ABBA	2nd Place
Shy'm & Maxime	28 (9,10,9)	26 (9,9,8)	54	110	Samba	"Loca" – Shakira	Winner
Shy'm & Maxime	29 (9,10,10)	27 (9,9,9)	56	110	Foxtrot	E.T. the Extra-Terrestrial theme - John Williams	Winner
Baptiste & Fauve	25 (9,9,7)	24 (9,8,7)	49	106	Jive	"Blue Suede Shoes" – Elvis Presley	3rd Place
Baptiste & Fauve	29 (10,10,9)	28 (10,9,9)	57	106	Rumba	James Bond theme	3rd Place
'Freestyle'
Shy'm et Maxime	65%				Freestyle	All by Myself – Céline Dion	
Philippe et Candice	35%				Freestyle	Pas de Boogie Woogie – Eddy Mitchell	

== Call-Out Order ==
The Table Lists in which order the contestants' fates were revealed by Quétier and Cerutti.

Contestant call-out order
Order	1	2	3	4	5	6	7
1	Philippe & Candice; 27%	Shy'm & Maxime; 39%	Baptiste & Fauve; 23%	Shy'm & Maxime; 34%	Sheila & Julien; 56%	Shy'm & Maxime; 39%	Shy'm & Maxime; 46%
2	Nâdiya & Christophe; 19	Francis & Silvia; 15%	Sheila & Julien; 19%	Sheila & Julien; 26%	Baptiste & Fauve; 16%	Baptiste & Fauve; 33%	Philippe & Candice; 35%
3	Baptiste & Fauve; 11%	Baptiste & Fauve; 11%	Shy'm & Maxime; 17%	Baptiste & Fauve; 17%	Shy'm & Maxime; 13%	Philippe & Candice; 20%	Baptiste & Fauve; 19%
4	Sheila & Julien; 10%	Véronique & Grégoire; 10%	Francis & Silvia; 13%	Francis & Silvia; 12%	Philippe & Candice; 10%	Sheila & Julien; 8%	
5	Shy'm & Maxime; 8%	Valérie & Grégory; 7%	Véronique & Grégoire; 12%	Philippe & Candice; 8%	Francis & Silvia; 5%		
6	Francis & Silvia; 8%	Sheila & Julien; 6%	Philippe & Candice; 9%	Véronique & Grégoire; 3%			
7	Véronique & Grégoire; 8%	Philippe & Candice; 5%	Valérie & Grégory; 7%				
8	Valérie & Grégory; 6%	Nâdiya & Christophe; 4%					
9	Cédric & Katrina; 3%						

This couple came in first place with the judges.
This couple came in last place with the judges.
This couple came in last place with the judges and was eliminated.
This couple was eliminated.
This couple won the competition.
This couple came in second in the competition.
This couple came in third in the competition.

== Dance schedule ==
The celebrities and professional partners danced one of these routines for each corresponding week.

- Week 1 : Cha-Cha-Cha, Quickstep or Rumba
- Week 2 : Jive, Tango or Waltz
- Week 3 : Samba, Jive, Foxtrot, Paso Doble or Tango (1980s Theme)
- Week 4 : Jive, Foxtrot, Viennese Waltz, Charleston, Rumba, Samba, Cha-Cha-Cha or Quickstep (Cinema & TV series Theme)
- Week 5 : Charleston, Rumba, Tango, Paso Doble, Viennese Waltz, Quickstep or Samba
- Week 6 : Foxtrot, Cha-Cha-Cha, Quickstep, Tango, Jive or Paso Doble and Salsa Marathon (semi-finale)
- Week 7 : Paso Doble, Tango, Samba, Foxtrot, Jive or Rumba and Freestyle (finale)

== Dance Chart ==
Couple	1	2	3		4		5		6			7		
Shy'm & Maxime	Quickstep	Tango	Jive	Jive Marathon	Rumba	Foxtrot	Paso Doble	Viennese Waltz	Tango	Cha-Cha-Cha	Salsa Marathon	Samba	Foxtrot	Freestyle
Philippe & Candice	Cha-Cha-Cha	Jive	Foxtrot	Jive Marathon	Viennese Waltz	Samba	Rumba	Tango	Paso Doble	Quickstep	Salsa Marathon	Paso Doble	Tango	Freestyle
Baptiste & Fauve	Quickstep	Tango	Paso Doble	Jive Marathon	Jive	Viennese Waltz	Charleston	Rumba	Foxtrot	Cha-Cha-Cha	Salsa Marathon	Jive	Rumba	
Sheila & Julien	Quickstep	Tango	Samba	Jive Marathon	Charleston	Cha-Cha-Cha	Paso Doble	Viennese Waltz	Jive	Foxtrot	Salsa Marathon			
Francis & Silvia	Cha Cha Cha	Waltz	Paso Doble	Jive Marathon	Foxtrot	Jive	Quickstep	Samba						
Véronique & Grégoire	Cha-Cha-Cha	Jive	Foxtrot	Jive Marathon	Rumba	Quickstep								
Valérie & Grégory	Cha-Cha-Cha	Waltz	Tango	Jive Marathon										
Nâdiya & Christophe	Rumba	Jive												
Cédric & Katrina	Rumba													

Highest scoring dance
Lowest scoring dance
Danced, but not scored

== Musical Guests ==
Date	Performers	Tracks Performed	Dancers
8 October 2011	Amaury Vassili	"I hope you don't mind"	Nâdiya & Christophe Licata (contestants)
15 October 2011	None	None	None
22 October 2011	None	None	None
29 October 2011	None	None	None
5 November 2011	None	None	None
12 November 2011	Troupe Dracula	"1, 2, 3" & "Éteins la lumière"	All the Dancers
19 November 2011	1789 : Les Amants de la Bastille	"Ça ira mon amour"	The 1789's Dancers

== Ratings ==
- Week 1 Performance Show & Results Show : 5 318 000 viewers (26,1%)
- Week 2 Performance Show & Results Show : 4 441 000 viewers (21,8%)
- Week 3 Performance Show & Results Show : 4 779 000 viewers (22,9%)
- Week 4 Performance Show & Results Show : 4 909 000 viewers (25,3%)
- Week 5 Performance Show & Results Show : 4 949 000 viewers (22,9%)
- Week 6 Performance Show & Results Show : 5 071 000 viewers (25%)
- Week 7 Performance Show & Results Show : 5 335 000 viewers (25,3%)
