= Danse avec les stars season 1 =

Danse avec les stars
- Season 1
- Celebrity winner: Matt Pokora
- Professional winner: Katrina Patchett
- No. of episodes: 6

Release
- Original network: TF1
- Original release: February 12 – March 19, 2011

Season chronology
- Next → Season 2

The first season of the French version of Strictly Come Dancing debuted on TF1 on February 12, 2011. Eight celebrities were paired with eight professional ballroom dancers. Sandrine Quétier and Vincent Cerutti were the hosts for this season.

The winners were Matt Pokora and Katrina Patchett.

== Participants ==
Celebrity	Notability (known for)	Professional partner	Status
André Manoukian	Musician, songwriter, & actor	Candice Pascal	Eliminated 1st on February 12, 2011
Rossy de Palma	Actress & model	Christophe Licata	Eliminated 2nd on February 19, 2011
Marthe Mercadier†	Actress	Grégoire Lyonnet	Eliminated 3rd on February 26, 2011
Jean-Marie Bigard	Comedian	Fauve Hautot	Eliminated 4th on March 5, 2011
Adriana Karembeu	Fashion model & actress	Julien Brugel	Eliminated 5th on March 12, 2011
David Ginola	Former international footballer	Silvia Notargiacomo	Third Place on March 19, 2011
Sofia Essaidi	Singer & actress	Maxime Dereymez	Second Place on March 19, 2011
M. Pokora	Singer-songwriter	Katrina Patchett	Winners on March 19, 2011

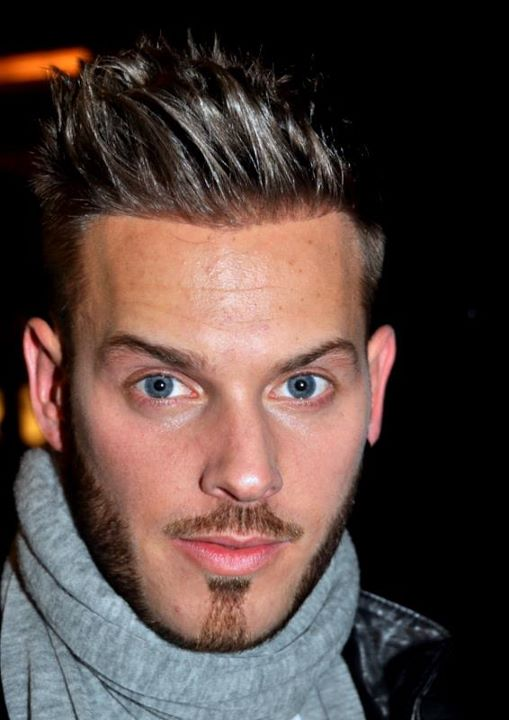
M. Pokora

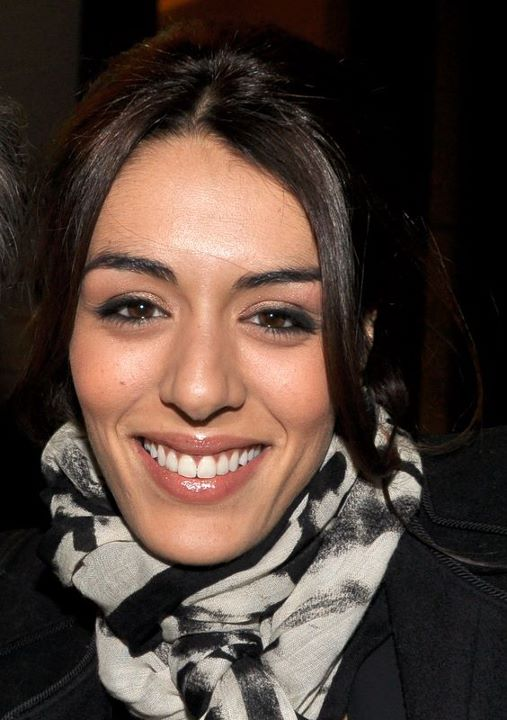
Sofia Essaïdi

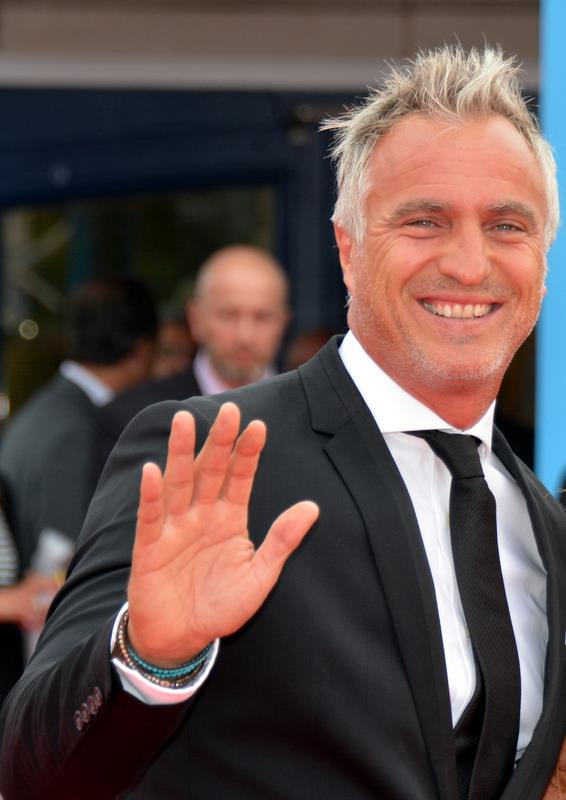
David Ginola

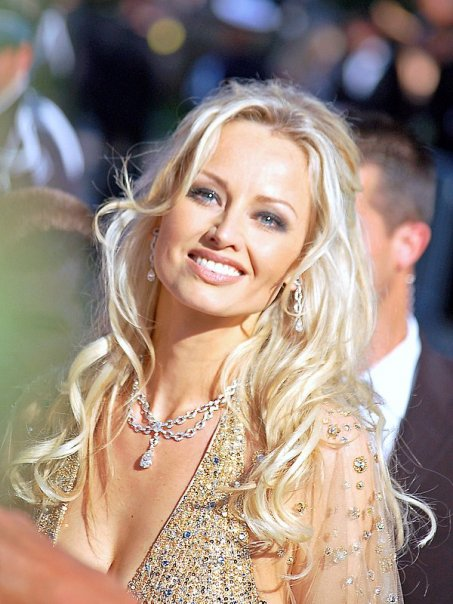
Adriana Karembeu
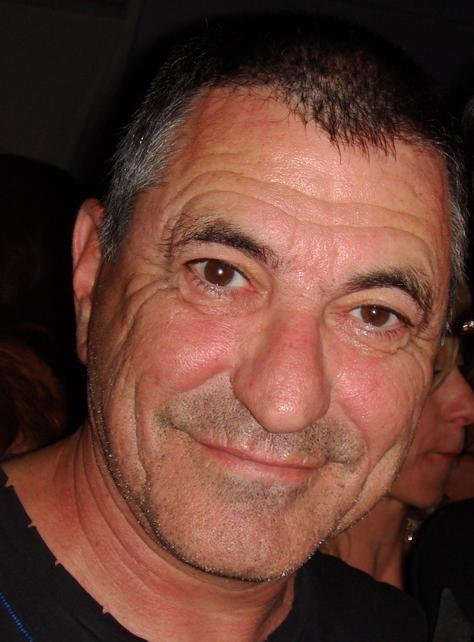
Jean-Marie Bigard

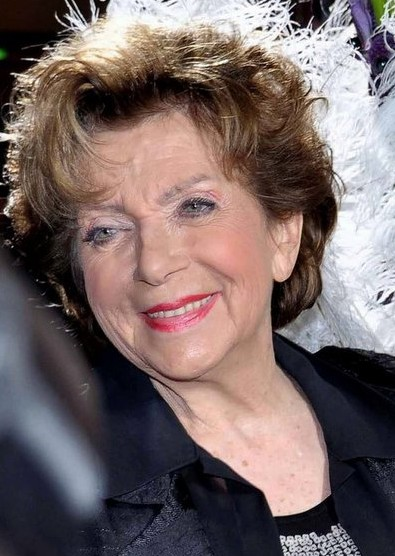
Marthe Mercadier

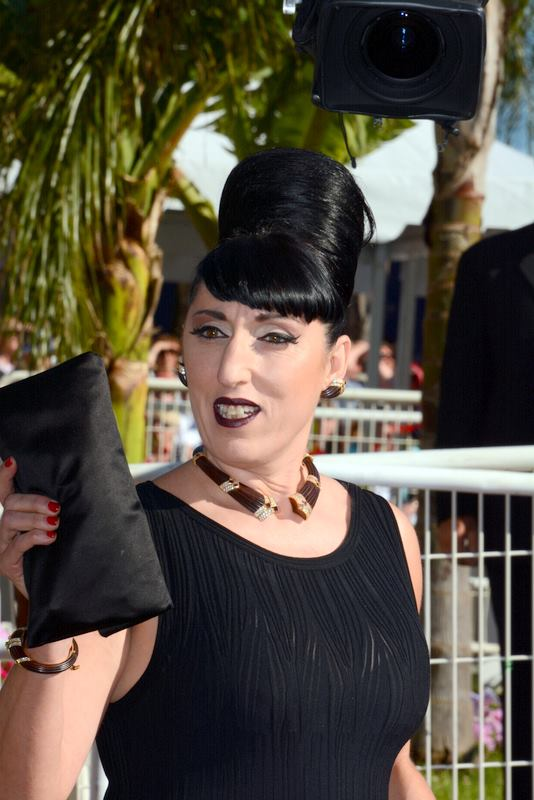
Rossy de Palma

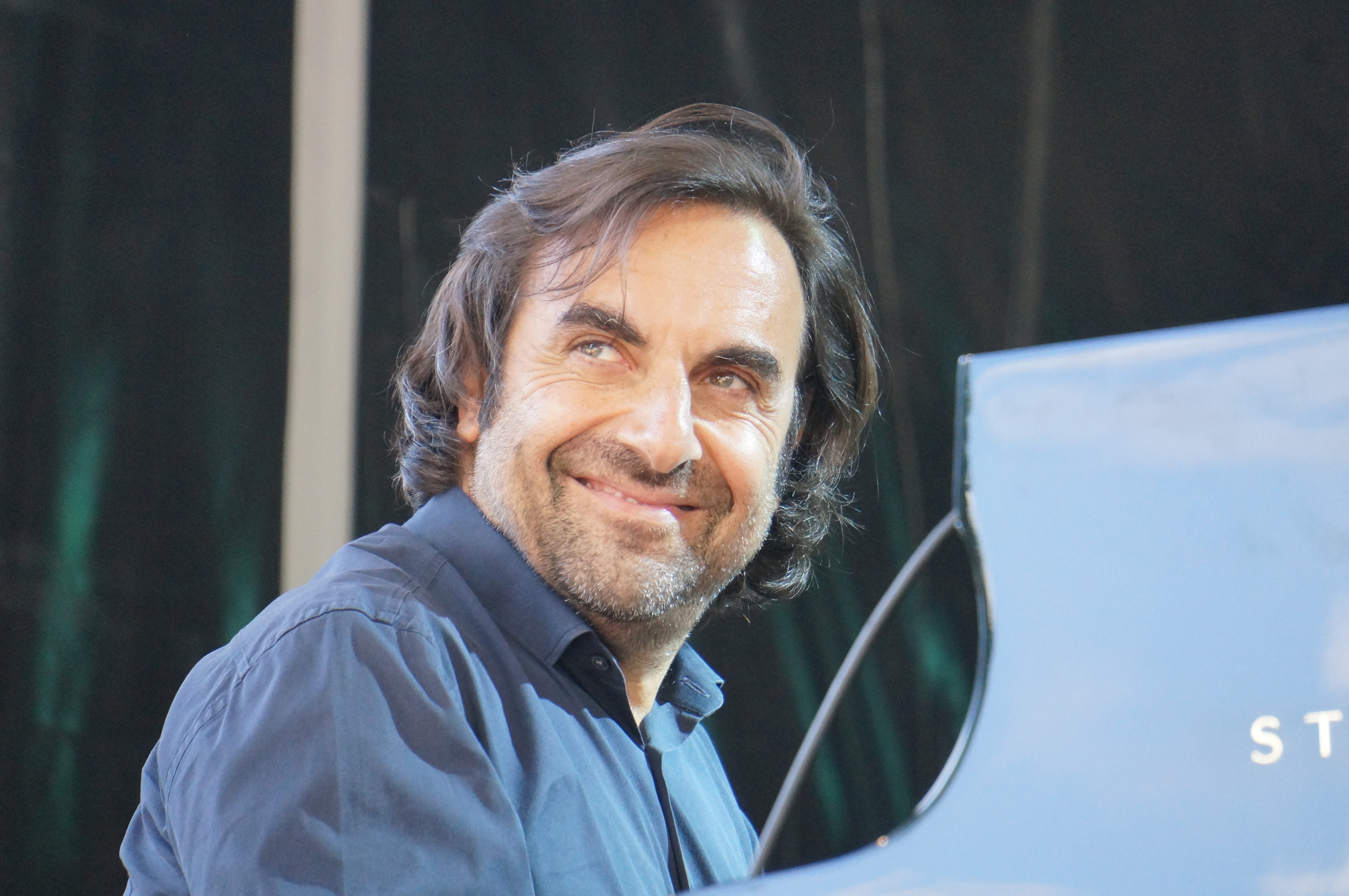
André Manoukian

== Scoring ==
Team	Place	1	2	3	4	5	6
M. Pokora & Katrina	1	23	25	24 + 8 = 32	27 + 27 = 54	55 + 52 + 30 = 137	57 + 57 = 114
Sofia & Maxime	2	25	24	27 + 6 = 33	28 + 29 = 57	47 + 48 + 40 = 135	55 + 59 = 114
David & Silvia	3	22	25	23 + 7 = 30	19 + 25 = 44	33 + 42 + 10 = 85	38 + 42 = 80
Adriana & Julien	4	17	23	19 + 5 = 24	20 + 21 = 41	28 + 29 + 20 = 77	
Jean-Marie & Fauve	5	19	15	15 + 4 = 19	21 + 18 = 39		
Marthe & Grégoire	6	18	11	15 + 3 = 18			
Rossy & Christophe	7	22	17				
André & Candice	8	15					

Red numbers indicate the couples with the lowest score for each week.
Blue numbers indicate the couples with the highest score for each week.
indicates the couples eliminated that week.
indicates the returning couple that finished in the bottom two.
indicates the winning couple.
indicates the runner-up couple.
indicates the third place couple.

=== Notes of each couples ===
Couple	Total	10	9	8	7	6	5	4	3	2	1	Average
Matt & Katrina	39	12	13	12	2	—N/a						8.9
Sofia & Maxime	39	10	15	11	2	—N/a	1	—N/a				8.8
David & Silvia	39	—N/a	4	8	13	10	2	2	—N/a			6.9
Adriana & Julien	27	—N/a		3	8	6	4	3	3	—N/a		5.8
Jean-Marie & Fauve	15	—N/a			4	6	4	1	—N/a			5.9
Marthe & Grégoire	9	—N/a		1	—N/a	3	1	2	1	1	—N/a	4.9
Rossy & Christophe	6	—N/a		1	2	2	1	—N/a				6.5
André & Candice	3	—N/a				1	1	1	—N/a			5
Total	177	22	32	36	31	28	14	9	4	1	0	7.4

== Averages ==
This table only counts dances scored on the traditional 30-point scale.

Rank by average	Place	Couple	Total	Number of dances	Average
1	1	M. Pokora & Katrina	347	9	26.69
2	2	Sofia & Maxime	342	9	26.31
3	3	David & Silvia	269	9	20.69
4	7	Rossy & Christophe	39	2	19.50
5	5	Jean-Marie & Fauve	88	5	17.60
6	4	Adriana & Julien	157	7	17.44
7	8	André & Candice	15	1	15.00
8	6	Marthe & Grégoire	44	3	14.67

== Highest and lowest scoring performances ==
The best and worst performances in each dance according to the judges' marks are as follows (out of 30, except for Cha-Cha-Cha Marathon and Samba Marathon):

Dance	Best dancer	Best score	Worst dancer	Worst score
Waltz	David Ginola; Jean-Marie Bigard	19	David Ginola; Jean-Marie Bigard	19
Quickstep	Sofia Essaidi	27.5	David Ginola	19
Cha-Cha-Cha	David Ginola; Rossy de Palma	22	André Manoukian	15
Jive	M. Pokora	27	Marthe Mercadier	11
Rumba	Sofia Essaidi	29.5	Jean-Marie Bigard	15
Tango	Sofia Essaidi	28	Adriana Karembeu	14.5
Paso Doble	M. Pokora	28.5	Jean-Marie Bigard	15
Foxtrot	M. Pokora	28.5	Marthe Mercadier	15
Samba	David Ginola	25	Jean-Marie Bigard	18
Viennese Waltz	M. Pokora	27	Sofia Essaïdi	23.5
Charleston	M. Pokora	27.5	M. Pokora	27.5
Salsa	Sofia Essaidi	24	Sofia Essaidi	24

== Couples' Highest and lowest scoring performances ==
According to the traditional 30-point scale.

Couples	Highest Scoring Dances	Lowest Scoring Dances
M. Pokora & Katrina	Paso Doble; Foxtrot (28.5)	Quickstep (23)
Sofia & Maxime	Rumba (29.5)	Viennese Waltz (23.5)
David & Silvia	Jive; Samba (25)	Tango (16.5)
Adriana & Julien	Rumba (23)	Jive (14)
Jean-Marie & Fauve	Tango (21)	Rumba; Paso Doble (15)
Marthe & Grégoire	Cha-Cha-Cha (18)	Jive (11)
Rossy & Christophe	Cha-Cha-Cha (22)	Tango (17)
André & Candice	Cha-Cha-Cha (15)	Cha-Cha-Cha (15)

== Styles, scores and songs ==
=== Week 1 ===
Individual judges scores in the chart below (given in parentheses) are listed in this order from left to right: Alessandra Martines, Jean-Marc Généreux, Chris Marques.

Running order

Couple	Score	Style	Music	Result
Jean-Marie & Fauve	19 (6,6,7)	Waltz	"Cry Me a River"—Michael Bublé	Safe
M. Pokora & Katrina	23 (8,8,7)	Quickstep	"We No Speak Americano"—Yolanda Be Cool & DCUP	Safe
Marthe & Grégoire	18 (6,6,6)	Cha-Cha-Cha	"Bad Romance"—Lady Gaga	Safe
Adriana & Julien	17 (6,5,6)	Cha-Cha-Cha	"La Foule"—Edith Piaf	Safe
David & Silvia	22 (7,7,8)	Cha-Cha-Cha	"Waka Waka (This Time for Africa)"—Shakira	Bottom 2
André & Candice	15 (4,5,6)	Cha-Cha-Cha	"Let's All Chant"—Michael Zager Band	Eliminated
Sofia & Maxime	25 (8,9,8)	Quickstep	"Anything Goes"—Cole Porter	Safe
Rossy & Christophe	22 (8,7,7)	Cha-Cha-Cha	"Marcia Baila"-Les Rita Mitsouko	Safe
Face To Face
David & Silvia	72%	Cha-Cha-Cha	"Kiss"—Prince	Safe
André & Candice	28%	Cha-Cha-Cha	"Kiss"—Prince	Eliminated

=== Week 2 ===
Individual judges scores in the chart below (given in parentheses) are listed in this order from left to right: Alessandra Martines, Jean-Marc Généreux, Chris Marques.

Running order

Couple	Score	Style	Music	Result
Sofia & Maxime	24 (8,8,8)	Jive	"Great Balls Of Fire"—Jerry Lee Lewis	Safe
Jean-Marie & Fauve	15 (5,6,4)	Rumba	"(I've Had) The Time of My Life"—from Dirty Dancing	Safe
Rossy & Christophe	17 (6,5,6)	Tango	"Toxic"—Britney Spears	Eliminated
David & Silvia	25 (9,8,8)	Jive	"Gabrielle"—Johnny Hallyday	Safe
M. Pokora & Katrina	25 (8,9,8)	Tango	"El Tango De Roxanne"—Ewan McGregor & José Feliciano	Safe
Marthe & Grégoire	11 (4,5,2)	Jive	"Just Because Of You"—from Les Bronzés font du ski	Bottom 2
Adriana & Julien	23 (8,8,7)	Rumba	"Umbrella"—Rihanna	Safe
Face To Face
Marthe & Grégoire	50,3%	Jive	Objection (Tango) - Shakira	Safe
Rossy & Christophe	49,7%	Tango	Objection (Tango) - Shakira	Eliminated

=== Week 3 ===
Individual judges scores in the chart below (given in parentheses) are listed in this order from left to right: Alessandra Martines, Jean-Marc Généreux, Chris Marques.

Theme: Movie night – each couple's dance is to an iconic song from the movies.

Running order

Couple	Score	Total	Style	Music	Result
Jean-Marie & Fauve	15 (5,5,5)		Paso Doble	"James Bond Theme" – Monty Norman (from James Bond)	Safe
Sofia & Maxime	27 (9,10,8)		Foxtrot	"Singin' in the Rain" – Gene Kelly (from Singin' in the Rain)	Safe
David & Silvia	23 (8,8,7)		Paso Doble	"Oh, Pretty Woman" – Roy Orbison (from Pretty Woman)	Bottom 2
Adriana & Julien	19 (7,5,7)		Paso Doble	"Don't Let Me Be Misunderstood" – Santa Esmeralda (from Kill Bill)	Safe
M. Pokora & Katrina	24 (9,8,7)		Foxtrot	"Charlie's Angels Theme" – The Hit Crew (from Charlie's Angels)	Safe
Marthe & Grégoire	15 (8,4,3)		Foxtrot	"My Heart Will Go On" – Celine Dion (from Titanic)	Eliminated
Dance marathon
Matt & Katrina	+ 8	32	Samba	"You Should Be Dancing" – Bee Gees (from Saturday Night Fever)	
David & Silvia	+ 7	30	Samba	"You Should Be Dancing" – Bee Gees (from Saturday Night Fever)	
Sofia & Maxime	+ 6	33	Samba	"You Should Be Dancing" – Bee Gees (from Saturday Night Fever)	
Adriana & Julien	+ 5	24	Samba	"You Should Be Dancing" – Bee Gees (from Saturday Night Fever)	
Jean-Marie & Fauve	+ 4	19	Samba	"You Should Be Dancing" – Bee Gees (from Saturday Night Fever)	
Marthe & Grégoire	+ 3	18	Samba	"You Should Be Dancing" – Bee Gees (from Saturday Night Fever)	
Face To Face
David & Silvia	83%		Samba	I Like to Move It - Reel 2 Real ft. The Mad Stuntman - (from Madagascar	Safe
Marthe & Grégoire	17%		Samba	I Like to Move It - Reel 2 Real ft. The Mad Stuntman - (from Madagascar	Eliminated

=== Week 4 ===
Individual judges scores in the chart below (given in parentheses) are listed in this order from left to right: Alessandra Martines, Jean-Marc Généreux, Chris Marques.

Running order

Couple	Score	Total	Style	Music	Result
M. Pokora & Katrina	27 (9,10,8)	54	Jive	"Jailhouse Rock" – Elvis Presley	Safe
M. Pokora & Katrina	27 (9,10,8)	54	Viennese Waltz	"If I Ain't Got You" – Alicia Keys	Safe
Jean-Marie & Fauve	21 (7,7,7)	39	Tango	"Por una Cabeza" – The Tango Project	Eliminated
Jean-Marie & Fauve	18 (6,6,6)	39	Samba	"María" – Ricky Martin	Eliminated
Adriana & Julien	20 (6,8,6)	41	Samba	"Loca" – Shakira	Bottom 2
Adriana & Julien	21 (7,7,7)	41	Quickstep	"Bewitched Theme"—The Hit Crew	Bottom 2
David & Silvia	19 (7,6,6)	44	Quickstep	"Hot Honey Rag" – from Chicago	Safe
David & Silvia	25 (9,8,8)	44	Samba	"Crazy in Love" – Beyoncé	Safe
Sofia & Maxime	28 (9,10,9)	57	Tango	"I Kissed a Girl" – Katy Perry	Safe
Sofia & Maxime	29 (10,10,9)	57	Rumba	"Comme d'habitude" – Claude François	Safe
Face To Face
Adriana & Julien	54%		Jive	Ça (c'est vraiment toi) - Téléphone	Safe
Jean-Marie & Fauve	46%		Jive	Ça (c'est vraiment toi) - Téléphone	Eliminated

=== Week 5 ===
Individual judges scores in the chart below (given in parentheses) are listed in this order from left to right: Alessandra Martines, Jean-Marc Généreux, Chris Marques.

Running order

Couple	Artistic Score	Technical Score	Total		Style	Music	Result
Sofia & Maxime	23 (5,9,9)	24 (8,8,8)	47	95	Viennese Waltz	"Hedwig's Theme" – from Harry Potter	Safe
Sofia & Maxime	25 (9,9,7)	23 (8,8,7)	48	95	Salsa	"Mambo No. 5" – Perez Prado	Safe
David & Silvia	17 (6,5,6)	16 (6,6,4)	33	75	Tango	"Poker Face" – Lady Gaga	Bottom 2
David & Silvia	25 (9,9,7)	17 (7,6,4)	42	75	Rumba	"Endless Love" – Lionel Richie & Diana Ross	Bottom 2
Adriana & Julien	16 (7,6,3)	12 (5,4,3)	28	57	Jive	"J'irai où tu iras" – Céline Dion & Jean-Jacques Goldman	Eliminated
Adriana & Julien	17 (6,7,4)	12 (4,5,3)	29	57	Tango	"Libertango" – Ástor Piazzolla	Eliminated
M. Pokora & Katrina	29 (10,10,9)	26 (9,9,8)	55	107	Charleston	"Charleston" – Green Hill Instrumental	Safe
M. Pokora & Katrina	28 (9,10,9)	24 (8,8,8)	52	107	Rumba	"Angels" – Robbie Williams	Safe
Dance marathon
Sofia & Maxime	+ 40		135		Cha-Cha-Cha	"I Will Survive" – Gloria Gaynor	
Matt & Katrina	+ 30		137		Cha-Cha-Cha	"I Will Survive" – Gloria Gaynor	
Adriana & Julien	+ 20		77		Cha-Cha-Cha	"I Will Survive" – Gloria Gaynor	
David & Silvia	+ 10		85		Cha-Cha-Cha	"I Will Survive" – Gloria Gaynor	
Face To Face
David & Silvia	68%				Cha-Cha-Cha	Beggin' - Madcon	Safe
Adriana & Julien	32%				Cha-Cha-Cha	Beggin' - Madcon	Eliminated

=== Week 6 ===
Individual judges scores in the chart below (given in parentheses) are listed in this order from left to right: Alessandra Martines, Jean-Marc Généreux, Chris Marques.

Running order

Couple	Artistic Score	Technical Score	Total		Style	Music	Result
Sofia & Maxime	28 (9,10,9)	27 (9,9,9)	55	114	Quickstep	"Diamonds Are a Girl's Best Friend" – Marilyn Monroe	2nd Place
Sofia & Maxime	30 (10,10,10)	29 (10,9,10)	59	114	Rumba	"Calling You" – Jevetta Steele	2nd Place
David & Silvia	21 (7,7,7)	17 (6,5,6)	38	80	Waltz	"We Are the Champions" – Queen	3rd Place
David & Silvia	22 (7,8,7)	20 (7,7,6)	42	80	Jive	"Pump It" – The Black Eyed Peas	3rd Place
M. Pokora & Katrina	29 (10,10,9)	28 (10,9,9)	57	114	Paso Doble	"Thriller" – Michael Jackson	Winner
M. Pokora & Katrina	30 (10,10,10)	27 (10,9,8)	57	114	Foxtrot	"New York, New York" – Frank Sinatra	Winner
'Freestyle'
M. Pokora & Katrina	62%				Freestyle	You're the One That I Want (Grease) - John Travolta & Olivia Newton-John	
Sofia & Maxime	38%				Freestyle	Last Dance - Donna Summer	

== Call-Out Order ==
The Table Lists in which order the contestants' fates were revealed by Quétier and Cerutti.

Couple in the order they were announced
Ordre	1	2	3	4	5	6
1	Adriana & Julien	Sofia & Maxime	Sofia & Maxime	M. Pokora & Katrina	M. Pokora & Katrina	M. Pokora & Katrina
2	M. Pokora & Katrina	Rossy & Christophe	M. Pokora & Katrina	Jean-Marie & Fauve	Adriana & Julien	Sofia & Maxime
3	David & Silvia	M. Pokora & Katrina	David & Silvia	Sofia & Maxime	Sofia & Maxime	David & Silvia
4	Jean-Marie & Fauve	Jean-Marie & Fauve	Adriana & Julien	David & Silvia	David & Silvia	
5	Marthe & Grégoire	David & Silvia	Jean-Marie & Fauve	Adriana & Julien		
6	Sofia & Maxime	Adriana & Julien	Marthe & Grégoire			
7	Rossy & Christophe	Marthe & Grégoire				
8	André & Candice					

The couple who got the best score from the judges.
The couple who got the worst score from the judges but they're saved.
The couple were in danger but the're saved.
The couple who was eliminated.
The winner couple.
The couple who finished second in the competition.
The couple who finished third in the competition.

== Dance schedule ==
The celebrities and professional partners danced one of these routines for each corresponding week.

- Week 1: Cha-Cha-Cha, Quickstep or Waltz
- Week 2: Tango, Rumba or Jive
- Week 3: Paso Doble or Foxtrot and Samba marathon (Cinema Theme)
- Week 4: Two unlearned dances from Weeks 1-3 or Viennese Waltz
- Week 5: Two unlearned dances from Weeks 1-3 or Charleston or Salsa and Cha-Cha-Cha marathon (Retro Theme & Double Score Showdown)
- Week 6: One unlearned dance and one repeated dance (David & Silvia and Matt & Katrina) or two repeated dances (Sofia & Maxime) and Freestyle

== Dance Chart ==
Couple	1	2	3		4		5			6		
M. Pokora & Katrina	Quickstep	Tango	Foxtrot	Samba Marathon	Jive	Viennese Waltz	Charleston	Rumba	Cha-Cha-Cha Marathon	Paso Doble	Foxtrot	Freestyle
Sofia & Maxime	Quickstep	Jive	Foxtrot	Samba Marathon	Tango	Rumba	Viennese Waltz	Salsa	Cha-Cha-Cha Marathon	Quickstep	Rumba	Freestyle
David & Silvia	Cha-Cha-Cha	Jive	Paso Doble	Samba Marathon	Quickstep	Samba	Tango	Rumba	Cha-Cha-Cha Marathon	Waltz	Jive	
Adriana & Julien	Cha-Cha-Cha	Rumba	Paso Doble	Samba Marathon	Samba	Quickstep	Jive	Tango	Cha-Cha-Cha Marathon			
Jean-Marie & Fauve	Waltz	Rumba	Paso Doble	Samba Marathon	Tango	Samba						
Marthe & Grégoire	Cha-Cha-Cha	Jive	Foxtrot	Samba Marathon								
Rossy & Christophe	Cha-Cha-Cha	Tango										
André & Candice	Cha-Cha-Cha											

Highest scoring dance
Lowest scoring dance
Danced, but not scored

== Musical Guests ==
Date	Performers	Tracks Performed	Dancers
February 12, 2011	Grégoire	"Danse"	Maxime Dereymez & Katrina Patchett
February 12, 2011	Grégoire	"Soleil"	None
February 19, 2011	Take That	"The Flood"	None
February 26, 2011	Jenifer	"Je Danse"	Jenifer's dancers
March 5, 2011	Florent Pagny	"8ème Merveille	All the dancers
March 5, 2011	James Blunt	"So Far Gone"	Candice Pascal & Grégoire Lyonnet
March 12, 2011	Mozart l'opéra rock	"L'assasymphonie"	Fauve Hautot, Christophe Licata, Candice Pascal & Grégoire Lyonnet
March 12, 2011	Mozart l'opéra rock	"Cest bientôt la fin"	Fauve Hautot, Christophe Licata, Candice Pascal & Grégoire Lyonnet
March 19, 2011	Nicole Scherzinger	"Don't Hold your Breath"	Fauve Hautot, Christophe Licata, Candice Pascal, Grégoire Lyonnet & Julien Brugel

== Ratings ==
- Week 1 Performance Show & Results Show: 4 840 000 viewers (23,9%)
- Week 2 Performance Show & Results Show: 5 034 000 viewers (24,5%)
- Week 3 Performance Show & Results Show: 5 385 000 viewers (25,6%)
- Week 4 Performance Show & Results Show: 4 805 000 viewers (23.5%)
- Week 5 Performance Show & Results Show: 5 115 000 viewers (24.7%)
- Week 6 (The Finale) Performance Show & Results Show: 4 960 000 viewers (24.8%)

== Around the Show ==
- André Manoukian had been a judge on the show Nouvelle Star, like Sinclair (season 8) and Lio (season 9). Amel Bent (season 3) was a contestant on Nouvelle Star in 2004.
