= Sami El Gueddari =

French swimmer

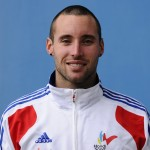

Personal information
- Nationality: French
- Born: February 1, 1984 (age 42) Orléans, France

Sport
- Sport: Swimming
- Classifications: S9
Medal record
Paralympic swimming
Representing France
European Championships
Bronze medal – third place	2009 Reykjavik	50m freestyle S9

Sami El Gueddari (born 1 February 1984) is a French wheelchair racer and competitive swimmer who participated in the Paralympic Games of 2008 and 2012. He was a bronze medalist at the 2009 IPC Swimming European Championships. He is a specialist of 50 meter and 100-meter freestyle.

== Biography ==
Sami El Gueddari has congenital agenesis in the left leg, which stops at the tibia. Retired since 2013, he is now sporting director of the swimming disability program within the French Federation Handisport.

In 2019, he was a contestant in the tenth season of French version of Dancing with the Stars with partner Fauve Hautot. They won the competition, receiving 62% of the votes.

== See also ==
- France at the 2008 Summer Paralympics
- France at the 2012 Summer Paralympics
