= Candice Pascal =

French dancer (born 1984)

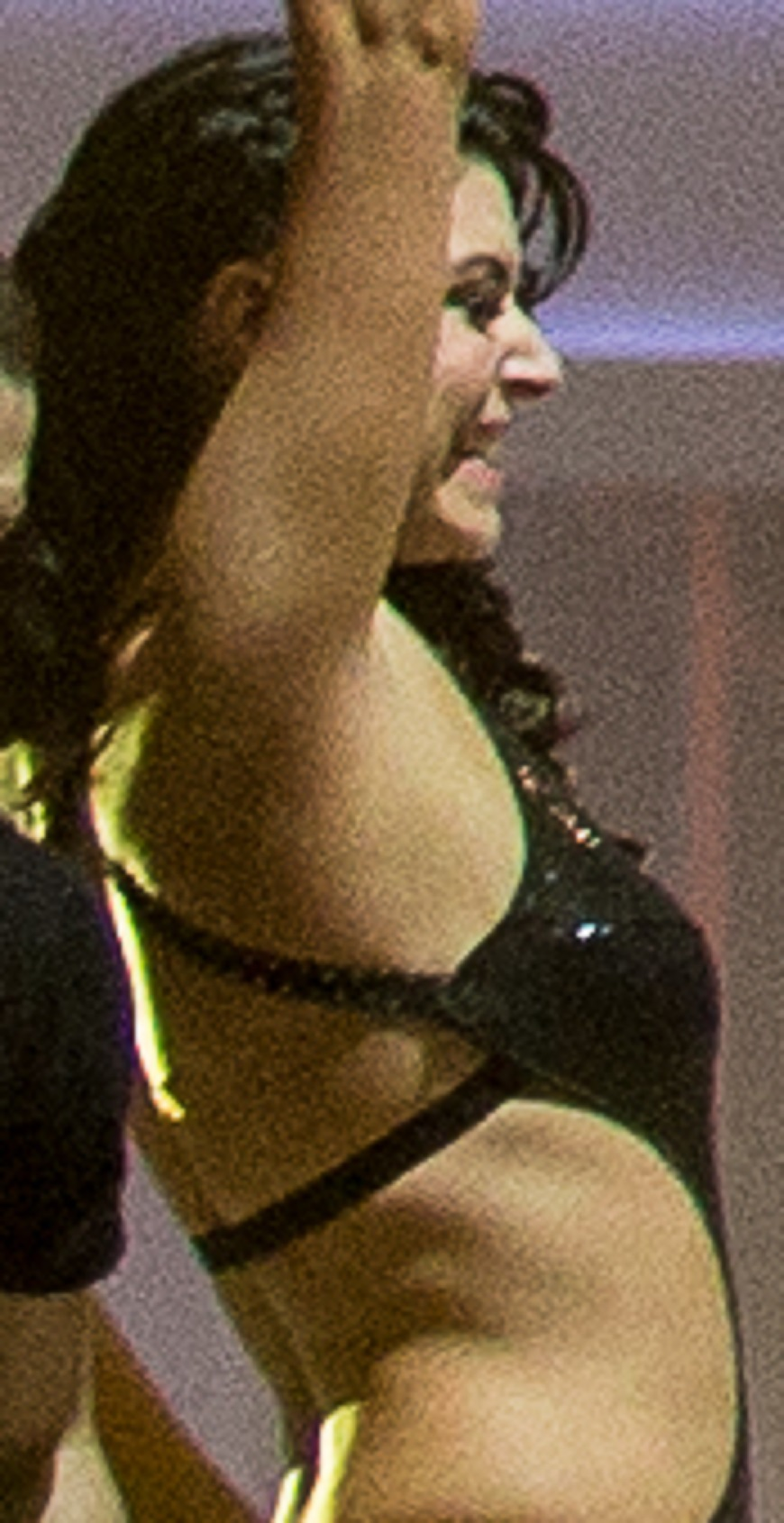
- Pascal on stage in Amnéville in 2014
- Born: December 2, 1984 (age 40); Agen, France
- Occupation: Dancer

Candice Pascal (born 2 December 1984) is a French dancer from Agen. She is also an actress and a model.

== Biography ==
Pascal's father owned a dance school in Agen. After gaining her baccalaureate from Lycée Saint-Caprais, she spent four years in New York followed by four years in Hong Kong, teaching dance and dancing. While in Hong Kong she signed a modelling contract. She has won professional Latin dance contests in France and Hong Kong. In 2010 to 2012, she undertook professional acting lessons at Acting International in Paris.

She is best known for her role in the television show Danse avec les stars. Since 2011, she has partnered with André Manoukian, Philippe Candeloro, Christophe Dominici, Damien Sargue, Corneille, Olivier Dion, Florent Mothe, Agustín Galiana (with whom she won season 8), Vincent Moscato, Hugo Philip, Gérémy Crédeville et Clémence Castel.

In 2019 she came fifth in the TF1 reality television programme Je suis une célébrité, sortez-moi de là! (I'm a Celebrity, Get Me Out of Here!) filmed in South Africa. She has also taken part in the game show Fort Boyard on France 2.

== Danse avec les Stars ==
Season	Partner	Notability (known for)	Place	Average (/40)
1	André Manoukian	Musician, songwriter, & actor	8th	20.00
2	Philippe Candeloro	Former Olympic figure skater	2nd	28.00
3	Christophe Dominici	Former rugby union player	10th	24.50
4	Damien Sargue	Singer	9th	28.00
5	Corneille	Singer	6th	29.69
6	Olivier Dion	Model & singer	3rd	32.64
7	Florent Mothe	Singer, actor, & musician	5th	32.30
8	Agustín Galiana	Actor	1st	35.42
9	Vincent Moscato	Former rugby union player & radio presenter	9th	19.67
10	Hugo Philip	Model and Influencer	8th	25.25
11	Gérémy Crédeville	Comedian	6th	26.71
12	Clémence Castel	Koh-Lanta winner and television personality	10th	20.00
13	James Denton	Actor	6th	25.04
