= Les Quatre Saisons =

Coordinates: 53°5′32.53″N 6°40′48.6″E

- Interactive map of Les Quatre Saisons

Restaurant information
- Established: 1977
- Closed: 1993
- Head chef: Jos P. Boomgaardt
- Food type: French
- Rating: Michelin Guide
- Location: Stationsweg 41, Zuidlaren, 9471 GK, Netherlands

Restaurant Les Quatre Saisons is a defunct restaurant in Zuidlaren, in the Netherlands. It was a fine dining restaurant that was awarded one Michelin star in 1981 and retained that rating until 1985.

The restaurant closed before 1993, as the Michelin Guide mentioned the later also starred restaurant De Vlindertuin at that address.

The restaurant was located in a renovated Saxonian farmhouse built in 1719. It is the same building that later housed the Michelin starred restaurant De Vlindertuin.

== See also ==
- List of Michelin starred restaurants in the Netherlands
