= Yeliseyev =

Yeliseyev or Eliseev (Russian: Елисеев) is a Russian surname. There are two different English transliterations. Notable people with the surname include:

== Yeliseyev ==
- Aleksandr Yeliseyev (born 1991), Russian footballer
- Aleksei Yeliseyev (born 1934), Soviet cosmonaut
- Andrey Yeliseyev (born 1991), Russian footballer
- Nikita Yeliseev (born 1959), Soviet and Russian literary and film critic, publicist and translator
- Sergei Yeliseyev disambiguation
- Viktor Yeliseyev (born 1950), Russian general and choirmaster
- Yevhen Yeliseyev (born 1989), Ukrainian footballer
- Yuriy Yeliseyev (1949–2025), Soviet footballer

== Eliseev ==
- Grigory Eliseev (1821–1891), Russian journalist
- Matvey Eliseev (born 1993), Russian biathlete
- Urii Eliseev (1996–2016), Russian chess player
- Vitali Eliseev (born 1950), Russian rower

== See also ==
- Eliseev
