= Danse avec les stars season 6 =

Danse avec les stars
- Season 6
- Promotional advertisement for the 6th season of Danse avec les Stars; L to R: Loïc Nottet, Olivier Dion, Marie Lopez, Véronic DiCaire, Djibril Cissé, Fabienne Carat, Vincent Niclo, Sophie Vouzelaud, Thierry Samitier and Priscilla Betti
- Celebrity winner: Loïc Nottet
- Professional winner: Denitsa Ikonomova
- No. of episodes: 9

Release
- Original network: TF1
- Original release: 24 October – 23 December 2015

Season chronology
- ← Previous; Season 5 Next → Season 7

The sixth season of the French version of Strictly Come Dancing premiered on TF1 on 24 October 2015, a little over a year after the fifth season. This time, 10 celebrities are paired with 10 professional ballroom dancers, less than the 11 of the previous season. Vincent Cerutti will not return as the main host for the season, being replaced by Sandrine Quétier, while Quétier's previous spot will be taken over by Season 4 contestant Laurent Ournac. Meanwhile, Fauve Hautot, one of the program's most popular dancers, was promoted to the position of judge, due to Season 5 judge M. Pokora being too busy with his concert tour.

== Participants ==
The names of eight allegedly participating celebrities were leaked by the media in the third week of June 2015, with several more names leaking over the following weeks, with many being correct but others, like TV personalities Igor and Grichka Bogdanoff, actor Issa Doumbia, singer Larusso, model and actress Victoria Silvstedt or YouTube personality Norman Thavaud, ending up being false.

Former footballer Djibril Cissé was the first celebrity confirmed by broadcast channel TF1, on 9 July, seven days after his name leaked, followed by singer/actor Vincent Niclo on 21 July, TV actress Fabienne Carat on 28 August, YouTube personality Marie 'EnjoyPhoenix' Lopez on 2 September, Singer/impressionist Véronic DiCaire on 8 September, Singer Loïc Nottet on 11 September, Actor Thierry Samittier on 14 September, singer/actress Priscilla Betti on 21 September, Model/singer Olivier Dion on 23 September and finally Miss France 2007 first runner-up Sophie Vouzelaud on 29 September.

TV presenter Karine Ferri had initially signed on for the season, but had to back out due to pregnancy so her spot was taken over by Priscilla Betti.

Celebrity	Occupation / known for	Professional partner	Status
Djibril Cissé	Former AC Arles footballer	Silvia Notargiacomo	Eliminated 1st on 31 October 2015
Thierry Samitier	Nos chers voisins actor	Emmanuelle Berne	Eliminated 2nd on 6 November 2015
Sophie Vouzelaud	Miss France 2007 first runner-up	Maxime Dereymez	Eliminated 3rd on 21 November 2015
Vincent Niclo	Tenor singer & actor	Katrina Patchett	Eliminated 4th on 28 November 2015
Fabienne Carat	Plus belle la vie actress	Julien Brugel; Christian Millette (Week 7)	Eliminated 5th & 6th on 12 December 2015
Véronic DiCaire	Singer & impressionist	Christian Millette; Julien Brugel (Week 7)	Eliminated 5th & 6th on 12 December 2015
Marie Lopez; EnjoyPhoenix	YouTube personality	Yann-Alrick Mortreuil; Christophe Licata (Week 7)	Eliminated 7th on 18 December 2015
Olivier Dion	Model & singer	Candice Pascal; Denitsa Ikonomova (Week 7)	Third Place on 23 December 2015
Priscilla Betti	Singer & actress	Christophe Licata; Yann-Alrick Mortreuil (Week 7)	Second Place on 23 December 2015
Loïc Nottet	The Voice Belgique finalist	Denitsa Ikonomova; Candice Pascal (Week 7)	Winners on 23 December 2015

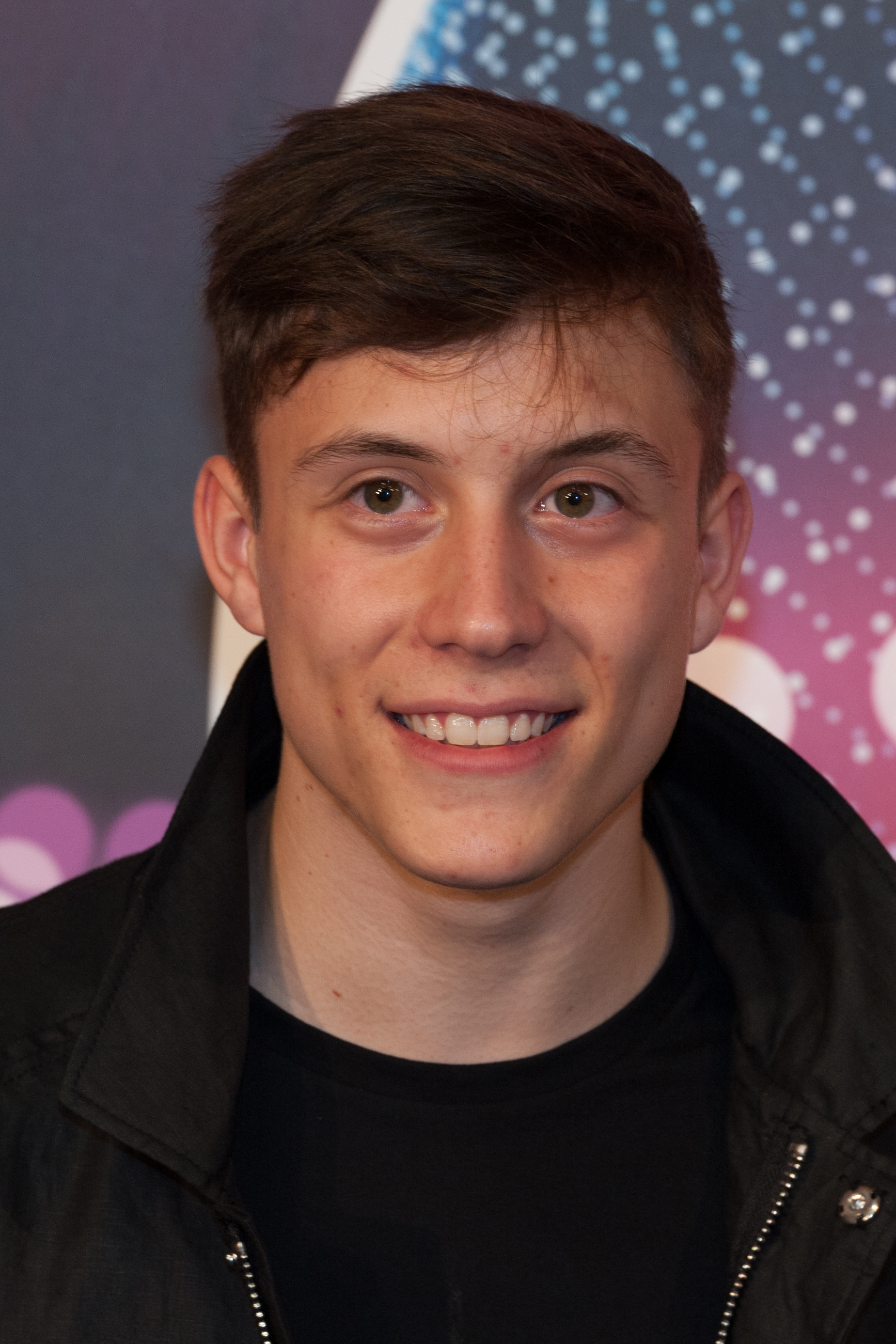
Loïc Nottet

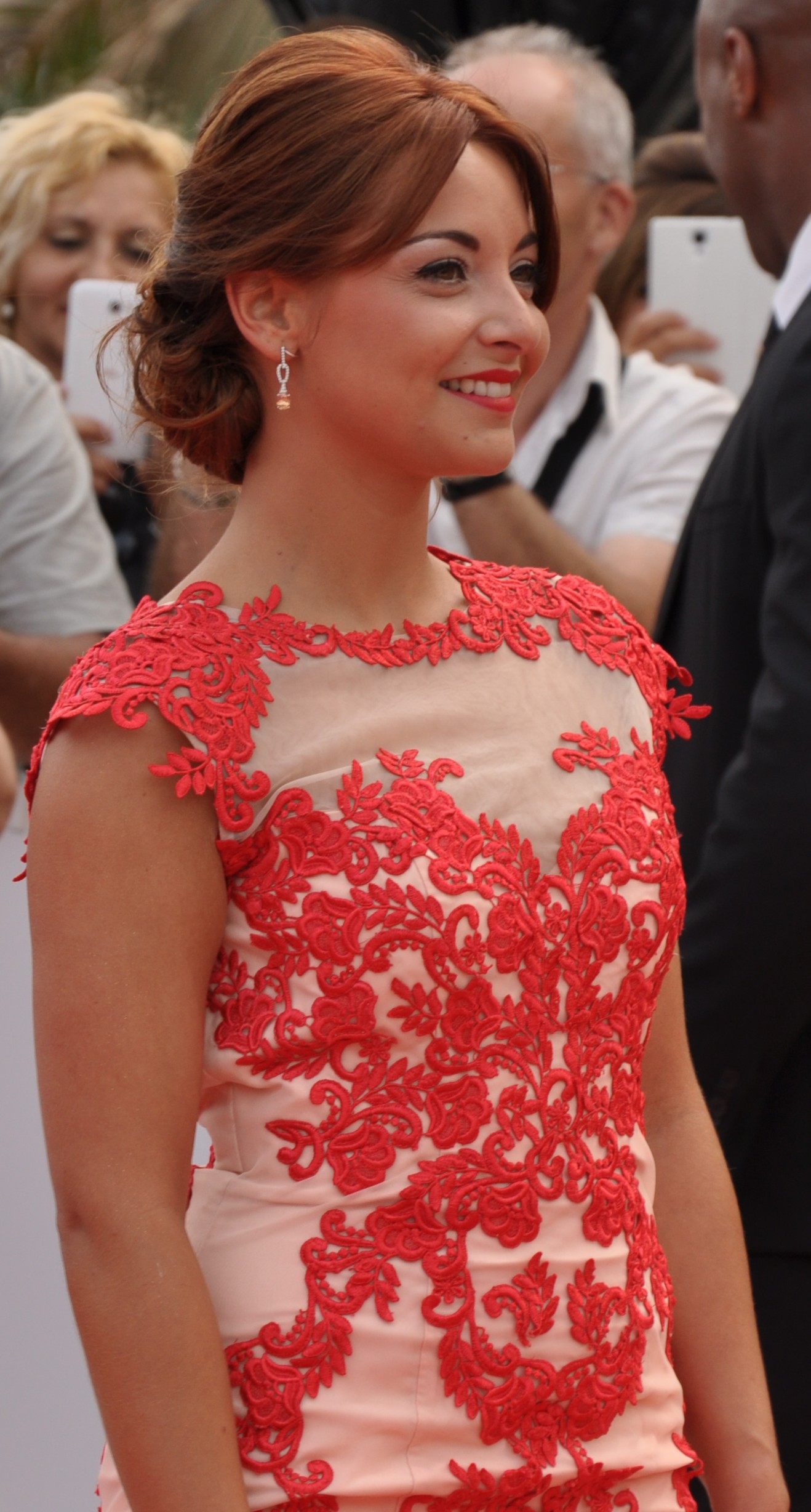
Priscilla Betti

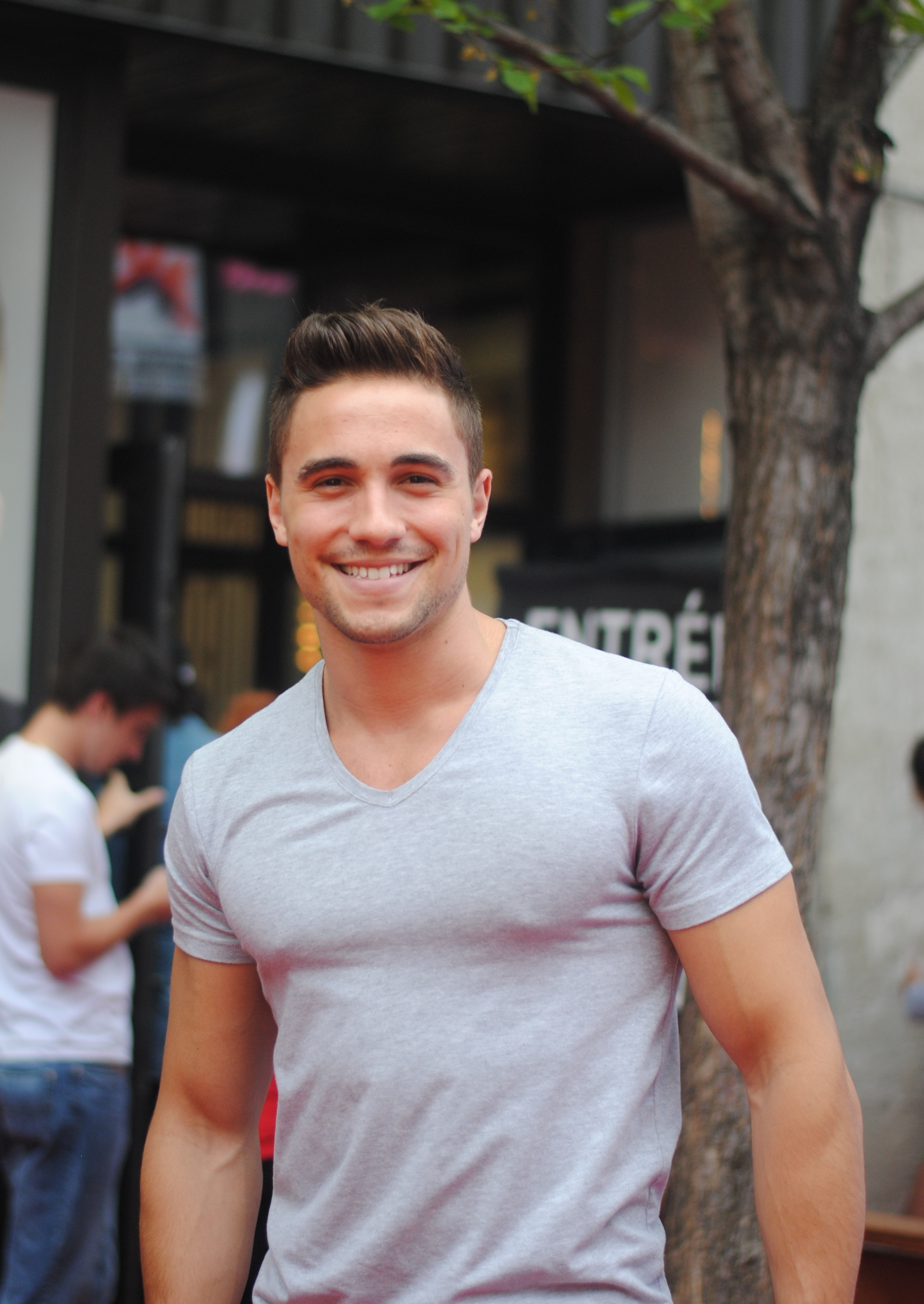
Olivier Dion

EnjoyPhoenix

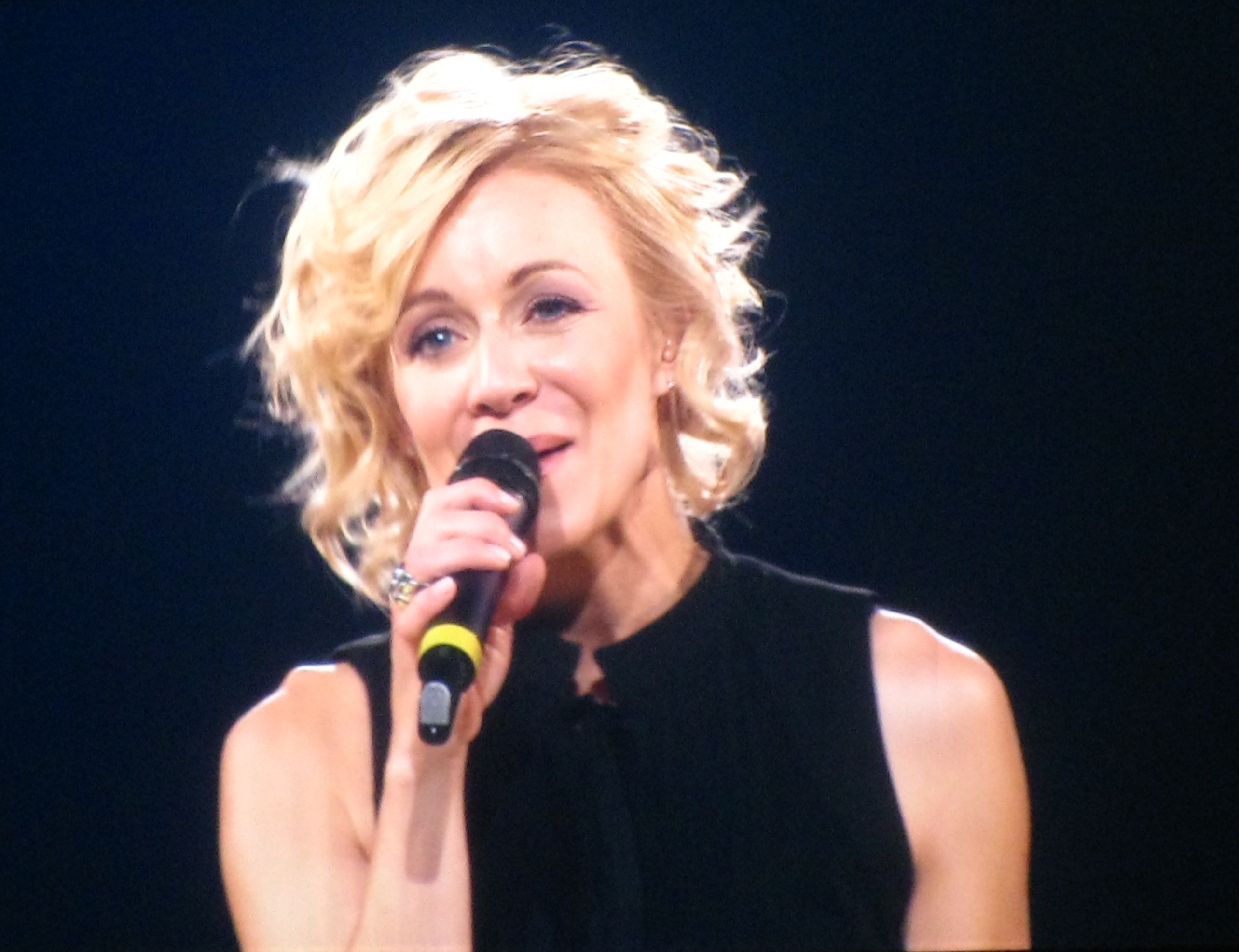
Véronic DiCaire

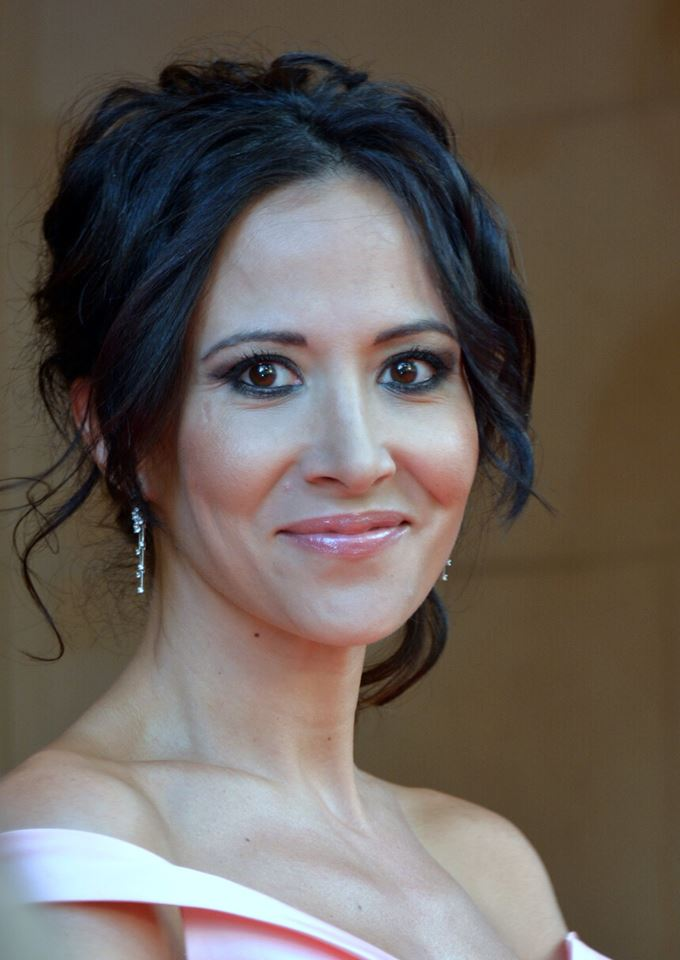
Fabienne Carat

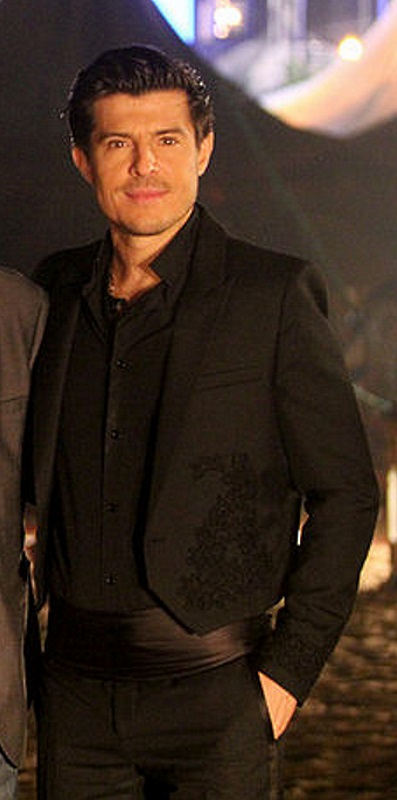
Vincent Niclo

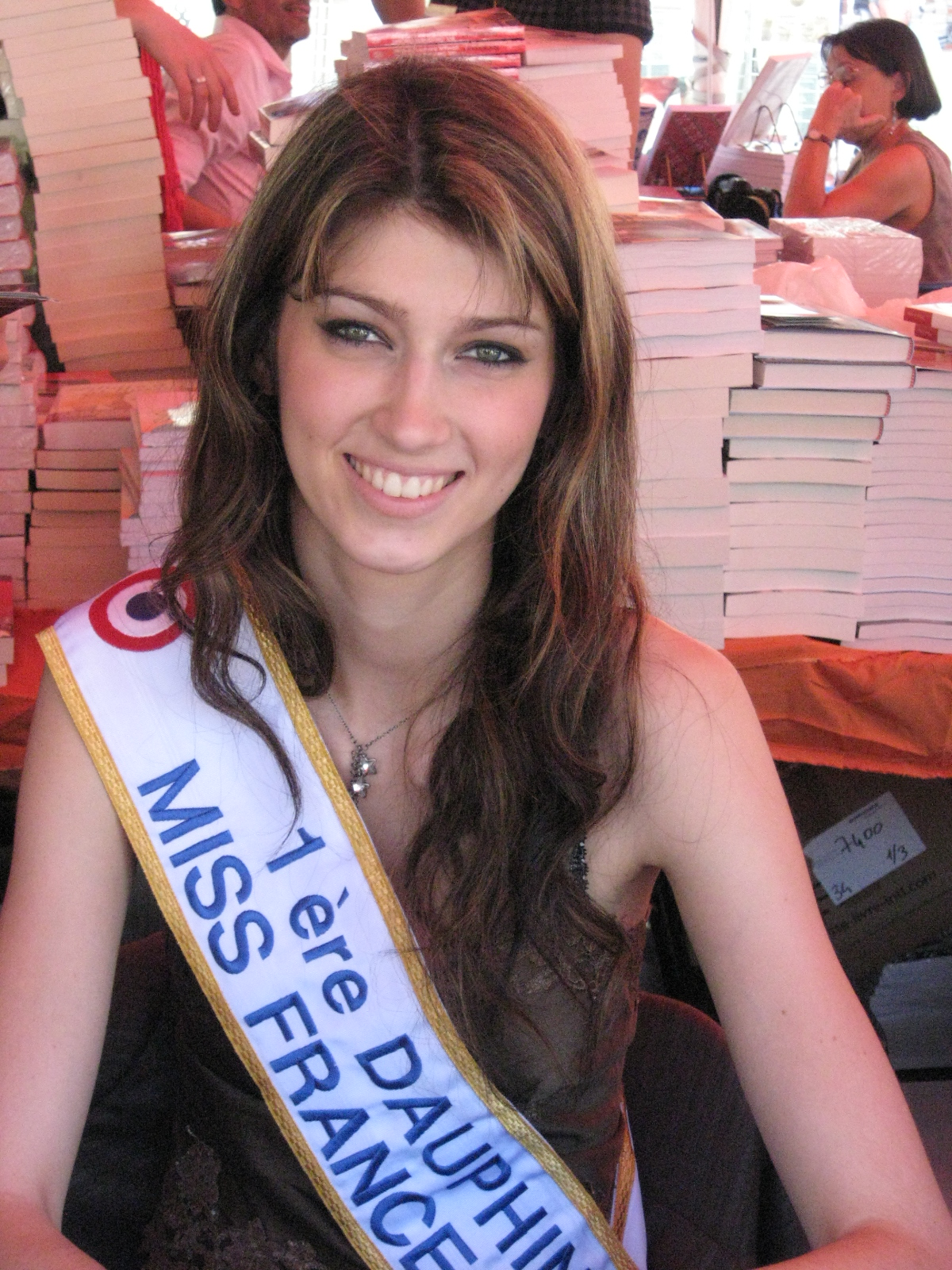
Sophie Vouzelaud

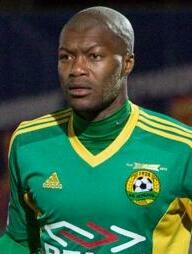
Djibril Cissé

== Scoring ==
Team	Place	1	2	1+2	3	4	5	6	7	8	7+8	9	10
Loïc & Denitsa	1	31	36	67	72	0	77	75 + 25 = 100	45 + 34 = 79	68 + 77 = 145	224	57 + 78 = 135	80 + 80 = 160
Priscilla & Christophe	2	34	33	67	59	0	69	70 + 30 = 100	40 + 47 = 87	67 + 74 = 141	228	52 + 75 = 127	72 + 78 = 150
Olivier & Candice	3	29	32	61	52	0	68 + 10 = 78	67 + 35 = 102	44 + 32 = 76	66 + 60 = 126	202	51 + 71 = 122	71 + 75 = 146
Marie & Yann-Alrick	4	22	29	51	53	0	55	55 + 20 = 75	40 + 34 = 74	52 + 51 = 103	177	46 + 59 = 105	
Véronic & Christian	5	30	32	62	62	0	68	73 + 40 = 113	39 + 47 = 86	63 + 70 = 133	219		
Fabienne & Julien	5	25	23	48	44	0	62	52 + 10 = 62	35 + 32 = 67	38 + 55 = 93	160		
Vincent & Katrina	7	26	29	55	55	0	57	63 + 15 = 78					
Sophie & Maxime	8	27	26	53	48	0	43						
Thierry & Emmanuelle	9	19	17	36	35								
Djibril & Silvia	10	25	23	48									

Red numbers indicate the couples with the lowest score for each week.
Blue numbers indicate the couples with the highest score for each week.
indicates the couples eliminated that week.
indicates the winning couple.
indicates the runner-up couple.
indicates the third place couple.
indicates the show was cancelled due to national mourning

=== Notes of each couples ===
For the totals, the notes from the duo of week 7 are count only once.

Couple	Total	10	9	8	7	6	5	4	3	2	1	Average
Loïc & Denitsa	88	43	31	9	1	3	—N/a	1	—N/a			9.2
Priscilla & Christophe	88	16	42	23	6	1	—N/a					8.8
Olivier & Candice	88	9	29	27	17	2	4	—N/a				8.2
Marie & Yann-Alrick	72	—N/a	4	20	26	13	4	5	—N/a			6.9
Véronic & Christian	58	4	20	27	6	1	—N/a					8.3
Fabienne & Julien	58	—N/a	2	10	17	12	12	2	3	—N/a		6.3
Vincent & Katrina	32	—N/a	1	14	10	4	3	—N/a				7.2
Sophie & Maxime	24	—N/a			12	5	3	3	1	—N/a		6
Thierry & Emmanuelle	16	—N/a				3	5	5	2	1	—N/a	4.4
Djibril & Silvia	8	—N/a			3	3	1	1	—N/a			6
Total	517	70	125	128	95	46	30	16	6	1	0	7.8

== Averages ==
This table only counts dances scored on the traditional 40-point scale. Starting from week 3, both technical and artistic scores are tallied.

Rank by average	Place	Couple	Total	Number of dances	Average
1	1	Loïc & Denitsa	810	13	36.82
2	2	Priscilla & Christophe	770	13	35.00
3	5	Véronic & Christian	484	9	33.38
4	3	Olivier & Candice	718	13	32.64
5	7	Vincent & Katrina	230	5	28.75
6	4	Marie & Yann-Alrick	496	11	27.56
7	5	Fabienne & Julien	366	9	25.24
8	8	Sophie & Maxime	144	4	24.00
8	10	Djibril & Silvia	48	2	24.00
10	9	Thierry & Emmanuelle	71	3	17.75

== Highest and lowest scoring performances ==
The best and worst performances in each dance according to the judges' marks are as follows (starting from week 3, the average of the technical and artistic scores is used):

Dance	Best dancer	Best score	Worst dancer	Worst score
Foxtrot	Priscilla Betti	33.5	Djibril Cissé	25
Cha-Cha-Cha	Loïc Nottet; Priscilla Betti	39	Thierry Samitier	17.5
Quickstep	Loïc Nottet	37.5	Thierry Samitier	19
Samba	Olivier Dion	33.5	Djibril Cissé	23
Jive	Loïc Nottet	36	EnjoyPhoenix	26.5
Paso Doble	Loïc Nottet	36	Fabienne Carat	22
Rumba	Priscilla Betti	37	Thierry Samitier	17
Waltz	Priscilla Betti	37.5	Fabienne Carat	19
Tango	Loïc Nottet	38.5	Vincent Niclo	27.5
Mambo	Priscilla Betti	34.5	Priscilla Betti	34.5
Contemporary	Loïc Nottet	40	Olivier Dion	30
Argentine Tango	EnjoyPhoenix	29.5	Sophie Vouzelaud	21.5
Charleston	Olivier Dion	35.5	EnjoyPhoenix	27.5
Disco	Fabienne Carat	31	Fabienne Carat	31
Bollywood	Olivier Dion	37.5	Olivier Dion	34
American Smooth	Véronic DiCaire	36.5	Véronic DiCaire	36.5
Salsa	Priscilla Betti	34.7	Priscilla Betti	34.7
Lindy Hop	EnjoyPhoenix	30.7	EnjoyPhoenix	30.7
Jazz Broadway	Loïc Nottet	40	Loïc Nottet	40

== Couples' Highest and lowest scoring performances ==
According to the traditional 40-point scale (starting from week 3, the average of the technical and artistic scores is used):

Couples	Highest Scoring Dances	Lowest Scoring Dances
Loïc & Denitsa	Jazz Broadway; Contemporary(40)	Foxtrot (31)
Priscilla & Christophe	Cha-Cha-Cha (39)	Rumba (29.5)
Olivier & Candice	Bollywood (37.5)	Paso Doble (26)
Marie & Yann-Alrick	Paso Doble (32)	Cha-Cha-Cha (22)
Véronic & Christian	American Smooth (36.5)	Foxtrot (30)
Fabienne & Julien	Disco (31)	Waltz (19)
Vincent & Katrina	Quickstep (31.5)	Cha-Cha-Cha (26)
Sophie & Maxime	Foxtrot (27)	Argentine Tango (21.5)
Thierry & Emmanuelle	Quickstep (19)	Rumba (17)
Djibril & Silvia	Foxtrot (25)	Samba (23)

== Styles, scores and songs ==
=== Week 1 ===
Individual judges scores in the chart below (given in parentheses) are listed in this order from left to right: Fauve Hautot, Jean-Marc Généreux, Marie-Claude Pietragalla, Chris Marques.

Running order

Couple	Score	Style	Music
Véronic & Christian	30 (8,8,7,7)	Foxtrot	New York, New York - Frank Sinatra
Sophie & Maxime	27 (7,7,7,6)	Foxtrot	Over the Rainbow - Judy Garland
Vincent & Katrina	26 (8,5,8,5)	Cha-Cha-Cha	Uptown Funk - Bruno Mars
Loïc & Denitsa	31 (8,6,9,8)	Foxtrot	Homeless - Marina Kaye
Thierry & Emmanuelle	19 (5,4,6,4)	Quickstep	Hey Pachuco - Jim Carrey
Priscilla & Christophe	34 (9,8,9,8)	Cha-Cha-Cha	I Wanna Dance with Somebody (Who Loves Me) - Whitney Houston
Fabienne & Julien	25 (7,6,7,5)	Samba	Andalouse - Kendji Girac
Olivier & Candice	29 (8,7,7,7)	Jive	Proud Mary - Ike & Tina Turner
Djibril & Silvia	25 (7,6,6,6)	Foxtrot	It Had to Be You - Isham Jones
Marie & Yann-Alrick	22 (6,5,6,5)	Cha-Cha-Cha	Avenir - Louane Emera

=== Week 2 : Personal Story Week ===
Individual judges scores in the chart below (given in parentheses) are listed in this order from left to right: Fauve Hautot, Jean-Marc Généreux, Marie-Claude Pietragalla, Chris Marques.

Couple	Score		Style	Music	Result
Couple	Week 2	Week 1+2	Style	Music	Result
Sophie & Maxime	26 (7,7,7,5)	53	Quickstep	Single Ladies (Put a Ring on It) - Beyoncé	Safe
Véronic & Christian	32 (8,8,8,8)	62	Jive	J'irai où tu iras – Céline Dion & Jean-Jacques Goldman	Safe
Loïc & Denitsa	36 (9,8,10,9)	67	Paso Doble	Thriller - Michael Jackson	Safe
Fabienne & Julien	23 (6,5,7,5)	48	Rumba	Et tu danses avec lui - C. Jérôme	Safe
Priscilla & Christophe	33 (9,7,9,8)	67	Jive	Shake It Off - Taylor Swift	Safe
Thierry & Emmanuelle	17 (5,4,5,3)	36	Rumba	Still Loving You - Scorpions	Last to be called Safe
Vincent & Katrina	29 (8,6,8,7)	55	Foxtrot	Nessun dorma - Luciano Pavarotti	Safe
Marie & Yann-Alrick	29 (8,7,7,7)	51	Waltz	Hallelujah - Leonard Cohen	Safe
Djibril & Silvia	23 (7,5,7,4)	48	Samba	Samba de Janeiro - Bellini	Eliminated
Olivier & Candice	32 (8,8,8,8)	61	Rumba	Chasing Cars - Snow Patrol	Safe

=== Week 3 : 80's ===
Individual judges scores in the chart below (given in parentheses) are listed in this order from left to right: Fauve Hautot, Jean-Marc Généreux, Marie-Claude Pietragalla, Chris Marques.

Running order

Couple	Results			Style	Music	Result
Couple	Artistic	Technical	Total	Style	Music	Result
Priscilla & Christophe	30 (7,8,8,7)	29 (8,6,8,7)	59	Rumba	Un roman d'amitié - Elsa Lunghini & Glenn Medeiros	Safe
Vincent & Katrina	28 (7,7,7,7)	27 (7,6,8,6)	55	Tango	Here Comes the Rain Again - Eurythmics	Safe
Loïc & Denitsa	37 (9,9,10,9)	35 (9,8,9,9)	72	Jive	Ça plane pour moi - Plastic Bertrand	Safe
Sophie & Maxime	27 (7,7,7,6)	21 (6,5,6,4)	48	Rumba	She's Like the Wind - Patrick Swayze	Safe
Olivier & Candice	27 (6,7,8,6)	25 (7,5,8,5)	52	Paso Doble	Ghostbusters - Ray Parker Jr.	Last to be called Safe
Marie & Yann-Alrick	29 (8,7,7,7)	24 (8,4,7,5)	53	Jive	Le Banana Split - Lio	Safe
Thierry & Emmanuelle	21 (6,5,6,4)	14 (4,2,5,3)	35	Cha-Cha-Cha	Le Jerk - Thierry Hazard	Eliminated
Véronic & Christian	32 (8,8,9,7)	30 (8,6,8,8)	62	Rumba	Si j'étais un homme - Diane Tell	Safe
Fabienne & Julien	23 (6,5,6,6)	21 (6,4,6,5)	44	Paso Doble	Dallas Theme - Jerrold Immel	Safe

=== Week 4 ===
Due to the November 2015 Paris attacks happening the night before, DALS announced that the week four show was cancelled.

=== Week 5 : Mythic Dance ===
Individual judges scores in the chart below (given in parentheses) are listed in this order from left to right: Fauve Hautot, Jean-Marc Généreux, Marie-Claude Pietragalla, Chris Marques.

Running order

Couple	Results			Style	Music	Safe
Couple	Artistic	Technical	Total	Style	Music	Safe
Priscilla & Christophe	35 (8,9,9,9)	34 (9,8,9,8)	69	Mambo	(I've Had) The Time of My Life - Bill Medley & Jennifer Warnes	Safe
Vincent & Katrina	32 (8,8,8,8)	25 (7,5,7,6)	57	Jive	Jailhouse Rock - Elvis Presley	Safe
Loïc & Denitsa	39 (10,10,10,9)	38 (10,9,10,9)	77	Contemporary	Chandelier - Sia	Safe
Sophie & Maxime	25 (7,7,7,4)	18 (5,4,6,3)	43	Argentine Tango	You Can Leave Your Hat On - Joe Cocker	Eliminated
Véronic & Christian	33 (9,9,8,7)	35 (9,9,8,9)	68	Tango	Smooth Criminal - Michael Jackson	Safe
Marie & Yann-Alrick	31 (8,7,8,8)	24 (7,6,7,4)	55	Charleston	The Artist Theme	Safe
Fabienne & Julien	32 (8,8,9,7)	30 (7,7,9,7)	62	Disco	You Should Be Dancing - Bee Gees	Last to be called Safe
Olivier & Candice	35 (9,9,9,8)	33 (9,7,9,8)	68	Bollywood	Jai Ho! (You Are My Destiny) - A. R. Rahman	Safe
Best Lift Challenge
Olivier & Candice	+ 10		78	/	Waiting For Love - Avicii	
Priscilla & Christophe	+ 0		69	/	Waiting For Love - Avicii	
Vincent & Katrina	+ 0		57	/	Waiting For Love - Avicii	
Loïc & Denitsa	+ 0		77	/	Waiting For Love - Avicii	
Sophie & Maxime	+ 0		43	/	Waiting For Love - Avicii	
Véronic & Christian	+ 0		68	/	Waiting For Love - Avicii	
Marie & Yann-Alrick	+ 0		55	/	Waiting For Love - Avicii	
Fabienne & Julien	+ 0		62	/	Waiting For Love - Avicii	

=== Week 6 : Disney Night ===
Individual judges scores in the chart below (given in parentheses) are listed in this order from left to right: Fauve Hautot, Jean-Marc Généreux, Marie-Claude Pietragalla, Chris Marques.

Running order

Couple	Results			Style	Music	Result
Couple	Artistic	Technical	Total	Style	Music	Result
Priscilla & Christophe	33 (9,8,8,8)	37 (9,10,9,9)	70	Contemporary	Let It Go - Frozen	Safe
Véronic & Christian	37 (10,9,9,9)	36 (9,9,9,9)	73	American Smooth	Beauty and the Beast	Safe
Vincent & Katrina	32 (7,8,9,8)	31 (8,7,8,8)	63	Quickstep	Aladdin's song	Eliminated
Marie & Yann-Alrick	32 (8,8,8,8)	23 (6,6,7,4)	55	Foxtrot	Alice in Wonderland's song	Safe
Olivier & Candice	35 (9,9,9,8)	32 (8,7,9,8)	67	Samba	The Jungle Book's song	Safe
Fabienne & Julien	29 (8,7,8,6)	23 (7,6,7,3)	52	Samba	The Little Mermaid's song	Safe
Loïc & Denitsa	39 (10,10,10,9)	36 (10,8,9,9)	75	Quickstep	Supercalifragilisticexpialidocious	Safe
Samba Relay
Véronic & Christian	+ 40		113	Samba	The Bare Necessities – The Jungle Book	
Olivier & Candice	+ 35		102	Samba	The Bare Necessities – The Jungle Book	
Priscilla & Christophe	+ 30		100	Samba	The Bare Necessities – The Jungle Book	
Loïc & Denitsa	+ 25		100	Samba	The Bare Necessities – The Jungle Book	
Marie & Yann-Alrick	+ 20		75	Samba	The Bare Necessities – The Jungle Book	
Vincent & Katrina	+ 15		78	Samba	The Bare Necessities – The Jungle Book	
Fabienne & Julien	+ 10		62	Samba	The Bare Necessities – The Jungle Book	

=== Week 7 : Switch ===
Individual judges scores in the chart below (given in parentheses) are listed in this order from left to right: Fauve Hautot, Jean-Marc Généreux, Marie-Claude Pietragalla, Chris Marques.

Running order

Couple	Score			Style	Music
Couple	by jury	by spectators	Total	Style	Music
Priscilla & Yann-Alrick	32 (8,8,9,7)	8	40	Tango	Sway - The Pussycat Dolls
Véronic & Julien	32 (8,8,8,8)	7	39	Samba	Taj Mahal - Salomé de Bahia
Loïc & Candice	36 (9,9,10,8)	9	45	Rumba	La superbe - Benjamin Biolay
Fabienne & Christian	27 (7,7,8,5)	8	35	Rumba	You Are So Beautiful - Joe Cocker
Marie & Christophe	31 (9,7,8,7)	9	40	Paso Doble	Let's Dance - David Bowie
Olivier & Denitsa	35 (10,9,9,7)	9	44	Waltz	I Put a Spell on You - Annie Lennox

Duos

Couple	Score			Total	Style	Music
Couple	by jury	by spectators	Total	Total	Style	Music
Priscilla & Yann-Alrick; Véronic & Julien	38 (10,10,9,9)	9	47	87; 86	Jive	Girls Just Want to Have Fun - Miley Cyrus
Fabienne & Christian; Olivier & Denitsa	24 (7,5,7,5)	8	32	67; 76	Jive	Lili voulait aller danser - Julien Clerc
Loïc & Candice; Marie & Christophe	25 (8,6,7,4)	9	34	79; 74	Cha-Cha-Cha	One More Time - Daft Punk

=== Week 8: Dance trio week ===
Individual judges scores in the chart below (given in parentheses) are listed in this order from left to right: Fauve Hautot, Jean-Marc Généreux, Marie-Claude Pietragalla, Chris Marques

Running order

Couple	Results					Style	Music	Result
Couple	Artistic	Technical	Total		Week 7+8	Style	Music	Result
Priscilla & Christophe	34 (9,8,9,8)	33 (9,7,9,8)	67	141	228	Foxtrot	Si, Maman Si - France Gall	Safe
Priscilla & Christophe	37 (10,9,9,9)	37 (10,9,9,9)	74	141	228	Rumba (with Emmanuelle Berne)	Glory Box - Portishead	Safe
Véronic & Christian	32 (8,8,8,8)	31 (8,8,8,7)	63	133	219	Quickstep	What a Wonderful World - Louis Armstrong	Eliminated
Véronic & Christian	33 (8,9,8,8)	37 (10,9,9,9)	70	133	219	Cha-Cha-Cha (with Maxime Dereymez)	I'm Every Woman - Chaka Khan	Eliminated
Olivier & Candice	35 (10,8,9,8)	31 (9,7,8,7)	66	126	202	Foxtrot	Singin' in the Rain - Arthur Freed	Last to be called Safe
Olivier & Candice	32 (8,8,8,8)	28 (7,7,7,7)	60	126	202	Contemporary (with Coralie Licata)	Saint Claude - Christine and the Queens	Last to be called Safe
Marie & Yann-Alrick	30 (8,7,8,7)	22 (6,6,6,4)	52	103	177	Cha-Cha-Cha	Want to Want Me - Jason Derulo	Last to be called Safe
Marie & Yann-Alrick	28 (7,7,7,7)	23 (6,6,6,5)	51	103	177	Rumba (with Guillaume Foucault)	Wings - Birdy	Last to be called Safe
Fabienne & Julien	22 (5,5,6,6)	16 (4,3,6,3)	38	93	160	Waltz	Sissi Imperatrice - Anton Profes	Eliminated
Fabienne & Julien	30 (8,7,8,7)	25 (7,5,8,5)	55	93	160	Cha-Cha-Cha (with Gabin Giband)	I'm a Slave 4 U - Britney Spears	Eliminated
Loïc & Denitsa	36 (9,8,10,9)	32 (9,8,9,6)	68	145	224	Rumba	Pour Me Comprendre - Véronique Sanson	Safe
Loïc & Denitsa	39 (10,9,10,10)	38 (10,9,10,9)	77	145	224	Tango (with Silvia Notargiacomo)	Carmen - Stromae	Safe

=== Week 9 Semi-Finals ===
Individual judges scores in the chart below (given in parentheses) are listed in this order from left to right: Fauve Hautot, Jean-Marc Généreux, Marie-Claude Pietragalla, Chris Marques

Running order

Couple	Results				Style	Music	Result
Couple	Artistic	Technical	Total		Style	Music	Result
Priscilla & Christophe	26 (8,9,9,X)	26 (9,8,9,X)	52	127	Salsa (coached by Chris Marques)	Let's Get Loud - Jennifer Lopez	Safe
Priscilla & Christophe	39 (10,10,10,9)	36 (9,9,9,9)	75	127	Waltz	Amazing Grace - John Newton	Safe
Olivier & Candice	27 (X,10,9,8)	24 (X,8,8,8)	51	122	Rumba (coached by Fauve Hautot)	She's the One - Robbie Williams	Bottom 2
Olivier & Candice	36 (10,9,9,8)	35 (9,9,9,8)	71	122	Charleston	All Night - Parov Stellar	Bottom 2
Marie & Yann-Alrick	25 (9,X,8,8)	21 (7,X,8,6)	46	105	Lindy Hop (coached by Jean-Marc Généreux)	Think - Aretha Franklin	Eliminated
Marie & Yann-Alrick	31 (7,8,8,8)	28 (7,7,7,7)	59	105	Argentine Tango	Divine Idylle - Vanessa Paradis	Eliminated
Loïc & Denitsa	29 (10,10,X,9)	28 (10,9,X,9)	57	135	Contemporary (coached by Marie-Claude Pietragella)	Le Lac des Cygnes - Pyotr Ilyich Tchaikovsky	Safe
Loïc & Denitsa	40 (10,10,10,10)	38 (9,9,10,10)	78	135	Cha-Cha-Cha	Can You Feel It - The Jacksons	Safe
Dance Duel
Olivier & Candice	73%				Jive	New York Avec Toi – Téléphone	Safe
Marie & Yann-Alrick	27%				Jive	New York Avec Toi – Téléphone	Eliminated

=== Week 10 Finals ===
Individual judges scores in the chart below (given in parentheses) are listed in this order from left to right: Fauve Hautot, Jean-Marc Généreux, Marie-Claude Pietragalla, Chris Marques

Running order

Couple	Results				Style	Music	Result
Couple	Artistic	Technical	Total		Style	Music	Result
Priscilla & Christophe	38 (10,10,9,9)	34 (9,8,9,8)	72	150	Quickstep	Sparkling Diamonds - Nicole Kidman	2nd Place
Priscilla & Christophe	39 (10,10,10,9)	39 (10,10,9,10)	78	150	Cha-Cha-Cha	I Wanna Dance with Somebody - Whitney Houston	2nd Place
Olivier & Candice	38 (10,10,9,9)	33 (9,8,9,7)	71	146	Tango	Toxic - Britney Spears	3rd Place
Olivier & Candice	39 (10,10,10,9)	36 (9,9,9,9)	75	146	Bollywood	Jai Ho - A. R. Rahman	3rd Place
Loïc & Denitsa	40 (10,10,10,10)	40 (10,10,10,10)	80	160	Jazz Broadway	Don't Rain on My Parade - Lea Michele	Winner
Loïc & Denitsa	40 (10,10,10,10)	40 (10,10,10,10)	80	160	Contemporary	Chandelier - Sia	Winner
The Last Dance
Loic & Denitsa	68%				Freestyle	Don't Stop Me Now – Queen	
Priscilla & Christophe	32%				Freestyle	Your Song – Elton John	

== Call-Out Order ==
The Table Lists in which order the contestants' fates were revealed by Quétier and Ournac.

Contestant call-out order
Order	2	3	4	5	6	8	9	10
1	Priscilla & Christophe	Loïc & Denitsa	N/A	Loïc & Denitsa	Loïc & Denitsa	Priscilla & Christophe	Olivier & Candice	Loïc & Denitsa
2	Vincent & Katrina	Marie & Yann-Alrick	N/A	Priscilla & Christophe	Olivier & Candice	Loïc & Denitsa	Loïc & Denitsa	Priscilla & Christophe
3	Sophie & Maxime	Vincent & Katrina	N/A	Olivier & Candice	Véronic & Christian	Marie & Yann-Alrick	Priscilla & Christophe	Olivier & Candice
4	Véronic & Christian	Sophie & Maxime	N/A	Vincent & Katrina	Priscilla & Christophe	Fabienne & Julien	Marie & Yann-Alrick	
5	Loïc & Denitsa	Priscilla & Christophe	N/A	Marie & Yann-Alrick	Marie & Yann-Alrick	Véronic & Christian		
6	Marie & Yann-Alrick	Véronic & Christian	N/A	Véronic & Christian	Fabienne & Julien	Olivier & Candice		
7	Fabienne & Julien	Fabienne & Julien	N/A	Fabienne & Julien	Vincent & Katrina			
8	Olivier & Candice	Olivier & Candice	N/A	Sophie & Maxime				
9	Thierry & Emmanuelle	Thierry & Emmanuelle						
10	Djibril & Silvia							

This couple came in first place with the judges.
This couple came in last place with the judges but were saved.
This couple came in last place with the judges and was eliminated.
This couple were in danger but was saved.
This couple was eliminated.
This couple won the competition.
This couple came in second in the competition.
This couple came in third in the competition.

== Dance Chart ==
Couple	1	2	3	4	5	6		7		8	9		10		
Loïc & Denitsa	Foxtrot	Paso Doble	Jive		Contemporary	Quickstep	Samba Relay	Rumba (with Candice)	Cha-Cha-Cha (with Marie)	Rumba	Contemporary (with Marie-Claude)	Cha-Cha-Cha	Jazz Broadway	Contemporary	Freestyle
Loïc & Denitsa	Foxtrot	Paso Doble	Jive		Contemporary	Quickstep	Samba Relay	Rumba (with Candice)	Cha-Cha-Cha (with Marie)	Tango (with Silvia)	Contemporary (with Marie-Claude)	Cha-Cha-Cha	Jazz Broadway	Contemporary	Freestyle
Priscilla & Christophe	Cha-Cha-Cha	Jive	Rumba		Mambo	Contemporary	Samba Relay	Tango (with Yann-Alrick)	Jive (with Véronic)	Foxtrot	Salsa (with Chris)	Waltz	Quickstep	Cha-Cha-Cha	Freestyle
Priscilla & Christophe	Cha-Cha-Cha	Jive	Rumba		Mambo	Contemporary	Samba Relay	Tango (with Yann-Alrick)	Jive (with Véronic)	Rumba (with Emmanuelle)	Salsa (with Chris)	Waltz	Quickstep	Cha-Cha-Cha	Freestyle
Olivier & Candice	Jive	Rumba	Paso Doble		Bollywood	Samba	Samba Relay	Waltz (with Denitsa)	Jive (with Fabienne)	Foxtrot	Rumba (with Fauve)	Charleston	Tango	Bollywood	
Olivier & Candice	Jive	Rumba	Paso Doble		Bollywood	Samba	Samba Relay	Waltz (with Denitsa)	Jive (with Fabienne)	Contemporary (with Coralie)	Rumba (with Fauve)	Charleston	Tango	Bollywood	
Marie & Yann-Alrick	Cha-Cha-Cha	Waltz	Jive		Charleston	Foxtrot	Samba Relay	Paso Doble (with Christophe)	Cha-Cha-Cha (with Loïc)	Cha-Cha-Cha	Lindy Hop (with Jean-Marc)	Argentine Tango			
Marie & Yann-Alrick	Cha-Cha-Cha	Waltz	Jive		Charleston	Foxtrot	Samba Relay	Paso Doble (with Christophe)	Cha-Cha-Cha (with Loïc)	Rumba (with Guillaume)	Lindy Hop (with Jean-Marc)	Argentine Tango			
Véronic & Christian	Foxtrot	Jive	Rumba		Tango	American Smooth	Samba Relay	Samba (with Julien)	Jive (with Priscilla)	Quickstep					
Véronic & Christian	Foxtrot	Jive	Rumba		Tango	American Smooth	Samba Relay	Samba (with Julien)	Jive (with Priscilla)	Cha-Cha-Cha (with Maxime)					
Fabienne & Julien	Samba	Rumba	Paso Doble		Disco	Samba	Samba Relay	Rumba (with Christian)	Jive (with Olivier)	Waltz					
Fabienne & Julien	Samba	Rumba	Paso Doble		Disco	Samba	Samba Relay	Rumba (with Christian)	Jive (with Olivier)	Cha-Cha-Cha (with Gabin)					
Vincent & Katrina	Cha-Cha-Cha	Foxtrot	Tango		Jive	Quickstep	Samba Relay								
Sophie & Maxime	Foxtrot	Quickstep	Rumba		Argentine Tango										
Thierry & Emmanuelle	Quickstep	Rumba	Cha-Cha-Cha												
Djibril & Silvia	Foxtrot	Samba													

Highest scoring dance
Lowest scoring dance
Danced, but not scored

== Musical Guests ==
Date	Performers	Tracks Performed	Dancers
6 November 2015	Sabrina Salerno	Boys	Denitsa Ikonomova, Katrina Patchett, Maxime Dereymez, Christian Millete, Christophe Licata, Silvia Notargiacomo, Candice Pascal, Yann-Alrick Mortreuil, Emmanuelle Berne & Julien Brugel
6 November 2015	Patrick Hernandez	Born to Be Alive	Denitsa Ikonomova, Katrina Patchett, Maxime Dereymez, Christian Millete, Christophe Licata, Silvia Notargiacomo, Candice Pascal, Emmanuelle Berne, Coarlie Licata, Julien Brugel, Yann-Alrick Mortreuil, Laurent Ournac & Jean-Marc Généreux
21 November 2015	La Légende du roi Arthur	Quelque chose de magique	Denitsa Ikonomova, Katrina Patchett, Maxime Dereymez, Christian Millete, Christophe Licata, Silvia Notargiacomo, Candice Pascal, Yann-Alrick Mortreuil, Emmanuelle Berne & Julien Brugel
5 December 2015	Matt Pokora	Avant nous	Katrina Patchett, Yann-Alrick Mortreuil, Christophe Licata, Coralie Licata
12 December 2015	Kendji Girac	Andalouse, Me quemo & Les yeux de la mama	Fauve Hautot, Denitsa Ikonomova, Silvia Notargiacomo, Candice Pascal, Katrina Patchett, Christophe Licata, Coralie Licata, Yann-Alrick Mortreuil, Julien Brugel, Guillame Foucault)
18 December 2015	David Guetta	Hey Mama, Bang My Head	Fauve Hautot, Katrina Patchett, Silvia Notargiacomo, Emmanuelle Berne, Maxime Dereymez, Guillame Foucault, Christian Millete, Julien Brugel
23 December 2015	Shy'm		
