= Vincent Niclo =

French pop opera tenor singer (born 1975)

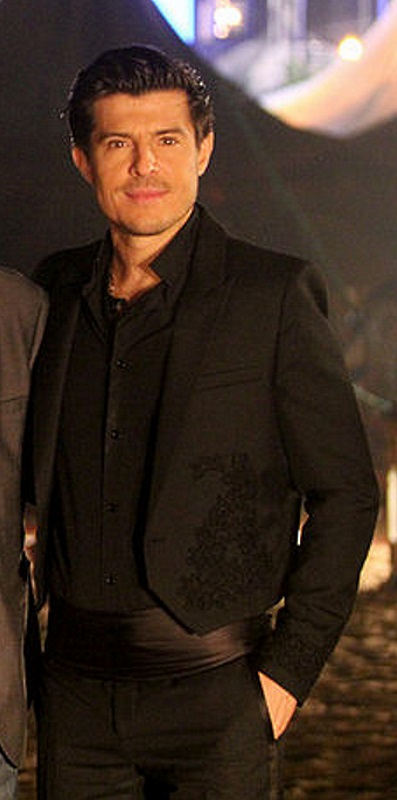

Background information
- Born: 6 January 1975 (age 51); Paris, France
- Genres: classical, Classical crossover, Popera (Operatic pop), French variety
- Occupations: Singer, actor
- Instrument: Vocals
- Website: vincentniclo.com

Vincent Niclo (born in Paris on 6 January 1975) is a French pop opera tenor singer.

== Musical theatre ==
Vincent Niclo comes from a family of artists and was interested in theatre and took courses at the Cours Florent acting school particularly with Raymond Acquaviva. He also followed courses at Simon, trained at Actor Studio, and studied modern dance.

His first role in theatre was in Renaître à Bogota, a play by Marthe Vandenberg. He also acted in a number of television films and series like Sous le soleil, Extrême Limite, Nestor Burma and a role in cinema in Place Vendôme directed by Nicole Garcia.

After meeting Thierry Dran at the Paris Opera, he furthered his singing techniques and ended with a role in the musical Titanic in its French version where he played Jim Farrel, followed by other roles in musicals Tristan and Iseult playing Tristan, double roles as Romeo in Roméo et Juliette, de la Haine à l'Amour and as Rhett Butler in Autant en emporte le vent.

He also developed a solo singing career. Vincent Niclo toured in 2006 giving a series of concerts accompanied by a symphonic orchestra and 150 musicians and choir singers in Night of the Proms and released an album the same year Un nom sur mon visage with moderate success. .

== Vincent Niclo and Red Army Choir MVD ==
Returning to classic music, he sang with Red Army Choir – MVD Ensemble, the official academic ensemble under the Ministry of the Interior. After Vincent Niclo asked Thierry Wolf, the producer of the Ensemble, they went together in Moscow to meet MVD director General Eliseev. Thierry Wolf and Victor Eliseev invited him to join the tour project produced by FGL PRODUCTIONS, for all Red Army Choir in the French leg of the tour in March 2012.

=== Opéra Rouge (France) ===
Vincent Niclo performed every night "Ameno" and "La Marseillaise", both of which appear in album Opéra Rouge released on 24 September 2012, that also include many pop-arrangements of classic arias like Giacomo Puccini's "Nessum Dorma", Carl Orff's "Carmina Burana", Tomaso Albinoni's "Adagio", Lucio Dalla's "Caruso" and Luigi Denza's "Funiculi Funicula". The album was commercially successful, and spent 5 consecutive weeks in Top 5 of French Albums Chart and was certified Platinum on 5 November 2012.

On 10 November 2012, Vincent Niclo sang with the Red Army Choir – MVD Ensemble at the Kremlin in Moscow. The event was organized for Army Day and broadcast on Russian national television. On 24 November 2012 on French TV, Red Army Choir MVD Ensemble and Vincent Niclo interpret "All By Myself" near Celine Dion, for big show to celebrate the release of her new album "No wait". Niclo was invited to open the six concerts that she gave in Paris in November and December 2013. During this period Vincent Niclo and Red Army Choir MVD Ensemble, realized several shows on French TV. As on 4 December 2012, they took part in Noël sous les étoiles French TV special presented by Daniela Lumbroso interpreting "Ameno". It was scheduled for broadcast on France 3 on 21 December 2012.

In March 2013, Vincent Niclo will engage in yet another tour with the Red Army Choir MVD Ensemble with 37 various dates. During the tour, they receive a Triple Platinum Award from hands of producer Thierry Wolf at Zenith of Lille for 300,000 copies sold of Opéra Rouge.

=== O Fortuna (Germany) ===
Collaboration between the Red Army Choir MVD Ensemble and Vincent Niclo carry on with the album O Fortuna produced by Thierry Wolf which proposed Universal Manager to release it in Germany (out on 18 October 2013 in Germany) Deutsche Grammophon.

== Album Luis ==
Vincent Niclo finished a tribute to tenor Luis Mariano. The new album titled Luis was released on 23 September 2013 in France.

== Danse avec les stars ==
- In 2015 he participated in season 6 of Danse avec les stars (the French version of Dancing with the Stars) with his partner Katrina Patchett and finished 7th out of 10 contestants.

This table shows the route of Vincent Niclo and Katrina Patchett in Danse Avec Les Stars.

Week	Dancing style	Music	Judge points				Total	Ranking	Result
Week	Dancing style	Music	Fauve Hautot	Jean-Marc Généreux	Marie-Claude Pietragalla	Chris Marques	Total	Ranking	Result
1	Cha-Cha-Cha	Uptown Funk – Bruno Mars	8	5	8	5	26/40	6/10	No Elimination
2	Foxtrot	Nessun dorma – Luciano Pavarotti	8	6	8	7	29/40	5=/10	Safe
1+2	Foxtrot	Nessun dorma – Luciano Pavarotti	8	6	8	7	55/80	5/10	Safe
3	Tango	Here Comes the Rain Again – Eurythmics	7 + 7	7 + 6	7 + 8	7 + 6	55/80	4/9	Safe
4	Cancelled due to November 2015 Paris attacks								
5	Jive	"Jailhouse Rock" – Elvis Presley	8 + 7	8 + 5	8 + 7	8 + 6	57/80	6/8	Safe
6	Quickstep Samba relay (+15 points)	Aladdin's song The Bare Necessities	7 + 8	8 + 7	9 + 8	8 + 8	78/120	5/7	Eliminated

== Shows ==
- 2001 / 2002: Titanic as Jim Farrel (French version at Opéra Royal de Wallonie and Opéra d’Avignon)
- 2002: West Side Story as Tony (at Halle aux Grains in Toulouse)
- 2002: Les Liaisons Dangereuses (at Valmont) – Only on CD. The show itself did not materialize
- 2002: Tristan et Iseult as Tristan (Only the initial promotional shows)
- 2002: Roméo et Juliette, de la haine à l'amour as Romeo and double of Romeo
- 2003 / 2004: Autant En Emporte Le Vent as Rhett Butler

== Tours ==
- 2006: Night of the Proms (touring France and Belgium)
- 2012: Touring with Red Army Choir (Chœurs de l'Armée rouge) in France and other countries
- 2013: Touring with Red Army Choir (Chœurs de l'Armée rouge) in France and other countries
- 2013: First Part Of Celine Dion with Red Army Choir (Chœurs de l'Armée rouge) in Antwerp and Paris
- 2018–2019: Touring with Sarah Brightman on her Hymn World Tour.

== Discography ==
=== Albums ===
Year	Album	Peak positions				Certification
Year	Album	FRA	BEL (Fl)	BEL (Wa)	SWI	Certification
2006	Un nom sur mon visage	142	—	—	—	
2012	Opéra rouge (Vincent Niclo & Les Chœurs de l'Armée Rouge)	4	—	8	—	
2013	Luis	3	177	7	—	
2014	Ce que je suis	11	—	11	36	
2016	5.Ø	7	—	5	31	
2018	Tango	13	—	10	45	
2019	Tenor	16	—	9	—	
2020	Esperanto (with Les Prêtres Orthodoxes)	6	—	10	56	
2023	Opéra celte	—	—	5	73	

=== Live albums ===
Year	Album	Peak positions	Certification
Year	Album	FRA	Certification
2015	Vincent Niclo au Châtelet – Premier rendez-vous Live	26	

=== Compilation albums ===
- 2018: An Evening with Vincent Niclo (compilation album)
- 2021: 10 Ans Deja

=== Singles ===
Year	Single	Peak positions	Certification	Album
Year	Single	FRA	Certification	Album
2003	"Libres" (Laura Presgurvic & Vincent Niclo)	87		
2005	"Si le temps"	58		
2006	"À force de toi"	74		
2007	"Toute la place"	26		
2012	"Ameno" (Vincent Niclo & Les Chœurs de l'Armée Rouge)	87		
2013	"Besame Mucho"	182		
2014	"Jusqu'à l'ivresse"	156		
2015	"Pour une fois" (with Anggun)	167		
2016	"Je ne sais pas"	82		
2018	"Sogni" (with Sarah Brightman)			
