= Viktor Yeliseyev =

Major General Viktor Yeliseyev
- Виктор Петрович Елисеев
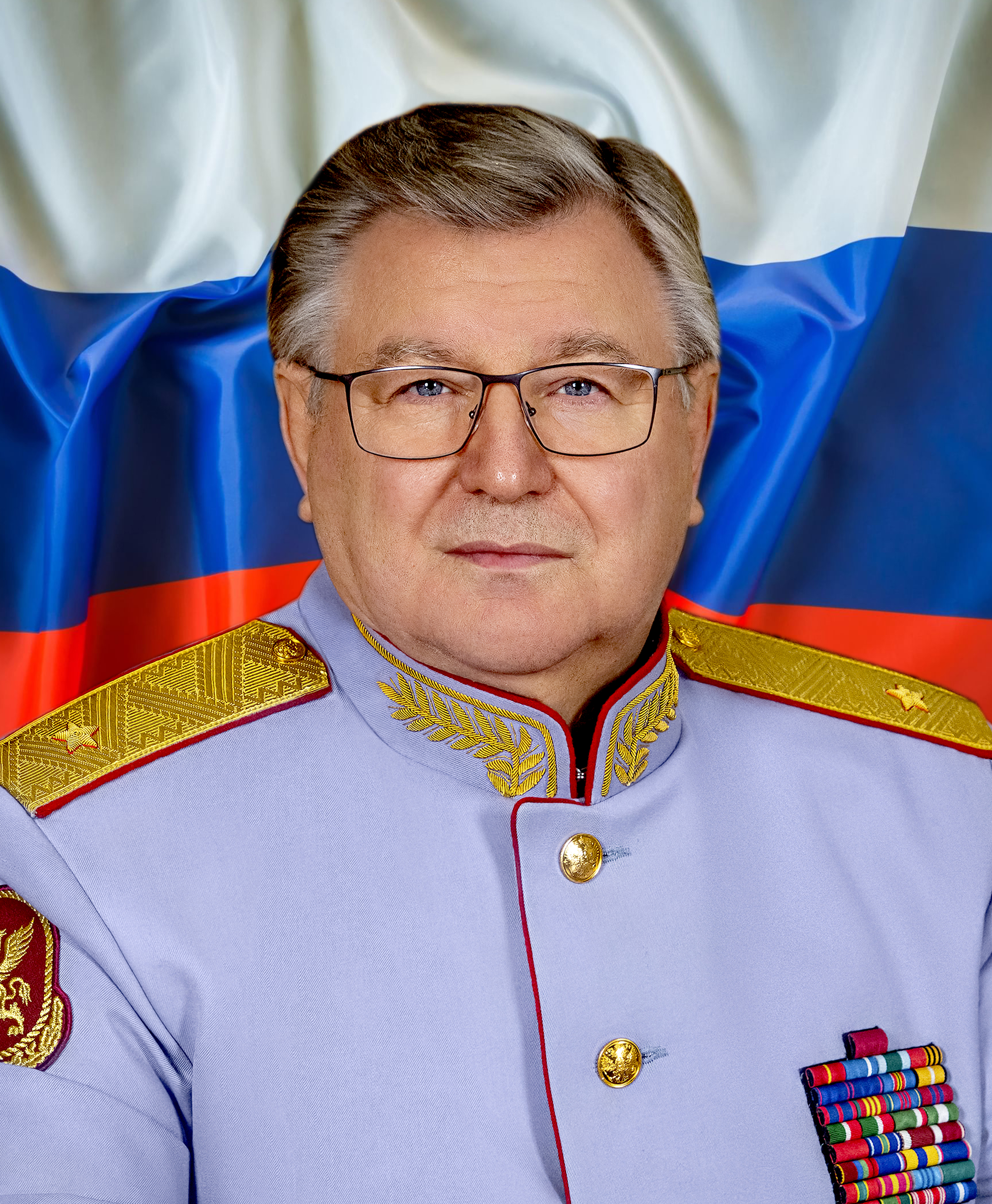
- Viktor Yeliseyev in 2022
- Born: 9 June 1950 (age 76)
- Alma mater: Moscow Schnittke State Institute of Music; Gnessin State Musical College
- Military career
- Allegiance: Russia; USSR
- Branch: Ministry of Interior
- Service years: 1969 - present
- Rank: Major General
- Commands: Rosgvardia Academic Song and Dance Ensemble

Viktor Petrovich Yeliseyev (Russian: Ви́ктор Петро́вич Елисе́ев, born June 9, 1950) is a Russian general, orchestra conductor and music teacher. He is the director of the Rosgvardia Academic Song and Dance Ensemble, one of the two Russian Red Army Choirs.

== Biography ==
Yeliseyev was born in 1950 in Moscow, Russia to Pyotr and Serafima. He graduated the October Revolution Moscow State Institute of Music. He then served as a soldier in the Soviet Ministry of the Interior (1969–1971), after which he became the choirmaster in his former unit. In 1976, Eliseev graduated from the Gnessin State Musical College, specializing in choir conducting.

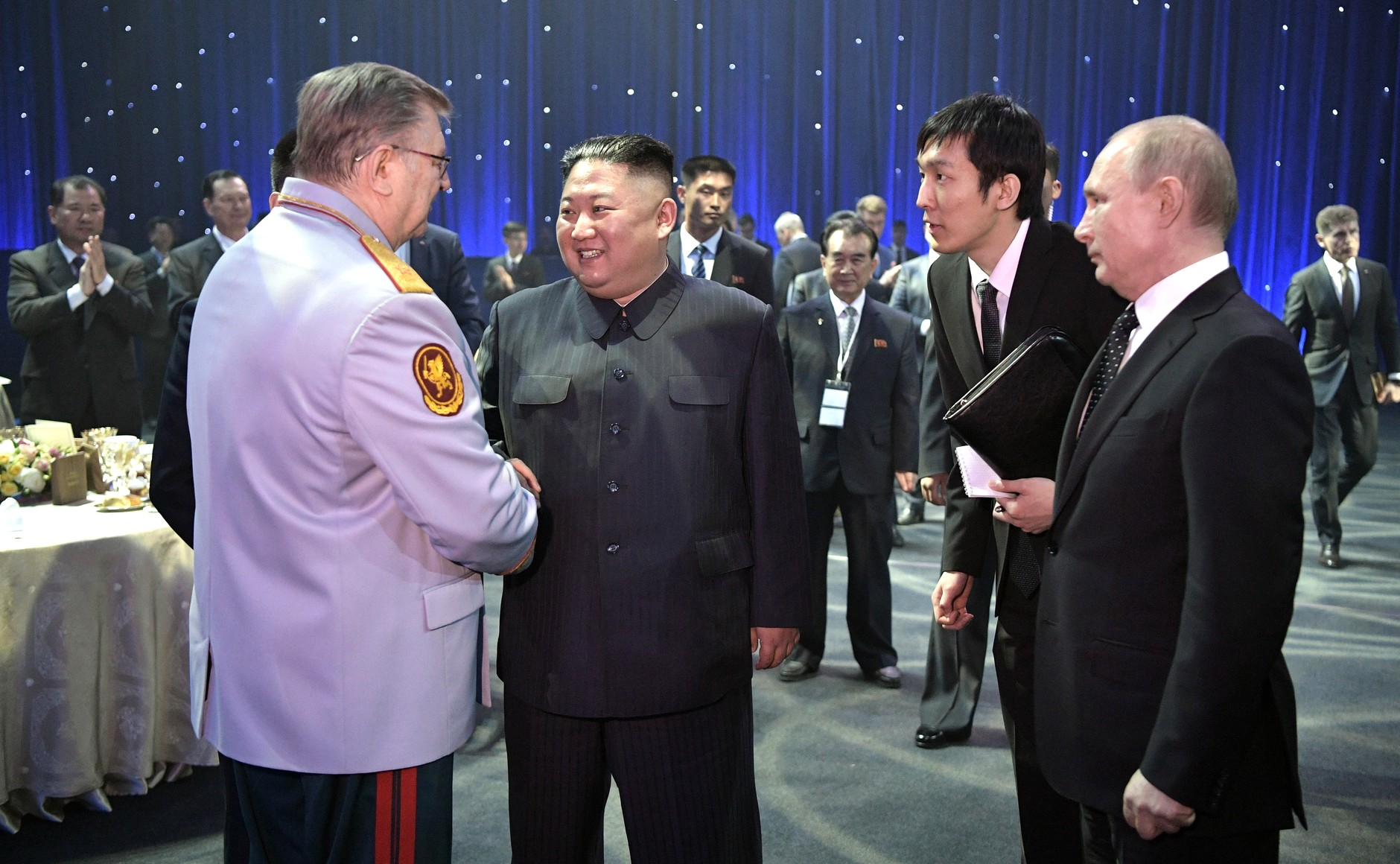
Eliseev with North Korean State Affairs Commission Chairman Kim Jong-un and Russian President Vladimir Putin during the 2019 Russian-North Korean Summit.

Eliseev has been a part of the Ministry of the Interior Ensemble since its founding in 1973, holding various roles. He started out as a choirmaster, becoming the head choirmaster and vice-director in 1977. In 1985 he became the head of the ensemble, and in 1995 also head of the MVD Cultural Center. In 1998 he became a professor in the Moscow Conservatory.

Eliseev has married three times and has two children, one from the first and one from the third marriage. He lives in Moscow. In 2012 he underwent a much-publicized divorce with his then-spouse Irina.

== Performances and work ==
Under Eliseev's direction, the MVD ensemble produced by French impresario Thierry Wolf has performed in various countries, including Bulgaria, Czechoslovakia, Germany, Hungary, North Korea, Italy, Greece, Brazil, Mexico, Switzerland, the UAE, Kuwait, Oman, Qatar, Spain, China, Turkey and Israel. Eliseev was a jury member in the 1999 international soldiers' song contest held in Sochi.

== Awards and honors ==
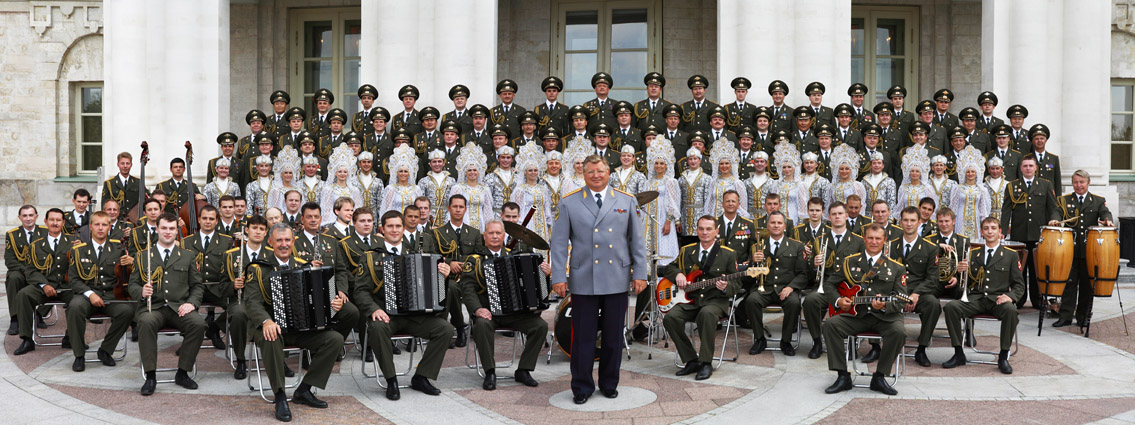
Yeliseyev (front center) with the MVD Ensemble

Eliseev is a People’s Artist of the RSFSR (1988) and a recipient of the Russian Federation Presidential Certificate of Honor.
