= The Three Musketeers: One For All, All For One! =

French musical

The Three Musketeers: One For All, All For One! (translated: Les Trois Mousquetaires: Un Pour Tous, Tous Pour Un!) is a French musical show, directed by René Richard Cyr and Dominic Champagne and produced by Nicole and Gilbert Coullier, Roberto Ciurleo, Eléonore de Galard and NRJ Group, which began its performances on September 29, 2016, at the Palais des Sports in Paris and continue on tour throughout France from February 2017.

== Plot ==
April 1625, the young and brave d'Artagnan leaves his native Gascony to try to join the close guard of King Louis XIII and make his fortune in Paris. Upon his arrival in the capital, d'Artagnan reluctantly challenges the musketeers Athos, Porthos, and Aramis to a duel. He hits Athos' injured shoulder, steps on Porthos' cape and inadvertently compromises Aramis with a handkerchief with the wrong initials.

With Richelieu banning duels, d'Artagnan and the musketeers find themselves outside the law; the guards take advantage of this to try to avenge an old rivalry between them and the three gentlemen. But against all odds, d'Artagnan allies himself with the musketeers and from this victorious fight an unwavering friendship is born.

At Richelieu's suggestion, Louis XIII forces the Queen to wear the twelve diamond studs offered by the King to the next court ball. However, the Machiavellian Richelieu knows that the Queen has given the precious jewelry as a token of love to the Duke of Buckingham, with whom she is having a secret affair.

With the help of the Queen's faithful seamstress, Constance, the quartet saves the Queen from the underhanded maneuvers of Richelieu and his agent, the perfidious Milady de Winter, by going to London to recover the jewelry.

At the end of a journey strewn with pitfalls, d'Artagnan and his three friends manage to deliver the studs to the Queen in time. Promoted to lieutenant, d'Artagnan and the three musketeers succeed in preserving the honor of the kingdom, carried by their only credo: "One for all, all for one! "

== Technical sheet ==
- Title: The Three Musketeers: One For All, All For One!
- Booklet: René Richard Cyr and Dominic Champagne
- Directed by: René Richard Cyr and Dominic Champagne
- Lyrics: Lionel Florence and Patrice Guirao
- Choreography: Yaman Okur
- Musical director: Oliver "Akos" Castelli
- Production: Roberto Ciurleo, Gilbert Coullier, Nicole Coullier, Eléonore De Galard
- Artistic consultant: Brahim Zaibat
- Scenography: Stéphane Roy
- Date of first performance: September 26, 2016, at Dôme de Paris

== Cast ==
- Olivier Dion: d'Artagnan
- Damien Sargue: Aramis
- Brahim Zaibat: Athos
- David Bàn: Porthos
- Victoria Sio: Queen Anne of Austria
- Emji: Milady de Winter
- Megan Lanquar: Constance Bonacieux
- Golan Yosef: Duke of Buckingham
- Christophe Héraut: Cardinal Richelieu
- David-Alexandre Datour (then replaced by Régis Truchy): Planchet
- Antoine Lelandais: Jussac / d'Artagnan's father
- Stéphane Metro (then replaced by Florian Cléret): King Louis XIII / (d'Artagnan's father in the beginning)

== Development ==
After the musical Robin Hood, which was performed in front of more than 800,000 people in France, Roberto Ciurleo, Gilbert Coullier, Nicole Coullier and Eléonore De Galard began working on the musical adaptation of Alexandre Dumas' novel: The Three Musketeers.

On January 31, 2015, a casting call was launched by Bruno Berberes for the roles of Porthos, Aramis, d'Artagnan, Milady de Winter, Queen Anne, Constance, and the Duke of Buckingham. The role of Athos was already assigned to one of the artistic consultants: Brahim Zaibat.

In April 2015, Damien Sargue was chosen to play the role of Aramis, and the rest of the cast was revealed in June.

== Discography ==
=== Singles ===
- The first single was performed by Olivier Dion: Je t'aime c'est tout; it was released on June 15, 2015, was posted on YouTube on June 16, 2015, and an English version was published in October, 2015.
- The second single was performed by Damien Sargue: Un jour; it was released on November 13, 2015, and was posted on YouTube on December 4, 2015.
- The third single was performed by Oliver Dion: De mes propre ailes; it was released on March 28, 2016, and was posted on YouTube on April 27, 2016.
- The fourth single was performed by Damien Sargue: I need love like everyone else; it was released in September 2016, and was posted on YouTube on September 23, 2016.
- The fifth single performed by Victoria Sio: Face à face; it was announced in November 2016. The clip was posted on YouTube on February 7, 2017.

The album sold 30,000 copies.

The deluxe studio album was released on September 30, 2016, and included four new exclusive titles:

- SOS, performed by Olivier Dion.
- For Love, performed by Victoria Sio
- See you in Hell, performed by Emji.
- In you thoughts, performed by Emji and Christophe Héraut.
