= Eliseev =

Eliseev (Russian: Елисе́ев) is a Russian surname. Notable people with the surname include:

- Grigory Eliseev (1821–1891), Russian journalist, editor, and publisher
- Matvey Eliseev (born 1993), Russian biathlete
- Vitali Eliseev (born 1950), Russian rower

== See also ==
- Yeliseyev
- Eliseyev Emporium (Saint Petersburg)
