= Sergei Yeliseyev =

Sergei Yeliseyev may refer to:

- Serge Elisséeff, a Russian, French, and American orientalist
- Sergei Yeliseyev (footballer), a Russian footballer
- Sergei Yeliseyev (admiral), a Ukrainian naval commander who deserted the Ukrainian Navy and sided with Russia
- Sergei Yeliseyev (statesman), a Russian Federal Security Service officer and politician, acting head of Kherson Military-Civilian Administration
