= Olivier Dion =

Canadian singer

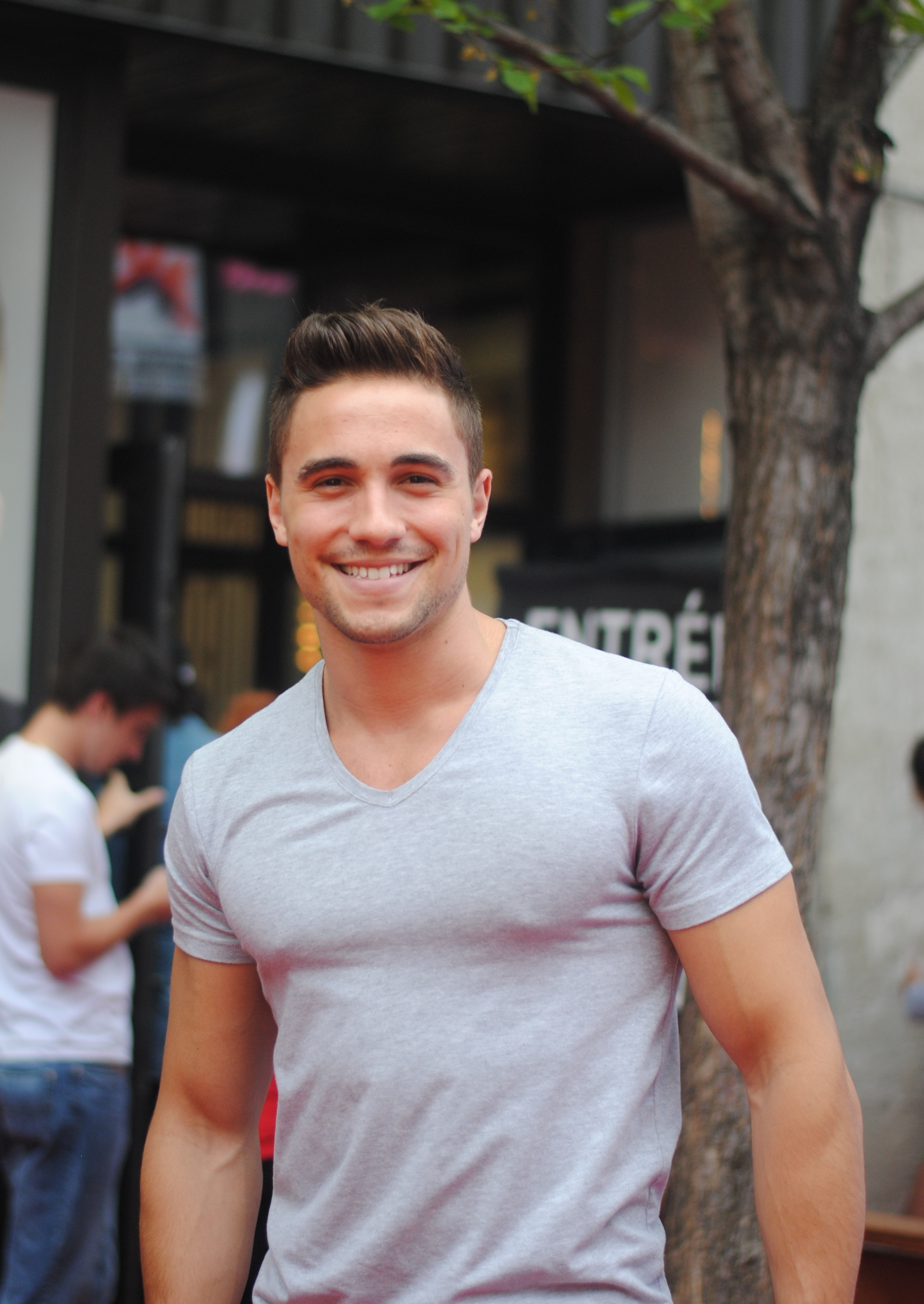

Background information
- Born: August 10, 1991 (age 35)
- Origin: Sherbrooke, Quebec, Canada
- Genres: Pop
- Occupations: Singer; TV host; model
- Instruments: Vocals; bass guitar
- Years active: 2008–present
- Labels: Productions J, Columbia
- Website: olivierdion.com

Olivier Dion (born August 10, 1991) is a Canadian singer who specializes in pop music.

== Career ==
In 2008, Dion, along with Daniel Hamlitsch and Matthew Gaiser, formed the indie rock group Late Young. They released one EP entitled Nativity, of which Dion contributed his vocals alongside the bass guitar.

Dion first came to attention on the reality TV series Star Académie, competing for the title of the best singer. Despite not winning the competition, Dion participated in the Star Académie tour, which had over 130,000 spectators. His song, "Pour exister" on the album, Star Académie 2012 reached double platinum, becoming a hit on Quebec radios.

In the summer of 2013, Dion played Link Larkin in the musical, Hairspray, which was directed by Denise Filiatrault.

On December 1, 2014, Columbia France announced that Dion had signed a licensed contract with the company to develop his European career, and released his single, "Si j'étais son soleil" on European radio the same day.

From February 18-20, 2015, Dion performed an opening act of Véronic DiCaire at the Olympia music hall in Paris, France. On June 11, 2015 he was selected for the role of d'Artagnan in a new musical interpretation of The Three Musketeers at the Palais des Sports in Paris on September 29, 2016, and continue to tour around France until January 2017. One of the first singles Dion sang from the musical, "Je t'aime c'est tout", was launched with a music video on June 16, 2015.

Dion competed in the sixth season of the French show Danse avec les stars. He finished in third place in the final with his partner, Candice Pascal.

On December 24, 2017, he joined the Swedish singer Zara Larsson with the hit single "Only You".

== Discography ==
=== Albums with Star Académie ===
- Star Académie 2012 (160,000 copies sold)
- Star Académie Noël 2012 (80,000 copies sold)

=== Solo albums ===
- Olivier Dion (2014)
- Curious (2018)
- Exposed (2019)
- Sur le fil (2023)

=== Solo singles ===
- 2014: "Si j'étais son soleil"
- 2014: Fou
- 2014: Sortir de l'ombre
- 2014: Presque une chanson d'amour
- 2014: On est les plus forts
- 2018: Curious
- 2019: Kinda Love
- 2019: Feels Right
- 2021: Rendez-vous
- 2022: Vraiment
- 2023: Toujours un Temps
