= Rosgvardia Academic Song and Dance Ensemble =

Official academic ensemble of the Russian National Guard and MVD

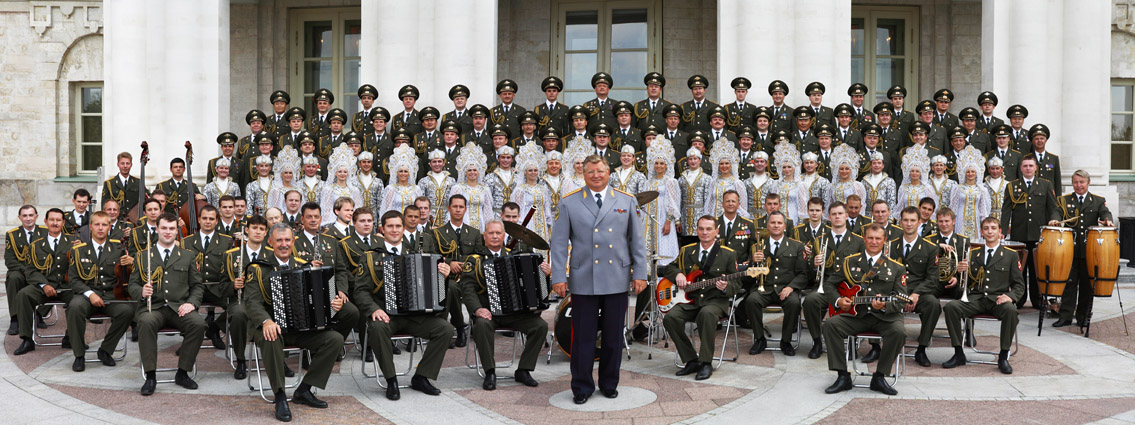
- The ensemble in 2007

Background information
- Also known as: VV MVD Ensemble
- Genres: Classical, folk tunes, hymns, operatic arias, popular music
- Members: Conductor Viktor Yeliseyev
- Website: www.lubyanka13.ru

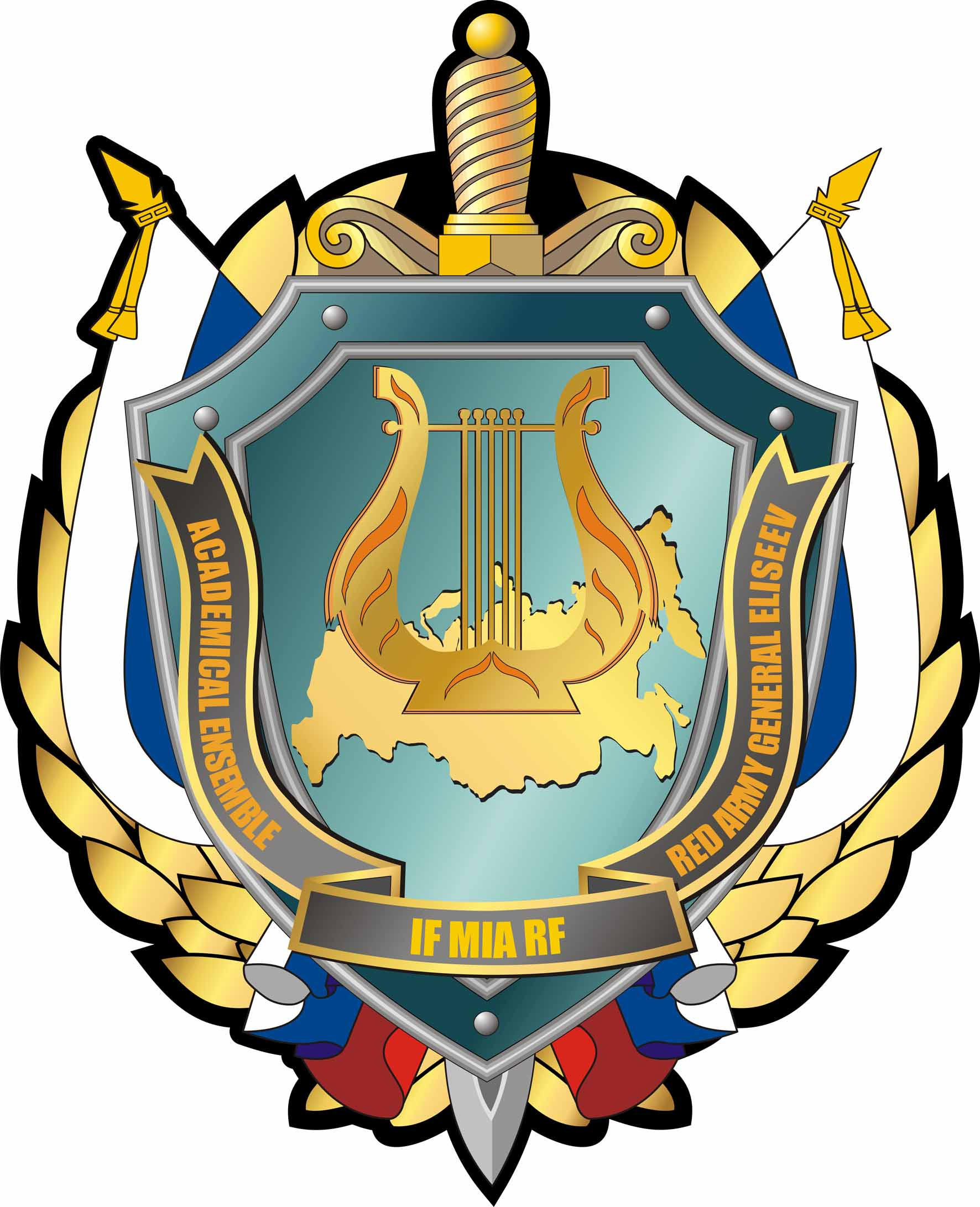
Emblem of the ensemble

The Rosgvardia Academic Song and Dance Ensemble, formerly known as the MVD Ensemble, is an official academic ensemble of the National Guard of Russia (Rosgvardia) and the Ministry of Internal Affairs of the Russian Federation (Russian MVD). Established in 1939, the ensemble carries on the tradition of choirs and ballets of the Soviet Red Army, with singers, musicians and dancers.

== History ==
The MVD Ensemble was born to serve and sustain the Soviet state.

The Alexandrov Ensemble, under the patronage of the Ministry of Defense, was founded in 1928, and The MVD Ensemble under that of the Ministry of Internal Affairs in 1939 but dissolved until 1974.

Ensemble MVD was established in 1939 under the direction of Alexander Vassilivitch. General Victor Eliseev recreated the ensemble in 1974 when he joined as chief of choir, then becoming director of MVD Ensemble in 1985.

Since the 1980s, The Ensemble MVD has performed on all continents after modernizing their repertoire. Ensemble MVD has realized more than seven thousand performances in several languages, and more than 20 million viewers worldwide. In this way, Ensemble MVD met Pope John Paul II in Rome, or opening the 1980 Summer Olympics in Moscow.

In 2014, the MVD Ensemble and Chorus opened the Winter Olympic Games in Sochi, on request of their French producer Thierry Wolf, singing a cover of Daft Punk's "Get Lucky".

== General Viktor Eliseev ==
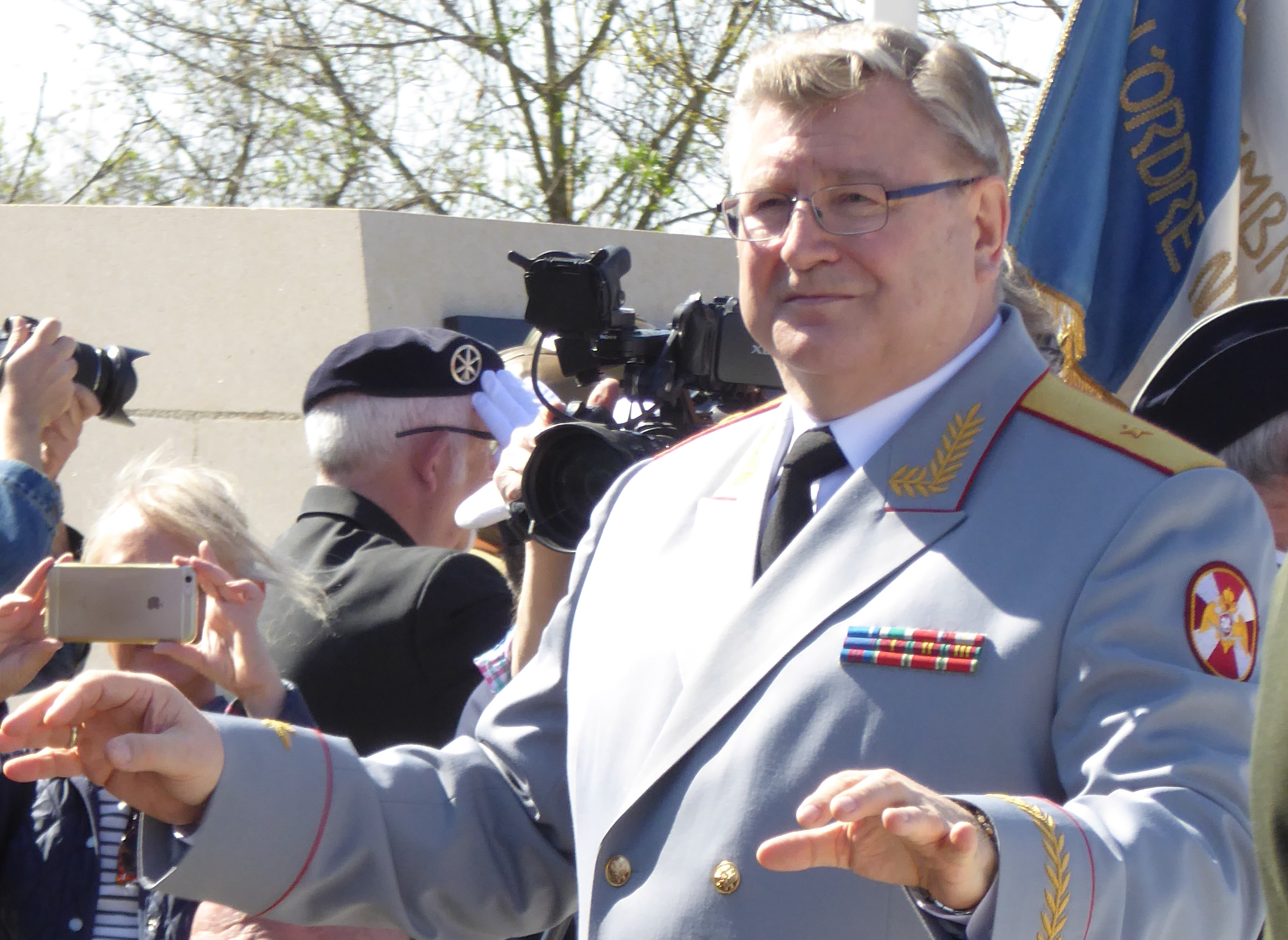
Yeliseyev in 2017

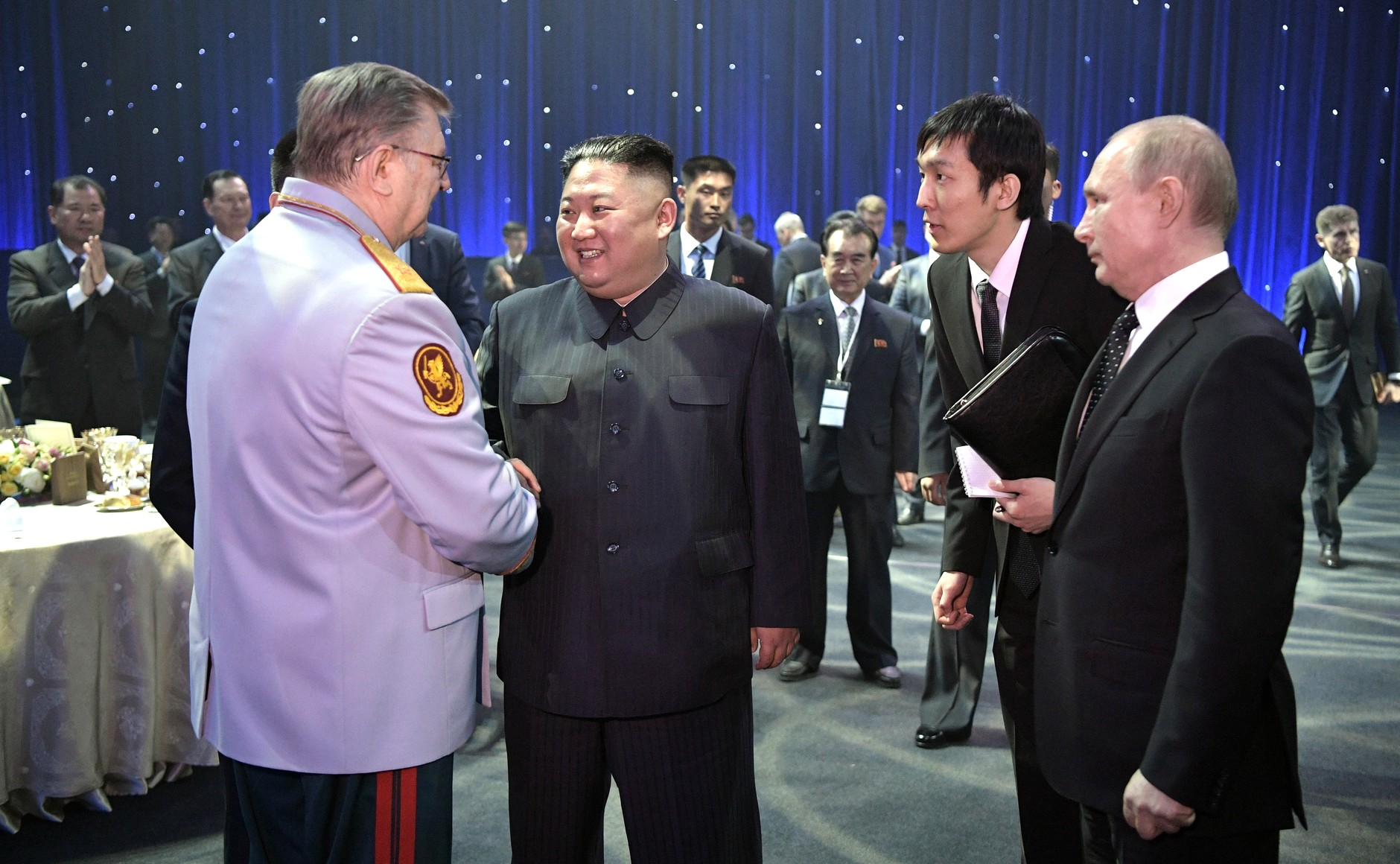
Yeliseyev with North Korean State Affairs Commission Chairman Kim Jong-un and Russian President Vladimir Putin during the 2019 Russian-North Korean Summit.

Viktor Eliseev was born 9 June 1950, in Moscow. He joined the corps of the Ministry of the Interior in 1973, and become director of The MVD Ensemble in 1985.

== Collaborations ==
=== Vincent Niclo ===
The young French tenor Vincent Niclo wanted to record an album of great opera arias. He sent some songs to Thierry Wolf, impresario of the Ensemble MVD, and General Eliseev was interested.

The 2012 album Opera Rouge was rewarded with Triple Platinum Award for 300 000 copies sold.

Niclo was invited to sing with Ensemble MVD at Kremlin in Moscow on 10 November 2012, to the occasion of the anniversary of the Russian Revolution of 1917.

Collaboration between the Ensemble MVD and Niclo continued when Thierry Wolf produced the album O Fortuna in October 2013 in Germany.

=== Julia Migenes ===
During the French issue, 300 choirs for Christmas was broadcast on 25 December 2012, on the French channel TF1, the American soprano Julia Migenes performed with Vincent Niclo and the MVD Ensemble the title "Libiamo" from Verdi's La traviata on the album Opera Rouge.

=== Celine Dion ===
For the release of her new album, Celine Dion broadcast a show on 24 November 2012 on French TV, where she performed her biggest hits with un guests. On this occasion Ensemble MVD and Vincent Niclo interpreted "All by Myself" near her. She invited Niclo to open the seven concerts that she gives in Paris and Anvers in November and December 2013.
