= Moscow Schnittke State Institute of Music =

Education organization in Moscow, Russia

- Московский государственный институт музыки имени А. Г. Шнитке
- Type: Music school
- Established: 1918
- Address: 10 Sokolovskogo str., Moscow, Russia; 55°47′39″N 37°29′10″E
- Language: Russian
- Website: schnittke-mgim.ru

Moscow Schnittke State Institute of Music (Russian: Московский государственный институт музыки имени А. Г. Шнитке, romanized: Moskovskiy gosudarstvennyy institut muzyki imeni A. G. Shnitke) is a music academy in Moscow, Russia.

== History ==
The educational institution was founded in 1918 as the 1st People's Music School, and over time it changed its name: October Revolution Music School.

The origins of the creation of the educational institution were outstanding figures of national musical culture - Boleslav Yavorsky and N. Bryusova (sister of the poet Valery Bryusov).

Konstantin Shchedrin (father of the famous composer Rodion Shchedrin) taught in the institute.

On 13 April 1993 the academy received a university status.

In 1949–1953, Alfred Schnittke studied at the October Revolution Music Academy, and then worked here for some time as a teacher of theoretical disciplines. In 1999, the institute was named after him.

The rector of the institute from 2016 is Anna Schebrakova.
