= Sergei Yeliseyev (footballer) =

Russian footballer

Personal information
- Full name: Sergei Valeryevich Yeliseyev
- Date of birth: 28 May 1972 (age 54)
- Height: 1.85 m (6 ft 1 in)
- Positions: Forward; midfielder

Youth career
- PFC CSKA Moscow

Senior career*
Years	Team	Apps	(Gls)
1989–1991	FC CSKA-2 Moscow	51	(1)
1991	FC Volochanin Vyshny Volochyok	9	(0)
1992	FC Zvezda-Rus Gorodische	3	(0)
1993	FC CSKA-2 Moscow	10	(2)
1993	FC Metallurg Magnitogorsk	28	(3)
1994	FC Dynamo-Gazovik Tyumen	13	(0)
1995	FC Shinnik Yaroslavl	39	(4)
1996	FC Rubin Kazan	25	(3)
1997–1998	FC Samotlor-XXI Nizhnevartovsk	45	(2)
1998	FC Spartak Kostroma	7	(0)
- * Club domestic league appearances and goals

Sergei Valeryevich Yeliseyev (Russian: Сергей Валерьевич Елисеев; born 28 May 1972) is a former Russian football player.
