= Fabienne Carat =

French actress and singer

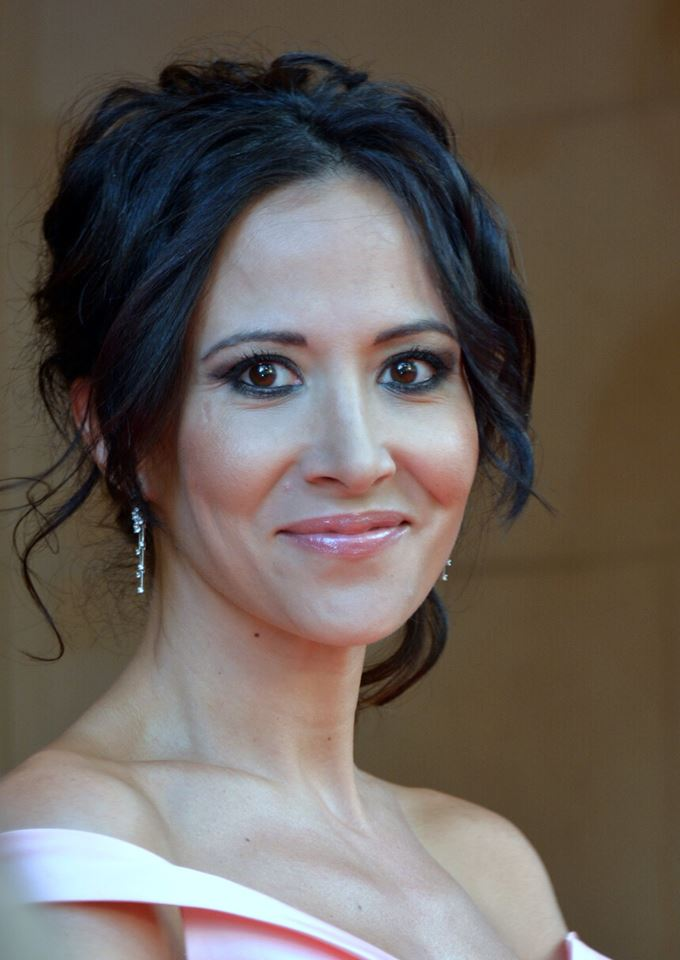
- Carat in 2018.
- Born: 24 August 1979 (age 46); Pau, France
- Occupations: Actress, Singer
- Years active: 2001–present

Fabienne Carat (born 24 August 1979) is a French actress and singer.

== Debut ==
Fabienne Carat began the theater at the age of eleven, then left her family at fifteen to complete five years of hotel studies in Biarritz. Then she settled in Paris at the age of 20 in March 2000.

On December 6, 2021, she gave birth to a daughter, Céleste, whose father's name she did not identify, and who did not acknowledge the child.

== Filmography ==
Year	Title	Role	Director	Notes
2001	La vérité si je mens 2	Uncredited	Thomas Gilou	
2004	Au secours, j'ai 30 ans !	The waitress	Marie-Anne Chazel	
2005	Cheyenne	Madame Stone	Hervé Prat	Short
2005	Bin'o Bine	Meriem	Emmanuel Soler	TV series (1 episode)
2005–2021	Plus belle la vie	Samia Nasri	Roger Wielgus, Philippe Dajoux, ...	TV series (1441 episodes)
2006	Fête de famille	The hostess	Lorenzo Gabriele	TV series (1 episode)
2007	La prophétie d'Avignon	The secretary	David Delrieux	TV series (1 episode)
2007	Ondes de choc	Various	Laurent Carcélès	TV series (2 episodes)
2009	Kill for Love	Inspector Moresco	Jean-Marie Pallardy	
2017	Le secret de l'abbaye	Alicia Tirard	Alfred Lot	TV movie

== Theater ==
Year	Title
2001	Pop corn
2002	Cendrillon
2002	Bistouri & Volupté
2003	Huit femmes
2003	Catégorie 3-1
2003	Sales mômes
2005	La carte postale d'Honfleur
2006-08	Parfum d'engambi
2007-08	Les créateurs
2012-13	10 ans de mariage
2015-17	L'amour est dans le pré

== Discography ==
=== Album ===
- 2011 : DARKPINK
