= Blake Works I =

Ballet by William Forsythe

- Choreographer: William Forsythe
- Music: James Blake
- Premiere: 4 July 2016; Palais Garnier
- Original ballet company: Paris Opera Ballet

Blake Works I is a ballet choreographed by William Forsythe to seven songs from James Blake's album The Colour in Anything. The ballet was made for the Paris Opera Ballet, Forsythe's first work for the company since 1999, and premiered on 4 July 2016, at Palais Garnier.

== Background and production ==
Forsythe choreographed his first ballet for the Paris Opera Ballet in 1983, a ballet titled France Dance. Four years later, he made one of his most notable works, In the Middle, Somewhat Elevated, for the company. His last two works for the company before Blake Works I were made in 1999.

In February 2015, the Paris Opera Ballet announced that Forsythe would become an associate choreographer with the company, and would create a new ballet for the company the following year. It would be both the first large-scale ballet he made for a company other than his own since 1999. Forsythe said he was not planning for a position in a ballet company until Benjamin Millepied, the new director of dance at the Paris Opera contacted him. Forsythe also noted he and Millepied started talking about making a new ballet for the company since Millipied assumed his position.

The ballet uses seven songs from English musician James Blake's album The Colour in Anything, which uses electronic keyboard and syncopated percussion. Forsythe had previously used popular music in Love Songs (1979) and Say Bye Bye (1980). Blake Works I is also Forsythe's first "ballet ballet" in over fifteen years. According to a New York Times profile of Forsythe, he made use of the Paris Opera Ballet's technical heritage, while the use of arms and feet stems from the French ballet style. The ballet is performed by 21 dancers. Twenty of them are in blue practice clothes that resemble the Paris Opera Ballet School's uniform, and the 21st dancer, a man, is in dark jeans and a T-shirt.

== Original cast ==
The principal dancers and soloists at the premiere include:

- François Alu
- Léonore Baulac
- Marion Gautier de Charnacé
- Pablo Legasa
- Germain Louvet
- Hugo Marchand
- Caroline Osmont
- Ludmila Pagliero
- Roxane Stojanov

== Performances ==
Blake Works I premiered on 4 July 2016, at Palais Garnier, as part of a Paris Opera Ballet triple bill that also consisted of two other Forsythe works. However, by the time it premiered, both Forsythe and company director Benjamin Millepied were about to leave the Paris Opera Ballet.

The Boston Ballet, which had a five-year partnership with Forsythe, had the North American premiere of Blake Works I in March 2019. Other ballet companies that have performed the ballet include Stuttgart Ballet, San Francisco Ballet, English National Ballet, Dutch National Ballet, the Ballet of Teatro alla Scala in Milan, Ballet West in Salt Lake City. and Bayerisches Staatsballett in Munich.

== Critical reception ==
Laura Cappelle of the Financial Times commented, "Its modernity doesn't lie in extreme displays, but in the complexity, speed and changing directions of the choreography. Forsythe's vast classical vocabulary puts to shame many ballet choreographers working today: playful references to ballet history abound, alongside rare combinations that speak specifically to the French dancers' articulation and eloquent footwork." Roslyn Sulcas of New York Times wrote that Blake Works I is "a celebration of the youth, spirits, talent and collective knowledge of a new generation of Paris Opera dancers, who have never, in my experience of the company, looked better than they did throughout Monday's performance." She concluded in her review, "It's a love letter to these dancers and to the art of ballet itself."
