= Mathilde Froustey =

French ballet dancer and choreographer

- Born: June 8, 1985 (age 41); Bordeaux, France
- Education: Marseille National School of Ballet; Paris Opera Ballet Dance School
- Occupation: Ballet dancer
- Years active: 2002–present
- Dancing career
- Former groups: San Francisco Ballet, Paris Opera Ballet
- Dances: Don Quixote; La Fille Mal Gardée; Giselle 1st Varna International Ballet Competition gold medal

Mathilde Froustey (born June 8, 1985, in Bordeaux, France) is a French ballet dancer.

She is a principal dancer at San Francisco Ballet. Mathilde Froustey was a "Sujet" soloist of the Paris Opera Ballet until 2013.

== Early life ==
Mathilde Froustey started dancing in 1994, at the age of nine, in Dax in the south of France, as ballet training helped her back problems. Later, in 1998, she trained at the Marseille National School of Ballet. Colette Armand, her ballet teacher in Marseille, recommended she audition for the prestigious Paris Opera Ballet School.

== Paris Opera Ballet ==
Mathilde Froustey started at Paris Opera Ballet School in 1999 and joined Paris Opera Ballet in 2002. She was promoted to the rank of "Coryphée" in 2003.

In 2004, she won the gold medal at the Varna International Ballet Competition with Josua Hoffalt. In 2005, Froustey was promoted to "Sujet", soloist.

Froustey was one of the founding members of 3e étage, an independent group of Paris Opera Ballet dancers directed by Samuel Murez.

She toured in Japan with Manuel Legris as a member of his group Manuel Legris & Friends. Legris was at the time principal dancer ("danseur étoile") of the Paris Opera Ballet.

== Becoming a principal dancer ==
Although Froustey appeared on stage in leading roles with the Paris Opera Ballet as of 2006, particularly as Kitri in Don Quixote, she was not promoted to "Première Danseuse", first soloist, with this company. Artistic director, Brigitte Lefèvre, could not explain why the jury consistently didn’t vote for her. Some ventured that her style was too extroverted and virtuosic for Paris, where restraint and purity are valued.

During her career, Froustey met artistic directors of prestigious ballet companies on several occasions when the directors were in the audience of ballet performances. She was on particularly good terms with Helgi Tómasson and Manuel Legris, who both appreciated her as a soloist.

After he had seen her dancing as Lise in La Fille mal gardée in Paris in July 2012, Manuel Legris offered her a position in the Vienna State Ballet as principal dancer, telling her at the same time to stay at the Paris Opera Ballet a little bit more. Mathilde Froustey didn't wait too long.

She was the first top-notch dancer leaving the Paris Opera Ballet for years.

== San Francisco Ballet ==
In January 2013, Mathilde Froustey accepted an offer from Helgi Tómasson, to become a principal dancer with the San Francisco Ballet.

Mathilde Froustey and Helgi Tómasson met each other already in 2006 at a competition in Paris through José Martinez, danseur étoile of the Paris Opera Ballet.

When she made a long-distance call inquiring about a job there, a contract arrived in the mail a week later. This was the first time that a principal dancer entered the San Francisco Ballet by bypassing the audition process.

== Awards ==
- 2004: Varna International Ballet Competition, gold medal with Josua Hoffalt
- 2007: Ballet2000 dance prize
- 2013: Danza & Danza's best foreign dancer award
- 2015: Isadora Duncan Dance Award for her performances of Giselle with Tiit Helimets
- 2018: Nominated to the Isadora Duncan Dance Award for her performance in Sleeping Beauty (Aurora)

== Repertoire ==
- Kitri in Don Quixote:
- Lise in La Fille Mal Gardée
- Anastasia in "Ivan the Terrible"
- Giselle in Giselle
- Nutcracker (Grand Pas de Deux Ballerina and Sugar Plum Fairy)
- Romeo and Juliet (Juliet)
- Swan Lake (Odette/Odile)
- 7 for Eight
- Caprice
- The Fifth Season
- Prism, and Trio
- Tomasson/Possokhov's Don Quixote (Kitri)
- Cranko's Onegin (Tatiana)
- Balanchine's Allegro Brillante, Brahms-Schoenberg Quartet, Rubies, Serenade, and Theme and Variations
- Gsovsky's Grand Pas Classique
- Lifar's Suite en Blanc
- Makarova's (after Petipa) “The Kingdom of the Shades” from La Bayadère, Act II (1st Solo Shade)
- Ratmansky's From Foreign Lands, Seven Sonatas, Shostakovich Trilogy, and Souvenir d’un lieu cher
- Robbins’ Dances at a Gathering (Yellow and Purple) and In the Night
- Wheeldon's Within the Golden Hour.

== See also ==
- Paris Opera Ballet
