= 3e étage =

French dance company

3e étage (from the French 'Third Floor') is a dance company founded in 2004 by dancer-choreographer Samuel Murez, and based in Paris, France. 3e étage dancers are all members of the Paris Opera Ballet, but the administrative and artistic direction are entirely independent from that company. 3e étage receives no subsidies, and operates entirely on income from performance sales to theaters, ticket sales of self-produced performances, and the support of private benefactors.

== History ==
3e étage's first performance took place on May 28, 2006, in Vieux-Boucau-les-Bains, France.
The cast was composed of: Mathilde Froustey, Josua Hoffalt, Florian Magnenet, Yong-Geol Kim, Muriel Zusperreguy, Ludmila Pagliero, and Samuel Murez.

Of these, three later became principal dancers and two first soloists.

Notable performances and invitations include:

- Sagunto en Escena, Spain, 2008
- Jardins del Cap Roig, Spain, 2009
- Festival des Arts de Saint Sauveur, Canada, 2011
- Ted Shawn Theater, Jacob's Pillow Dance Festival, Massachusetts, US 2011 (6 performances)
- Teatre Coliseo, Buenos Aires, Argentina, 2012 (2 performances)
- Ted Shawn Theater, Jacob's Pillow Dance Festival, Massachusetts, US 2013 (6 performances)
- André Malraux Theater, Rueil-Malmaison, France 2013 (5 performances)

3e étage was also featured in the 2012 video advertisement for the perfume Interlude, by Amouage.

== Artistic Direction ==
Samuel Murez has been artistic director of 3e étage since its founding.
A director is credited for each show, separately from the general artistic direction of the company.

As artistic director of 3e étage, Murez has stated that he sees his primary role as fostering a specific creative culture, in which:

- new work grows from a long-term shared intimacy between members of the group who each bring their various talents, personalities, and ideas to the table
- work both old and new evolves continually over time, even years after its premiere
- all work is many-layered, with the superficial layers being immediately accessible and enjoyable to younger or less experienced viewers, and more complex elements rewarding multiple viewings, or the more experienced eye
- the group's work, on- and offstage, brings people together, regardless of their profession and/or background. 3e étage projects are meant to stimulate encounters and dialogue
- 3e étage puts on very high-quality shows, in return for which the audience is willing to pay a fair price. This is not a mainstream approach in France, where generous government subsidies for culture are meant to enable very low ticket prices.
- 3e étage innovates as much in all aspects of its activities as much as it does in the rehearsal studio
- 3e étage provides a helpful framework for all members of the group (artistic, technical, administrative, or other) to develop their specific talents and capabilities over time, and accompanies them throughout the different phases of their careers

== Programming ==
From 2006 to 2009, 3e étage performances included work by a variety of choreographers alongside Murez's own: George Balanchine, William Forsythe, Edouard Lock, Roland Petit, Jiri Bubenicek, José Martinez, Ben van Cauwenbergh, Richard Siegal.

3e étage also produced performances by directors other than Samuel Murez. In 2011, 3e étage produced the show "Carte Blanche à Agnes Letestu", which was artistically directed by Paris Opera Ballet "Étoile" (Principal dancer) Agnès Letestu. This program was also performed in 2012, in Le Bouscat, France.

Starting in 2011, most 3e étage performances featured one full-length work created by Murez, divided into a series of scenes of various lengths, tied together by overarching themes, motifs, and recurring characters.

These included "Désordres" (Disorders), and its sequel "Le Pillow Thirteen" (created for the 2013 tour to Jacob's Pillow Dance Festival, later performed in France as "Dérèglements") In 2014, 3e étage announced two new programs to be premiered during the 2014–2015 season:

- "Tchaikovski : Récits du Royaume des Songes" to be directed by 3e étage founding member and Paris Opera Ballet Étoile Josua Hoffalt
- "François Alu & les danseurs de l'Opéra de Paris" to be directed by Paris Opera Ballet "Premier Danseur" (first soloist) François Alu

== Audience and critical response ==
=== United States ===
Two week-length 3e étage tours Jacob's Pillow Dance Festival (2011 and 2013) were entirely sold out, with the press universally praising the exceptionally high quality of the dancing, and noting the enthusiasm of the audience response.

=== Europe ===
3e étage performances are praised by the press, with Samuel Murez being described by Paris Match as"the Chaplin of dance", but writings about the company's performances regularly express puzzlement about 3e étage's artistic model and long-term development goals, questioning the low number of performances, the slow speed of creation of new work, and Murez's decision to continue working only with Paris Opera Ballet dancers. Many reviewers expressed frustration that new scenes of "Le Rêveur" (the Dreamer), the prologue of which was presented at the Paris Opera Bastille Amphitheater in February 2013, were not presented in subsequent shows.

== Members ==
3e étage does not self-describe as a dance company. All self-published materials refer to it as a "group", and it does not publish a list of current members. In materials published by third parties, it is described as a "company" or "troupe".
Dancers participating in the company's performances during the 2013–2014 season included:
Josua Hoffalt, François Alu, Lydie Vareilhes, Léonore Baulac, Laura Hecquet, Takeru Coste, Niccolo Balossini, Hugo Vigliotti.
