= Elsa Bois =

French dancer (born 2000)

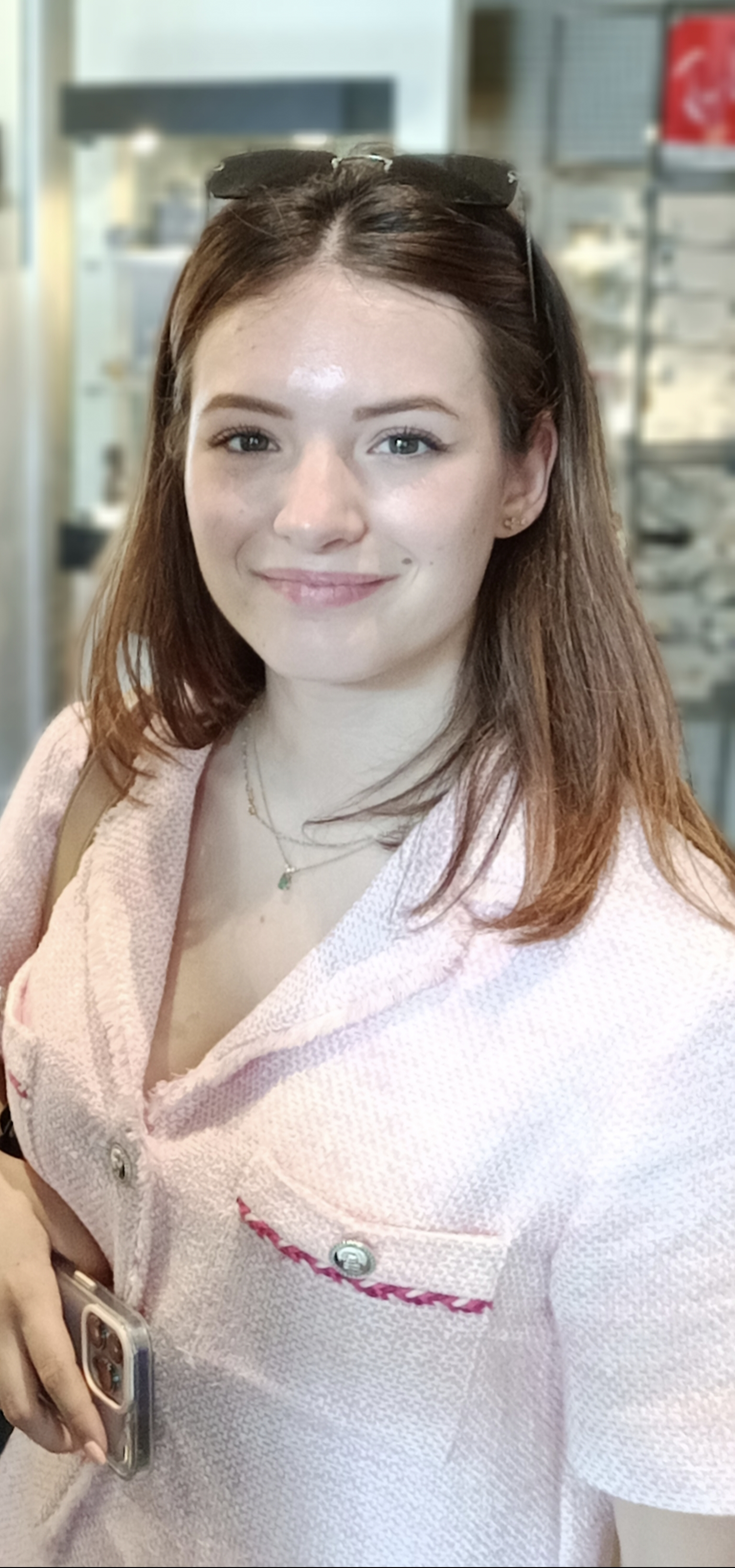
- Elsa Bois in 2023.
- Born: Elsa Émilie Bois; July 22, 2000 (age 25)
- Years active: 2011–present
- Height: 1.66 m (5 ft 5 in)

Signature
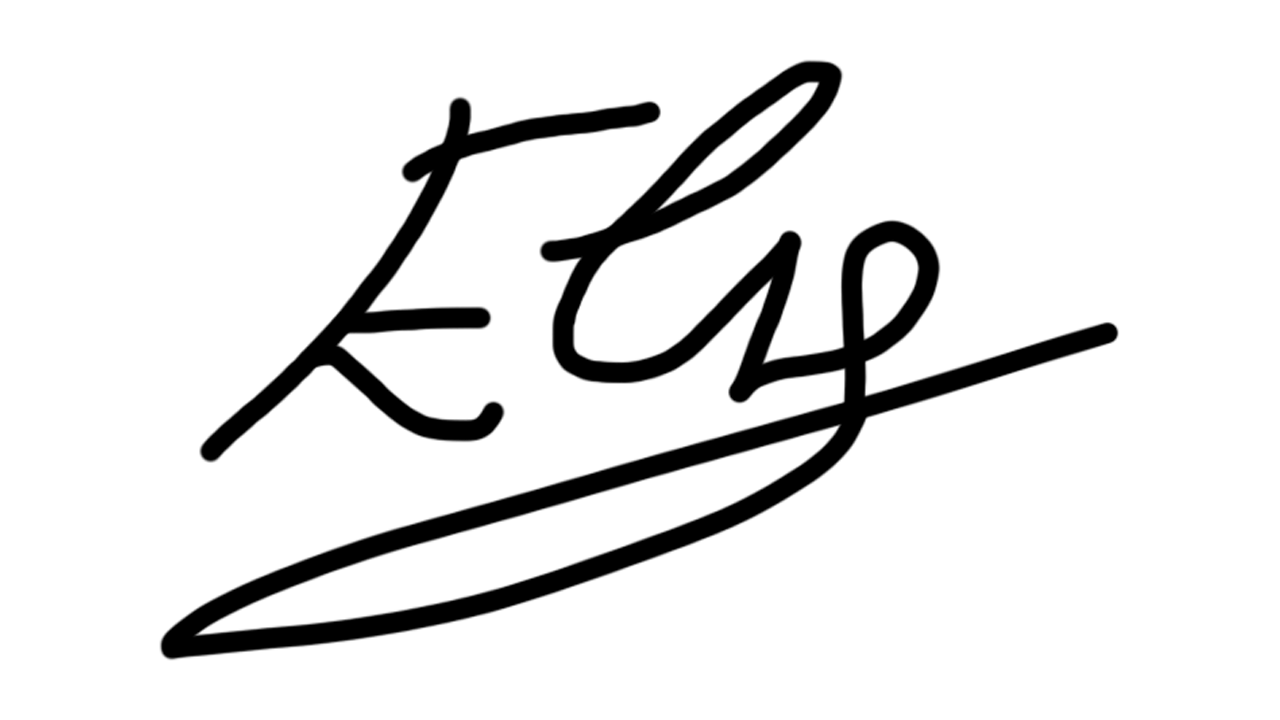

Elsa Bois (born July 22, 2000) is a French dancer and choreographer. She is mainly known for her participation in the TV show Danse avec les stars in 2021 on TF1.

== Childhood and education ==
Originally from Romans-sur-Isère (Drôme), Elsa grew up in a family of dancers. Her mother, Laurie Bois, was a dancer herself. Today, she is a dance costume designer. It is therefore quite natural that Elsa took her first steps on the dance floor at the age of five in Latin dance at the Artistique Rumba Club in Romans-sur-Isère (Drôme). She has two little sisters (Alizée and Lilou Bois) who are also dancers.

She starts competitions with her partner Quentin Chippaux with whom she dances until 2014. The same year, she obtains her national diploma of the patent at the Claude Debussy college.

In 2014, Elsa joined the prestigious CVDS (Club Villeurbannais de Danse Sportive) held by Diana Lacroix Ribas in Villeurbanne and began a new partnership with Djoe Del Sindaco, a partnership that will end in 2016.

In 2017, Elsa's new partner is Raphael Provitera, with whom she reaches the finals of many prestigious competitions in the adult category, including the French Latin Dance Championship in 2019. Their partnership ends that same year.

Since 2020, Elsa has been dancing with Pere Garau Álvarez from Spain.

After passing a Scientific Baccalaureate with a "Very Good" mention in 2017, she leaves the family home to settle in Villeurbanne. Elsa did a first year in medical studies and then studied at the La Doua campus. She holds a STAPS degree in Adapted Physical Activities and Health since July 2021.

Since 2018, she is a dance teacher in leisure and competition, notably at the Ribas dance school in Villeurbanne.

== Qui sera le meilleur ce soir ? (Spéciale enfants) ==
In 2011, aged 10, Elsa wins Qui sera le meilleur ce soir ? (Spéciale enfants), broadcast on TF1, accompanied by her dance partner, Quentin Chippaux. They are coached by Grégoire Lyonnet, winner of season 4 of Danse avec les stars.

== Danse avec les stars ==
In 2012, she was selected with other children to participate in a dance tableau alongside Emmanuel Moire and Fauve Hautot during a prime time of season 3 of Danse avec les stars. In September 2021, Elsa joined the cast of the eleventh season of the TF1 show Danse avec les stars, as a dancer alongside video artist Michou. They finished third in the competition.

In September 2022, she participates in season 12, still as a dancer, alongside Thomas Da Costa.

== Danse avec les Stars ==
Season	Partner	Notability (known for)	Place	Average (/40)
11	Michou	YouTuber	3rd	27.55
12	Thomas Da Costa	Actor	4th	24.88
13	Black M	Rapper	7th	25.33

== Private life ==
In 2010, Elsa's little sister, Alizée Bois, won the show La France a un Incroyable Talent.

On January 3, 2022, Elsa and Michou announced in an Instagram post that they are in a relationship which ended on February 17, 2025.

== Recognitions ==
Elsa counts five titles of champion of France of Latin dances. She obtained her first title of champion of France at the age of 8 years with Quentin Chippaux. The two young dancers obtained their last title in 2014 in Bagnols-sur-Cèze.

They represented France at the World Latin Dance Championship in the Juniors II category (under 16 years old) in 2012 in Kistelek organized by the WDSF, as well as in 2013 in Bassano del Grappa and in 2014 in Moscow.

With Djoe Del Sindaco, Elsa reached the 3rd place at the French Championship in 2015 and in 2016 in the Youths category (under 18). Both represent France at the European Championship in 2016 in Cambrils.
