= Léonore Baulac =

French ballet dancer (born 1990)

- Born: 10 May 1990 (age 36); Paris, France
- Education: Paris Opera Ballet School
- Occupation: ballet dancer
- Years active: 2008–present
- Career
- Current group: Paris Opera Ballet

Léonore Baulac (born 10 May 1990) is a French ballet dancer. She is an étoile at the Paris Opera Ballet.

== Early life ==
Baulac was born in Paris to a Norwegian-born mother. When Baulac was ten, she did not participate in the entrance exam to the Paris Opera Ballet School. She only decided to pursue a career in ballet a year later, but could not enter the school at that time as she was too old. Therefore, she trained with a private teacher. At age 13, she started training at Conservatoire de Paris. She learned contemporary dance there. In 2005, at age 15, Baulac finally entered Paris Opera Ballet School as a paying student.

== Career ==
In 2008, Baulac joined the Paris Opera Ballet's corps de ballet. She only had a handful of opportunities during her first few years in the company. She also danced with Samuel Murez's 3e étage. In 2014, when she was considering leaving the company, she was promoted to coryphée. She was trained by Aurélie Dupont for her coryphée exam. Benjamin Millepied became the artistic director later that year, and Baulac was immediately cast in The Nutcracker. She was promoted to sujet in 2015 and première danseuse a year later. In 2016, Baulac was assigned to understudy Odette/Odile in Swan Lake, and replaced an injured dancer on 31 December. After her performance, Dupont, now the artistic director, promoted Baulac to étoile on stage. She has danced roles such as Kitri in Don Quixote, Juliet in Romeo and Juliet and The Sylph in La Sylphide. She also created roles for William Forsythe's Blake Works I and Crystal Pite's Body and Soul.

== Selected repertoire ==
Baulac's repertoire with the Paris Opera Ballet includes:

- Odette/Odile and Pas de trois in Swan Lake
- Lise in La Fille mal gardée
- La Valse
- "Emeralds" and "Rubies" from Jewels
- The Chosen One in Le Sacre du Printemps
- Olga in Onegin
- Marguerite Gautier and Olympia in La Dame aux camélias
- Kitri in Don Quixote
- The Sylph and Effie in La Sylphide
- Afternoon of a Faun
- The title role in Paquita
- Clara in The Nutcracker
- Juliet in Romeo and Juliet
- Clear, Loud, Bright, Forward
- Polyphonia
- Alea Sands
- Verklärte Nacht
- La Nuit s’achève
- Blake Works I
- Sleight of Hand
- Body and Soul
