= Petrenko =

Petrenko (Ukrainian: Петренко) is a patronymic surname of Slavic origin derived from the first name Petro (the Ukrainian equivalent of Peter) and effectively means of Peter/Peter's. Notable people with the surname include:

- Aleksandr Petrenko (born 1983), Russian triple jumper
- Aleksei Petrenko (1938–2017), Soviet and Russian actor
- Alexander Petrenko (1976–2006), Russian basketball player
- Artyom Petrenko (born 1986), Russian footballer
- Dmitri Petrenko (born 1966), Russian footballer and coach
- Igor Petrenko (born 1977), Russian actor of cinema and theater
- Igor Petrenko (wrestler) (born 1967), Belarusian wrestler
- Ihor Petrenko (born 1938), Ukrainian pole vaulter
- Iryna Petrenko (born 1992), Ukrainian biathlete
- Jared Petrenko (born 1989), Australian rules footballer
- Kirill Petrenko (born 1972), Russian-Austrian conductor
- Maksym Petrenko (1983–2022), Ukrainian writer, inventor, soldier
- Maksym Petrenko (climber) (1978–2024), Ukrainian rock climber
- Mikhail Petrenko (born 1976), Russian opera singer
- Mykhailo Petrenko (1817–1863), Ukrainian romantic poet
- Pavlo Petrenko (born 1979), Ukrainian politician, jurist, lawyer
- Petro Petrenko (1890–1921), Ukrainian military commander
- Pola Petrenko (born 1997), French actress
- Roman Petrenko (born 1964), Russian businessman
- Sergei Petrenko (born 1968), Ukrainian-Russian ice hockey player
- Sergei Petrenko (footballer) (born 1955), Russian footballer
- Serhiy Petrenko (born 1956), Ukrainian canoeist
- Stepan Petrenko (1922–1984), Ukrainian sniper, Hero of the Soviet Union
- Svetlana Petrenko (born 1974), Moldovan chess player
- Vadimas Petrenko (born 1974), Lithuanian footballer
- Valentina Petrenko (born 1955), Russian politician
- Vasily Petrenko (born 1976), Russian-British conductor
- Viktor Petrenko (born 1969), Ukrainian figure skater
- Vladimir Petrenko (born 1971), Ukrainian figure skater
