= Danse avec les stars season 12 =

Season of French television series

Danse avec les stars
- Season 12
- Celebrity winner: Billy Crawford
- Professional winner: Fauve Hautot
- No. of episodes: 10

Release
- Original network: TF1
- Original release: 9 September – 11 November 2022

Season chronology
- ← Previous; Season 11 Next → Season 13

The twelfth season of Danse avec les stars (the French version of Strictly Come Dancing) premiered in September 2022 on TF1, hosted by Camille Combal.

== Around the Show ==
=== Host ===
Camille Combal returns as the host of the show for the fourth year.

=== Jury ===
Chris Marques will return as the only remaining judge from previous seasons. as well as Paris Opera dancer François Alu. The third judge will be singer-songwriter and season 11 runner-up Bilal Hassani, replacing Jean Paul Gaultier, and the fourth judge will be Paris Opera ballet dancer Marie-Agnès Gillot replacing Denitsa Ikonomova.

=== Dancers ===
Denitsa Ikonomova, 4 Times winner & juror in The previous season, announced her withdrawal due to a busy schedule. Christian Millette, dancer since the third season and Maxime Dereymez, dancer since the first season and winner of the second season, Joël Luzolo and Coralie Licata, who debuted in the previous season also announced their departures.

Katrina Patchett, who was absent from the previous season announced her return for season 12 on July 31, 2022.

Marie Denigot who was absent from the previous two seasons announced on August 4, 2022. She was originally planning to return, but ultimately did not because her partner canceled his participation. Frankie Muniz, a comedian who played Malcolm in Malcolm in the Middle and finalist of the twenty-fifth season of the American version in 2017, departed from the series due to health-related problems.

=== Things To Know ===
The first week will be pre-recorded and divided in two shows just like last year only 6 contestants will compete for each group

It means that On September 9 will be performing : Anggun, Thomas Da Costa, David Douillet, Amandine Petit, Billy Crawford and Eva Queen

For the second part who will be aired on September 16 are competing : Carla Lazzari, Clémence Castel, Florent Peyre, Léa Elui, Stéphane Legar and Théo Fernandez

David Douillet has the second most important difference of height and weight (6 feet 3) and 264 lbs previously Camille Lacourt from Danse avec les stars (season 8) hold that record (6 feet 5 and 187 lbs)

Carla Lazzari became the first female minor contestant to reach the finals. The first male was Lenni-Kim on Danse avec les stars (season 8)

Because Clémence Castel came out in 2021, she will be the first female contestant to dance with a woman.

Anggun and Billy Crawford are the first contestants ever in the whole French franchise show of Asian descent

Anggun was asked to compete on Danse avec les stars (season 6) but refuses

The older sister of Eva Queen Jazz Correia was supposed to compete on the previous season she will appear as a guest on week 4

== Participants ==
Celebrity	Known for	Partner	Status
David Douillet	Retired judoka and politician	Katrina Patchett	Eliminated 1st on 9 September 2022
Théo Fernandez	Actor and comedian	Alizée Bois	Eliminated 2nd on 16 September 2022
Clémence Castel	Koh-Lanta winner and television personality	Candice Pascal	Eliminated 3rd on 23 September 2022
Eva Queen	Singer	Jordan Mouillerac	Eliminated 4th on 30 September 2022
Amandine Petit	Miss France 2021	Anthony Colette	Eliminated 5th on 7 October 2022
Anggun	Singer-songwriter	Adrien Caby	Eliminated 6th on 14 October 2022
Florent Peyre	Comedian and actor	Inès Vandamme	Eliminated 7th on 21 October 2022
Léa Elui	Social media influencer	Christophe Licata; Jordan Mouillerac (Week 5, 8)	Eliminated 8th on 28 October 2022
Thomas Da Costa	Actor	Elsa Bois	Eliminated 9th on 4 November 2022
Stéphane Legar	Model and singer	Calisson Goasdoué; Candice Pascal (Week 5-7)	Third Place on 11 November 2022
Carla Lazzari	Singer	Pierre Mauduy	Runner up on 11 November 2022
Billy Crawford	Actor, singer and television presenter	Fauve Hautot	Winners on 11 November 2022

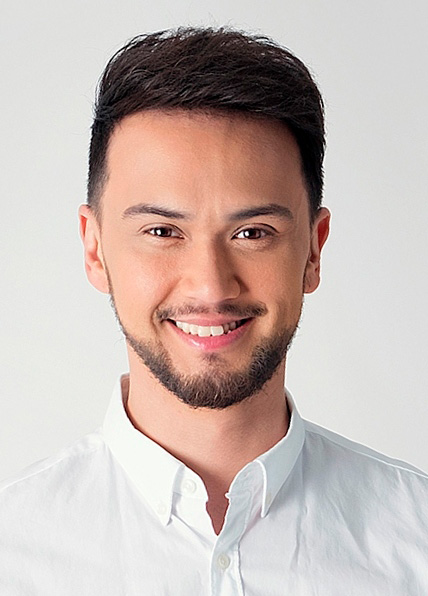
Billy Crawford

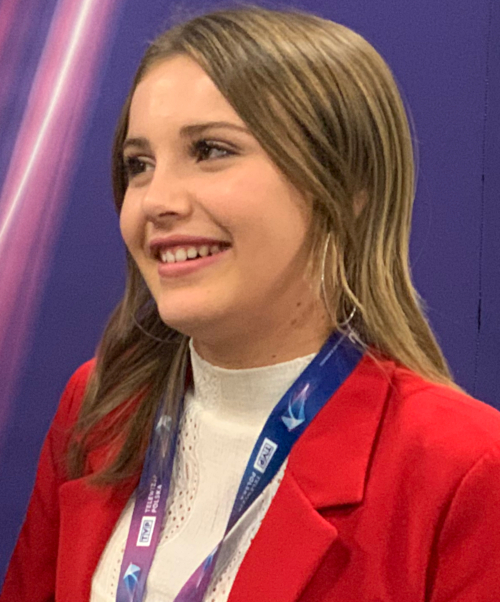
Carla Lazzari

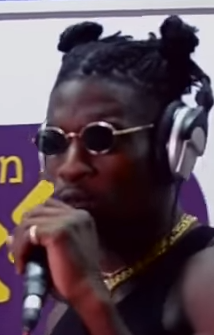
Stéphane Legar

Léa Elui

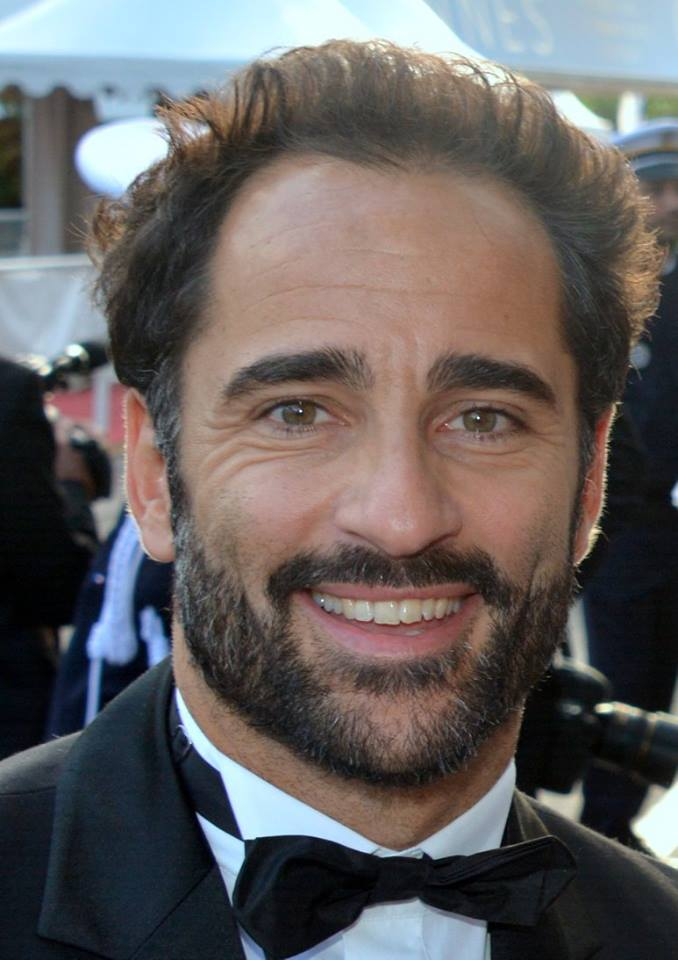
Florent Peyre

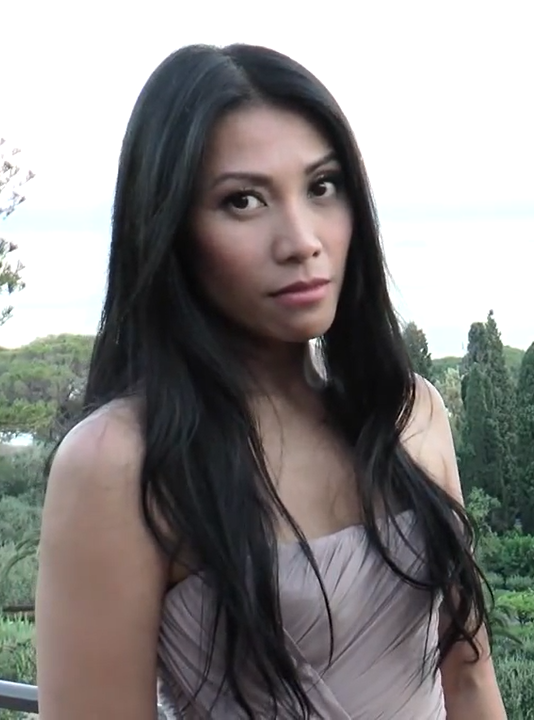
Anggun

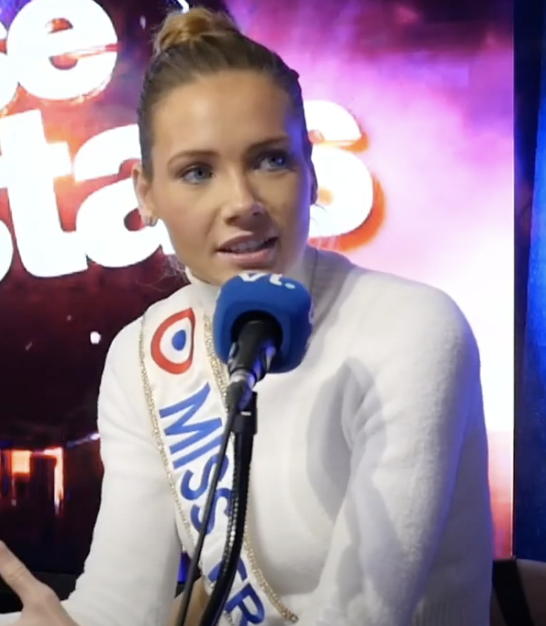
Amandine Petit

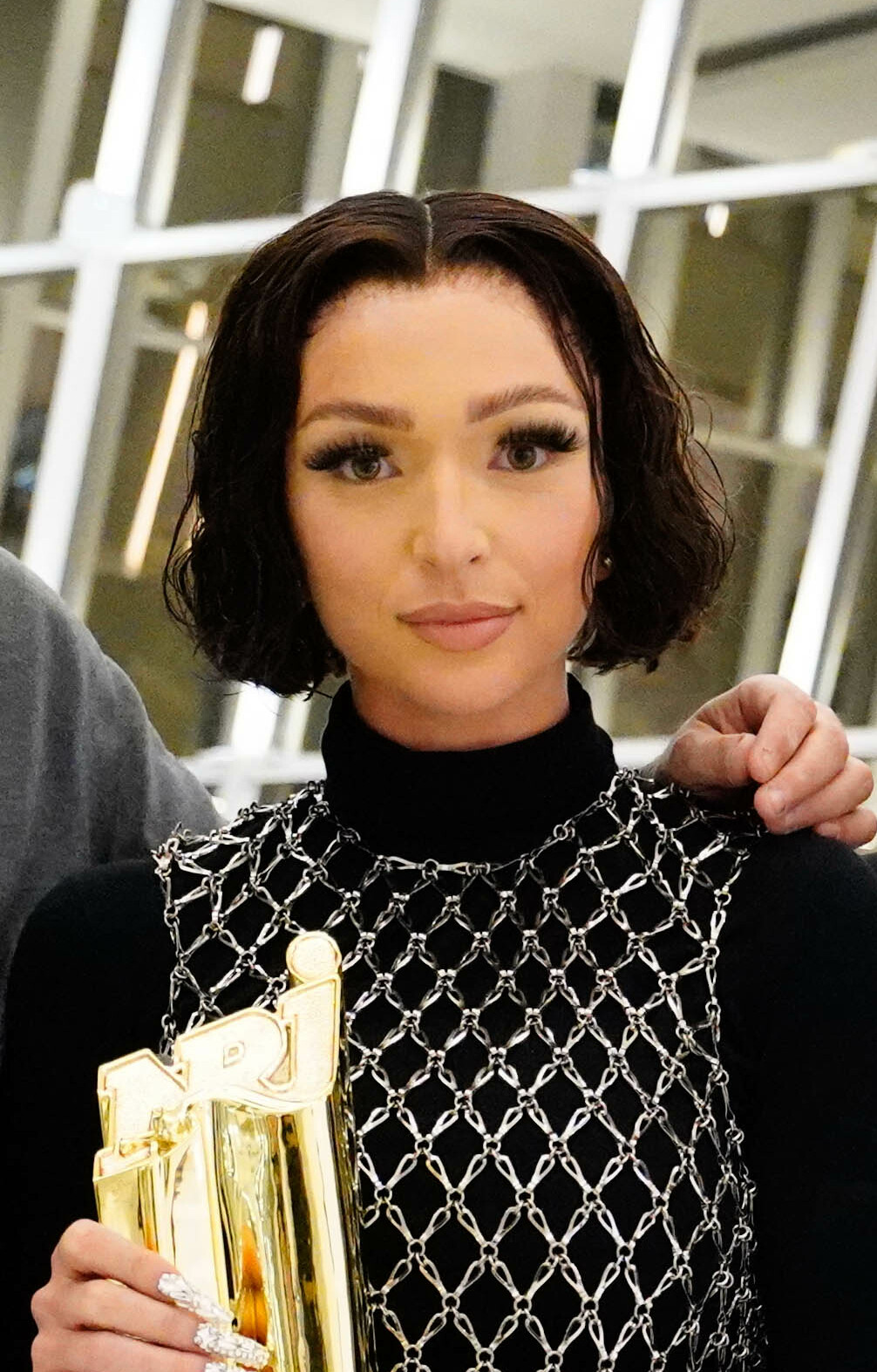
Eva Queen

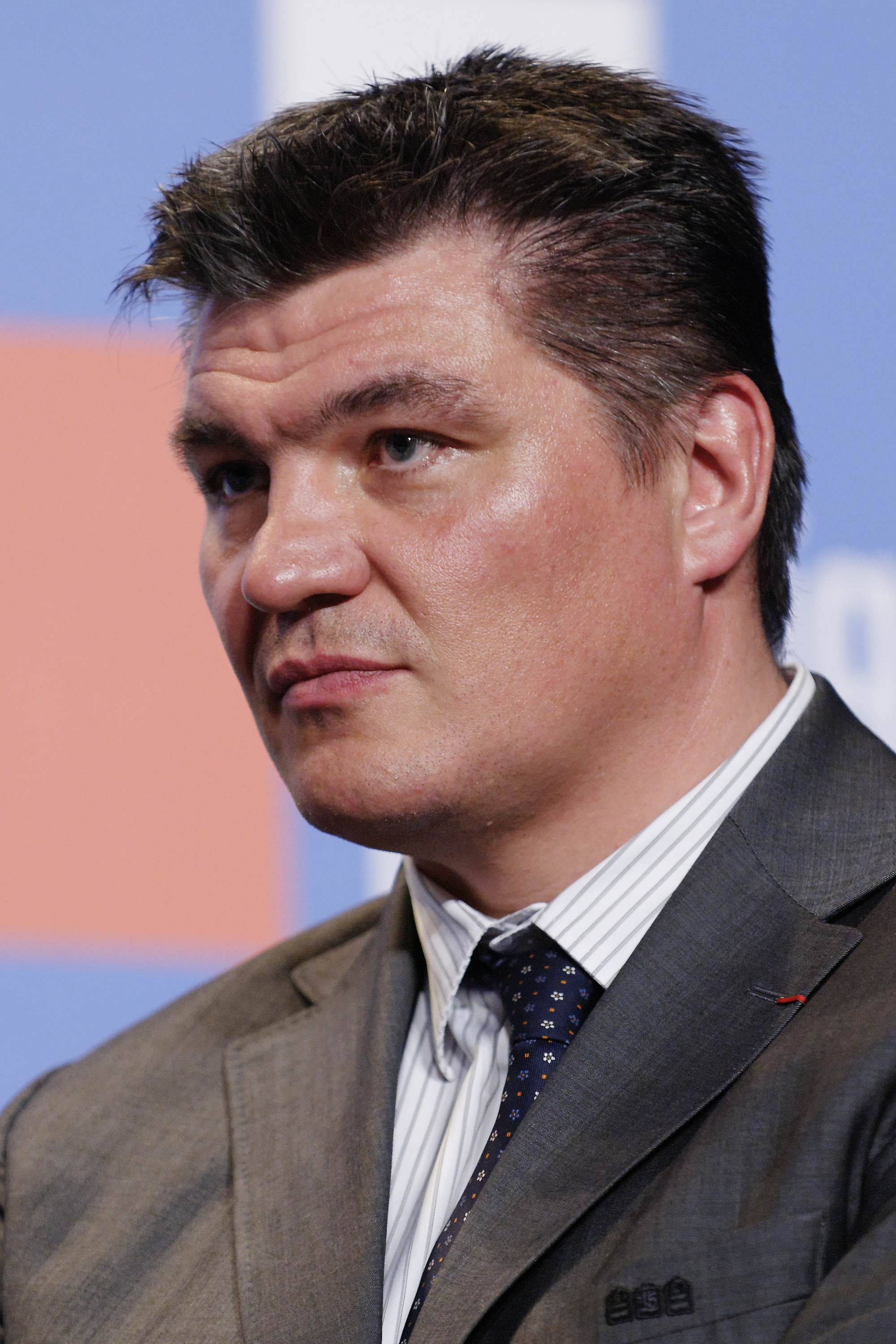
David Douillet

== Scoring ==
Team	Place	1	2	3	4	5	6	7	8	9	10
Billy & Fauve	1	4 Buzz		36	35	26	38	47 + 20 = 67	32 + 20 = 52	39 + 35 = 74	39
Carla & Pierre	2		4 Buzz	31	31	20	35	41 + 10 = 51	34 + 25 = 59	35 + 32 = 67	39
Stéphane & Calisson	3		4 Buzz	33	25	20	36	36 + 5 = 41	37 + 15 = 52	33 + 33 = 66	38
Thomas & Elsa	4	24 + 8 = 32		27	23	20	20	30	24 + 5 = 29	31 + 0 = 31	
Léa & Christophe	5		26 + 10 = 36	26	24	23	31	34 + 15 = 49	27 + 10 = 37		
Florent & Inès	6		27 + 8 = 35	28	26	20	22	33			
Anggun & Adrien	7	23 + 6 = 29		24	27	19	25				
Amandine & Anthony	8	27 + 10 = 37		23	30	16					
Eva & Jordan	9	21		28	24						
Clémence & Candice	10		21 + 6 = 27	19							
Théo & Alizée	11		19								
David & Katrina	12	Red buzz									

Red numbers indicate couples with the lowest score for each week.
Blue numbers indicate couples with the highest score for each week.
Green numbers indicate couples who did not dance their second dance for each week.
the couple earned immunity, and could not be eliminated
indicates couples eliminated that week.
indicates the returning couple who finished in the bottom two.
indicates the winning couple.
indicates the runner-up couple.
indicates the third place couple.

=== Notes of each couples ===
Couple	Total	10	9	8	7	6	5	4	3	2	1	Average
Billy & Fauve	36	10	20	5	1	—N/a						9.1
Carla & Pierre	36	4	9	17	5	1	—N/a					8.3
Stéphane & Calisson	36	4	13	7	8	3	—N/a	1	—N/a			8.1
Thomas & Elsa	32	—N/a		4	10	9	7	2	—N/a			6.2
Léa & Christophe	28	—N/a		7	10	10	1	—N/a				6.8
Florent & Inès	24	—N/a		2	11	8	3	—N/a				6.5
Anggun & Adrien	19	—N/a			6	11	2	—N/a				6.2
Amandine & Anthony	15	—N/a		2	5	5	3	—N/a				6.4
Eva & Jordan	12	—N/a			6	3	1	2	—N/a			6.1
Clémence & Candice	8	—N/a				1	6	1	—N/a			5.0
Théo & Alizée	4	—N/a					3	1	—N/a			4.8
David & Katrina	0	—N/a										N/A
Total	250	18	42	44	62	51	26	7	0	0	0	7.2

== Averages ==
This table only counts dances scored on the traditional 40-point scale.

Rank by average	Place	Couple	Total	Number of dances	Number of dances scored	Average
1	1	Billy & Fauve	327	13	9	36,33
2	2	Carla & Pierre	298	13	9	33,11
3	3	Stéphane & Calisson	291	11	9	32,33
4	5	Léa & Christophe	191	8	7	27,29
5	6	Florent & Inès	156	6	6	26,00
6	8	Amandine & Anthony	96	4	4	25,60
7	4	Thomas & Elsa	199	9	8	24,88
8	7	Anggun & Adrien	118	5	5	24,84
9	9	Eva & Jordan	73	3	3	24,33
10	10	Clémence & Candice	40	2	2	20,00
11	11	Théo & Alizée	19	1	1	19,00
12	12	David & Katrina	/	1	0	/

== Highest and lowest scoring performances ==
The best and worst dance performances according to the judges' marks were, out of 40 points:

Dance	Best dancer	Best score	Worst dancer	Worst score
Cha-Cha-Cha	Carla Lazzari	34	Anggun	23
Argentine Tango	Florent Peyre; Eva Queen	28	Clémence Castel	19
American Smooth	Amandine Petit	30	David Douillet	Red buzz
Waltz	Billy Crawford	34.7	Eva Queen; Clémence Castel	21
Contemporary Dance	Billy Crawford	36	Eva Queen; Clémence Castel	21
Modern Jazz	Florent Peyre	27	Florent Peyre	27
Samba	Billy Crawford	38	Thomas Da Costa	20
Quickstep	Billy Crawford; Carla Lazzari	32	Théo Fernandez	19
Jive	Carla Lazzari	31	Thomas Da Costa	26.7
Rumba	Billy Crawford	35	Florent Peyre	22
Salsa	Carla Lazzari	31	Carla Lazzari	31
Tango	Billy Crawford	37.6	Stéphane Legar	25
Charleston	Stéphane Legar	36	Billy Crawford	35
Paso Doble	Billy Crawford; Carla Lazzari	39	Thomas Da Costa	24
Foxtrot	Stéphane Legar	37	Stéphane Legar	37
Freestyle	Billy Crawford	39	Stéphane Legar	38

== Couples' Highest and lowest scoring performances ==
According to the traditional 40-point scale:

Couples	Highest Scoring Dances	Lowest Scoring Dances
Billy and Fauve	Paso Doble; Freestyle (39)	Quickstep (32)
Carla and Pierre	Paso Doble (39)	Waltz / Contemporary (26.7)
Stéphane and Calisson	Freestyle (38)	Tango (25)
Thomas and Elsa	Contemporary (31)	Samba (20)
Léa and Christophe	Contemporary (31)	American Smooth (24)
Florent and Inès	Argentine Tango (28)	Rumba (22)
Anggun and Adrien	Tango (27)	Cha-Cha-Cha (23)
Amandine and Anthony	American Smooth (30)	Contemporary (21.3)
Eva and Jordan	Argentine Tango (28)	Waltz / Contemporary (21)
Clémence and Candice	Waltz / Contemporary (21)	Argentine Tango (19)
Théo and Alizée	Quickstep (19)	Quickstep (19)
David and Katrina	American Smooth (Red Buzz)	American Smooth (Red Buzz)

== Weekly Scores ==
=== Week 1 ===
Individual judges scores in the chart below (given in parentheses) appeared in this order from left to right: François Alu, Bilal Hassani, Marie-Agnès Gillot, Chris Marques.

Each juste have a golden buzzer, If each judge buzz for a couple, the couple is immediately qualified for prime 3.

Chris Marques have, in addition of the golden buzzer, a red buzz, if he activates the red buzzer, the couple is immediately in bottom 3.

Running order

Couple	Score	Style	Music	Total
Anggun & Adrien	23 (6,6,6,5)	Cha-cha-cha	Break My Soul - Beyoncé	
Amandine & Anthony	27 (7,7,7,6)	Argentine Tango	Bruler le Feu - Juliette Armanet	
David & Katrina	Red buzzer	American smooth	Mesdames - Grand Corps Malade	
Thomas & Elsa	24 (5,8,7,4)	Argentine Tango	Tôt Le Matin - Gaël Faye	
Billy & Fauve	4 Buzz	Cha-cha-cha	Watermelon Sugar - Harry Styles	
Eva & Jordan	21 (4,6,6,5)	Waltz/Contemporary	Dangerous Woman - Ariana Grande	
Choreography challenge
Amandine & Anthony	+10	Clap Your Hands - Kungs		37
Thomas & Elsa	+8	Clap Your Hands - Kungs		32
Anggun & Adrien	+6	Clap Your Hands - Kungs		29
Face To Face
Eva & Jordan	Safe (58%)	Paso Doble	You Really Got Me - 2WEI	
Anggun & Adrien	Safe (18%)	Paso Doble	You Really Got Me - 2WEI	
David & Katrina	Eliminated (24%)	Paso Doble	You Really Got Me - 2WEI	

Judges' votes to save

- Alu: Anggun & Adrien
- Hassani: Anggun & Adrien
- Gillot: Anggun & Adrien
- Marques: Anggun & Adrien

=== Week 2 ===
Individual judges scores in the chart below (given in parentheses) appeared in this order from left to right: Bilal Hassani, Marie-Agnès Gillot, Jean-Marc Généreux, François Alu.

Chris Marques tested positive for COVID-19 two days before the live show. As a result, Jean-Marc Généreux, judge until the Season 10 replace him.

Each juste have a golden buzzer, If each judge buzz for a couple, the couple is immediately qualified for prime 3.

Jean-Marc Généreux have, in addition of the golden buzzer, a red buzz, if he activates the red buzzer, the couple is immediately in bottom 3.

Running order

Couple	Score	Style	Music	Total
Florent & Inès	27 (7,7,6,7)	Modern Jazz	As It Was - Harry Styles	
Léa & Christophe	26 (7,7,6,6)	Samba	SloMo - Chanel	
Théo & Alizée	19 (5,5,4,5)	Quickstep	Blesse-moi - Therapie Taxi	
Carla & Pierre	4 Buzz	Contemporary	Running Up That Hill - Kate Bush	
Stéphane & Calisson	4 Buzz	Samba	Toko Toko - Dadju & Ronisia	
Clémence & Candice	21 (6,5,5,5)	Waltz / Contemporary	Ne me jugez pas - Camille Lellouche	
Choreography challenge
Léa & Christophe	+10	Swalla - Jason Derulo		36
Florent & Inès	+8	Swalla - Jason Derulo		35
Clémence & Candice	+6	Swalla - Jason Derulo		27
Face To Face
Florent & Inès	Save (64%)	Cha-Cha-Cha	Toop Toop - Cassius	
Clémence & Candice	Save (23%)	Cha-Cha-Cha	Toop Toop - Cassius	
Théo & Alizée	Eliminated (13%)	Cha-Cha-Cha	Toop Toop - Cassius	

Judges' votes to save

- Hassani: Clémence & Candice
- Gillot: Clémence & Candice
- Généreux: Clémence & Candice
- Alu: Théo & Alizée

=== Week 3 ===
Individual judges scores in the chart below (given in parentheses) appeared in this order from left to right: Bilal Hassani, Marie-Agnès Gillot, Chris Marques, François Alu.

The 10 remaining couples are put into 5 duels based on previous weeks, the 1st of prime 1 against the 1st of prime 2 and goes on.

The duels' winners are qualified for prime 4 while losers are in face to face.

Running order

Couple	Score	Style	Music	Result
Anggun & Adrien	24 (7,6,5,6)	American Smooth	Easy on Me - Adele	Bottom 5
Florent & Inès	28 (8,7,6,7)	Argentine Tango	Dexter's theme - Rolfe Kent	Safe
Carla & Pierre	31 (8,8,8,7)	Jive	Je t'aime Trop - Pas Sages	Safe
Amandine & Anthony	23 (6,6,5,6)	Samba	Liar - Camila Cabello	Bottom 5
Stéphane & Calisson	33 (8,9,8,8)	Contemporary	Respire - Gaël Faye	Bottom 5
Billy & Fauve	36 (9,9,9,9)	Contemporary	L'Enfer - Stromae	Safe
Thomas & Elsa	27 (7,7,6,7)	Waltz	Hold My Hand - Lady Gaga	Safe
Léa & Christophe	26 (7,6,6,7)	Rumba	Sublime & Silence - Julien Doré	Bottom 5
Clémence & Candice	19 (5,5,4,5)	Argentine Tango	Therefore I Am - Billie Eilish	Eliminated
Eva & Jordan	28 (7,7,7,7)	Argentine Tango	1, 2, 3 - Amel Bent & Hatik	Safe
Face To Face
Anggun & Adrien	Saved by the public	Quickstep	Walking On Sunshine - Katrina And The Waves	
Amandine & Anthony	Saved by the jury	Quickstep	Walking On Sunshine - Katrina And The Waves	
Stéphane & Calisson	Saved by the public	Quickstep	Walking On Sunshine - Katrina And The Waves	
Léa & Christophe	Saved by the jury	Quickstep	Walking On Sunshine - Katrina And The Waves	
Clémence & Candice	Eliminated	Quickstep	Walking On Sunshine - Katrina And The Waves	

=== Week 4 ===
Individual judges scores in the chart below (given in parentheses) appeared in this order from left to right: Bilal Hassani, Marie-Agnès Gillot, Chris Marques, François Alu.

Each couples dance a part of their routine with one or two guests

The 3 worst scoring couples goes to bottom 3

Running order

Couple	Guest(s)	Score	Style	Music	Result
Carla & Pierre	Alizée & Grégoire Lyonnet	31 (8,8,8,7)	Salsa	Despechá - Rosalía	Safe
Florent & Inès	Virginie (Wife of Florent)	26 (7,7,6,6)	Waltz / Contemporary	Avatar's Theme - James Horner	Safe
Anggun & Adrien	Jean-Marc Généreux	27 (7,7,7,6)	Tango	Coeur - Clara Luciani	Safe
Léa & Christophe	Danielle (grandmother of Léa)	24 (6,6,6,6)	American Smooth	Le Sens De La Famille - Grand Corps Malade & Leïla Bekhti	Bottom 3
Stéphane & Calisson	Keen'V	25 (7,7,4,7)	Tango	Moth to a Flame - Swedish House Mafia ft. The Weeknd	Safe
Thomas & Elsa	Pola Petrenko	23 (6,6,5,6)	Rumba	Un Jour Je Marierai Un Ange - Pierre de Maere	Bottom 3
Amandine & Anthony	Jean-Luc (Father of Amandine)	30 (8,7,7,8)	American Smooth	All By Myself - Céline Dion	Safe
Billy & Fauve	Coleen Garcia (Wife of Billy)	35 (9,9,9,8)	Charleston	Stay With Me - Calvin Harris	Safe
Eva & Jordan	Jazz Correia (sister of Eva)	24 (7,7,4,6)	Cha-cha-cha	Together Again - Janet Jackson	Eliminated
Face To Face
Léa & Christophe	Saved by the jury		Samba	Don't Go Yet - Camila Cabello	
Thomas & Elsa	Saved by the public		Samba	Don't Go Yet - Camila Cabello	
Eva & Jordan	Eliminated		Samba	Don't Go Yet - Camila Cabello	

Judges' votes to save

- Hassani: Eva & Jordan
- Gillot: Eva & Jordan
- Marques: Léa & Christophe
- Alu: Léa & Christophe

=== Week 5 ===
Individual judges scores in the chart below (given in parentheses) appeared in this order from left to right: Bilal Hassani, Marie-Agnès Gillot, Chris Marques, François Alu.

Each couples dance in trio with one of the judge.

The 2 couples of the best scoring team are qualified for prime 6 while all the others are sent in bottom 6.

Christophe Licata being sick & Calisson Goasdoué being injured, are replaced by Jordan Mouillerac & Candice Pascal for This week to dance with Léa Elui & Stéphane Legar.

Barbara Pravi had a special appearance in Carla Lazzari's CV.

Running order

Couple	Guest	Score	Style	Music	Result
Anggun & Adrien	François Alu	19 (7,6,6,X)	Paso Doble	Insomnia - 2WEI	Bottom 6
Florent & Inès	Chris Marques	20 (7,7,X,6)	Samba	Le Casse de Brice - Jean Dujardin	Bottom 6
Carla & Pierre	Bilal Hassani	20 (X,7,7,6)	Waltz / Contemporary	Voilà - Barbara Pravi	Safe
Amandine & Anthony	Marie-Agnès Gillot	16 (6,X,5,5)	Contemporary	La Superbe - Benjamin Biolay	Eliminated
Stéphane & Candice	François Alu	20 (7,7,6,X)	American Smooth / Contemporary	Arcade - Duncan Laurence	Bottom 6
Thomas & Elsa	Chris Marques	20 (7,7,X,6)	Jive	Alright - Supergrass	Bottom 6
Billy & Fauve	Marie-Agnès Gillot	26 (9,X,9,8)	Waltz / Contemporary	"Ave Maria" 2WEI	Bottom 6
Léa & Jordan	Bilal Hassani	23 (X,7,8,8)	Tango	Tu Me Play - Juliette Armanet	Safe
Face To Face
Anggun & Adrien	Saved by the jury		Cha-cha-cha	About Damn Time - Lizzo	
Florent & Inès	Saved by the jury		Cha-cha-cha	About Damn Time - Lizzo	
Amandine & Anthony	Eliminated		Cha-cha-cha	About Damn Time - Lizzo	
Stéphane & Candice	Saved by the jury		Cha-cha-cha	About Damn Time - Lizzo	
Thomas & Elsa	Saved by the public		Cha-cha-cha	About Damn Time - Lizzo	
Billy & Fauve	Saved by the public		Cha-cha-cha	About Damn Time - Lizzo	

=== Week 6 ===
Individual judges scores in the chart below (given in parentheses) appeared in this order from left to right: Bilal Hassani, Marie-Agnès Gillot, Chris Marques, François Alu.

Each couples discover their music only 15 minutes before performing live, so, they only rehearsed on a metronome.

The 3 worst scoring couples will be in bottom 3.

Calisson Goasdoué being still being injured, is still replaced by Candice Pascal to dance with Stéphane Legar.

Running order

Couple	Score	Style	Music	Result
Carla & Pierre	35 (9,9,8,9)	Tango	"Libre" - Angèle	Safe
Anggun & Adrien	25 (7,6,6,6)	Quickstep	"I'll Be There for You" - The Rembrandts	Eliminated
Florent & Inès	22 (6,6,5,5)	Rumba	"Et Un Jour, Une Femme" - Florent Pagny	Bottom 3
Stéphane & Candice	36 (9,9,9,9)	Charleston	"Perm" - Bruno Mars	Safe
Thomas & Elsa	20 (6,5,4,5)	Samba	"Candy Shop" - CryJaxx feat Junior Charles	Bottom 3
Billy & Fauve	38 (10,10,9,9)	Samba	"Everybody (Backstreet's Back)" - Backstreet Boys	Safe
Léa & Christophe	31 (8,8,7,8)	Contemporary	"À Fleur De Toi" - Vitaa	Safe
Face To Face
Thomas & Elsa	Saved by the public	Jive	"I'm Still Standing" - Elton John	
Florent & Inès	Saved by the jury	Jive	"I'm Still Standing" - Elton John	
Anggun & Adrien	Eliminated	Jive	"I'm Still Standing" - Elton John	

Judges' votes to save

- Hassani: Florent & Inès
- Gillot: Florent & Inès
- Marques: Anggun & Adrien
- Alu: Florent & Inès

=== Week 7 ===
Individual judges scores in the chart below (given in parentheses) appeared in this order from left to right: Bilal Hassani, Marie-Agnès Gillot, Chris Marques, François Alu, Denitsa Ikonomova.

This week, a 5th judge give is added to the 4 usual jury-members.

The 2 worst scoring couples will be in bottom 4 directly.

The 4 others got bonus points with choreography challenge and the 2 worst scoring couples in total were sent in bottom 4 too.

Calisson Goasdoué being still being injured, is still replaced by Candice Pascal to dance with Stéphane Legar.

Running order

Couple	Score	Style	Music	Result
Florent & Inès	33 (7,7,8,5,6)	Contemporary	Yalla - Calogero	Eliminated
Léa & Christophe	34 (8,7,5,7,7)	Cha-cha-cha	Summer Renaissance - Beyoncé	Bottom 4
Carla & Pierre	41 (9,8,8,8,8)	Rumba	Bad Boy - Yseult	Safe
Stéphane & Candice	36 (8,8,7,7,6)	Cha-cha-cha	Coup De Vieux - Bigflo & Oli & Julien Doré	Bottom 4
Billy & Fauve	47 (10,10,9,9,9)	Tango	Tick Tick Boom - Sage The Gemini	Safe
Thomas & Elsa	30 (7,7,6,5,5)	Paso Doble	Bad Habits - Ed Sheeran & Bring Me the Horizon	Bottom 4
Choreography challenge
Billy & Fauve	+20	Quickstep	Show Me How You Burlesque - Christina Aguilera	67
Léa & Christophe	+15	Quickstep	Show Me How You Burlesque - Christina Aguilera	49
Carla & Pierre	+10	Quickstep	Show Me How You Burlesque - Christina Aguilera	51
Stéphane & Candice	+5	Quickstep	Show Me How You Burlesque - Christina Aguilera	41
Face To Face
Florent & Inès	Eliminated	Samba	Simple & Funky - Alliance Ethnik	
Léa & Christophe	Saved by the jury	Samba	Simple & Funky - Alliance Ethnik	
Stéphane & Candice	Saved by the jury	Samba	Simple & Funky - Alliance Ethnik	
Thomas & Elsa	Saved by the public	Samba	Simple & Funky - Alliance Ethnik	

=== Week 8 ===
Individual judges scores in the chart below (given in parentheses) appeared in this order from left to right: Bilal Hassani, Marie-Agnès Gillot, Chris Marques, François Alu.

On the first dance, each couple must beat their highest score of the Season so, 38 for Billy & Fauve, 36 for Stéphane & Calisson, 35 for Carla & Pierre, 31 for Léa & Christophe & 27 for Thomas & Elsa.

On the second dance, each couple must will discover their routine, the music, the costumes, the scenography approximatively 1mn30 before the dance but, if they beat their highest score during the 1st dance, they'll have a 30 seconds bonus to prepare their second dance. At the end, the judge give bonus points to each couple, 5 points for the last, 10, 15, 20 & 25 points for the best.

Calisson Goasdoué come back After 3 weeks being injured. Christophe Licata being sick, is again replaced by Jordan Mouillerac to dance with Léa Elui.

The 1st by judge's score is qualified while all others are sent in bottom 4

Running order

Couple	Score	Style	Music	Result
Billy & Fauve	32 (9,8,8,7)	Quickstep	Lean On - Avera	Bottom 4
Thomas & Elsa	24 (7,6,5,6)	American Smooth	Everything I Do (I Do It For You) - Bryan Adams	Bottom 4
Carla & Pierre	34 (9,9,8,8)	Cha-cha-cha	Mon Coeur - Izïa	Safe
Léa & Jordan	27 (8,6,6,7)	Paso Doble	Smoke On The Water - 2WEI	Eliminated
Stéphane & Calisson	37 (10,9,9,9)	Foxtrot	Forrest - Soprano	Bottom 4
Improvised routine
Carla & Pierre	+25	Jive	Jailhouse Rock - Camila Mendes, Ashleigh Murray & Madelaine Petsch	59
Billy & Fauve	+20	Waltz	End Of The Road - Boyz II Men	52
Stéphane & Calisson	+15	Cha-cha-cha	Clic Clic Pan Pan - Yanns	52
Léa & Jordan	+10	Samba	Waka Waka (This Time For Africa) - Shakira	37
Thomas & Elsa	+5	Tango	Putain d'époque - Lujipeka	29
Face To Face
Billy & Fauve	Saved by the jury	Salsa	Spice Up Your Life - Spice Girls	
Thomas & Elsa	Saved by the public	Salsa	Spice Up Your Life - Spice Girls	
Léa & Jordan	Eliminated	Salsa	Spice Up Your Life - Spice Girls	
Stéphane & Calisson	Saved by the jury	Salsa	Spice Up Your Life - Spice Girls	

=== Week 9 : Semi-final ===
Individual judges scores in the chart below (given in parentheses) appeared in this order from left to right: Bilal Hassani, Marie-Agnès Gillot, Chris Marques, François Alu.

Each couple will be coached all the week by M. Pokora & Katrina Patchett, winning couple of the Season 1 of Danse avec les stars and will impose to each couples one of the figures they did during their journey in season 1 for The first round.

The couple finishing last during the first round is directly sent in bottom 3 without doing the second round. The 2 worst scoring couple for The second round are sent in bottom 3.

Running order

Couple	Score	Total	Style	Music	Result
Carla & Pierre	35 (10,9,8,8)	67	Samba	Crazy In Love - Beyoncé & Jay-Z	Bottom 3
Carla & Pierre	32 (9,8,7,8)	67	Quickstep	Regarde-Moi - Céline Dion	Bottom 3
Thomas & Elsa	31 (8,8,8,7)	31	Contemporary	Dans le noir – Slimane	Eliminated
Thomas & Elsa	/	31	Cha-cha-cha	N/A	Eliminated
Billy & Fauve	39 (10,10,9,10)	74	Paso Doble	Let's Get It Started - Måneskin	Safe
Billy & Fauve	35 (9,9,8,9)	74	Rumba	Chasing Cars - Snow Patrol	Safe
Stéphane & Calisson	33 (9,8,7,9)	66	Rumba	Je te promets - Johnny Hallyday	Bottom 3
Stéphane & Calisson	33 (8,10,6,9)	66	Paso Doble	Bad - Michael Jackson	Bottom 3
Face To Face
Carla & Pierre	Saved by the public		Cha-cha-cha	My Head & My Heart - Ava Max	
Thomas & Elsa	Eliminated		Cha-cha-cha	My Head & My Heart - Ava Max	
Stéphane & Calisson	Saved by the jury		Cha-cha-cha	My Head & My Heart - Ava Max	

Judges' votes to save

- Hassani: Stéphane & Calisson
- Gillot: Stéphane & Calisson
- Marques: Stéphane & Calisson
- Alu: Thomas & Elsa

=== Week 10 : Final ===
Individual judges scores in the chart below (given in parentheses) appeared in this order from left to right: Bilal Hassani, Marie-Agnès Gillot, Chris Marques, François Alu.

David Douillet who was the first contestant eliminated this season will be dancing again in duet with Chris Marques

The last of the 1st dance is directly eliminated.

The 2 last dance weren't noted but the judges choose their favorite dance.

For the last dance, all judges (except Bilal Hassani) choose Billy & Fauve.

Running order

Couple	Score	Style	Music	Result
Billy & Fauve	39 (10,10,10,9)	Freestyle	Scream - Michael Jackson	Winner
Billy & Fauve	Bilal Hassani / Marie-Agnès Gillot	Jive	Footloose - Kenny Loggins	Winner
Stéphane & Calisson	38 (10,10,9,9)	Freestyle	Jerusalema - Master KG	3rd place
Stéphane & Calisson	N/A	Waltz	N/A	3rd place
Carla & Pierre	39 (10,10,9,10)	Paso Doble	Survivor - Destiny's Child	2nd Place
Carla & Pierre	Chris Marques / François Alu	Freestyle	Donne-moi le temps - Jenifer	2nd Place
The Last Dance
Billy & Fauve	53,5%	Contemporary	L'Enfer - Stromae	
Carla & Pierre	46,5%	Contemporary	Running Up That Hill - Kate Bush	

== Dance Chart ==
Couple	1	2	3	4	5	6	7		8		9		10		
Billy & Fauve	Cha-cha-cha	-	Contemporary	Charleston (with Coleen)	Waltz / Contemporary (with Marie-Agnès)	Samba	Tango	Quickstep	Quickstep	Waltz	Paso Doble	Rumba	Freestyle	Jive	Contemporary
Carla & Pierre	-	Contemporary	Jive	Salsa (with Alizée & Grégoire)	Waltz / Contemporary (with Bilal)	Tango	Rumba	Quickstep	Cha-Cha-Cha	Jive	Samba	Quickstep	Paso Doble	Freestyle	Contemporary
Stéphane & Calisson	-	Samba	Contemporary	Tango (with Keen'V)	American Smooth / Contemporary (with François)	Charleston	Cha-Cha-Cha	Quickstep	Foxtrot	Cha-Cha-Cha	Rumba	Paso Doble	Freestyle		
Thomas & Elsa	Argentine Tango	-	Waltz	Rumba (with Pola)	Jive (with Chris)	Samba	Paso Doble	-	American Smooth	Tango	Contemporary	-			
Léa & Christophe	-	Samba	Rumba	American Smooth (with Danielle)	Tango (with Bilal)	Contemporary	Cha-Cha-Cha	Quickstep	Paso Doble	Samba					
Florent & Inès	-	Modern Jazz	Argentine Tango	Waltz / Contemporary (with Virginie)	Samba (with Chris)	Rumba	Contemporary	-							
Anggun & Adrien	Cha-Cha-Cha	-	American Smooth	Tango (with Jean-Marc)	Paso Doble (with François)	Quickstep									
Amandine & Anthony	Argentine Tango	-	Samba	American Smooth (with Jean-Luc)	Contemporary (with Marie-Agnès)										
Eva & Jordan	Waltz / Contemporary	-	Argentine Tango	Cha-Cha-Cha (with Jazz)											
Clémence & Candice	-	Waltz / Contemporary	Argentine Tango												
Théo & Alizée	-	Quickstep													
David & Katrina	American Smooth														

Highest scoring dance
Lowest scoring dance
Danced, but not scored
