= Josua Hoffalt =

French ballet dancer (born 1984)

Josua Hoffalt (born May 19, 1984) is a French ballet dancer who was a Danseur Étoile (principal dancer) at the Paris Opera Ballet from 2012 to 2018.

He was promoted to Danseur Étoile on March 7, 2012, after dancing la Bayadère by Rudolf Nureyev with Aurélie Dupont at the Opéra Bastille in Paris, France. He retired from the stage in 2018.

He is a founding member of 3e étage, directed by Samuel Murez.
