= Ludmila Pagliero =

Argentinian ballet dancer

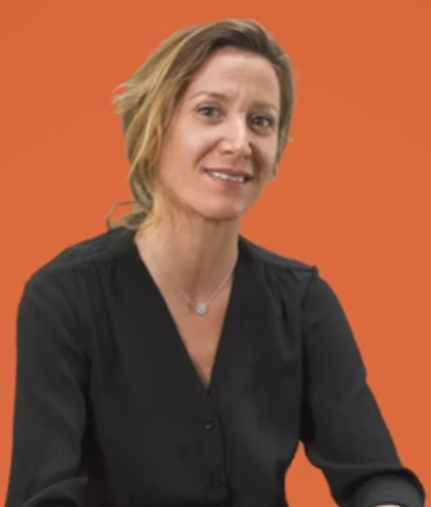
- In a 2020 interview
- Born: 15 October 1983 (age 43); Buenos Aires, Argentina
- Occupation: Ballet dancer
- Years active: 2000–2025
- Dancing career
- Current group: Paris Opera Ballet
- Former groups: American Ballet Theatre, Chilean National Ballet, Teatro Colón
- Dances: Classical ballet, contemporary dance, modern dance
- Website: Official website (archived)

Ludmila Pagliero (born 15 October 1983) is an Argentinian ballet dancer. From 2003 to her retirement in 2025, she danced with the Paris Opera Ballet, where she was a danseuse étoile (the highest rank of the Paris Opera Ballet) since 2012.

== Early life ==
Pagliero was born in Buenos Aires, in the Palermo district, to an electrician and a masseuse. At the age of 8, she started classical dance lessons, but it was a disappointment. She switched to jazz, but later went back to classical dance at the suggestion of her teacher.

Her new dance teacher suggested she should participate in the entrance competition for the Instituto Superior de Arte of the Teatro Colón. Though it was challenging, she was accepted, then 10 years old.

There, Ludmila received training from Olga Ferri, among others. She said in an interview that "all [her] dreams of being a dancer were born at the Teatro Colón".

== Career ==
=== Before the POB ===
She was offered a one-year contract at the Chilean National Ballet, also called Ballet of Santiago. This meant that she had to leave her family and move to another country at the age of 16. After some time at the Ballet of Santiago, she was promoted to soloist and danced more difficult roles, for example in The Sleeping Beauty and Theme and variations.

In 2003, she participated in the New York International Ballet Competition, where she was awarded the silver medal and the Igor Youskevitch Award, the latter of which secured her a one-year contract with the American Ballet Theatre.

Soon afterward, she made a trip to France to participate in an audition for the Paris Opera Ballet. There were 2 full-time contracts at stake, and she placed 5th. However, she later got a call for a temporary contract of three months, when she was already preparing to take the position at the ABT. She accepted the POB's offer.

=== Since joining the POB ===
When her initial contract, which was for Ivan The Terrible, ended, her contract was extended to the end of the season. In 2004, she participated in the international auditions a second time, again not winning a full-time position, but she was offered a contract as surnuméraire, which is a dancer who fills in when someone from the corps becomes unavailable. She had trouble feeling at home, as the vast majority of POB employees join through the Paris Opera Ballet School.

In 2005, she participated in the auditions again, this time earning a full-time contract. After that, with the help of Aurélie Dupont (training with dancers of higher ranks is a common practice at POB), she moved up the ranks through competing in the concours de promotion, eventually reaching the second-to highest rank, première danseuse, at the age of 26. Also in 2009, she received the Konex Award in the category "classical music".

In March 2012, there was a planned performance and cinema relay of Rudolf Nureyev's La Bayadère, but both Dorothée Gilbert, who had been cast for Gamzatti, and the understudy were injured. Pagliero, who had not performed the role in two years was asked to step in, and only had a quick rehearsal with Josua Hoffalt (Solor) and Dupont (Nikiya). At the end of the performance, the artistic director of the ballet announced Pagliero had been promoted to étoile, the highest rank of the company, for "the talent and artistic courage she had shown." This made her the first-ever South American étoile.

Pagliero retired from the Paris Opera Ballet following a performance of Mats Ek's Apartment on 17 April 2025.

She has been part of international cooperations, such as with the Bolshoi Theatre and the Mariinsky Theatre.
