= François Alu =

French ballet dancer

François Alu (born 3 December 1993 in Fussy) is a French ballet dancer. He danced with the Paris Opera Ballet as an étoile (star).

== Career ==
He entered the Paris Opera Ballet School in 2004, and the Paris Opera Ballet in 2010. At his first promotion competition in 2011, he was promoted to coryphée, then to sujet (semi-soloist) in 2013.

He has been a member of 3e étage, an independent dance group formed by dancers of the company’s corps de ballet and directed by Samuel Murez, since 2011.

In 2014, he was promoted to first dancer (full soloist). Notable roles include Basilio in Don Quixote, the Golden Idol in La Bayadère, Frollo in Roland Petit's Notre Dame de Paris, and Byraxis in Benjamin Millepied's Daphnis et Chloé.

On 23 April 2022, Alu was named étoile following a performance as Solor in La Bayadère. In November, Alu left the Paris Opera Ballet.
