= Pola Petrenko =

French actress (born 1997)

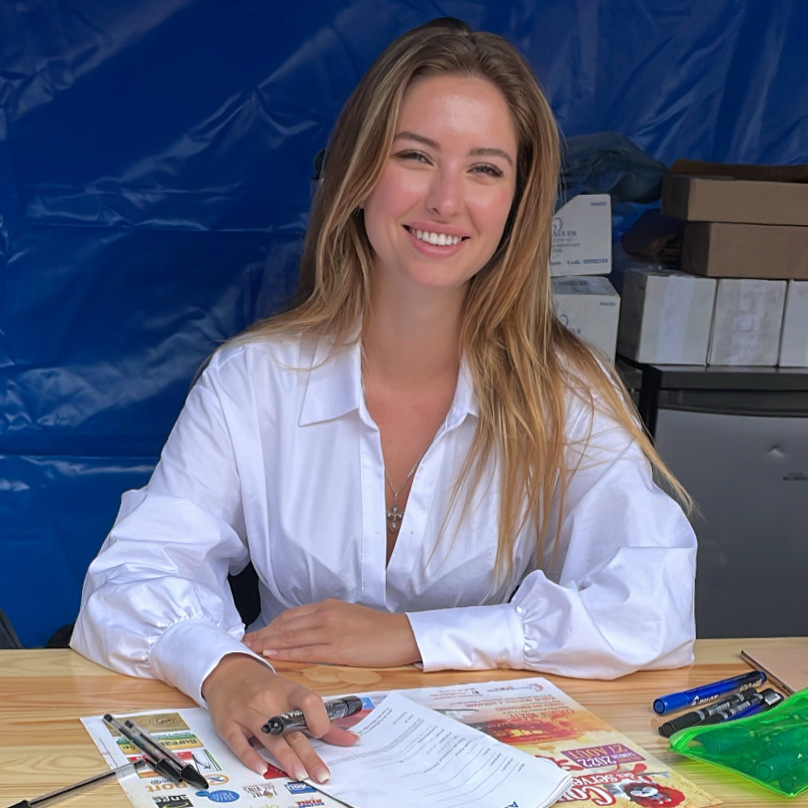
- Petrenko in 2022
- Born: 28 September 1997 (age 27); Paris, France
- Education: Cours Florent, Sorbonne Nouvelle University Paris 3
- Occupation(s): Actress, model
- Years active: 2015–present
- Spouse: Gabriel Rindone (married 2024–present)

Pola Petrenko (born 28 September 1997), is a French actress and model.

== Beginnings and education ==
Pola Petrenko was born in Paris, to a French businessman father and a Russian mother, a journalist and director. From the age of four, Pola became a model for artistic photos. At the age of five, she entered the Stanlowa Ballet School in Paris, took acting classes from the age of eight at Studio Maria, then at the Cours Florent in Paris until 2014. She obtained a degree in cinema at Sorbonne Nouvelle University Paris 3.

== Career ==
In 2020, she joined the cast of the daily series Ici tout commence, broadcast on TF1 playing the role of Charlene Teyssier.

== Filmography ==
=== Advertising ===
- 2016 : Monaco Yacht Show
- 2017 : Asus
- 2017 : 20 years of IXINA, TF1
- 2017 : La Modeuse, TV spot M6
- 2018 : La Modeuse, TV spot
- 2018: Dragon Quest

=== Dubbing ===
- 2009: The Imaginarium of Doctor Parnassus (film): Olga

=== Film and television ===
- 2015: Testament (short film): Josephine
- 2017: The Creature (short film) : the creature
- 2018: The Elixir Pact (short film): Sophie
- 2018: Missing Misses on Canal+
- 2019: Good luck Mr Gorsky : Natalia
- Since 2020: Ici tout commence on TF1: Charlène Teyssier
- 2021: Serial Écolo (short film): country guard
- 2024: Camping Paradis S18E07 et S18E08 Une Régate au paradis : Zoé
