= Samuel Murez =

- Born: 1982 (age 43–44)
- Occupations: Director, choreographer, filmmaker, composer, producer, dancer
- Dancing career
- Current group: Paris Opera Ballet
- Dances: Ballet

Samuel Murez, born October 22, 1982, is a Franco-American director, choreographer, film-maker, editor, composer, producer, and dancer. He has been a member of the Paris Opera Ballet since 2001. He has been the artistic director of 3e étage, an independent group of soloists and dancers of the Paris Opera Ballet, since its founding in 2004.

== Artistic direction ==
Samuel Murez has been artistic director of 3e étage since its founding in 2004.

He has stated that he feels his essential role is to foster the very specific 3e étage culture and approach.
He has overseen the group's development from a "pick-up" style group that performed once in a year into an established company that performs programs by multiple artistic directors year-round in major national and international venues, to audience and critical acclaim.

== Choreography ==
Murez has stated in interviews that though what he most loved at Paris Opera Ballet School were the rare opportunities to create and improvise, he only realized much later, once he was a member of the Paris Opera Ballet, that his calling might be to create rather than interpret, and that was something one could make a career of.

Critical writing about his work has tended to mention ingenuity and theatricality in narrative, construction, and staging, the use of a very wide range of styles and techniques, original and very physical choreographic composition, and an irreverent sense of humor.

Notable works include :

- "Numbered Minutes"

a short film, shot at the Palais Garnier, that he choreographed, danced, directed, and edited

- "me2" (2006)

text by raymond federman, music by the Misters, premiered 3e étage's founding performance in Vieux-Boucau in 2006

- "Éphiphénomènes" (2006)

music by the Misters, premiered at 3e étage's founding performance in Vieux-Boucau in 2006

- "Quatre" (2006)

music by Johannes Brahms after Niccolo Paganini, commissioned by Emmanuel Thibault, premiered in Bogotá, Colombia, August 2006

- "Processes of Intricacy" (2011)

No music, premiered in St Malo, France

- "Désordres" ("Disorders") (2011)

a full-length evening conceived by Murez as a series of interwoven scenes tied together by recurring themes, motifs, and characters, exploring the tension between formal order and the creative chaos. Scenes include "La Valse Infernale", "Chaconne", "Epiphénomènes", "me2", "Processes of intricacy", "Quatre", "me9", as well as a two scenes by other choreographers

- "Premier Cauchemar" ("First nightmare")

Prologue of the full-length narrative work "Le Rêveur" (The Dreamer), to an original score by Siegfried de Turckheim.

- "Dérèglements" ("le Pillow Thirteen") (2013)

Murez' first full-length program of his own work, a followup to "Désordres", it reprised some of the scenes and characters from Désordres, as well as new material, including "La Danse des Livres", "Méphisto", "Thirst", and "Désordres (final)"

His work as a choreographer has been performed at the Opera Bastille amphitheater in 2006, 2011, and 2013, at the Festival des Arts de St Sauveur, Canada, in 2011, at international festival Jardins del Cap Roig in 2009, Sagunto en Escena in 2008, and at the Teatro Coliseo in Buenos Aires in 2012.

== Film-making ==
Murez directed and edited the short film of his choreography Numbered Minutes (2005).

He wrote, shot, directed, and edited a 52-minute documentary about Korean Principal dancer Yong-Geol Kim, entitled Step by Step. This film was shown as part of a series of performances called which were nominated by the Korean press for best dance show of the year.
He choreographed and danced in the film Contresens, directed by Pierre-Alfred Richard, and produced by France 3 and Onyx films.

He choreographed the video for Interlude, a perfume by Amouage.

== Music ==
Murez studied piano and solfège for 10 years.

He composed the scores to some of the scenes in "Dérèglements" (2013). These include the "Prelude" that plays during the "smoke-smoke" scene, and the humorous "Ray-Ban" march from "Désordres (final)".

He also created and mixed the mashups used for the other scenes in "Désordres (final)".

He has stated that collaborating with other composers on their scores to his work is one of his favorite creative activities.

== Production ==
As artistic director of 3e étage, Murez also produces shows that are artistically directed by other artists, using the resources and producing experience of the company to help other choreographers and directors realize their vision.

Under the 3e étage banner, he has produced:

- Carte Blanche à Agnès Letestu (2009) directed by Agnès Letestu

== Dance ==
Murez studied at the Paris Opera Ballet School from 1996 to 2001. He entered the Paris Opera Ballet in 2001.

Featured / soloist roles at the Paris Opera Ballet include:

- the Rock-star in the Seven deadly sins, choreography by Laura Scozzi
- Hilarion in Giselle, choreography by Patrice Bart after Jean Coralli and Jules Perrot
- the Fakir in La Bayadère, choreography by Rudolf Nureyev after Marius Petipa
- the Director in Cinderella, choreography by Rudolf Nureyev
- the Duke in Lady of the Camelias, choreography by John Neumeier
- Chinese dance in The Nutcracker, choreography by Rudolf Nureyev after Marius Petipa
- Coppelius in Coppélia pas de trois, choreography by Patrice Bart

He also performed roles in the following works :

- Artifact Suite, choreography by William Forsythe
- A sort of... choreography by Mats Ek
- The Rite of Spring and Orpheus und Eurydike, choreography by Pina Bausch
- Petrushka, choreography by Michel Fokine
- The Rite of Spring, choreography by Paul Taylor
- Les Noces, choreography by Bronislava Nijinska.

As part of 3e étage, he originated roles in his own work, which were later passed on to various dancers in the group:

- the Trickster in Éphiphénomènes
- me2 in "me2"
- Quatre in Quatre
- the male role in "Chaconne"
- Pierre-Louis in "Thirst"

Critical reception of his work as a dancer has tended to praise his technical and dramatic qualities, but noted that his "demi-caractère" physique, style, and placement do not fit into Paris Opera Ballet norms.
