= Teddy Sinclair discography =

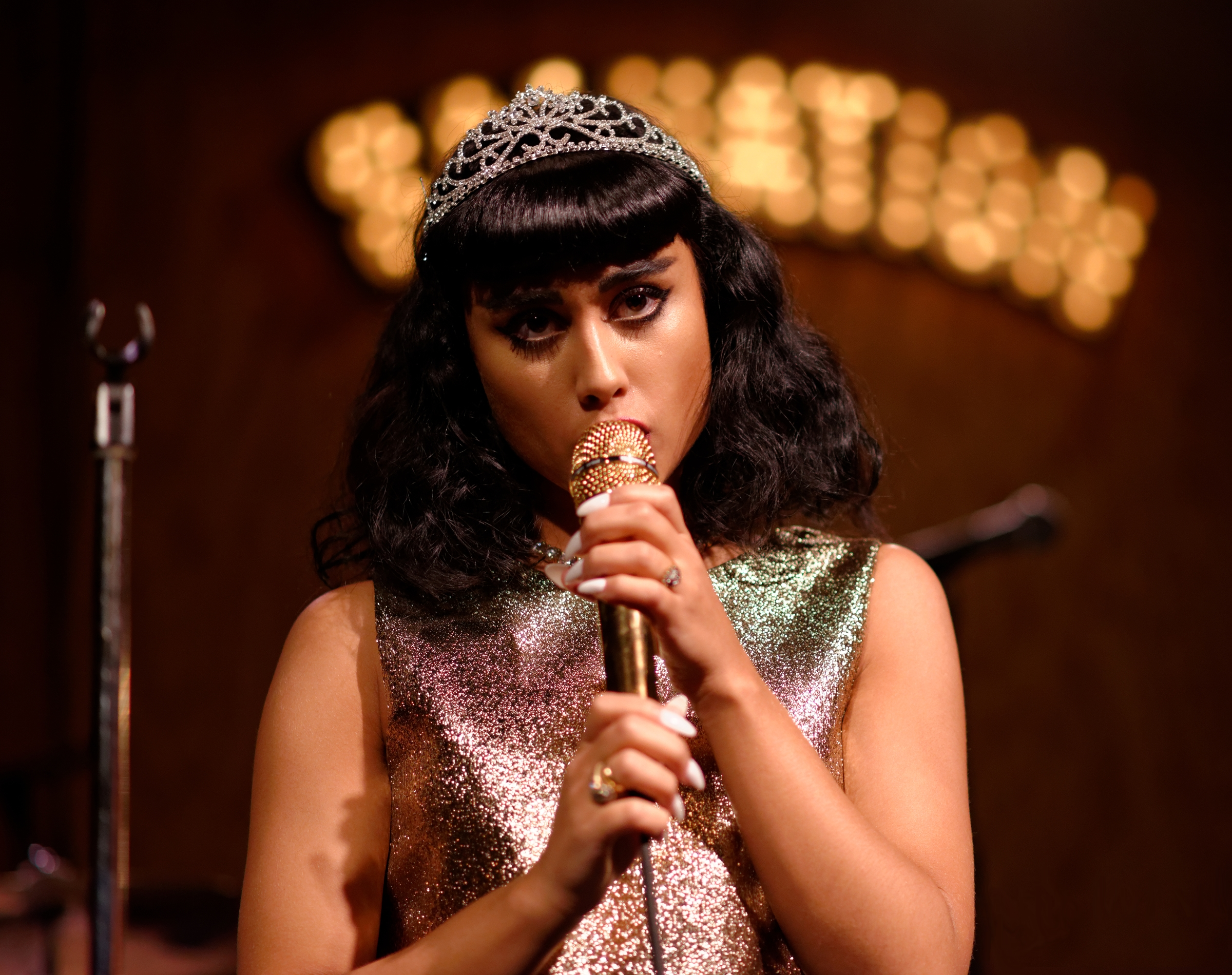
- Sinclair performing in 2014
- Studio albums: 2
- Extended plays: 1
- Singles: 10
- Promotional singles: 4

English singer Teddy Sinclair has released two studio albums, one extended play (EP), 18 singles (including eight as a featured artist) and four promotional singles. She began her musical career by releasing a standalone single, entitled "Don't Play Nice", under the alias of Verbalicious, with label All Around the World. Although the song reached number eleven in the United Kingdom, the label went bankrupt shortly after the song's release. In 2008, Sinclair collaborated with French recording artist M. Pokora in the song "They Talk Shit About Me", as Verse. Sinclair later changed her stage name to Natalia Cappuccini and released the extended play Wommanequin independently.

After signing a record deal with Cherrytree, an imprint of Interscope, Sinclair released her debut album Perfectionist in April 2011 using the name Natalia Kills. The album peaked at number 129 on the UK Albums Chart. It also debuted at number 134 on the US Billboard 200. To promote it, four singles were released, including "Mirrors", which was able to reach the top 10 in Austria and Germany. Her second record, Trouble, was released in September 2013. It debuted on the US Billboard 200 at number 70. Its release was preceded by the singles "Problem" and "Saturday Night"; the latter became a moderate hit in New Zealand, reaching the top 30 there.

== Studio albums ==
List of albums, with selected chart positions
| Title | Details | Peak chart positions | | | | | | |
| Title | Details | UK | AUT | CAN | GER | SWI | US | US Dance |
|---|---|---|---|---|---|---|---|---|
| Perfectionist (as Natalia Kills) | Released: 1 April 2011; Label: Universal, will.i.am, Cherrytree, KonLive, Interscope; Formats: CD, digital download | 129 | 35 | 36 | 50 | 94 | 134 | 6 |
| Trouble (as Natalia Kills) | Released: 3 September 2013; Label: Universal, Interscope; Formats: CD, digital download | — | — | — | — | — | 70 | — |
"—" denotes releases that did not chart or were not released in that territory.

== Extended plays ==
List of extended plays
| Title | Details |
|---|---|
| Womannequin (as Natalia Cappuccini) | Released: 9 October 2008; Label: Independent; Formats: Digital download |
| +30mg (as Cruel Youth) | Released: 16 September 2016; Label: Disgrace; Formats: Digital download |

== Singles ==
=== As lead artist ===
List of singles as lead artist, showing year released, selected chart positions, certifications, and originating album
| Single | Year | Peak chart positions | | | | | | | | | | | Certifications | Album |
| Single | Year | UK | AUT | BEL (FL) Tip | BEL (WA) Tip | CAN | GER | NLD | NZ | POL | SWI | US Dance | Certifications | Album |
as Verbalicious
| "Don't Play Nice" | 2005 | 11 | — | — | — | — | — | — | — | — | — | — | | Non-album single |
as Natalia Kills
| "Mirrors" | 2010 | 101 | 7 | 18 | — | 46 | 10 | — | — | 2 | 52 | 3 | BVMI: Gold | Perfectionist |
| "Wonderland" | 2011 | — | 55 | — | — | — | 45 | — | — | 5 | — | — | | Perfectionist |
| "Free" (featuring will.i.am) | 2011 | 118 | 4 | 20 | 13 | — | 15 | 96 | — | — | — | — | BVMI: Gold | Perfectionist |
| "Kill My Boyfriend" | 2012 | — | — | 20 | — | — | — | — | — | — | — | — | | Perfectionist |
| "Problem" | 2013 | — | — | — | — | — | — | — | — | — | — | — | | Trouble |
| "Saturday Night" | 2013 | — | — | — | — | — | — | — | 23 | — | — | 6 | | Trouble |
| "Trouble" (featuring Peaches) | 2014 | — | — | — | — | — | — | — | — | — | — | — | | Trouble |
as The Powder Room
| "My Way" | 2018 | — | — | — | — | — | — | — | — | — | — | — | | Non-album singles |
| "I Want It Now" | 2018 | — | — | — | — | — | — | — | — | — | — | — | | Non-album singles |
"—" denotes releases that did not chart or were not released in that territory.

=== As featured artist ===
List of singles as featured artist, showing year released, selected chart positions, certifications, and originating album
| Title | Year | Peak chart positions | | | | | | | | | | Certifications | Album |
| Title | Year | UK | AUS | AUT | BEL (FL) | BEL (WA) | CAN | GER | IRL | NLD | SWI | Certifications | Album |
|---|---|---|---|---|---|---|---|---|---|---|---|---|---|
| "They Talk Shit About Me" (M. Pokora featuring Verse) | 2008 | — | — | — | — | — | — | — | — | — | — | | MP3 |
| "Sliide" (Filly featuring Verse and Master Shortie) | 2008 | — | — | — | — | — | — | — | — | — | — | | Sliideshow |
| "2 Is Better" (Far East Movement & Ya Boy featuring Natalia Kills) | 2010 | — | — | — | — | — | — | — | — | — | — | | Free Wired |
| "Champagne Showers" (LMFAO featuring Natalia Kills) | 2011 | 32 | 9 | 18 | 23 | 32 | 53 | 41 | 15 | 81 | 56 | ARIA: 3× Platinum; MC: Gold; IFPI SWI: Gold | Sorry for Party Rocking |
| "You Can't Get in My Head (If You Don't Get in My Bed)" (DJ Tatana featuring Natalia Kills) | 2012 | — | — | — | — | — | — | — | — | — | — | | Heart |
| "Lights Out (Go Crazy)" (Junior Caldera featuring Natalia Kills and Far East Movement) | 2012 | — | — | — | — | — | 85 | — | — | — | — | | Dirty Bass |
| "Birds" (Izii featuring The Powder Room) | 2019 | — | — | — | — | — | — | — | — | — | — | | Non-album singles |
| "Till I See You Again" (Unsecret featuring The Powder Room) | 2019 | — | — | — | — | — | — | — | — | — | — | | Non-album singles |
"—" denotes releases that did not chart or were not released in that territory.

=== Promotional singles ===
List of promotional singles, showing year released and originating album
| Title | Year | Album |
|---|---|---|
| "Zombie" (as Natalia Kills) | 2009 | Perfectionist |
| "Activate My Heart" (as Natalia Kills) | 2010 | Non-album promotional single |
| "Controversy" (as Natalia Kills) | 2012 | Trouble |
| "Outta Time" (as Natalia Kills) | 2013 | Trouble |

== Guest appearances ==
List of non-single guest appearances, with other performing artists
| Title | Year | Other artist(s) | Album |
|---|---|---|---|
| "Next Big Me" (as Verbalicious) | 2004 | None | Sleepover |
| "No Champagne" (as Natalia Kills) | 2011 | Frankmusik | Do It in the AM |
| "1974" (as Natalia Kills) | 2011 | The Knux | Eraser |
| "Mirrors - Live At The Cherrytree House" (as Natalia Kills) | 2011 | None | The Cherrytree House Sessions, Volume 1 |
| "Isn't This A Lovely Day (To Be Caught In The Rain)?" (as The Powder Room) | 2020 | None | Irving Berlin Reimagined: Top Hat |

== Songwriting credits ==
| Song | Year | Artist | Album | Ref. |
|---|---|---|---|---|
| "Cry in Public" | 2010 | Peter Andre | Accelerate | |
| "Planes Fly" | 2013 | Angel Haze | Dirty Gold | |
| "Holy Water" | 2015 | Madonna | Rebel Heart | |
| "Kiss It Better" | 2016 | Rihanna | Anti | |
| "Gloe" | 2018 | Kiiara | Non-album singles | |
| "1%" | 2018 | Kiiara | Non-album singles | |
| "Supernova" | 2018 | Jonas Blue | Blue | |
| "Nonchalant" | 2018 | Alex The Flipper, Mavi Phoenix | Flippa Is For Flippa | |
| "Slow Down Turbo" | 2019 | Rich Brian | The Sailor | |
| "Swim Home" | 2019 | Cautious Clay | 13 Reasons Why | |
| "Business is Business" (featuring Dave East and A$AP Ferg) | 2019 | Godfather of Harlem | Godfather of Harlem | |
| "Jump" | 2020 | Melanie Faye | Melanie Faye | |
| "Lose" | 2020 | Niki | Moonchild | |
| "The Happiest Girl" | 2022 | Blackpink | Born Pink | |
