= List of songs recorded by Teddy Sinclair =

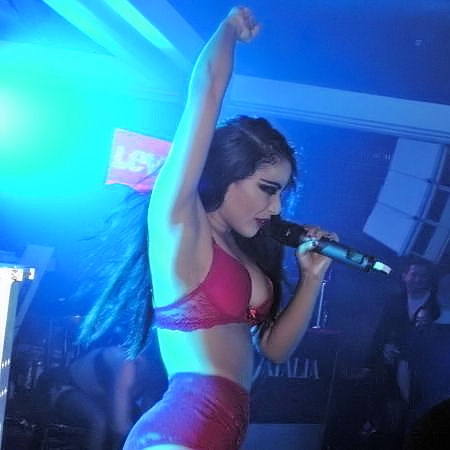
Sinclair (pictured) performing.

English singer Teddy Sinclair, previously known as Natalia Kills, has recorded songs for two studio albums and one extended play (EP), some of which were collaborations with other artists. She began her career as a recording artist by releasing the single "Don't Play Nice" on UK-based record label All Around the World Productions in 2005, under the name Verbalicious. Although the song peaked at number 11 on the UK Singles Chart, the label went bankrupt shortly after the track's release. Three years later, she co-wrote and provided vocals for "They Talk Shit About Me", a duet with French recording artist M. Pokora, as Verse. She also released an extended play entitled Womannequin to digital retailers, under Natalia Cappuccini.

In 2008, Sinclair started writing for other artists, under the alias Verbz. She also released a song named "Shopaholic", which was later remixed by Remix Artist Collective. American blogger Perez Hilton noticed that version and posted it online, which made her MySpace gain traction. Such attention prompted will.i.am Music Group to sign her in November, and Sinclair began recording material for a new album.

In March 2011, she released her debut studio album, Perfectionist, in which all tracks were co-composed by Sinclair. It peaked at number 129 on the UK Albums Chart, and entered the US Billboard 200 at number 134. During that year, she also collaborated with various recording artists, including The Knux, Far East Movement, and DJ Tatana. In the following year, she went to Los Angeles to work on her sophomore effort. Entitled Trouble, it was released in September 2013, and all its tracks had creative input from Sinclair and American record producer Jeff Bhasker. The album debuted at number 70 on the US Billboard 200, and spawned two singles, including "Problem" and "Saturday Night".

== Songs ==
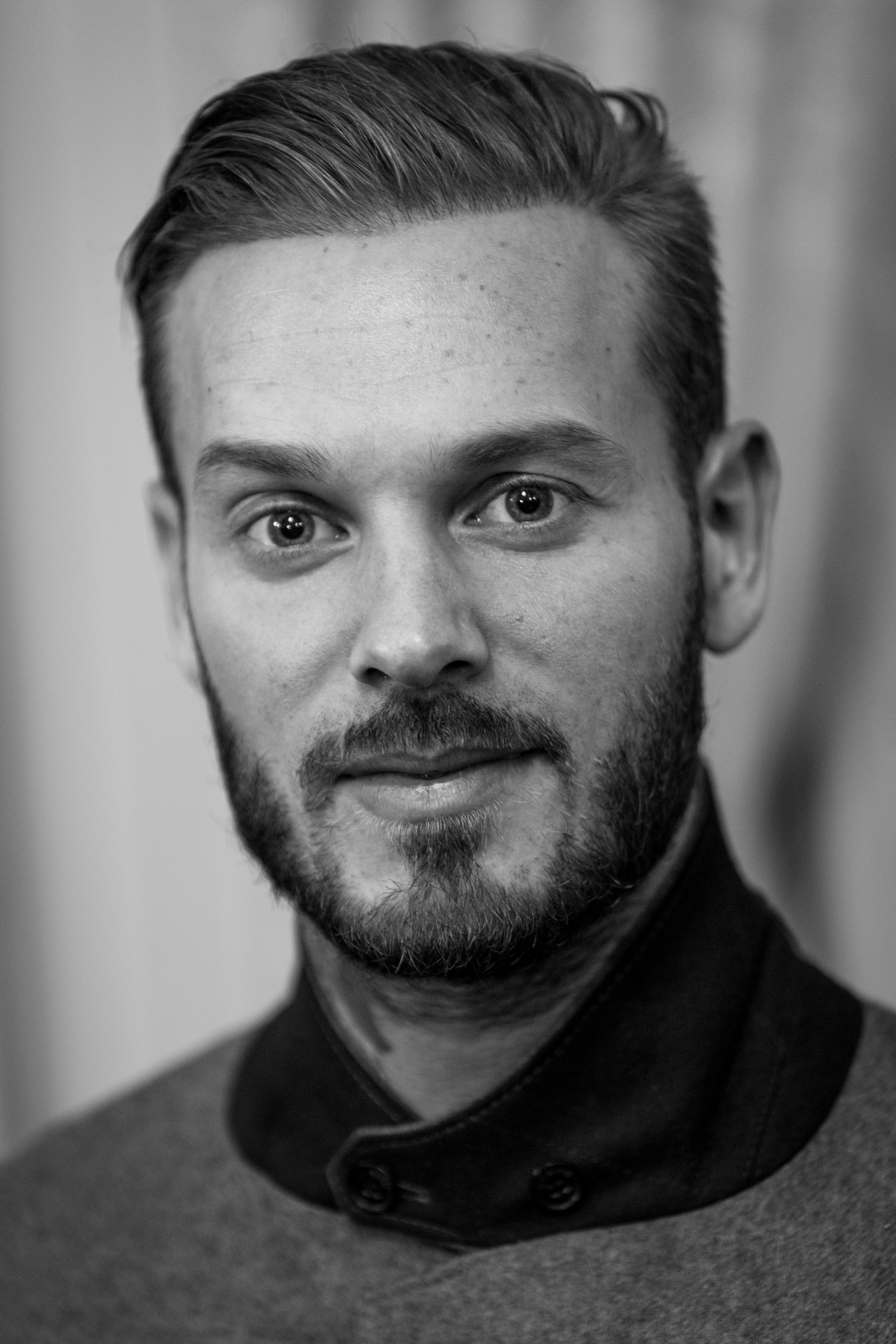
French recording artist M. Pokora (pictured) collaborated with Kills on "They Talk Shit About Me".

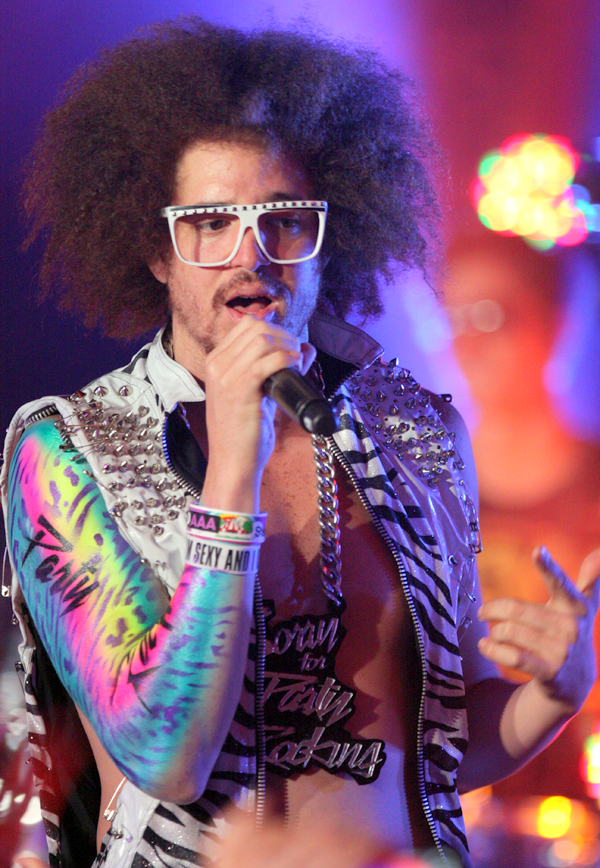
Kills was featured in "Champagne Showers", a song by LMFAO (duo member Redfoo pictured).

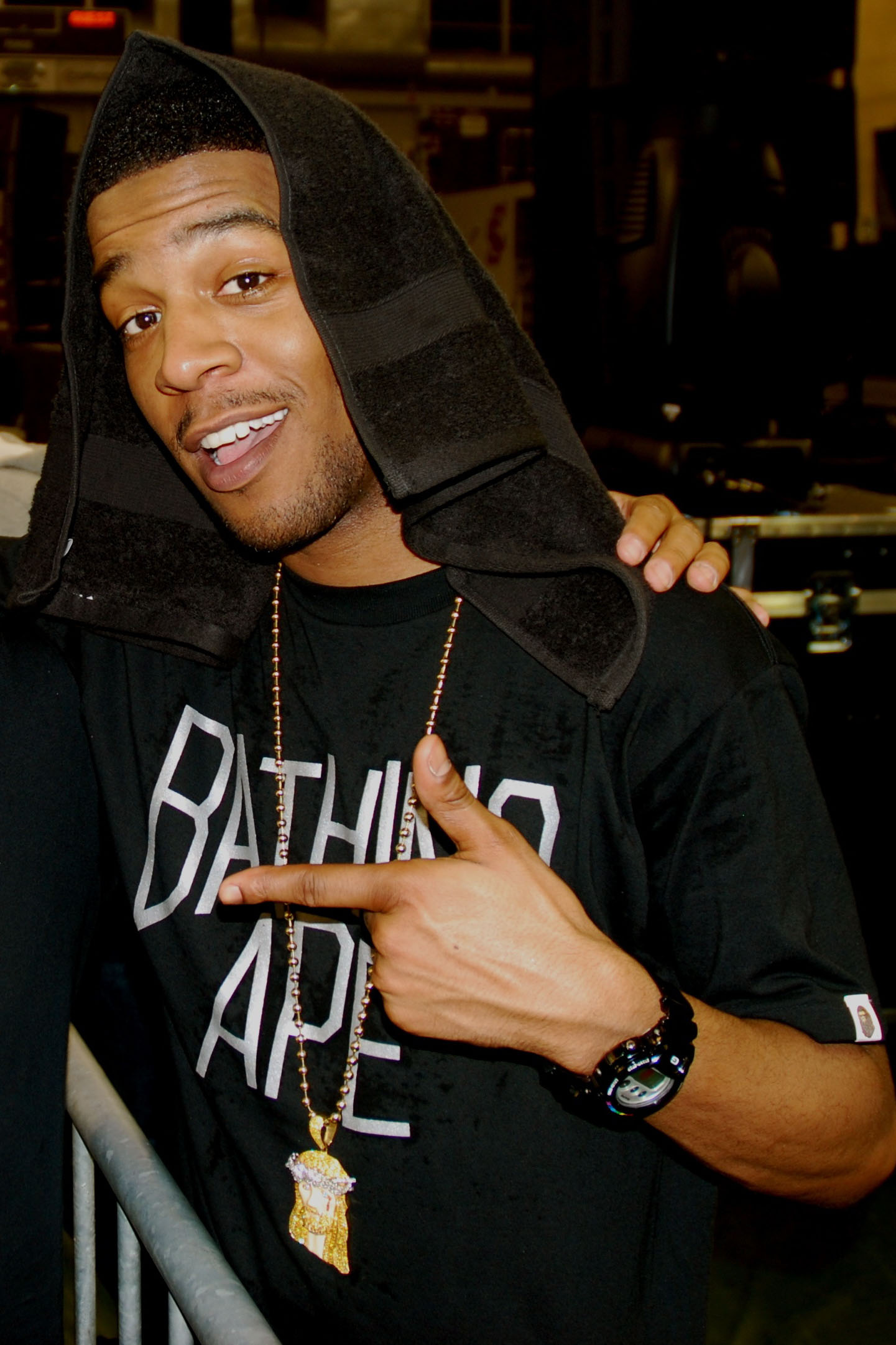
"Free" was co-written by Kid Cudi (pictured).

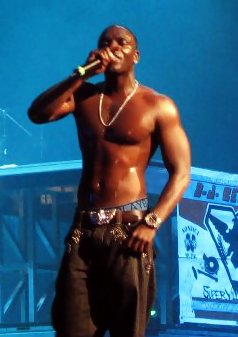
"Mirrors" was co-written by Akon (pictured).

Key
†	Indicates single release
#	Indicates promotional single release
‡	Indicates song written solely by Kills

Song	Artist(s)	Writer(s)	Album	Year	Ref.
"Acid Annie"	Natalia Kills	Natalia Kills; Martin Kierszenbaum	Perfectionist	2011	
"Activate My Heart" #	Natalia Kills	Natalia Kills; Martin Kierszenbaum	—N/a	2010	
"Body Body Language"	Natalia Kills	‡ Natalia Kills	Womannequin	2008	
"Boys Don't Cry"	Natalia Kills	Natalia Kills; Jeff Bhasker	Trouble	2013	
"Break You Hard"	Natalia Kills	Natalia Kills; Theron Feemster	Perfectionist	2011	
"Broke"	Natalia Kills	Natalia Kills; Fernando Garibay; Dion Wilson	Perfectionist	2011	
"Champagne Showers" †	LMFAO featuring Natalia Kills	Stefan Gordy; Skyler Gordy; David Listenbee; Kenneth Oliver	Sorry for Party Rocking	2011	
"Chivalry Is Dead"	Natalia Kills	‡ Natalia Kills	Womannequin	2008	
"Controversy"	Natalia Kills	Natalia Kills; Jeff Bhasker; Guillaume Doubet	Trouble	2013	
"Daddy's Girl"	Natalia Kills	Natalia Kills; Guillaume Doubet; Daryl Hall	Trouble	2013	
"Devils Don't Fly"	Natalia Kills	Natalia Kills; Jeff Bhasker; Glass John	Trouble	2013	
"Don't Play Nice" †	Natalia Kills	‡ Natalia Kills	—N/a	2005	
"Free" †	Natalia Kills	Natalia Kills; Jeff Bhasker; Scott Mescudi; Dion Wilson	Perfectionist	2011	
"Heaven"	Natalia Kills	Natalia Kills; Jeff Bhasker	Perfectionist	2011	
"If I Was God"	Natalia Kills	Natalia Kills; Theron Feemster	Perfectionist	2011	
"Just Play That Track"	Space Cowboy featuring Natalia Kills	Nick Dresti	Digital Rock Star	2009	
"Kill My Boyfriend" †	Natalia Kills	Natalia Kills; Junior Caldera; Julien Carret	Perfectionist	2011	
"Lights Out (Go Crazy)" †	Junior Caldera featuring Natalia Kills and Far East Movement	Jerome Dumas; Julien Carret; Natalia Kills; Kevin Nishimura; James Roh; Michael Stevenson; Virman Coquia	Dirty Bass	2012	
"Love Is a Suicide"	Natalia Kills	Natalia Kills; Fernando Garibay; Michael Warren	Perfectionist	2011	
"Marlboro Lights"	Natalia Kills	Natalia Kills; Jeff Bhasker	Trouble	2013	
"Mirrors" †	Natalia Kills	Natalia Kills; Martin Kierszenbaum; Akon; Giorgio Tuinfort	Perfectionist	2011	
"No Champagne"	Frankmusik featuring Natalia Kills	Frankmusik; Martin Kierszenbaum	Do It in the AM	2011	
"Not in Love"	Natalia Kills	Natalia Kills; Martin Kierszenbaum	Perfectionist	2011	
"Nothing Lasts Forever"	Natalia Kills featuring Billy Kraven	Natalia Kills; Jeff Bhasker	Perfectionist	2011	
"Numerology"	Natalia Kills	‡ Natalia Kills	Womannequin	2008	
"Outta Time" #	Natalia Kills	Natalia Kills; Jeff Bhasker	Trouble	2013	
"Perfection"	Natalia Kills	‡ Natalia Kills	Perfectionist	2011	
"Plain Jane"	Natalia Kills	‡ Natalia Kills	Womannequin	2008	
"Problem" †	Natalia Kills	Natalia Kills; Jeff Bhasker; Guillaume Doubet; Sky Montique	Trouble	2013	
"Rabbit Hole"	Natalia Kills	Natalia Kills; Jeff Bhasker; Guillaume Doubet	Trouble	2013	
"Real Woman"	Natalia Kills	‡ Natalia Kills	Womannequin	2008	
"Saturday Night" †	Natalia Kills	Natalia Kills; Jeff Bhasker	Trouble	2013	
"Stop Me"	Natalia Kills	Natalia Kills; Jeff Bhasker; Emile Haynie	Trouble	2013	
"Superficial"	Natalia Kills	Natalia Kills; Theron Feemster	Perfectionist	2011	
"Television"	Natalia Kills	Natalia Kills; Jeff Bhasker; Guillaume Doubet	Trouble	2013	
"They Talk Shit About Me" †	M. Pokora featuring Natalia Kills	M. Pokora; Pete Martin; Natalia Kills	MP3	2008	
"Trouble"	Natalia Kills	Natalia Kills; Jeff Bhasker	Trouble	2013	
"Watching You"	Natalia Kills	Natalia Kills; Jeff Bhasker	Trouble	2013	
"Wonderland" †	Natalia Kills	Natalia Kills; Jeff Bhasker; Michael Warren; Theron Feemster	Perfectionist	2011	
"You Can't Get In My Head (If You Don't Get In My Head)" †	DJ Tatana featuring Natalia Kills	Martin Kierszenbaum; Natalia Kills; Tatana Sterba; Timo Loosli	Heart	2011	
"Zombie" #	Natalia Kills	Natalia Kills; Jeff Bhasker	Perfectionist	2011	
"1974"	The Knux featuring Natalia Kills	Kentrell Lindsey; Alvin Lindsey; Lyrica Anderson	Eraser	2011	
"2 Is Better" #	Far East Movement featuring Natalia Kills and Ya Boy	—N/a	Free Wired	2010	

== See also ==
- Teddy Sinclair discography
