= Problem (Natalia Kills song) =

2013 single by Natalia Kills

Single by Natalia Kills

from the album Trouble
- Released: 12 March 2013
- Genre: Pop
- Length: 3:43
- Label: Interscope
- Songwriters: Natalia Kills; Jeff Bhasker; Guillaume Doubet; Sky Montique
- Producers: Jeff Bhasker; Guillaume Doubet; Emile Haynie

Natalia Kills singles chronology
"Kill My Boyfriend" (2012)	"Problem" (2013)	"Saturday Night" (2013)

Music video
- "Problem" on YouTube

"Problem" is a song by English singer Natalia Kills from her second studio album, Trouble (2013). It was released on 12 March 2013 as the album's lead single. The song has been used in films such as Pitch Perfect 2 and We're the Millers.

== Composition ==
"Problem" is written in common-time in E♭ minor at a tempo of 85 bpm. With a vocal melody spanning from E♭_{3} to B♭_{4}, the harmony stays on an E♭ pedal for the duration of the song. The song marked a shift in Kills's style, incorporating a grungy garage rock influence to her established pop sound.

== Music video ==
The music video for "Problem" was filmed in Los Angeles. Kills and her producer Guillaume Doubet co-directed the video, with Jacob Abrams as director of photography. The music video, released on 24 June 2013, features Canadian model Adonis Bosso as Kills's love interest.

The video opens with police cars and the sound of sirens blaring. Kills engages in physical intimacy with her love interest in a variety of locations, including in a hotel room, in a convenience store, and in the back seat of a police car. In another scene, Kills masturbates in a public phone booth while participating in phone sex. At the song's climax, Kills sets fire to her fur coat. The video ends after a young girl spray paints a wall in an alley with Kills's face and the word "problem".
