= Trouble (Natalia Kills album) =

Studio album by Natalia Kills
- Released: 3 September 2013
- Recorded: 2012–13; New York and Los Angeles
- Genre: Synth-pop
- Length: 53:54
- Labels: will.i.am; Cherrytree; Interscope
- Producers: Jeff Bhasker; Guillaume Doubet; Emile Haynie; Glass John

Natalia Kills chronology
Perfectionist (2011)	Trouble (2013)

Singles from Trouble
- 1. "Problem" Released: 12 March 2013; 2. "Saturday Night" Released: 28 June 2013; 3. "Trouble" Released: 8 April 2014

Trouble is the second and final studio album by English singer-songwriter Natalia Kills. (Note: Trouble is Kills' final album as a soloist, as she changed her name to Teddy Sinclair and formed the band Cruel Youth.) It was released on 3 September 2013 by Cherrytree Records through will.i.am Music Group and Interscope. Recording for the album started in early 2012 and took place in Los Angeles and New York. During that time, Sinclair was accompanied by producers including Jeff Bhasker, who served as Trouble's executive producer and handled the production, instrumentation and songwriting.

In comparison with the sound and lyrical content of Kills' debut album Perfectionist (2011), Trouble has a heavier atmosphere driven by electric guitars and strong percussion. The lyrics were largely co-written by Kills and Bhasker and explore the singer's difficult childhood and adolescence. Kills designed the album's cover art, which symbolizes its main themes. Upon release, music critics commended the album's cohesion and perceived an evolution in Kills' songwriting.

The album was announced with the release of a music video for "Controversy" in September 2012. Three singles were commissioned from Trouble; they were accompanied by respective music videos. The release of "Problem" and "Saturday Night" preceded the album's release; later, a remix of the album's title track served as its third single. With the exception of the US Billboard 200, where it peaked at number 70, the album failed to chart internationally.

== Background and recording ==
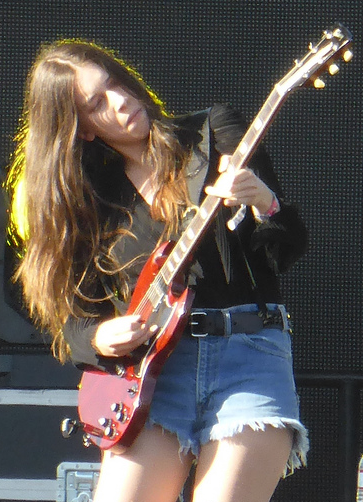
Danielle Haim played guitar for Trouble

Kills began recording new material in the year after the release of her debut studio album Perfectionist, which was mostly produced by Martin Kierszenbaum and Jeff Bhasker, and was released in March 2011 to mixed critical reception. It yielded three singles which, like their parent album, performed moderately on European charts.

During 2012 and 2013, Kills participated in other musical endeavours, including group collaborations. She provided guest vocals for Far East Movement's song "2 Is Better" and on The Knux's "1974". Kills featured on "Champagne Showers" by LMFAO, which became a mild international success, and collaborated with DJ Tatana on his single "You Can't Get In My Head (If You Don't Get In My Bed)".

The bulk of Trouble was conceptualised at Enormous Studios in Los Angeles, and some tracks were finished at Record Plant and the New York City-based Jungle City Studios. Compared with Perfectionist's roster of eight producers, Trouble used four, including Guillaume Doubet, Glass John and HaynieKills—all of who Kills worked with for the first time.

Bhasker was assigned for executive production and other tasks, including production, instrumentation and programming, and post-production. He said his production on Trouble is "some of his best work" that has "dark angles". Bhasker recorded background vocals for some tracks, including "Devils Don't Fly" and "Problem". The electric guitar was recorded by Danielle Haim and Jimmy Messer, and Haynie played the keyboards. Doubet, Haynie and American producer Mike Will handled the record's programming; Messer, Pawel Sek Tyler Sam Johnson and Rob Suchecki served as engineers for some songs of the album. Bhasker and Tony Maserati mixed Trouble while Chris Athens controlled the mastering process at his eponymous studio.

== Composition ==
"Problem"
"Problem" is a pop song that is styled in pop rock and garage rock.

"Saturday Night"
Written by Kills and Bhasker, "Saturday Night" was noted by critics for its autobiographical lyricism, which depicts the former's childhood.

According to Kills, Trouble represents a substantial departure from her debut album. Kills described its sound as a cross between hip-hop-like strong percussion with electric guitar-driven instrumentals. Writing for The New Zealand Herald, Paula Yeoman called the album's music "darker pop", while finding it resembles the works of Lana Del Rey, Lady Gaga and Gwen Stefani. AllMusic's Matt Collar wrote that the overall sound of the album was influenced by Stefani, Grimes and Courtney Love.

The themes of Trouble deviate from those of Perfectionist; while the latter explores Kills' ambitions and perfectionism, the former is about her upbringing and adolescence, when she left her home and engaged in dangerous behaviour. Kills stated that the album reflects her experiences as a teenager and her feelings of powerlessness motivated by her lack of identification with recent, upbeat popular music. She regarded this attempt as difficult because it involved confronting past problems, although Kills recognised that they defined her personality. She stated, "once [she] started writing, [she] couldn't stop" and compared the process to a "confession".

"Television" and "Rabbit Hole" contrast their dark, "sinister" lyricism with their uptempo production. "Television", which Romy Olutski of Harper's Bazaar described as a "more alternative" song, opens with police sirens and progressively introduces guitars and percussion using a vocoder effect. "Rabbit Hole" contains explicit references to recreational drugs and sexual intercourse, and uses the phrase "falling down a rabbit hole" as a metaphor for infatuation. The pop-styled "Problem" is influenced by garage and pop rock; the latter is incorporated in the album's title track, in which Kills adopts a raw and "exhausted" vocal style and is backed by "arena rock choirs".

"Daddy's Girl" places a sample of American duo Hall & Oates' single "Rich Girl" over a "thumping beat". Described as a "love song", it discusses her mother's support of and devotion to Kills' father when he was incarcerated. Second single "Saturday Night" employs synthesizers on a new wave-based instrumental. The track is autobiographical and discusses Kills's childhood experiences of domestic abuse; Kills said it symbolises "feeling OK when everything is not". The only ballads on Trouble are the piano-led track "Devils Don't Fly", and the organ and keyboards-based track "Marlboro Lights". Writing for MuchMusic, journalist Allison noted Motown influences on the melancholic love song "Outta Time".

== Release and promotion ==
Trouble was announced through a music video for its first promotional single "Controversy", which was released in mid-September 2012. During an interview with Glamour, Kills said it serves as an introductory track to the album "because it's a verbal collage of things we see on a daily basis that we turn a blind eye to, especially in the Internet age, where you can literally see anything and everything instantly ... We all laugh and joke when it's someone else's suffering". The album's first single, "Problem", was digitally released by Interscope in mid-March 2013, followed in June by its music video. The same month, "Saturday Night" was chosen as Trouble's second single.

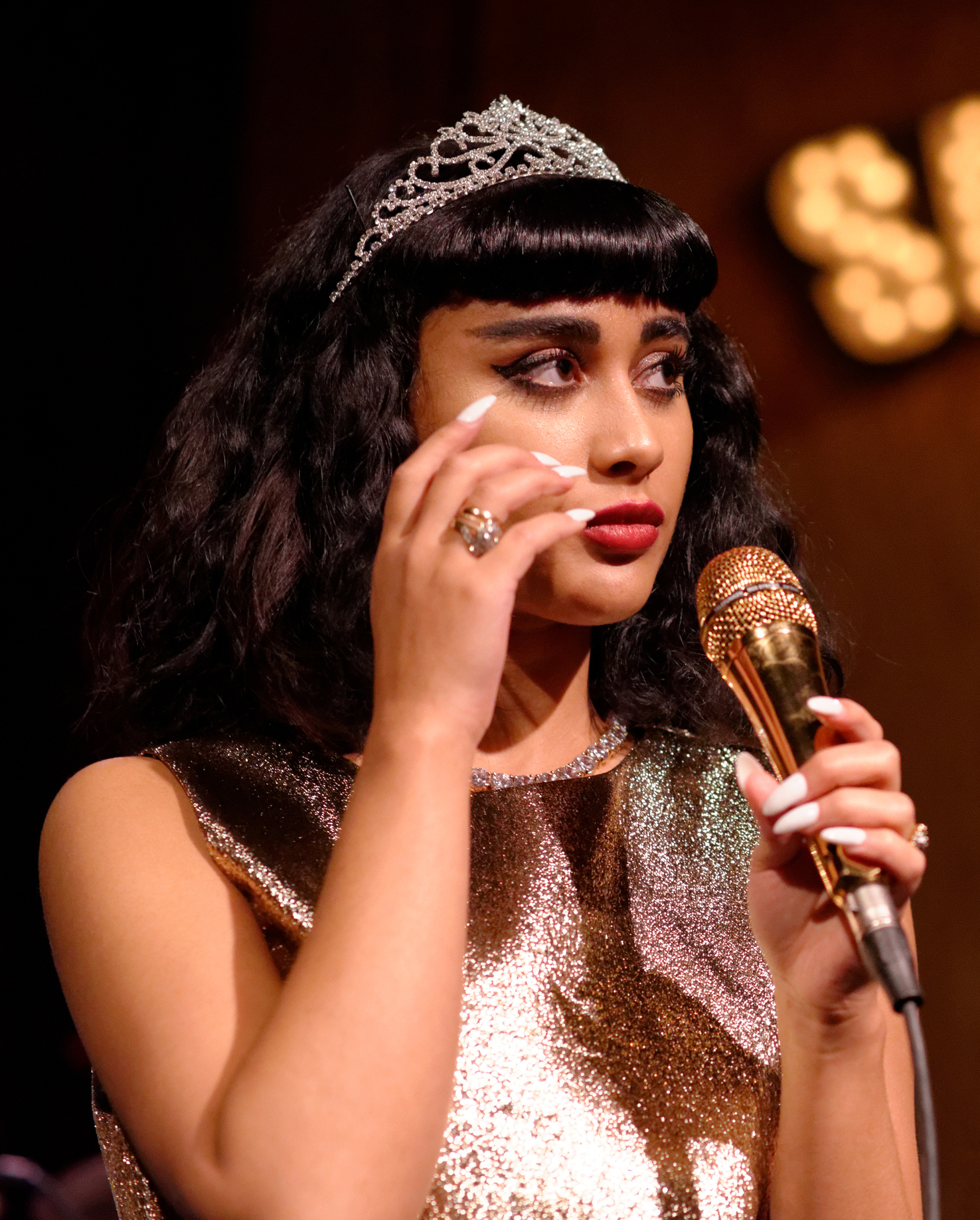
Kills performing at The Bootleg Theater

Kills attended an after-party for the 2013 MTV Video Music Awards, held on 25 August 2013 in Brooklyn, New York City, where she performed several songs from Trouble; she devised her performance to be "remotely accurate" to the sound and packaging of the album. Trouble was officially released on 3 September 2013 as a digital download in the United States and Canada. A CD release proceeded in the US and Canada on 10 and 17 September 2013. "Outta Time" was released as the album's second promotional single, free of charge, coinciding with the US release of Trouble. On the same day, a lyric video for the song was released on YouTube.

For the US release of Trouble, "Boys Don't Cry" was premiered on the website of the magazine Glamour. On 18 October 2013, a remix of the song was made available on Cosmopolitan. Following the album release, Kills was interviewed by a number of magazines and websites, including Billboard, Teen Vogue, Refinery29, and Playboy. On 9 October 2013, Kills performed at a Chicago nightclub and on 31 December 2013 she performed at the Hollywood Roosevelt Hotel. She also performed an acoustic set for Yahoo! Music. During a promotional trip in New Zealand, Kills appeared at the Vodafone New Zealand Music Awards.

== Reception ==
Professional ratings
Review scores
Source	Rating
AllMusic	3.5/5 stars
Idolator	4/5 stars
The New Zealand Herald	3.5/5 stars

Matt Collar of AllMusic awarded Trouble a rating of three and a half stars out of five, calling it a "pantomime that artists have been trying to pull off ever since Madonna sang about a sexual experience so revelatory it gave her back her virginity". He noted that Kills' personality, although similar to that of Pink and Lady Gaga, was "enough ... to keep your attention". Writing for Idolator, Sam Lansky highlighted Bhasker's production, which he credited for making the album cohesive. Lansky said Kills had evolved as a songwriter and had given legitimacy and "richness" to Trouble'ssongs. So So Gay Magazine praised Trouble as an evolution from her previous album Perfectionist and stated that Kills "remains largely unknown and underrated; astonishing considering the quality of her two albums. She’s definitely some sort of anti-princess of pop."

Writing for The New Zealand Herald, Paula Yeoman stated that pop listeners "should pay attention to" the album, to which she gave a rating of three and a half points out of five. Mike Wass of Idolator chose Trouble as his favourite album of 2013, while David Byrne and Tony Peregrin for Windy City Times said the album was one of 2013's "excellent efforts".

== Commercial performance ==
Trouble entered the US Billboard 200 at number 70, becoming Kills' highest-peaking album on that chart. It opened with sales of 6,000 copies, almost half of Perfectionist's total sales, and left the chart the following week.

== Track listing ==
Song credits obtained from the liner notes of Trouble.

No.	Title	Writer(s)	Producer(s)	Length
1.	"Television"	Natalia Kills; Jeff Bhasker; Guillaume Doubet	Bhasker; Doubet^{[a]}	5:54
2.	"Problem"	Kills; Bhasker; Doubet; Sky Montique	Bhasker; Doubet^{[a]}; Emile Haynie^{[b]}	3:43
3.	"Stop Me"	Kills; Bhasker; Haynie	Haynie; Bhasker	3:45
4.	"Boys Don't Cry"	Kills; Bhasker	Bhasker; Haynie^{[b]}	3:36
5.	"Daddy's Girl"	Kills; Doubet; Daryl Hall	Bhasker; Doubet^{[a]}	3:33
6.	"Saturday Night"	Kills; Bhasker	Bhasker	4:46
7.	"Devils Don't Fly"	Kills; Bhasker; Glass John	Bhasker; Glass John^{[a]}	4:37
8.	"Outta Time"	Kills; Bhasker	Bhasker	3:42
9.	"Controversy"	Kills; Bhasker; Doubet	Bhasker; Doubet^{[a]}	4:51
10.	"Rabbit Hole"	Kills; Bhasker; Doubet	Bhasker; Doubet^{[a]}; Glass John^{[b]}	3:14
11.	"Watching You"	Kills; Bhasker; Haynie	Haynie; Bhasker	3:49
12.	"Marlboro Lights"	Kills; Bhasker	Bhasker	4:05
13.	"Trouble"	Kills; Bhasker	Bhasker; Haynie^{[b]}; Doubet^{[b]}	4:19
Total length:				53:54

Notes

- ^{^a} denotes a co-producer
- ^{^b} denotes an additional producer

Sample Credits

- "Daddy's Girl" contains elements and excerpts from "Rich Girl", as performed by Hall & Oates and written by Daryl Hall from the album Bigger than Both of Us.

== Credits and personnel ==
Credits adapted from the liner notes of Trouble.

- Jeff Bhasker – production, programming, guitar, keyboards, engineering, mixing, piano, organ, background vocals, executive production
- Guillaume Doubet – co-production, programming
- Natalia Kills – vocals
- Glass John – programming, co-production
- Pawel Sek – engineering, background vocals
- Tony Maserati – mixing
- Chris Tabron – mixing
- Justin Hergett – mixing assistant
- James Krausse – mixing assistant
- Chris Athens – mastering
- Emile Haynie – additional production, programming, production, keyboards
- Mike Will – programming
- Tyler Sam Johnson – engineering
- Rob Suchecki – engineering
- Jimmy Messer – guitar, engineering
- Danielle Haim – guitar

== Charts ==
Chart (2013)	Peak position
US Billboard 200	70

== Release history ==
Region	Date	Format(s)	Label
United States	3 September 2013	Digital download	Cherrytree; will.i.am; Interscope
Canada	3 September 2013	Digital download	Universal
Australia	6 September 2013	Digital download	Universal
Germany	6 September 2013	Digital download	Universal
Czech Republic	9 September 2013	Digital download	Universal
United Kingdom	9 September 2013	Digital download	Polydor
France	9 September 2013	Digital download	Universal
Spain	9 September 2013	Digital download	Universal
Italy	9 September 2013	Digital download	Universal
United States	10 September 2013	CD	Cherrytree; will.i.am; Interscope
Canada	17 September 2013	CD	Universal
United States	12 December 2025	Vinyl	
