= Trouble (Natalia Kills song) =

2013 song by Natalia Kills

Song by Natalia Kills

from the album Trouble
- Released: 3 September 2013
- Studio: Enormous Studios (Los Angeles, California); Record Plant (Los Angeles, California)
- Genre: Pop rock; arena rock
- Length: 4:19
- Label: will.i.am; Cherrytree; Interscope
- Songwriters: Natalia Kills; Jeff Bhasker
- Producer: Jeff Bhasker

"Trouble" is a song recorded by English singer and songwriter Natalia Kills for her second studio album of the same name (2013), appearing on it as its closing track. The song's lyrics were written about bad behavior and trouble, while musically, "Trouble" is a midtempo '90s-esque pop rock number that emulates arena rock. The overall sound of the song was praised by contemporary music critics, who also highlighted its placement on the album track listing.

The song has been performed by Kills in some live events. Despite not having been released as a single, director Emile Rafael filmed a video for "Trouble", that explores Kills and her on-screen boyfriend's use of recreational drugs and their relationship; it was released in February 2014. Martin Kierszenbaum produced a remix of "Trouble" which features electronic musician Peaches.

== Background and release ==
"Trouble" was recorded at Enormous Studios and Record Plant, both located in Los Angeles, California. It was written by Kills and American record producer Jeff Bhasker, who also produced the song. Additional production was provided by Emile Haynie and Guillaume Doubet, who along with Bhasker, programmed all the musical instruments played in the song. Guitars were played by Bhasker and Jimmy Messer; keyboards and background vocals were helmed by the former. He also mixed the song. Audio engineering was handled by Bhasker and Pawel Sek, while mastering was done by Chris Athens at the Chris Athens Masters, located in Austin, Texas.

"Trouble" was first unveiled online on the same day of the release of its eponymous parent album, on the website Idolator. The release of an official third single for the album was made with the announcement of a fan contest, in which fans were asked to design or draw "interpretations" of the singer, however no winners were announced as of April 2014. The track was also included in the 2014 compilation Now That's What I Call Music! 49. While Idolator has also referred to it as the album's third single, no official release proceeded.

== Composition and reception ==
Musically, "Trouble" is an anthemic midtempo song, that is styled in the genre of 90s influenced pop rock. The singer's voice in the song was deemed "raspier" and "more exhausted" than in the other album tracks, which are also heard during the "singalong hook". The song's instrumentation utilizes stadium drums, guitars and keyboards, while background vocals resemblant of choirs—and serve as arena rock elements—sing "whoas" repeatedly. Lyrically, Kills speaks of bad behavior and trouble, while searching an alibi and a friend. Jake Buck of Vada described it as being "the perfect ending to represent the album’s entire theme of badass, rawness, [and] honesty". Bradley Stern from MuuMuse described it as "Ryan Tedder-meets-Fun" while observing that the "cinematic quality" of Lana Del Rey's music was present in the track.

Idolator editor Sam Lansky was very positive about "Trouble", favoring the "anthemic sound", which he described as evoking the catalog of English indie rock band Florence and the Machine. Bradley Stern from MuuMuse deemed it a "perfect way to close a celebration of imperfection", and compared it to the music of the band fun. For MTV Buzzworthy, Stern listed the song as second in his list of the "5 Must-Hear Pop Songs Of The Week".

== Music video ==
Emile Rafael directed the official music video for "Trouble", with cinematography by Charlie Herranz. During an interview with Elle, Kills talked on the concept she went with for the visual. Kills revealed that she left her birthplace of Bradford in England at the age of 14, in order to pursue her desire of having a better life, with a good boyfriend and life; however she only felt "closer to betterness" in parties, where she was exposed to recreational drugs. She started to consume them and she felt better with them for "a few short hours". "They make you feel better, so the minute the high wears off you want more. But what's wrong with wanting more?", Kills reflected. "More happiness, more power or freedom or love if you know that it's obtainable without the hard work, rejection and bullshit? [.....] Sometimes it feels that reality is bad—much worse than the drug that helps you escape it for a few short hours." She further explained that she wanted to create an "honest video that showed both [her] realities with all the disaster, delusion, and desire." The video was released on 19 February 2014 on Kills' Vevo and YouTube accounts.

The video begins with Kills walking around on a bridge, as she reminisces about her relationship with her boyfriend. As the song builds up to the first verse, they are depicted in the living room of a hazy-looking apartment, and Kills smiles at him, who kisses her. They start to involve physically, however he pushes her away and opts to smoke a cigar; Kills, simultaneously, takes several pills. As they start to hallucinate, images of dilated pupils appear quickly on the screen and they are shown on the same setting dressed formally. They leave the apartment and drive to a bar—still smoking—and as they reach there, Kills observes an empty stage and decides to sing there. She keeps hallucinating and sees herself in a golden dress as opposed to what she is actually dressing—a black T-shirt. As she continues to sing, a short-haired man who is watching her performance smiles at her and hits on her. Kills' on-screen boyfriend walks up to him and they start a fight while Kills sings. A few moments after, Kills—who was oblivious to the fight—tries to break them up but gets hit by her boyfriend, and leaves the bar crying. He pursues her and they both argue inside their car. They abruptly stop arguing and begin having sexual intercourse. As the song reaches its end, Kills and her boyfriend are again in their apartment, where she spills a bottle of vodka on the ground. After looking at him, she lights it which causes the apartment to burn.

Writing for MTV News, Brad Stern opined that the visual was a "big Parental Advisory warning in motion" due to its explicit themes, and found it resemblant of Quentin Tarantino's filmography. Idolator's Mike Wass deemed the video "visually arresting" and recognized it as Kills' "most fully realized" videoclip.

== Live performances ==
On 21 November 2013, Kills performed album songs "Trouble", "Saturday Night" and "Marlboro Lights" at the studios of New Zealand radio station The Edge. In February of the following year, Kills performed at the Cherrytree Records House lounge. During the performance, Kills sung in an acoustic setting, where she was accompanied solely by a guitar. Bradley Stern from Idolator praised her vocal performance—he wrote that she had previously "prove[n] herself as a capable live vocalist" and that the Cherrytree House performance was "no exception".

== Credits and personnel ==
Recording places

- Recorded at Enormous Studios and Record Plant (Los Angeles, California)
- Mastered at Chris Athens Masters (Austin, Texas).

Personnel

- Songwriting – Natalia Kills and Jeff Bhasker
- Production – Jeff Bhasker
- Additional production – Emile Haynie and Guillaume Doubet
- Guitar – Jeff Bhasker and Jimmy Messer
- Keyboards – Jeff Bhasker
- Programming – Guillaume Doubet, Jeff Bhasker and Emile Haynie
- Background vocals – Jeff Bhasker
- Engineering – Jeff Bhasker and Pawel Sek
- Assistant at Record Plant – Ben Rice
- Mixing – Jeff Bhasker

Credits adapted from the liner notes of Trouble, Cherrytree Records.

== Remix ==
"Trouble"

Single by Natalia Kills featuring Peaches

from the album Trouble
- Released: 8 April 2014
- Length: 4:57
- Label: will.i.am; Cherrytree; Interscope
- Songwriters: Natalia Kills; Jeff Bhasker
- Producer: Martin Kierszenbaum

Natalia Kills singles chronology
"Saturday Night" (2013)	"Trouble" (2014)	"Diamond Days" (2016)

Peaches singles chronology
"Burst!" (2012)	"Trouble" (2014)	""Light in Places""

"Trouble" was remixed by record producer Martin "Cherry Cherry Boom Boom" Kierszenbaum to feature guest vocals from Canadian electronic musician Peaches. Kills had already worked with Kierszenbaum in her debut studio album, Perfectionist (2011) however he did not produce Trouble. This version—dubbed the "Cherry Cherry Boom Boom Remix"—maintains writing credits for Kills and Bhasker and plays at the length of four minutes and 57 seconds.

The remixed version of the song premiered online, on 21 February 2014, through an article by American magazine Nylon. Since its online release, it became popular on social networking websites, peaking at number one on The Hype Machine's Twitter chart. Its digital release only occurred nearly one month and a half later in the United States, on 8 April 2014. In Germany, it was released one day later.
