= Kiss It Better =

2016 single by Rihanna

Single by Rihanna

from the album Anti
- Released: March 30, 2016
- Recorded: 2014
- Studio: Jungle City, New York City
- Genre: Synth-rock; R&B
- Length: 4:13
- Label: Roc Nation; Westbury Road
- Songwriters: Jeff Bhasker; John Glass; Teddy Sinclair; Robyn Fenty
- Producer: Jeff Bhasker

Rihanna singles chronology
"Work" (2016)	"Kiss It Better" and "Needed Me" (2016)	"This Is What You Came For" (2016)

Music video
- Kiss It Better on YouTube

"Kiss It Better" is a song by the Barbadian singer Rihanna from her eighth album, Anti (2016). It was written and produced by Jeff Bhasker and Glass John, with additional writing by Teddy Sinclair and Rihanna. The song was serviced to radio stations in the United States on March 30, 2016, together with "Needed Me". "Kiss It Better" is a synth-rock and R&B ballad, which features influences from the 1980s and 1990s-music ballads. The song's lyrics focus on a destructive relationship that the singer finds irresistible. It also deals with themes of mending broken fences and getting back together with a lover.

The single received critical acclaim, with critics praising its 1980s style ballad, lyrics, and Rihanna's vocals. It received a Grammy Award nomination for Best R&B Song at the 59th ceremony. "Kiss It Better" peaked at number 62 on the US Billboard Hot 100 chart and was certified 4x Platinum by the Recording Industry Association of America (RIAA). It also reached number four on the South African radio chart. The song's music video was directed by fashion photographer Craig McDean and premiered on March 31, 2016. The video was inspired by dadaism and surrealism, and depicts Rihanna against a dark background. The song was included on the Anti World Tour setlist as the closing song.

In January 2021, the song gained notoriety again on radio and TikTok with the release of rapper Fat Joe's single "Sunshine (The Light)" featuring DJ Khaled and Amorphous. The song heavily samples the first verse of "Kiss It Better" as its chorus, using Rihanna's vocals.

== Background and release ==
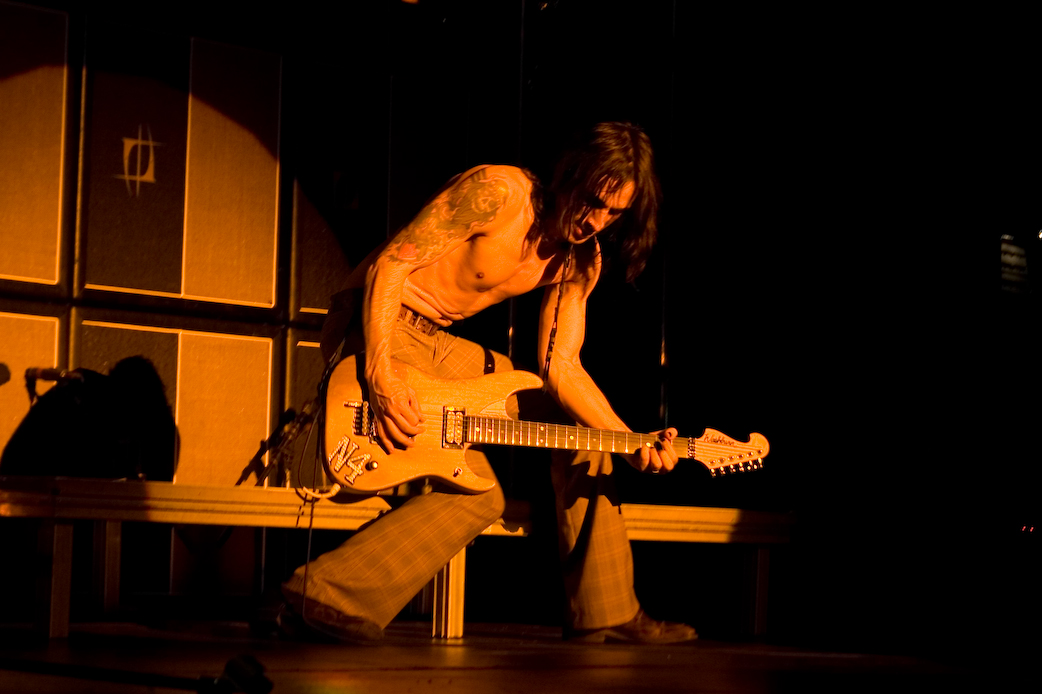
Musician Nuno Bettencourt played guitar on the track.

On December 8, 2014, "Kiss It Better" was registered through Harry Fox Agency, an agency "who handles publishing rights for physical and digital music formats." The same day, Australian FM radio station 2Day FM and other websites reported that the song was allegedly going to be released as the lead single of her then-upcoming eight studio album. A day later, Rihanna teased a snippet of the track on her Instagram account, featuring Extreme's guitarist Nuno Bettencourt working on a solo electric melody. On July 7, 2015, English singer Teddy Sinclair confirmed she was one of the songwriters of the song.

On December 27, 2015, Glass John, who also co-wrote and co-produced the song, via Twitter expressed his dissatisfaction about the delay of the song's release and its parent album. He eventually leaked a minute-long demo of the song and also described it as "the best damn song." Through her Twitter account, Rihanna confirmed that "Kiss It Better" alongside "Needed Me" were going to be released as the follow-up singles from Anti (2016) and impacted radio on March 30, 2016. She also revealed the artwork for both singles, with "Kiss It Better" having a close-up of Rihanna's face.

== Composition and lyrical interpretation ==
"Kiss It Better"
"Kiss It Better" is characterized by critics as a synth-rock and R&B power ballad reminiscent of the 1980s music scene by incorporating electric guitar in its composition.

"Kiss It Better" was written and produced by Jeff Bhasker and Glass John, while Sinclair and Rihanna provided additional writing. The song was recorded at the Jungle City Studios in New York City. American producer Kuk Harrell provided the vocal recording and vocal production of the song. Blake Mares was responsible for additional recording, while Brendan Morawski was the recording assistant. The mixing of the single was done by Manny Marroquin at the Larrabee Studios in North Hollywood; Chris Galland and Ike Schultz served as the mixing assistants. Bettencourt played the guitar and Chris Gehringer mastered it at the Sterling Sound Studios in New York City. "Kiss It Better" is a synth-rock and "electro-charged R&B" power ballad that lasts 4 minutes and 13 seconds. It is written in the key of F♯ major with an andante moderato tempo of 95 beats per minute. It features "deep snaking synths", "gleaming" electric guitar riffs and drums, that were influenced by 1980s and 1990s power ballads.

Lyrically, the song focus on a destructive relationship that the singer knows is wrong for her, but one she finds irresistible, which can be seen in the lines, "Who cares when it feels like crack?." In the chorus, she "hauntingly asks over and over, 'What are you willing to do? / Oh, tell me what you’re willing to do,'" in which she responds, "Kiss it, kiss it better, baby." During the song, she seeks reconciliation from a lover, and "relies on [sex] to smooth over a conflict," singing: "Mmm, do what you gotta do, keep me up all night." Julianne Shepherd of Billboard and Adam R. Holz of Plugged In also noted that the song has themes of sex. Patrick Ryan of USA Today noted that her "sultry, towering vocals call to mind past hits 'Take a Bow' and 'Cheers (Drink to That)'. Billboard's Shepherd and Rolling Stone's Brittany Spanos found similarities between "Kiss It Better" and Prince's "Purple Rain", with Bianca Gracie of Idolator agreeing, adding that it also resembles TLC's "Red Light Special".

== Critical reception ==
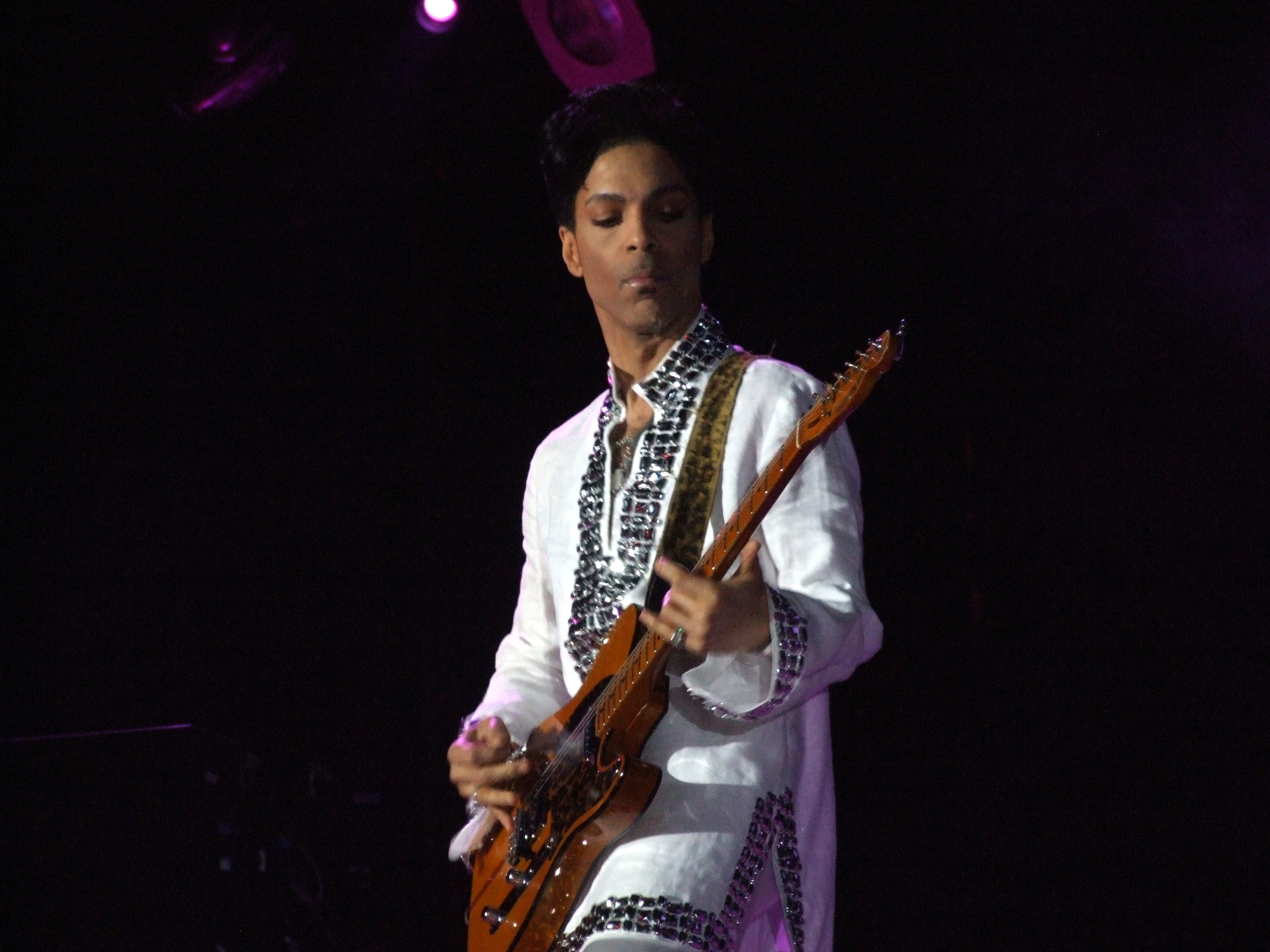
Multiple critics compared the song's musical direction to works by Prince.

"Kiss It Better" was highly acclaimed by music critics. Brittany Spanos of Rolling Stone called it "the album's most direct pop moment by far," describing it as a "shimmering, funky" track. Jordan Bassett of NME agreed, calling it "the album’s best and most full-bodied track, replete with snaking synths and two swooning, overlapping vocal refrains." AllMusic's Stephen Thomas Erlewine and USA Today's Patrick Ryan both agreed that the song was an album highlight, with Ryan adding that it was "perhaps Rihanna's best shot at scaling the pop charts with Anti and praised the "effectively catchy" hook. Chris Gerard of PopMatters defined it as "a moment of classic Rihanna—edgy, soulful and confident, complimenting the "sinuous melody" and the "terrific vocal arrangement." Spin's editors Safy-Hallan Farah and Eve Barlow named it "a highlight" and "as triumphant a Prince jam as it gets" respectively. Zach Bernstein of Pretty Much Amazing observed that the song is "one of ANTI’s best offerings and a pure shot of old-school Rihanna—a stuttering, hypnotic beat, complimented [sic] by a hard-rock guitar riff and an innuendo about as subtle as a sledgehammer."

Corbin Reiff of The A.V. Club was very positive with the "gorgeous array of ’80s power rock electric guitar lines," with Bianca Gracie of Idolator sharing the same sentiment, writing that "th[e] heartbreaking electric guitar riff alone deserves a couple of future nominations," and labelled it "one of the strongest tracks off ANTI" and "all-around beautifully intimate." Jeff Benjamin of Fuse also commended the "mesmerizing electric guitar riff." For Alexis Petridis, a writer of The Guardian, "Kiss It Better" is the "closest it comes to the stuff that Stargate or Sia Furler have sold her in the past," due to the "ineffaceable chorus." Jon Caramanica of The New York Times considered it "an ostentatious sex jam" and "one of several songs on 'Anti' on which Rihanna's singing takes center stage." In a positive note, Nolan Feeney of Time went on to call it a "stellar slow-jam [that] opens with a guitar solo straight out of the ‘80s, but if today’s high school seniors are smart, they'll put this on their prom playlists." Jessica McKinney of Vibe appreciated the track due to "the rock-inspired vibe [and] the desperation in her voice that makes the song feel so heavy and ultimately enjoyable." Claire Lobenfeld of Fact defended the song for being "one of many examples of how Rihanna has refined her ability to do romantic despondency with confident precision. Instead of washing those feelings in huge productions, everything is stripped down to its emotional core."

"Kiss It Better" received a nomination for Best R&B Song at the 59th Annual Grammy Awards. Paste considered it the thirteenth-best song on their "50 Best Songs of 2016" list. Billboard named the single the second best on their list Best R&B Songs of 2016, while later placing it at number 51 on their "100 Best Pop Songs of 2016" list. In the annual Village Voice's Pazz & Jop mass critics poll of the year's best in music in 2016, "Kiss It Better" was ranked at number 29, tied with Maren Morris' "My Church" and The Weeknd's "Starboy".

== Commercial performance ==
In the United States, "Kiss It Better" debuted at number 80 on the US Billboard Hot 100 chart dating April 23, 2016, following the release of the song's music video. Its debut was driven primarily by streaming (73 percent of its chart points), which saw a 31 percent to 4.8 million U.S. streams. It also opened at number thirty-six on the US Pop Songs, marking Rihanna's record-extending 43rd entry. It eventually peaked at number 62 on the chart dating May 28, 2016 and spent a total of 12 weeks on the Hot 100. Though it was the promotional focus at pop radio, "Kiss It Better" reached as far as number twenty-four on the Pop Songs chart, leading Def Jam Recordings to release "Needed Me" – an initially "urban radio priority" – to pop radio as well, due to its success. As of January 2021, "Kiss It Better" has accumulated over one 360 million and 313,000 downloads in the United States.

Although the single did not manage to chart on the New Zealand chart, it did manage to chart at number three on the New Zealand Heatseekers chart, which comprises that week's fastest-rising titles outside the Top 40 Singles Chart. In Australia, the song only spent one week inside the ARIA Charts, reaching number forty-eight. In the United Kingdom, the song fared better, spending 13 weeks inside the UK Singles Chart; it debuted at number fifty-one on the chart dated April 14, 2016, after the music video's release. A week later, the song descended to number sixty, before moving to number fifty-seven. After two weeks fluctuating on the charts, the song managed to move to number forty-six, which became its peak position. It later remained seven further weeks on the chart.

== Music video ==
There is something hypnotic about the song, the way some of it repeats and you don't know where is the beginning and end. It is very intimate in this sense and we wanted it to be about a very personal moment—both a physical journey through an abstract space and an inner reflection at the same time.

— Craig McDean talking to The Fader about shooting Rihanna only by herself in the video

The accompanying music video for "Kiss It Better" was directed by British fashion photographer Craig McDean and premiered on March 31, 2016. It was shot in Los Angeles over a "very long night". A teaser for the video was released a day earlier on March 30 via Rihanna's Vevo account on YouTube. Keeley Gould and Ciara Pardo served producers for the visual which was shot entirely in black-and-white. In an interview with The Fader, McDean explained that the inspiration for the video was based on ideas which were inspired by dadaism and surrealism, "It all comes from you as a person, your inner inspiration and ideas you've had inside for a lifetime."

Jessie Katz of Billboard described the storyline of the video, it "features the singer intermittently standing, writhing on the ground and floating through space through various stages of undress while she sings to the Prince-esque synth and electric guitar track. In fact, Rihanna is the entire video -- there's no backdrop at all." Cosmopolitan's Eliza Thompson wrote that "the clip shows Rihanna rolling around under sheets while dice roll up and down her body, writhing on the floor in sheer lingerie, and stripping off her oversize business-lady suit." According to McDean the idea to include dice in the video came from him and his creative partner Masha Vasyukova, "Sometimes it's all about combining things that might not make any sense, [like] subconsciousness and dreams. Dice is such a graphic and surrealistic object so it came into play." The video ends with Rihanna walking away slowly into a dark background.

Natalie Weiner of Billboard thought that the video for the song was one of the 11 best videos ever done by Rihanna and described it as a "fitting flex" for the singer and represents that the sexiness she presented in the visual for her 2013 single, "Pour It Up" "was just the beginning of her pulse-quickening powers." Laura Bradley of Slate magazine described the video as a departure for the both videos for "Work" with regards to her decision to star alone and shot the video only in black-and-white, reasons which ultimately gave the video a different vibe according to her. Maeve McDermott of USA Today described the video as "somewhat" NSFW regarding the language and the partial nudity and concluded by asking, "but would you expect anything less from a Rihanna video?" Vogue's Mackenzie Wagoner wrote, " In every instance, however free her nipple, she manages to look empowered, not vulgar—speaking to an obvious body confidence that, especially in the spotlight, can be hard-won." Further, she stated that Rihanna "evolved rule-breaking" and wrote that she is not a "factory-bred" sex symbol, but a woman who is fully comfortable with her body image.

== Live performances and covers ==
Rihanna was scheduled to perform "Kiss It Better" at the 58th Annual Grammy Awards, however her performance was cancelled last minute per her doctor's order to go on a "vocal rest". The performance was supposed to feature a 1980s talk-show theme where the singer was to be joined by television host James Corden. Rihanna performed "Kiss It Better" at the Anti World Tour as the closing song of each show.

American singer Miguel covered the song during his performance at the Spotify House, part of SXSW concerts. Indie rock singer Father John Misty covered "Kiss It Better" during his 2016 tour in support of his studio album, I Love You, Honeybear. According to Jon Blistein he delivered a "faithful, rousing rendition of the track while grinding and dancing around the stage".

At her halftime performance for the Super Bowl LVII, Rihanna did not actually perform "Kiss It Better", but interpolated a snippet of its refrain into "Rude Boy".

== Track listing ==
Dance Remix EP
No.	Title	Length
1.	"Kiss It Better" (R3hab Remix)	3:04
2.	"Kiss It Better" (Four Tet Remix)	4:56
3.	"Kiss It Better" (Kaytranada Edition)	5:25
4.	"Kiss It Better" (Feenixpawl Remix)	3:53

== Credits and personnel ==
Credits adapted from Rihanna's official website.

Locations

- Recorded at Jungle City Studios in New York City
- Mixed at Larrabee Studios in Universal City, California
- Mastering at Sterling Sound Studios in New York City, New York

Personnel

- Rihanna – vocals, writing
- Jeff Bhasker – writing, production
- Glass John – writing, additional production
- Teddy Sinclair – writing
- Nuno Bettencourt – guitar
- Marcos Tovar – vocal recording
- Kuk Harrell – vocal recording, vocal production
- Blake Mares – additional recording
- Brendan Morawski – recording assistant
- Manny Marroquin – mixing
- Chris Galland – mixing assistant
- Ike Schultz – mixing assistant
- Chris Gehringer – mastering

== Charts ==
=== Weekly charts ===
Weekly chart performance
Chart (2016)	Peak position
Australia (ARIA)	48
Belgium (Ultratip Bubbling Under Flanders)	15
Belgium (Ultratop Flanders Urban)	1
Belgium (Ultratip Bubbling Under Wallonia)	32
Canada Hot 100 (Billboard)	54
Finland Airplay (Radiosoittolista)	77
France (SNEP)	76
Ireland (IRMA)	66
Netherlands (Dutch Top 40 Tipparade)	6
New Zealand Heatseekers (RMNZ)	3
Scottish Singles Sales (Official Charts)	37
South Africa (EMA)	4
Sweden Heatseeker (Sverigetopplistan)	4
UK Singles (Official Charts)	46
UK Hip Hop/R&B (Official Charts)	8
US Billboard Hot 100	62
US Dance Club Songs (Billboard)	1
US Hot R&B/Hip-Hop Songs (Billboard)	21
US Pop Airplay (Billboard)	24
US Rhythmic Airplay (Billboard)	39

Chart (2026)	Peak position
Global 200 (Billboard)	90
Greece International (IFPI)	46
Philippines (Philippines Hot 100)	21

=== Year-end charts ===
2016 year-end chart performance
Chart (2016)	Position
Belgium (Ultratop Flanders Urban)	96
US Dance Club Songs (Billboard)	27
US Hot R&B/Hip-Hop Songs (Billboard)	73
US R&B Songs (Billboard)	23

== Certifications ==
Certifications
Region	Certification	Certified units/sales
Australia (ARIA)	3× Platinum	210,000^{‡}
Brazil (Pro-Música Brasil)	2× Platinum	120,000^{‡}
Canada (Music Canada)	2× Platinum	160,000^{‡}
Denmark (IFPI Danmark)	Platinum	90,000^{‡}
France (SNEP)	Platinum	200,000^{‡}
New Zealand (RMNZ)	4× Platinum	120,000^{‡}
Poland (ZPAV)	Gold	25,000^{‡}
United Kingdom (BPI)	Platinum	600,000^{‡}
United States (RIAA)	4× Platinum	4,000,000^{‡}
Streaming
Greece (IFPI Greece)	Platinum	2,000,000^{†}
Summaries
Worldwide	—	5,500,000
^{‡} Sales+streaming figures based on certification alone.^{†} Streaming-only figures based on certification alone.

== Release history ==
Release dates
Region	Date	Format	Label	Ref.
United States	March 30, 2016	Contemporary hit radio	Roc Nation; Westbury Road	
Italy	May 20, 2016	Contemporary hit radio	Roc Nation; Westbury Road	
United States	June 1, 2016	Streaming (remixes)	Roc Nation; Westbury Road	

== See also ==
- List of number-one dance singles of 2016 (U.S.)
