= Saturday Night (Natalia Kills song) =

Natalia Kills single

Single by Natalia Kills

from the album Trouble
- Released: 28 June 2013
- Genre: Synth-pop, New Wave
- Length: 4:46 (Single edit); 4:45 (Album version)
- Label: Interscope
- Songwriters: Natalia Kills; Jeff Bhasker
- Producer: Jeff Bhasker

Natalia Kills singles chronology
"Problem" (2013)	"Saturday Night" (2013)	"Trouble" (2014)

"Saturday Night" is a song by English singer and songwriter Natalia Kills from her second studio album Trouble (2013). It was released as the album's second single on 28 June 2013, following the release of the promotional single "Controversy" and the album's lead single "Problem". Written by Kills along with American record producer Jeff Bhasker, the song faces the themes of "squandered youth and disenchantment", and talks about moving on while going through a difficult time. Musically, it is a new wave-tinged, synth-based song.

Upon its release, "Saturday Night" was met with widespread critical acclaim; contemporary music critics highlighted the lyrics' personal content and billed it as Kills' best song to date. "Saturday Night" was able to peak at number twenty-three at the singles chart of New Zealand, and reached the top 10 of the US Billboard Hot Dance Club Songs. Along with the single release, a music video directed by Guillaume Doubet was released in July 2013. It revolves around domestic abuse, drug addiction, and Kills' relationship with her parents.

== Background ==
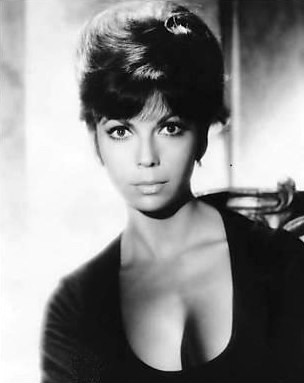
The guitar twangs in "Saturday Night" are reminiscent of those present in Nancy Sinatra (pictured) songs.

Kills revealed to Elle that the songwriting process for "Saturday Night" was difficult, as she had to confront memories and feelings. She further explained that, to her, it felt like a "confession". This song was deemed by Kills as her life's soundtrack: "When I was almost 14, I left home, got a job, and thought I was going to be a big TV star. I was determined to prove myself. I kept telling myself, 'I'm going to be fine,' even when I wasn't—especially when I didn't even believe it. The song is about carrying on, even though you feel like you can't. It's about feeling OK when everything is not." She later reiterated those sentiments with website Digital Spy, and stated that it would show people what she truly was and what she had gone through over the years.

== Composition ==
At a length of 4 minutes and 46 seconds (4:46), "Saturday Night" is a mid tempo synth-driven song, styled in the genres of pop and new wave, and is backed up by a "propulsive" synth line. Its instrumentation incorporates guitar twangs which resemble those heard in Nancy Sinatra's catalog; keyboards and a drumbeat. The autobiographical lyrics depict growing up in a home where domestic violence occurs, while also discussing "poignancy and lived experience". The song's "arena-ready, fists-aloft" chorus sees Kills singing "'Cause it's just another Saturday night", with repetitive "whoas".

Critics have likened it to the works of the band Fun (whom collaborated with Bhasker on their Grammy-nominated album, Some Nights), the electronic music duo The Knife, and the Canadian band Austra. Some have compared Kills' vocal performance (and respective production) to that of American recording artist Lana Del Rey. Allison from MuchMusic noted a contrast between its "serious subject matter" with an "uptempo, 80s synth beat", which according to the editor, creates a "visceral listening experience". Bradley Stern from MuuMuse wrote that the song's production was reminiscent of typical Ryan Tedder-produced songs.

== Release ==
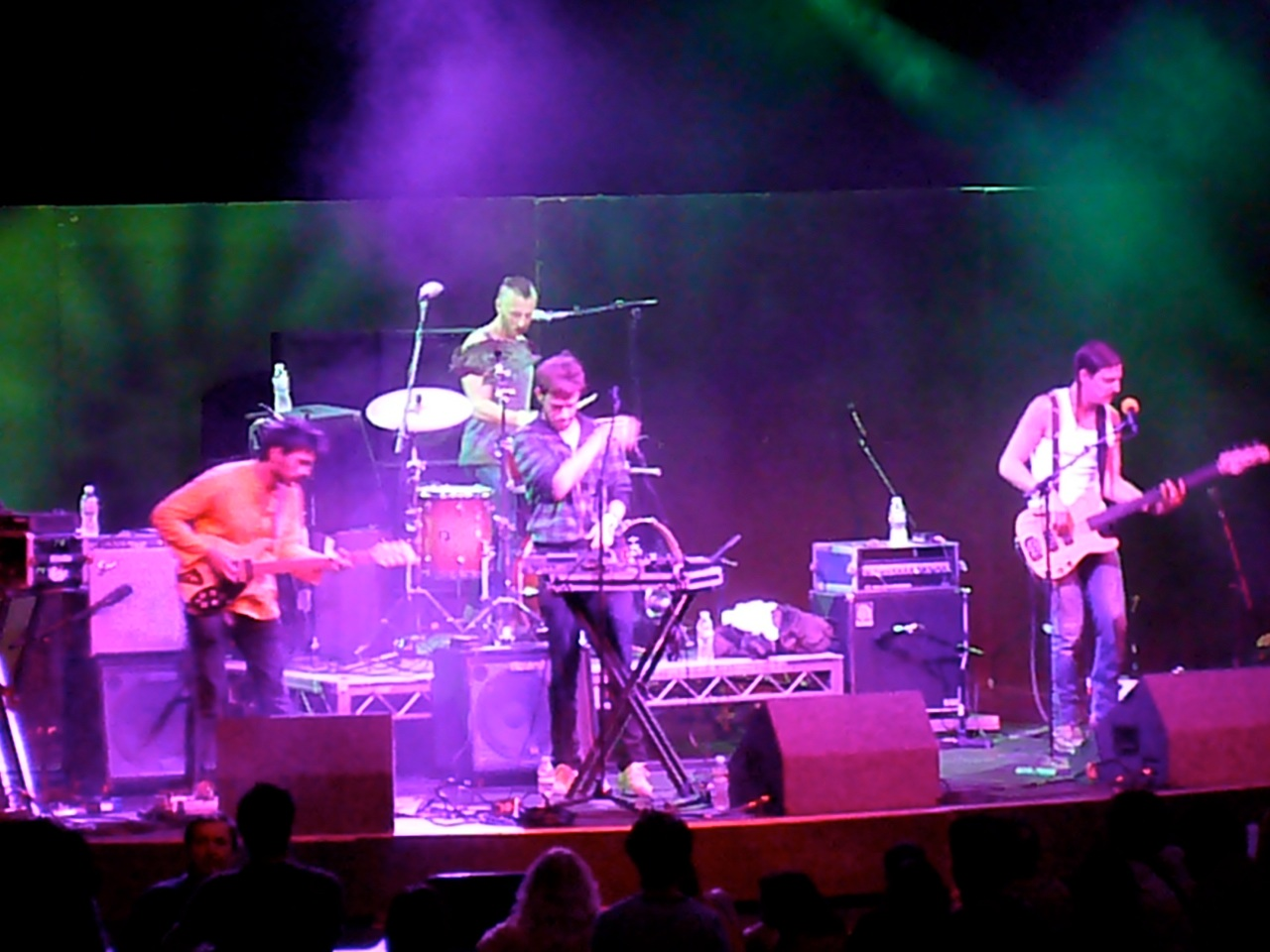
American psychedelic pop band Yeasayer (pictured) produced a remix of "Saturday Night".

"Saturday Night" was released on 28 June 2013 as Trouble's official second single: clean and explicit versions were released simultaneously before they were placed under its album's page. It was also serviced to Swedish pop radio stations. More than four months later, a remix EP for the song was released, containing two already known remixes by Gregori Klosman and Lovelife and two new remixes by Samantha Ronson vs. DK, and by Yeasayer. Another remix was produced by Betablock3r and released, but not included in the extended play.

== Reception ==
The song received universal acclaim from critics upon release, with many deeming it as her strongest single to date. Sam Lansky from Idolator praised the song's lyrics and classified it as the best of the singer's career. Jacques from Arcadey also praised the lyrics and described the song as "tight and radio-friendly". Matt Collar from Allmusic felt "Saturday Night" was one of the album's standout tracks. On the week of 16 September 2013, "Saturday Night" entered at number 34 on the New Zealand Singles Chart, and peaked at number 23. On the week of 14 October 2013, "Saturday Night" dropped to number 30. It reentered at number 33 on the week of 11 November 2013.

The song entered the US Billboard Hot Dance Club Songs at number 42, moving to numbers 37 and 24 in the following week, and ultimately peaking at 6. In Sweden, the top 10 of downloads listed "Saturday Night" at number 7, having the same position at the top 10 of streams. The song has proven to be popular on Internet blogs and media outlets, peaking at the top of the popular chart at The Hype Machine.

== Music video ==
A music video for "Saturday Night", directed by Guillaume Doubet, was shot in May 2013, and was released onto Kills' Vevo official account on 10 July 2013. Additional behind-the-scenes footage for the music video was released on 31 July 2013 onto YouTube.

It primarily depicts the "troubled" relationship between the singer and her parents. The singer revealed to Life+Times how she translated the message of the song into a music video: "I wanted to make a song and a video that showed how fucked up youth can be; having no control, money or guidance." Furthermore, she deemed the video "literal", confirming that the actors look "just like [her] real family" and that the set designer built the set from photos of the house she grew up in. During an interview with Playboy, Kills described the shooting of the video as "exciting" and revealed that she sent out pictures of what her real parents looked like and chose the actors that would play them in the video.

The video starts with her fictional mother applying blush over a bruised eye. As the music video continues, Kills repeatedly reenters the set with her parents as their relationship starts to "spiral". The video ends with a Christmas home movie of Kills' family. Various suggestions of domestic abuse, illegal business, problems with the law and drug addiction are presented throughout the video. Bradley Stern from MuuMuse thought the music video was a metaphor for Kills' personal life, commenting: "As much as she escapes the room, she always winds up walking back inside. She never really can escape her past."

== Track listing ==
- Digital download
1. "Saturday Night" – 4:46
- Digital download – Remixes EP
1. "Saturday Night" (Yeasayer) – 4:16
2. "Saturday Night" (Samantha Ronson vs. DK Remix) – 3:58
3. "Saturday Night" (Gregori Klosman) – 4:51
4. "Saturday Night" (Lovelife Remix) – 4:29

== Credits and personnel ==
Recording places

- Recorded at Enormous Studios and Record Plant.

Personnel

- Songwriting – Natalia Kills, Jeff Bhasker
- Producing – Jeff Bhasker
- Guitar – Jeff Bhasker, Jimmy Messer, Pawel Sek
- Keyboard – Jeff Bhasker
- Programming – Jeff Bhasker
- Engineering – Jeff Bhasker, Jimmy Messer, Pawel Sek
- Mixing – Tony Maserati

Credits adapted from the liner notes of Trouble, Interscope Records.

== Charts ==
Chart (2013/2014)	Peak position
New Zealand (Recorded Music NZ)	23
US Dance Club Songs (Billboard)	6

== Certifications ==
Region	Certification	Certified units/sales
New Zealand (RMNZ)	Gold	7,500^{*}
^{*} Sales figures based on certification alone.

== Release history ==
Region	Date	Format(s)	Label
South Africa	28 June 2013	Digital download	Interscope Records
Portugal	28 June 2013	Digital download	Interscope Records
Brazil	28 June 2013	Digital download	Interscope Records
Italy	28 June 2013	Digital download	Interscope Records
Finland	28 June 2013	Digital download	Interscope Records
New Zealand	28 June 2013	Digital download	Interscope Records
Netherlands	28 June 2013	Digital download	Interscope Records
Czech Republic	28 June 2013	Digital download	Interscope Records
Slovenia	28 June 2013	Digital download	Interscope Records
Switzerland	28 June 2013	Digital download	Interscope Records
Germany	1 July 2013	Digital download	Interscope Records
Austria	1 July 2013	Digital download	Interscope Records
Canada	2 July 2013	Digital download	Interscope Records
United States	2 July 2013	Digital download	Interscope Records
Mexico	2 July 2013	Digital download	Interscope Records
Japan	3 July 2013	Digital download	Interscope Records
Australia	5 July 2013	Digital download	Interscope Records
