= Tatana Sterba =

Tatana
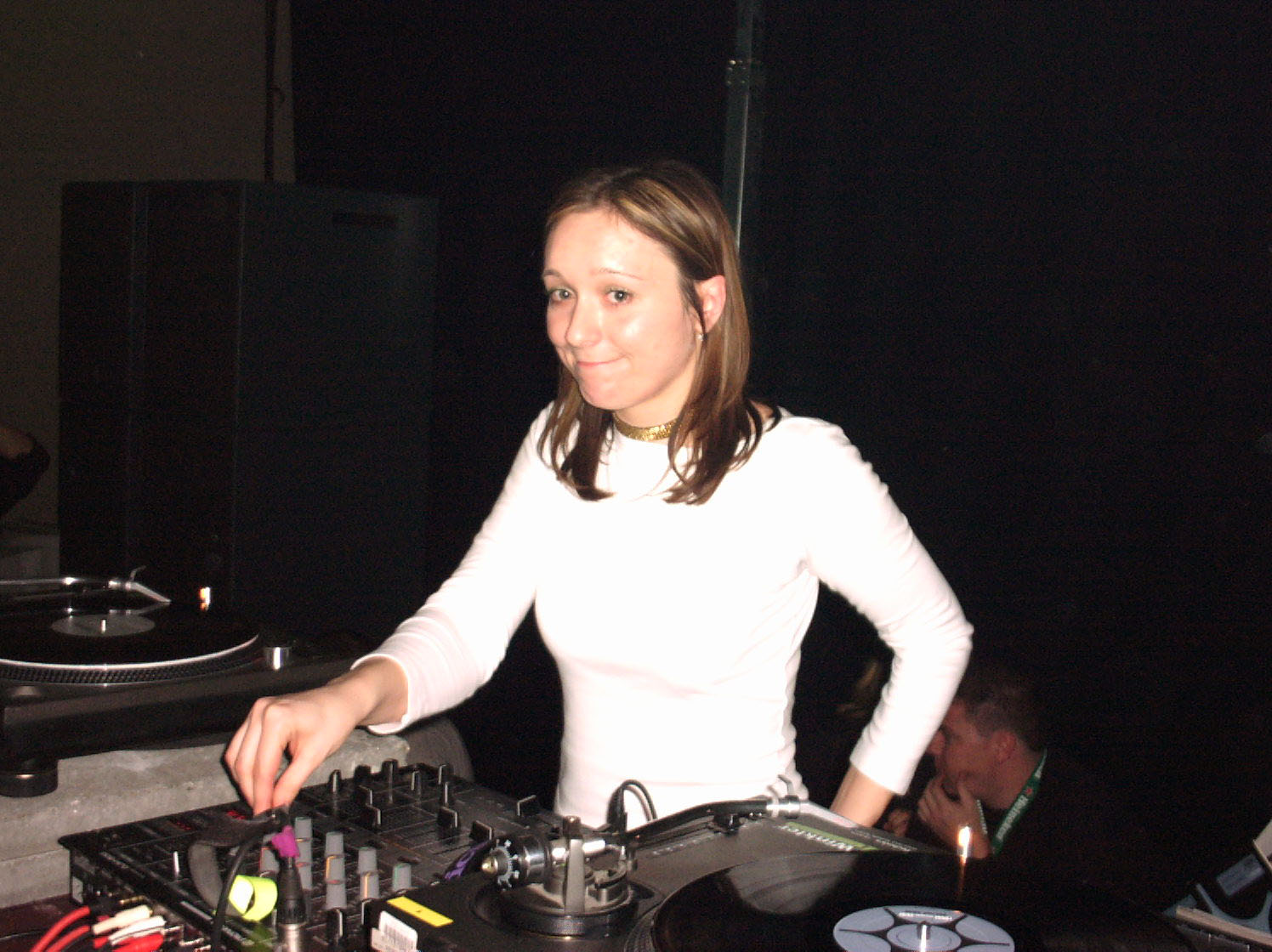
- Tatana at the Silence on March 3rd 2002

Background information
- Also known as: Tatana, Dj Tatana
- Born: Tatana Sterbova; 7 October 1976 (age 49)
- Origin: Uherské Hradiště, Czechoslovakia
- Genres: Progressive trance, uplifting trance, chillout, progressive house, EDM
- Instruments: Sampler, keyboards, guitar, percussion
- Years active: 1999–present

Tatana Sterba (born October 7, 1976, in Uherské Hradiště, Czechoslovakia (now in the Czech Republic) as Taťána Štěrbová (pronounced [ˈtacaːna ˈʃcɛrbovaː]), in 1980 the family emigrated to Switzerland) is a dance and trance producer better known under her alias Tatana.

== Career ==
Tatana is one of the most successful artists of the 2000s in the Swiss charts, with several successful trance albums since her debut album 24 Carat was released in February 2000.

Tatana's Swiss chart debut came in May 1999, with the release of the single "End Of Time", a collaboration with DJ Energy. The single was not a chart success, but put her on the map in the Swiss trance genre. The No. 14 single "More Than Words – Street Parade Hymn '99" followed, along with "Dream Off" and then her early 2000 debut album. Her debut album made No. 9 in the charts, but despite its success, no further singles followed from the album.

Tatana returned in November 2000 with her album Pure Elements, but again, no singles followed. Tatana had appeared to have abandoned releasing singles by this point, and released a third album, entitled Pink Punk, in May 2001. The album peaked at No. 5 and was at the time her biggest success to date.

DJ Energy collaborated again with Sterba in July 2001, releasing the single "Feel (Energy 2001 Anthem)". The single peaked at No. 83 but spent 5 weeks in the Top 100, and became a club success. Tatana went quiet for a while after that, before releasing the single "Words" in March 2002. The single was a huge success, making No. 5 in the Swiss charts, which to this day makes it her highest-placing single.

The album Superpop followed, making No. 2 on the Swiss album chart. A year without a new single or album followed, with the single "Moments" and album Wildlife released in March and April 2003 respectively. Wildlife would become her first album to chart #1.

Tatana appeared to be reducing the release of new material, with rumours of retirement even circulating. She returned in May 2004, and the album Neon Lights would be her second successive No.1 album. Her May 3, 2004, single release "Always On My Mind", a collaboration with Jaël, would become her second top ten single and peak at #6.

The top twenty singles "Elements Of Culture – Street Parade Hymn 2004" and "All That I Feel" (the latter featuring Pee) would follow, before her April 2005 album Peace And Love was released. The album would complete a hat-trick of chart #1s, a feat never achieved by any trance producer in Swiss chart history.

Her third top ten single "Today Is Tomorrow – Street Parade 2005", featuring the vocal talents of Morris, would follow in July 2005. "If I Could" followed in November 2005, and on December 3, 2005, Tatana released her Greatest Hits album. The album reached a peak of No.13 on the singles chart.

Her 2008 single "Spring Breeze" was included in Armin van Buuren's A State of Trance 2008 Yearmix.

In 2011, Tatana collaborated with British singer-songwriter Natalia Kills for the single "You Can't Get in My Head (If You Can't Get in My Bed)," featured on a new album called Heart.
