= Cruel Youth =

Band

- Genres: Alternative rock; electropop; dream pop
- Years active: 2016–present
- Label: Disgrace
- Members: Teddy Sinclair; Willy Moon; Lauren Stockner; Tina Hanäé
- Website: cruelyouthforever.com

Cruel Youth is a band fronted by Teddy Sinclair, who previously recorded two solo albums under the name Natalia Kills. In 2016, Sinclair started the band with her husband, Willy Moon. The band's first extended play (EP), +30mg, was released on September 16, 2016.

== Career ==
=== 2015–present: Formation and +30mg. ===
Following their removal from the New Zealand version of The X Factor in 2015, Sinclair and Moon relocated to the United States. During that year they began to experiment with music, ultimately forming the band Cruel Youth. Their first release was "Mr. Watson", which was uploaded to the band's SoundCloud in February 2016. The first official single from the band, "Diamond Days" produced by Paro, was released on April 15, 2016. Paro also helped Sinclair and Moon write "I Don't Love You", a track from Cruel Youth's debut extended play (EP) +30mg. "Mr. Watson" was released as a single on May 20 and a video was released the following month. Following the video, Sinclair announced the band would be releasing an EP later that year. On September 7, the band released the single "Hatefuck" and announced the EP would be released on September 16. Fashion designer Tom Ford used the song "Diamond Days" in a 2016 runway show. The music video premiered on September 28, 2016. Prior to the release of the EP, Sinclair announced via her Twitter account that the name for the EP would be Cowboys and Angels, but it was subsequently changed to +30mg. In September 2016, Cruel Youth announced they would be joining Kiiara for a US tour beginning in Los Angeles, and finishing in New York City.

In 2018, Cruel Youth released the non-album singles "Devil in Paradise" and "Portrait of a Female".

In 2022, the band released the single "Mr. Badman" for the soundtrack of The Invitation.

In 2023, the band released the non-album single "Sunny", a cover of the same-titled song by Bobby Hebb.

On April 18, 2025, three songs was released for the soundtrack of Season 4 from Godfather Of Harlem: "Time To Say Goodbye", "Crown Don't Make You King", with Conway The Machine and "Victorious", with Scarlip. On the same day, Teddy revealed on social media that she had recently undergone brain surgery to treat trigeminal neuralgia, a condition that causes severe facial pain.

== Discography ==
=== Extended plays ===
| Title | Details |
|---|---|
| +30mg | Released: 16 September 2016; Label: Disgrace; Formats: Digital download |

=== Singles ===
==== As lead artist ====
| Title | Year | Album |
|---|---|---|
| "Diamond Days" | 2016 | +30mg |
| "Mr. Watson" | 2016 | +30mg |
| "Hatefuck" | 2016 | +30mg |
| "Devil in Paradise" | 2018 | Non-album singles |
| "Portrait of a Female" | 2018 | Non-album singles |
| "Mr. Badman" | 2022 | Non-album singles |
| "Sunny" | 2023 | Non-album singles |

==== As featured artist ====
| Title | Album | Year |
|---|---|---|
| "Hush" (Holywater featuring Cruel Youth) | Non-album single | 2017 |
| "Part VII" (Prequell featuring Cruel Youth) | The Future Comes Before | 2017 |
| "Black River" (Godfather of Harlem featuring Cruel Youth) | Godfather of Harlem: Season 1 (Original Series Soundtrack) | 2019 |
| "No Bark When I Bite" (Godfather of Harlem featuring Cruel Youth & Rick Ross) | Godfather of Harlem: Season 2 (Original Series Soundtrack) | 2021 |
| "Too Long" (Nurko featuring Cruel Youth) | Discovery EP | 2023 |
| "Crown Don't Make You King" (Godfather of Harlem featuring Conway the Machine & Cruel Youth) | Godfather of Harlem: Season 4 (Original Series Soundtrack) | 2025 |
| "Time to Say Goodbye" (Godfather of Harlem featuring Cruel Youth) | Godfather of Harlem: Season 4 (Original Series Soundtrack) | 2025 |
| "Victorious" (Godfather of Harlem featuring Cruel Youth & Scarlip) | Godfather of Harlem: Season 4 (Original Series Soundtrack) | 2025 |

As The Powder Room
(Side B from Cruel Youth)

| Title | Album | Year |
|---|---|---|
| "I Want It Now" | Non-album singles | 2017 |
| "Birds" (featuring Izii) | Non-album singles | 2017 |
| "My Way" | Non-album singles | 2018 |
| "Till I See You Again" (featuring Unsecret) | Non-album singles | 2019 |
| "Isn't This a Lovely Day (To Be Caught in the Rain)?" | Irving Berling Reimagined: Top Hat | 2020 |
