= Free (Natalia Kills song) =

Single by Natalia Kills featuring will.i.am

from the album Perfectionist
- Released: 28 June 2011
- Recorded: 2010; American Dream, The Hive
- Genre: Dance-pop; synth-pop
- Length: 3:57 (original album version); 4:29 (single version)
- Label: will.i.am; Cherrytree; Kon Live; Interscope; Bozadya; Dandyville
- Songwriters: Natalia Kills; Jeff Bhasker; Scott Mescudi; Ernest Wilson; Kate Bush (uncredited)
- Producer: Jeff Bhasker

Natalia Kills singles chronology
"Champagne Showers" (2011)	"Free" (2011)	"Kill My Boyfriend" (2012)

will.i.am singles chronology
"Check It Out" (2010)	"Free" (2011)	"Forever" (2011)

Alternative cover
- UK EP cover

"Free" is a song by English recording artist Natalia Kills from her debut studio album, Perfectionist. Written by Kills, Jeff Bhasker, Kid Cudi and No I.D., produced by Bhasker. Lyrically, the song discusses materialism, consumerism, and obsessions with glamour and wealth. It was released digitally in Europe and the US as the album's third single in June 2011. The song was released as the second single in the UK on 11 September 2011.

== Background ==
For the single version, will.i.am provided an opening verse and bridge. The single version was the official version on the US release of the album, the UK track listing to be announced. "Free" was released as Kills' second single in the United Kingdom on 11 September 2011, as an iTunes EP featuring both versions with and without will.i.am including 2 remixes, and a new magazine-style artwork. Polydor Records, who represent Kills in the UK, decided against releasing Wonderland as a single in the UK and have instead chosen to promote the album Perfectionist by releasing "Free" a week before the album's release. "Free" is based around a sample taken from the chorus of Kate Bush's "Wuthering Heights".

== Composition ==
Produced by Jeff Bhasker and co-penned by Kills, Kid Cudi and No I.D., described the song as one of the most fun, breezy songs off of Kills' debut album. "Free" is a dance-pop and synth-pop song with urban club beats with a Euro-friendly synths and impressive guest feature by Will.i.am, Digital Spy added saying: "it certainly ticks many a box on the modern pop song checklist. " Muumuse said the song contains the objectively perfect pop line: "I can look fresh in a potato sack".

== Chart performance ==
"Free" performed better than Kills previous single "Wonderland". In Austria the song reached a peak at number 4, becoming Kills highest-charting single there, it remained it the charts for 17 weeks. The song peaked at number 96 in The Netherlands, and stayed in the charts for 2 weeks. In Germany the song reached number 15 on the charts.

== Music video ==
The music video for the song was released on YouTube on 6 July 2011. The music video starts with a date, 15 August 2011 (Natalia's birthday) and the word "REC", after it, the song title, "Free". Natalia appears above a television, that transmits an image of will.i.am, while a camera is filming her. The words and phrases "You Can Buy Happiness", "Free", "Perfectionist", "Money Is Everything", "Buy Your Freedom", "You Are What You Wear", "You Are Free", appear throughout the video. A woman appears smoking, a man putting lipstick (AJ English- Model), a naked person removing ripping their clothes with a heel, Kills above motocycles and her in a box filled with dollars. Some montages show Kills with a muscular body, a woman with long neck, and with her hair on fire. Kills is also seen surrounded by a woman wearing a suit, with her breasts exposed, the lipstick man, and a couple other people. Another man with long hair, wearing a hat and veil, strips off his clothes. In the last scene of the video, the box is completely filled with dollars, and just after the last word of the song, i.e. "I'm" is sung, we only see Kills' hand with the word "free" written on it.

=== Alternate version ===
On 6 September 2011, Kills reported that a new "Free" video was coming soon. The news was also posted alongside a photo, which was presumed to be a still from the new video. On 12 September 2011, the alternate video premiered on Vevo and was made available to buy on iTunes. This version does not feature will.i.am. It was also announced that a 3D version this video will be played in stores worldwide which display the Panasonic VIERA 3D TVs. Kills premiered the 3D video at the IFA Premiership 2011 in Berlin at a Panasonic booth on 2 September. The video opens with Kills getting out of a car. A ripped effect changes the scene to a bedroom. She is later seen surrounded by people putting on her make-up in a rush. The scene then cuts to Kills surrounded by paparazzi. There is also a scene where she is in an alley with falling confetti. The final scene is of Kills in another room with a man applying make-up to her face, another man spraying her hair with hairspray, two body builders in the background and other various people all in a frozen position. After 2 minutes and 40 seconds, the video is cut after the line, "If the bank man calls, just tell him I'm-". Most of the video is in black and white. An extended version of this video is played solely on Panasonic 3D televisions. It features the Panasonic 3D TV set.

== Track listing ==
- Digital download
1. "Free" featuring will.i.am – 4:29
- UK Digital EP
1. "Free" featuring will.i.am – 4.29
2. "Free" – 3.57
3. "Free" featuring will.i.am (Moto Blanco Club Mix) – 7:34
4. "Free" featuring will.i.am (The Bimbo Jones Radio Edit) – 3:50
- France Digital EP
1. "Free" feat. will.i.am (Guena LG Radio Mix) – 3:35
2. "Free" feat. will.i.am (Guena LG Club Mix) – 6:29
- CD single
1. "Free" feat. will.i.am (Radio Edit) – 4:15
2. "Free" feat. will.i.am (The Bimbo Jones Radio Edit) – 3:52

== Charts ==
Chart (2011)	Peak position
Austria (Ö3 Austria Top 40)	4
Belgium (Ultratip Bubbling Under Flanders)	20
Belgium (Ultratip Bubbling Under Wallonia)	13
Germany (GfK)	15
Netherlands (Mega Single Top 100)	96
Slovakia Airplay (ČNS IFPI)	11
UK Singles Chart	118

=== Year-end charts ===
Chart (2011)	Position
German Singles Chart	89
Austrian Singles Chart	63

== Certifications ==
Region	Certification	Certified units/sales
Germany (BVMI)	Gold	150,000^{‡}
^{‡} Sales+streaming figures based on certification alone.

== Release history ==
Country	Release date	Format
United Kingdom	11 September 2011	Digital download
France	11 September 2011	Digital download
Germany	26 June 2011	Digital download
United States	28 June 2011	Digital download
United Kingdom	11 September 2011	Digital EP
