= They Talk Shit About Me =

"They Talk Sh#t About Me"

Single by M. Pokora featuring Verse

from the album MP3
- B-side: "Forbidden Drive"
- Released: 9 June 2008
- Genre: R&B; hip hop; dance-pop
- Length: 3:29
- Label: Capitol
- Songwriter(s): M. Pokora; Natalia Cappuccini; Pete Martin
- Producer(s): Pete Martin; Jordan Houyez

M. Pokora singles chronology
"Dangerous" (2006)	"They Talk Sh#t About Me" (2008)	"Catch Me If You Can" (2008)

Verse singles chronology
"Don't Play Nice" (2005)	"They Talk Sh#t About Me" (2008)	"Mirrors" (2010)

"They Talk Sh#t About Me" is a song by M. Pokora featuring British singer Verse, from this MP3 album. It was released in June 2008 in Europe.

== Track listings ==
CD single

1. "They Talk Sh#t About Me"
2. "Forbidden Drive"

Digital download

1. "They Talk Sh#t About Me"

== Charts ==
Chart (2008)	Peak position
Belgium (Ultratip Bubbling Under Wallonia)	3
France (SNEP)	24
