= Don't Play Nice =

2005 single by Verbalicious

Single by Verbalicious
- B-side: "Hey Boy"
- Released: 21 February 2005
- Studio: Random (Gothenburg, Sweden)
- Length: 2:48
- Label: Adventure; All Around the World
- Songwriters: Verbalicious; Mowgli; Hugo Lira; Thomas Gustafsson; Tobias Lindell
- Producers: Thomas Gustafsson; Hugo Lira; Tobias Lindell

Teddy Sinclair singles chronology
"Don't Play Nice" (2005)	"They Talk Shit About Me" (2009)

"Don't Play Nice" is a song by English singer-songwriter Teddy Sinclair, who released the song under the name Verbalicious. Serving as her debut single, the song was written by Sinclair, Mowgli, Hugo Lira, Thomas Gustafsson, and Tobias Lindell, with production helmed by the latter three. The song became a hit in the United Kingdom, reaching number 11 on the UK Singles Chart. It also charted in Ireland, where it peaked at number 48.

== Background ==
The single was released commercially only in Ireland, Italy, and the United Kingdom. It is Teddy Sinclair's only single released under the name Verbalicious. Though the song charted well, due to poor sales, no album materialised. The song was released on the dance label All Around the World. The single was nominated for the 2005 Popjustice £20 Music Prize, but it lost to "Wake Me Up" by Girls Aloud.

== Track listings ==
UK CD single

1. "Don't Play Nice" (original edit) – 2:50
2. "Don't Play Nice" (Random radio mix) – 2:48
3. "Don't Play Nice" (Mowgli club rub) – 4:43
4. "Hey Boy" – 2:50
5. "Don't Play Nice" (video)

Italian CD single

1. "Don't Play Nice" (original edit) – 2:50
2. "Don't Play Nice" (Random radio mix) – 2:48
3. "Don't Play Nice" (Mowgli club rub) – 4:43

Italian 12-inch single

A. "Don't Play Nice" (Mowgli club rub) – 4:43
B. "Don't Play Nice" (original edit) – 2:50

== Credits and personnel ==
Credits are taken from the Italian 12-inch single sleeve.

Studios

- Recorded at Random Studios (Gothenburg, Sweden)
- Mixed at the Mixroom (Gothenburg, Sweden)
- Remixed at Mowgli Music (London, England)

Personnel

- Teddy Sinclair – writing (as Verbalicious), remixing
- Mowgli – writing, extended remixing
- Hugo Lira – writing, production, recording
- Thomas Gustafsson – writing, production, recording
- Tobias Lindell – writing, production, mixing

== Charts ==
Chart (2005)	Peak position
Ireland (IRMA)	48
Romania (Romanian Top 100)	96
Scottish Singles Sales (Official Charts)	11
UK Singles (Official Charts)	11
UK Hip Hop/R&B (Official Charts)	9

== Release history ==
Region	Date	Format(s)	Label(s)	Ref.
United Kingdom	21 February 2005	CD	Adventure; All Around the World	
