= Mirrors (Natalia Kills song) =

Single by Natalia Kills

from the album Perfectionist
- Released: 10 August 2010
- Genre: Disco-pop
- Length: 3:16
- Label: will.i.am; Cherrytree; KonLive; Interscope
- Songwriters: Natalia Kills; Martin Kierszenbaum; Akon; Giorgio Tuinfort
- Producers: Akon; Giorgio Tuinfort; Martin "Cherry Cherry Boom Boom" Kierszenbaum

Natalia Kills singles chronology
"They Talk Shit About Me" (2008)	"Mirrors" (2010)	"Wonderland" (2011)

Music video
- "Mirrors" on YouTube

"Mirrors" is a song by English singer Natalia Kills from her debut studio album, Perfectionist (2011). It was released by Cherrytree Records on 10 August 2010 as the lead single from the album. The track was written and produced by Akon, Giorgio Tuinfort and Martin "Cherry Cherry Boom Boom" Kierszenbaum, with additional writing from Kills. Described as a disco-pop song, "Mirrors" contains references to various themes including sexual sadomasochism and arrogance.

Critical response to "Mirrors" was generally positive—most music critics denoted it as a standout from Perfectionist. The track received chart success in some countries of Europe, reaching the top ten of Austria, Germany, and Poland. On the US Hot Dance Club Songs, it peaked at number three, whereas in the United Kingdom, it failed to reach the top 100. The music video for "Mirrors" was directed by Guillaume Doubet, and follows Kills exploring the concepts of vanity, control and sex after being mysteriously dragged into a mirror. She further promoted the song with live performances on the 2011 Life Ball and on the German programme Schlag den Raab.

== Background and composition ==
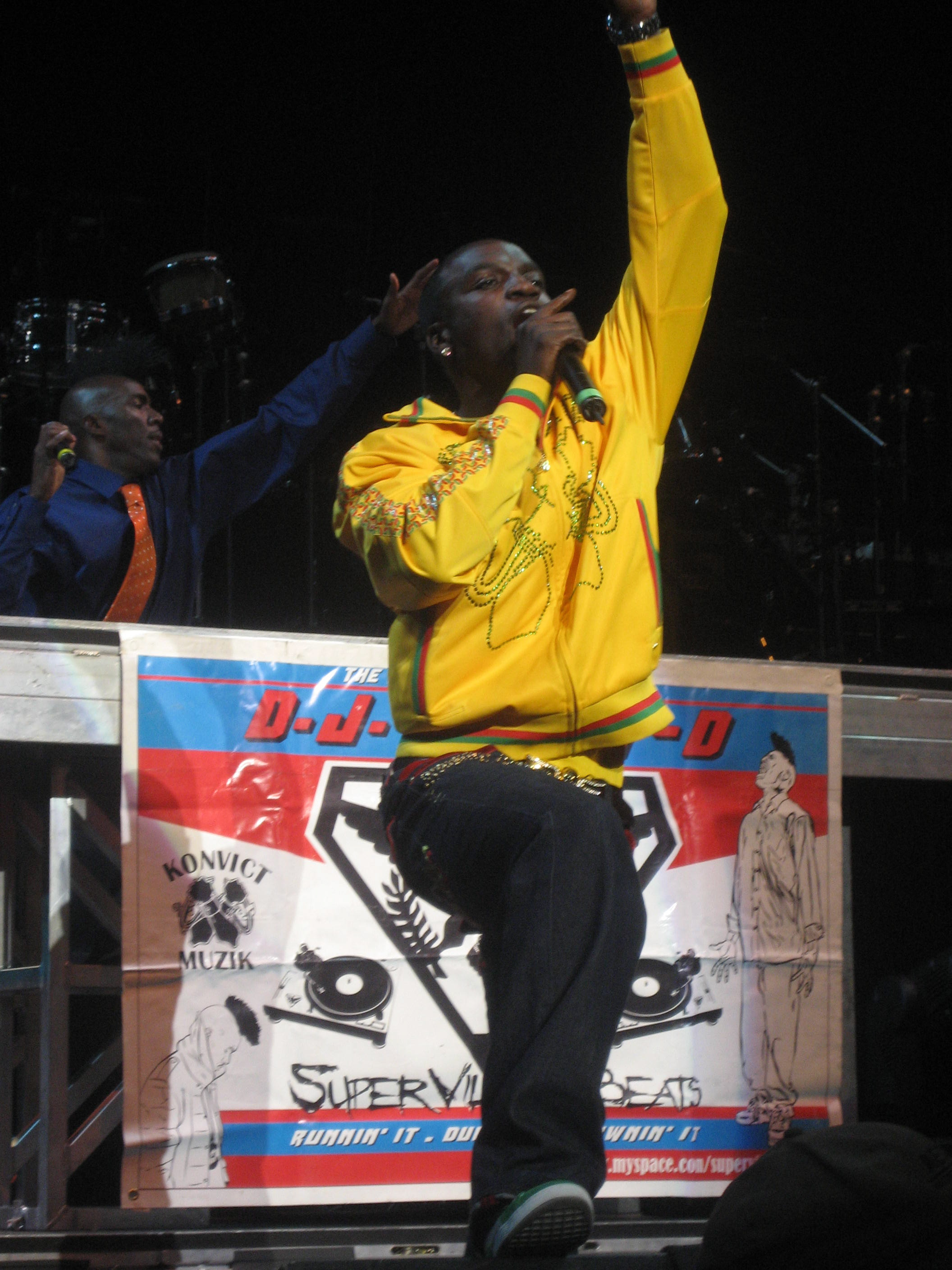
Akon served as a producer for the song

"Mirrors" was recorded at the 11th Street Studios, Chalice Recording Studios and Cherrytree Recording Studios. It was co-produced and co-written by Akon, Giorgio Tuinfort, and Martin "Cherry Cherry Boom Boom" Kierszenbaum; the latter two also recorded instruments for the song. Kills provided additional songwriting. Mark "Exit" Goodchild and Tony Ugyal engineered it, while post-production was helmed by Robert Orton and Gene Grimaldi. The former mixed the track, while the latter mastered it.

"Mirrors" has been described as a disco-pop song which features electric guitars, a bassline and a "grinding synthesised beat" and that the track "fuses bubbling '80s synth pop basslines, stadium rock guitars, and an anthemic falsetto chorus". Jack Stevin of AltSounds commented that the track's instrumentation provides it with a "gothic feel". AllMusic's Jon O'Brien and AOL Radio writer Matthew Wilkening likened the song to "Sweet Dreams (Are Made of This)" by Eurythmics—the former credited "Mirrors"' beat with the similarity, while the latter compared it to an "all fueled-up on Red Bull and steroids" version of the Eurythmics track. Kills hits a falsetto note on the chorus, where she sings, "Turning the lights out / Burning the candles / And the mirrors gonna fog tonight". The song's lyrics reference sadomasochist sexual practices, with Kills incorporating a dominatrix-inspired persona. Consequence of Sound's Alex Young interpreted the lyrical content as discussing "duplicity of identity, hubris, and objectification", which he also called "more relatable" than the themes portrayed in Perfectionist.

== Reception ==
Upon release, "Mirrors" received generally positive reviews from music critics. Writing for Consequence of Sound, Alex Young highlighted the song as an "essential track" from Perfectionist, while AllMusic's Jon O'Brien also denoted it as a standout from the album, calling it "pretty stellar". Lewis Corner of Digital Spy similarly praised the song, giving it a four out of five stars rating. Blair Kelly from musicOMH described the song's chorus as "great, and very catchy"; conversely, she criticized the song's talked part. AltSounds' Jack Stevin opined that the song was "enjoyable", in spite of "uninspiring lyrics".

The song achieved high positions on some European charts. On the Ö3 Austria Top 40, it spent 20 weeks and peaked at number 7; the track was listed fiftieth on Austria's 2011 year-end chart. "Mirrors" reached number 10 on the Media Control German single chart, and was 2011's 80th most successful single in the country. The song reached its highest peak of number two on the Polish Airplay Top 20, for the week ending 15 April 2011; in contrast, the song entered the United Kingdom chart at number 101. In Switzerland, "Mirrors" spent one week, peaking at number 52, whereas in Flanders, it didn't manage to enter the main Ultratop chart and instead entered the secondary Ultratip, at number 18. In North America, the single attained limited success—it reached number 35 on the Canadian Hot 100, and peaked at number 3 on the US Hot Dance Club Songs.

== Music video ==
The French director Guillaume Doubet was commissioned to direct the video for "Mirrors", which was released on 2 December 2010. Idolator's Robbie Daw described it as "creepy" and "cinematic", and praised Kills' clothing.

The video begins with Kills applying red lipstick, in a car mirror, while the instrumental of the song plays. She leaves the car and passes by a man, who is afterwards seen standing between two women wearing plastic masks of Kills' face. The music mutes and the sound of footsteps is heard repeatedly as Kills approaches a cracked mirror. After hearing a noise behind her, she looks over her shoulder as her reflection looks to her as well. Kills is dragged into the mirror, and the title card of the first act, "Vanity". During the section, a metal skull is shown while Kills lip-synchs the song in front of a mirror. The visual transitions to its second act, dubbed "Control", in which she holds an axe while standing on top of a glass box. A man is seen inside the box, filming her as she moves around it. The video then shifts to act three, named "Sex", in which Kill is depicted singing to a skull. Towards the end of the video, Kills is seen handcuffed and chained while sitting on the floor, and seducing a blindfolded man.

== Live performances ==
Kills first performed "Mirrors" at Prince Peter's fashion show during New York Fashion Week on 8 September 2010. On 25 April 2011, Kills performed the song at ProSieben's live game show Schlag den Raab. A month later, she performed it at the 2011 Life Ball, held in Austria.

== Track listings ==
- Digital download
1. "Mirrors" – 3:16
- German CD single
1. "Mirrors" – 3:16
2. "Mirrors" (Frankmusik Obsidian Overkill Remix) – 3:20
- German digital EP – Remix
1. "Mirrors" – 3:16
2. "Mirrors" (Frankmusik Obsidian Overkill Remix) – 3:20
3. "Mirrors" (Doctor Rosen Rosen Rx Remix) – 4:49
4. "Mirrors" (Sketch Iz Dead Dead Remix) – 4:15
5. "Mirrors" (Moto Blanco Radio) – 2:55
- US digital EP – Remix
1. "Mirrors" (Sketch Iz Dead Remix) – 4:15
2. "Mirrors" (Doctor Rosen Rosen Rx Remix) – 4:49
3. "Mirrors" (Moto Blanco Dub) – 7:10
4. "Mirrors" (Purple Crush Remix) – 4:06
- US digital EP – Remixes Chapter 2
1. "Mirrors" (Adrian Lux Remix) – 6:33
2. "Mirrors" (Frankmusik Obsidian Overkill Mix) – 3:20
3. "Mirrors" (Chris Moody Remix) – 6:39
4. "Mirrors" (Jeff T Club Remix) – 6:01
5. "Mirrors" (SkiDropz Remix) – 3:05
- US Promo EP - Mirrors / Wonderland
1. "Mirrors" (Albumn Version)
2. "Mirrors" (Chris Moody Remix)
3. "Mirrors" (Kevin Graves Club Remix)
4. "Mirrors" (Frankmusik Obsidian Overkill Mix)
5. "Mirrors" (Jeff T Club Remix)
6. "Mirrors" (Saul Ruiz Club Mix)
7. "Mirrors" (Adrian Lux Remix)
8. "Mirrors" (Sin Morera Fierce Remix)
9. "Mirrors" (FRG Deluxe Remix)

== Personnel ==
Credits adapted from the liner notes of Perfectionist.

- Natalia Kills – vocals
- Akon – production
- Mark "Exit" Goodchild – engineering
- Martin Kierszenbaum – all instruments, production
- Robert Orton – mixing
- Giorgio Tuinfort – all instruments, production
- Tony Ugyal – engineering

== Charts ==
=== Weekly charts ===
Chart (2011)	Peak position
Austria (Ö3 Austria Top 40)	7
Belgium (Ultratip Bubbling Under Flanders)	18
Canada Hot 100 (Billboard)	46
Germany (GfK)	10
Poland Airplay (ZPAV)	2
Switzerland (Schweizer Hitparade)	52
UK Singles (Official Charts Company)	101
US Dance Club Songs (Billboard)	3

=== Year-end charts ===
Chart (2011)	Position
Austria (Ö3 Austria Top 40)	50
Germany (Official German Charts)	80

== Certifications ==
Region	Certification	Certified units/sales
Germany (BVMI)	Gold	150,000^{‡}
^{‡} Sales+streaming figures based on certification alone.

== Release history ==
Region	Date	Format
United States	10 August 2010	Digital download
Germany	3 September 2010	Digital download
United Kingdom	3 September 2010	Digital download
United States	2 November 2010	Digital EP – Remix
Germany	10 January 2011	Digital EP – Remix
Germany	11 February 2011	CD single
United States	1 March 2011	Digital download – Live at the Cherrytree House
United States	26 April 2011	Digital EP – Remixes Chapter 2
