= Outta Time (Natalia Kills song) =

Promotional single by Natalia Kills

from the album Trouble
- Released: August 26, 2013
- Genre: Pop, Doo-wop
- Length: 3:42
- Label: Interscope
- Songwriters: Natalia Kills; Jeff Bhasker
- Producer: Bhasker

"Outta Time" is a song recorded by English singer-songwriter Natalia Kills for her second studio album, Trouble (2013). Musically, it is a retro pop soul-tinged song that recalls Phil Spector's catalog, complete with guitar riffs and supporting vocals while its lyrics tell a sad love story. It was unveiled on August 26, 2013 through a newsletter, and was later released on September 3, 2013 on iTunes as the album's second promotional single.

Upon the release of its parent album, "Outta Time" received generally positive reviews from contemporary music critics, who favored its overall sound and the singer's vocals. To promote it and the album, an official lyric video was released on September 3, 2013. The "lo-fi" video features Kills in front of a cloudy background, and in most scenes, holding balloons. She has also performed it live for Yahoo! Music.

== Background and release ==
"Outta Time" was released twice as the album's second promotional single, following "Controversy". It was first available online via a Polydor Records/Universal Music France promotional newsletter, put online on August 26, 2013, in which the song would be offered to the user should he provide his email address. Later, on September 3, 2013, it was put on the iTunes Store under its own page with new artwork, coinciding with the official release of Trouble.

== Composition ==
Musically, "Outta Time" is a retro Motown inspired love song, that is styled in the genre of pop soul, which is reminiscent of the catalog of American recording artist Phil Spector. It was also described as recalling 60s girl groups. The song contains prominent background vocals and forlorn guitar riffs. Kills' "raw" vocals in the song recall those of Dusty Springfield. Its lyrical content depicts a melancholic love story: "We've been driving down this road since I was seventeen / You could tear my heart like pages of a magazine / But now your photograph has faded and my bed is cold at night / And I wish that love could save us, but we're outta time." Sam Johnson from So So Gay noted that the song, much like other Trouble tracks, plays as if it was in a vinyl or a "scratched up" compact disc.

== Critical reception ==
Upon the release of Trouble, "Outta Time" received generally positive reviews from contemporary music critics, who praised its sound. Reviewing the album for So So Gay, Sam Johnson was very positive of the song, deeming it an "indication of Kills' musicality", and favoring Kills' vocals as opposed to what he thought of them in other album tracks. He also called it "refined and soulful", and "cleansing". He went on to pick it as one of the album's standouts. Sam Lansky from the website Idolator classified it as one of the "instantly likable moments" in the album, and a "perfectly solid throwback". Bradley Stern from MuuMuse singled out "Outta Time" and "Boys Don't Cry" as the album's "biggest surprises" for their "throwback soul" sound; opining that they put a "fresh spin on vintage sound" and likened their "big, pure pop" choruses to those present in The Ronettes' songs.

== Lyric video and live performance ==
Kills' label, Cherrytree, wanted her to do a lyric video. Kills agreed and later, the label sent her a rough version of the video, which Kills did not entirely approve as it didn't have the singer's image on it. She then came up with the idea of holding balloons in the video, which she revealed that could transmit either sentiments of sadness or happiness. She filmed the parts with her in one of her friends' studio, and explained her concept: "I said hey, let’s project the things from my music on to myself. It has this double meaning. Projection can also be when I’m projecting my feelings on you."

The final result was posted on September 4, 2013 on the website Idolator, following the single release on the iTunes Store, though an official release on Kills' VEVO/YouTube channel only took place on September 11, 2013. The video features Kills standing in front of a "cloudy" background, wearing different outfits, which Sam Lansky from Idolator thought was "fierce fashion", while she is also seen whipping her ponytail and smoking a cigar in other scenes.

To promote Trouble, Kills performed "Outta Time" for Yahoo! Music.

== Credits and personnel ==
Credits adapted from the liner notes of Trouble.

Personnel

- Songwriting – Natalia Kills and Jeff Bhasker
- Production – Jeff Bhasker
- Guitar – Jeff Bhasker
- Keyboards – Jeff Bhasker
- Programming – Jeff Bhasker
- Background vocals – Jeff Bhasker
- Engineering – Jeff Bhasker
- Mixing – Jeff Bhasker
- Mastering – Chris Athens

Recording places

- Recorded at Enormous Studios (Los Angeles, California)
- Mastered at Chris Athens Studios (Austin, Texas)
