= Paweł Sęk =

Polish record producer (born 1977)

Pawel Sek
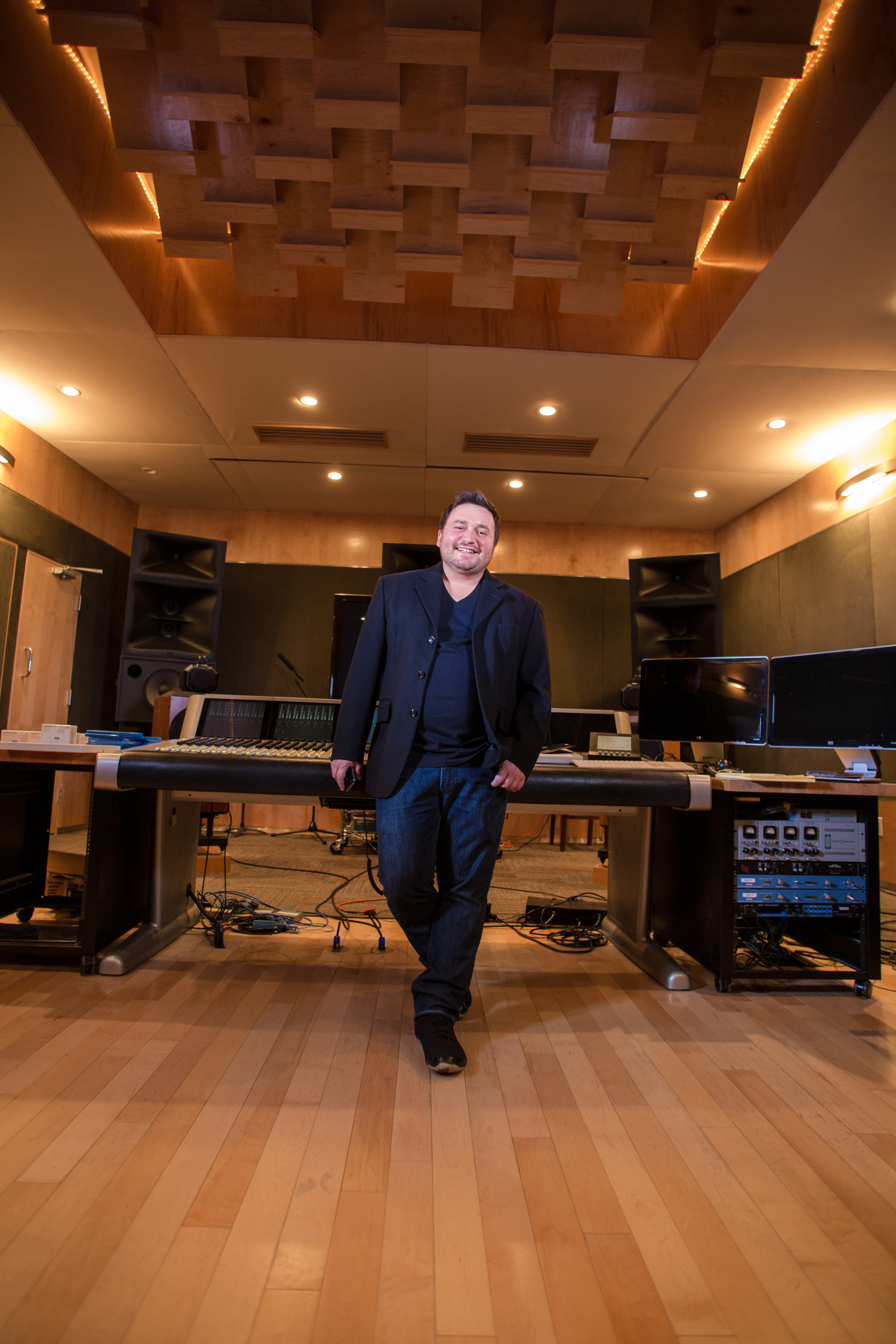

Background information
- Born: April 7, 1977 (age 49)
- Origin: Przemyśl, Poland
- Occupations: Record producer, audio engineer, composer
- Instruments: Drums, Piano, Guitar
- Website: www.pawelsek.com

Paweł Sęk (born 7 April 1977, Przemyśl) is a Polish producer, composer and audio engineer. He received three Grammy Award nominations. He grew up in Przemyśl, Poland. In 2000, Sek graduated from Berklee College of Music in Boston. After graduating, he moved to New York, where he started writing and producing music for television shows and advertising.

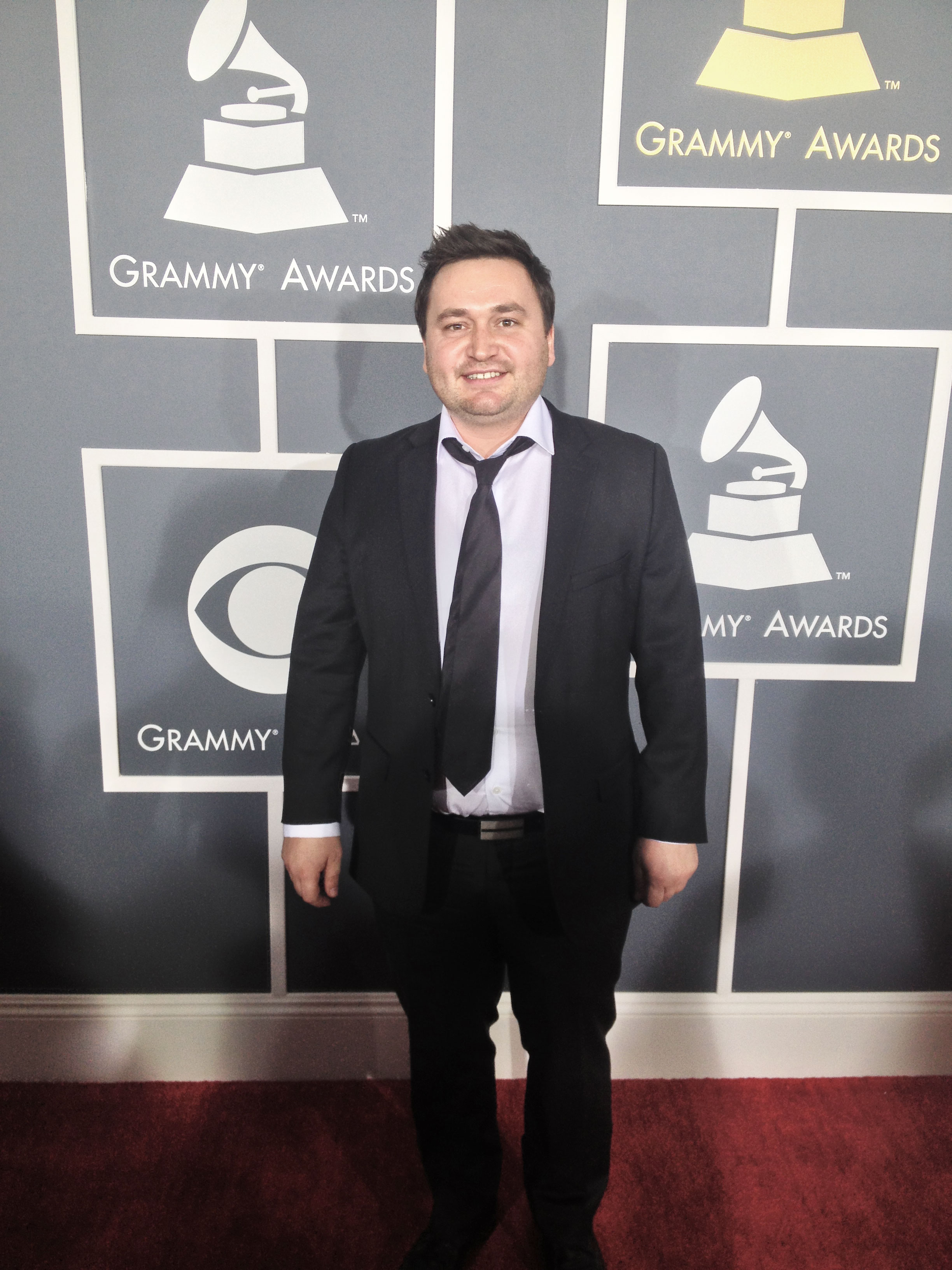
Pawel Sek at the Grammys

== Credits ==
His credits include, Carrier, Frontier House - PBS, Beowulf - Trailer, KFC National Campaign, GM National TV ad, Audi National TV ad. In 2009, he relocated to Los Angeles where he started to work with major label recording artists. His current engineering credits include: Jeff Bhasker, Taylor Swift, Lady Gaga, FUN., P!nk, Kanye West, Jay-Z, The Sleepy Jackson, Empire of the Sun.

Sek's film scoring credits include: The Way, Way Back (Score Mix), Deadline, The Ballerina and the Rocking Horse. In 2012, Pawel was nominated for two Grammys in the Album of the Year and Record of the Year categories with the group FUN.

=== Engineering ===
- FUN.
  - Some Nights
    - Some Nights (Intro)
    - Some Nights
    - We Are Young
    - Carry On
    - Why Am I the One
    - All Alone
    - Stars
- Taylor Swift
  - RED
    - Holy Ground
    - The Lucky One
- P!nk
  - The Truth About Love
    - Just Give Me a Reason (featuring Nate Ruess)
- Dido
  - Girl Who Got Away
    - Let Us Move On (featuring Kendrick Lamar)
- Jay-Z / Kanye West
  - Watch the Throne
    - Lift Off (featuring Beyoncé)

=== Film Scoring Credits ===
- The Ballerina and the Rocking Horse at IMDb, 2012
- The Way, Way Back at IMDb, (Music Score Mix), 2013
- Deadline at IMDb, 2011
- Carrier, 2008

=== Music Licensing Credits ===
- Beowulf - movie and video game trailer
- Daltry Calhoun - trailer
- Scrubs
- The Unusuals
- Pimp My Ride
- Making the Band
- America's Next Top Model
