= Teddy Sinclair =

English singer-songwriter (born 1986)

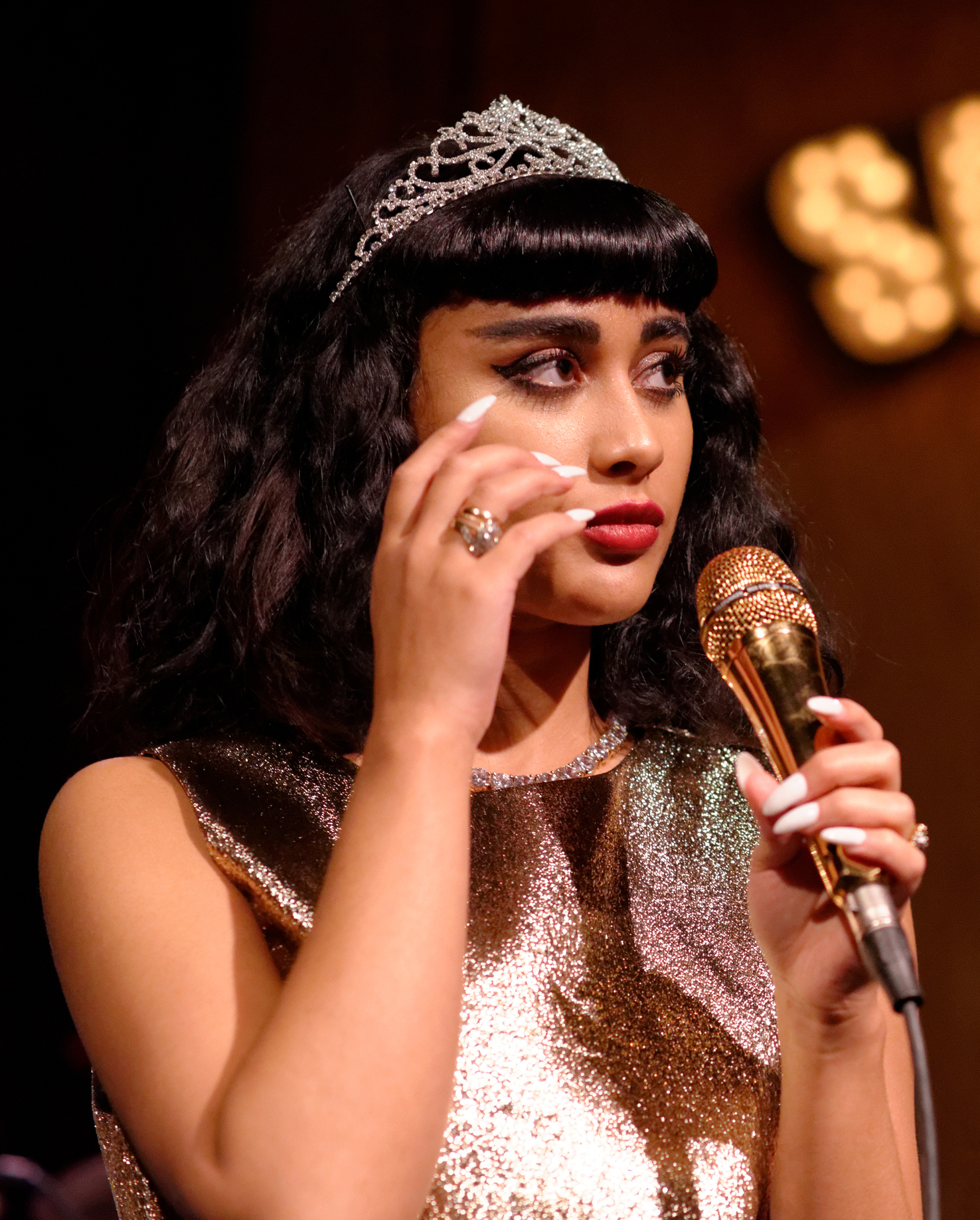
- Sinclair in 2014

Background information
- Born: Natalia Noemi Cappuccini; 15 August 1986 (age 40); Bradford, West Yorkshire, England
- Genres: Pop; dance-pop; electropop
- Occupations: Singer; songwriter; actress
- Years active: 1995–present
- Labels: Adventures in Music; will.i.am; Cherrytree; KonLive; Rough Trade
- Member of: Cruel Youth
- Producer(s): Martin Kierszenbaum, will.i.am
- Spouse: Willy Moon (m. 2014)

Natalia Noemi "Teddy" Sinclair (née Cappuccini; born 15 August 1986) is an English singer-songwriter and actress. She has recorded music under various aliases, most famously as Natalia Kills. She is currently the lead vocalist of the band Cruel Youth.

As Natalia Kills, Sinclair signed a triple joint venture recording contract with will.i.am Music Group, KonLive Distribution and Cherrytree Records to release her debut album, Perfectionist (2011). The album spawned the moderately successful singles "Mirrors" and "Free" (featuring will.i.am), with both singles certified gold by the BVMI. The same year, she co-performed with American EDM duo LMFAO on their hit single "Champagne Showers", which became her most successful recording to date. Although Perfectionist underperformed commercially, its follow up, Trouble (2013) performed slightly better in the United States. She adopted the first name Teddy in 2015 and formed her own band Cruel Youth the following year, with whom she has released the extended play (EP), +30mg (2016).

Outside of her own recordings, Sinclair has written songs for Blackpink, Angel Haze, Madonna, and Rihanna. She received a Grammy Award nomination in 2017 for co-writing Rihanna's single "Kiss It Better". In March 2015, Sinclair and her husband Willy Moon were fired as co-judges from New Zealand X Factor for their harsh comments towards a contestant.

== Life and career ==
=== 1986–2010: Early life and career beginnings ===
Sinclair was born as Natalia Noemi Cappuccini on 15 August 1986 in Bradford, West Yorkshire, to a British father of Afro-Jamaican heritage and a Uruguayan mother, and attended Bradford Girls' Grammar School. Her family left Bradford when she was a teenager and she spent time traveling between England, Jamaica and Spain.

She ran away from home when she was 14 and shifted her focus away from acting. She has described her teenage years as "degenerate," stating that she tried to set her ex-boyfriend's house on fire while both were in it. She had frequent legal trouble and periodically experienced suicidal depression. She was also briefly involved with a religious cult.

She began pursuing a music career and had a significant breakthrough as Candy Rapper in 2003, when she won a BBC Radio 1 MC Battle in Leeds. "Next Big Me", released under the name Verbalicious, was used in the movie Sleepover in 2004. She signed to the UK record company Adventures in Music and released her debut single "Don't Play Nice" under the name Verbalicious in February 2005. Sinclair told W that her childhood nickname from her mother was "Verbal" because she talked and sang a lot. She adopted the name and variations of it as her stage name at some points during her career.

In 2007, while writing music for films, she released Womannequin, a collection of songs she produced and wrote under the name Natalia Cappuccini, to MySpace. The EP received 2 million plays on the website, and she reached the top of the unsigned artists chart. During this time, using the name Verse, she also co-wrote and appeared on "They Talk Shit About Me" by French recording artist M. Pokora and met Guillaume Doubet, who would go on to direct many of her videos, in Paris. Sinclair moved to Los Angeles in 2008. Arriving without money or a place to live, Sinclair "lived out of these motels, bumming around, trying to work with or make songs with anyone who would have me for a couple of hours in the studio". At the time she says she did awful things adding "I was just trying to survive and I was too young to know better." While in L.A., a DJ introduced her to will.i.am after hearing her demo and learning that she did not have a record deal. In January 2009 will.i.am signed her to his record label, will.i.am Music Group. "We had a really good creative chemistry," she said in a 2011 Billboard interview.

=== 2010–2014: Perfectionist and Trouble ===
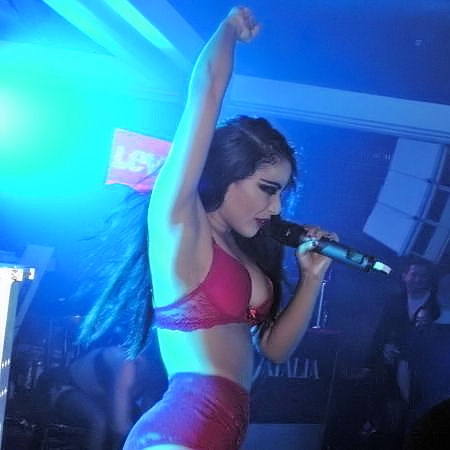
Natalia Kills at the Neidklub in Hamburg in 2010.

Sinclair adopted the stage name Natalia Kills from the interjection "you killed it!", after her record company advised her that her legal name, Natalia Cappuccini, was "indescribable." Kills released her debut album Perfectionist in Germany in April 2011 following the release of her first single, "Mirrors", which hit the German Top 10. The album was described as a concept album by Sinclair, claiming that everybody is a perfectionist. The album was accompanied by four singles, "Mirrors", "Wonderland", "Free" and "Kill My Boyfriend". Through 2010 and 2011 Sinclair opened for Kelis, Robyn, Kesha, Katy Perry and the Black Eyed Peas over various tours. Sinclair was featured in LMFAO's single, "Champagne Showers," and in Junior Caldera's single "Lights Out (Go Crazy)".

On 14 September 2012, Sinclair unveiled the video for "Controversy" to start promotion of her second studio album, Trouble. The album was centered on her troubled childhood. Sinclair attended an after-party for the 2013 MTV Video Music Awards, held on 25 August 2013 in Brooklyn, New York City, where she performed various songs from Trouble. Two days later, "Outta Time" was released as the album's second promotional recording free of charge in a Polydor Records newsletter, coinciding with the US release of Trouble. Trouble was officially released on 3 September 2013 as a digital download in the United States and Canada.

=== 2015: The X Factor New Zealand ===
It was announced in late 2014 that Sinclair and husband Willy Moon would be featured as judges and mentors the following year on season 2 of the New Zealand version of The X Factor, serving as the mentors of the Boys and Groups categories respectively. During the first live show, in a highly publicized scandal which Sinclair later described as a "publicity stunt resulting in a viral media storm and global witch-hunt" that "[she] couldn't defend [herself] against due to a wide-reaching legal gagging order", the two made scathing remarks towards Over 25s contestant Joe Irvine. Sinclair described Irvine as a doppelganger over his alleged copying of Moon's hairstyle and dress sense, deeming him "cheesy" and "disgusting", and accusing him of lacking artistic integrity. Moon also berated Irvine by likening him to a serial killer. The comments led to widespread condemnation on social media, including a petition to have Sinclair and Moon fired from the show, which reportedly received over 70,000 signatures within 24 hours. The show's sponsors, franchise owner and judges Melanie Blatt and Stan Walker also voiced disapproval of the incident, and Moon and Sinclair were both fired from the show the next day. Sinclair was replaced by Natalie Bassingthwaighte, a former judge on the Australian version of the show, while Moon was replaced by Shelton Woolright.

After she was fired from The X Factor, it was revealed in the media that Sinclair had left her record label, Cherrytree Records, shortly before appearing on the show. Sinclair confirmed to Billboard that while she was no longer signed to Cherrytree, she was still with Interscope Records at the time, though she later left them too.

=== 2016–present: Cruel Youth and other ventures ===
In early 2016, Sinclair started a band, Cruel Youth, with her husband Moon. The band's first single, "Mr. Watson", was released on SoundCloud in February, followed by "Diamond Days" in April. Their third single, "Hatefuck", was released in early September, along with the release of their debut EP, +30mg, on 16 September 2016. In 2015 Sinclair also co-wrote Rihanna's song "Kiss It Better", which went on to a Grammy nomination the following year.

In 2018, Cruel Youth released the singles "Devil in Paradise" and "Portrait of a Female".

In 2020, Sinclair collaborated with Cyndi Lauper for the Apple+ TV show Central Park on a song called "Rats".

In 2022, Sinclair and Moon received songwriting credits for "The Happiest Girl" on Blackpink's Born Pink album and released the single "Mr. Badman" in 2022 as part of the soundtrack for The Invitation.

In 2023, Cruel Youth released the single "Sunny", a cover of the same-titled song by Bobby Hebb.

== Personal life ==
Sinclair married singer Willy Moon on 23 May 2014 in New York City. In May 2021, the couple lost their apartment along with all their belongings in a fire.

=== Health ===
On April 18, 2025, Teddy revealed on social media that she had recently undergone brain surgery to treat trigeminal neuralgia, a condition that causes severe facial pain.

== Style and influences ==
Sinclair has mentioned Kate Bush and Alanis Morissette as her most important musical influences, describing them as emotional artists "who write honestly about their opinions and experiences." She has also quoted author Sylvia Plath and Ronnie Spector as two of her biggest inspirations for International Women's Day in 2019. The singer also stated she considered Gwen Stefani, who is a musical and stylistic inspiration, as her "hero", adding that Prince, Vanity 6, and Freddie Mercury have already inspired her during live performances. Sinclair explores music that is both confessional and bold when looking for inspiration, she reveals: "I don't listen to music to let go, I listen to dive in", listing Hole, Marilyn Manson, and Eminem among her favorite artists and bands with whom she grew up. According to Jon O'Brien of AllMusic, Sinclair gradually composed a musical tone incorporating "the theatrical dance-pop of Lady Gaga, 1940s film noir, and the electro-gloom of Depeche Mode." Sinclair also cited Hole and Garbage as influences for her band Cruel Youth.

== Discography ==
- Perfectionist (2011)
- Trouble (2013)

== Tours ==
Promotional concerts

- Perfectionist Promo Tour^{[a]} (2011)
- Effect Music Tour ^{[b]} (2013)
- Trouble Promo Tour^{[c]} (2013)

Co-headlining tours

- The Cherrytree Pop Alternative Tour^{[d]} (2011–12)

Opening act

- Kelis, Robyn – All Hearts Tour (2010)
- Robyn – Body Talk Tour (2010–11)
- The Black Eyed Peas – The Beginning Massive Stadium Tour (2011)
- Kesha – Get Sleazy Tour (2011)
- The Sounds – Something to Die For Tour (2011)
- Katy Perry – California Dreams Tour (2011)
- LMFAO – Sorry for Party Rocking Tour (2012)
- Kiiara – Low Kii Savage Tour (2016)

Notes
^{a} This 58 dates promotional tour started on 24 June 2011 in Paris and ended on 22 November 2011 in Vancouver, Canada.
^{b} This promotional tour took place in Russia.
^{c} This promotional tour took place in the United States.
^{d} This tour was performed with other artists from the same record label.

== Filmography ==
Year	Title	Role	Notes
1995	New Voices	Pearl	Episode: "The Treasure of Zavimbi"
2002–2004	All About Me	Sima	Main cast
2003	Casualty	Samina Khan	Episode: "Stuck in the Middle with You"
2003	Coronation Street	Laura Mangen	2 episodes
2004	Doctors	Hazel Perry	Episode: "A Decisive Moment"
2004	Blue Murder	Anisa Khan	Episode: "Fragile Relations"
2005	No Angels	Sujata	Series 2, episode 7
2006	Silent Witness	Kelly Wetherby	Episode: "Supernova: Part 1"
2006	Tripping Over	Julie	2 episodes
2007	Cape Wrath	Kerry	Episode: "Pilot"
2015	The X Factor	Judge	Series 2; auditions – live shows 1

Radio
Year	Title	Role	Notes
2003	One Thousand Days, One Thousand Nights	Jyoti	Afternoon Play
2003	Tarnished Wings	Jen	Afternoon Play
2003	The Archers	Amy Franks	Main cast

Web
Year	Title	Role	Notes
2010	Love, Kills XX	Herself	Web series; 10 episodes

== Awards and nominations ==
Year	Awards	Work	Category	Result
2005	Popjustice £20 Music Prize	"Don't Play Nice"	Best British Pop Single	Nominated
2011	Eska Music Awards	Herself	International New Face	Won
2013	MP3 Music Awards	"Saturday Night"	The BFV Award	Won
2014	MP3 Music Awards	"Trouble"	The MIC Award	Nominated
2017	Grammy Awards	"Kiss It Better"	Best R&B Song (as songwriter)	Nominated
2024	Hollywood Music in Media Awards	"Hotel Cocaine"	Best Main Title - TV Show/Limited Series	Nominated
2025	Black Reel TV Awards	"Crown Don't Make You King" (as Cruel Youth)	Outstanding Original Song	Nominated
