= Benoît Poher =

French singer

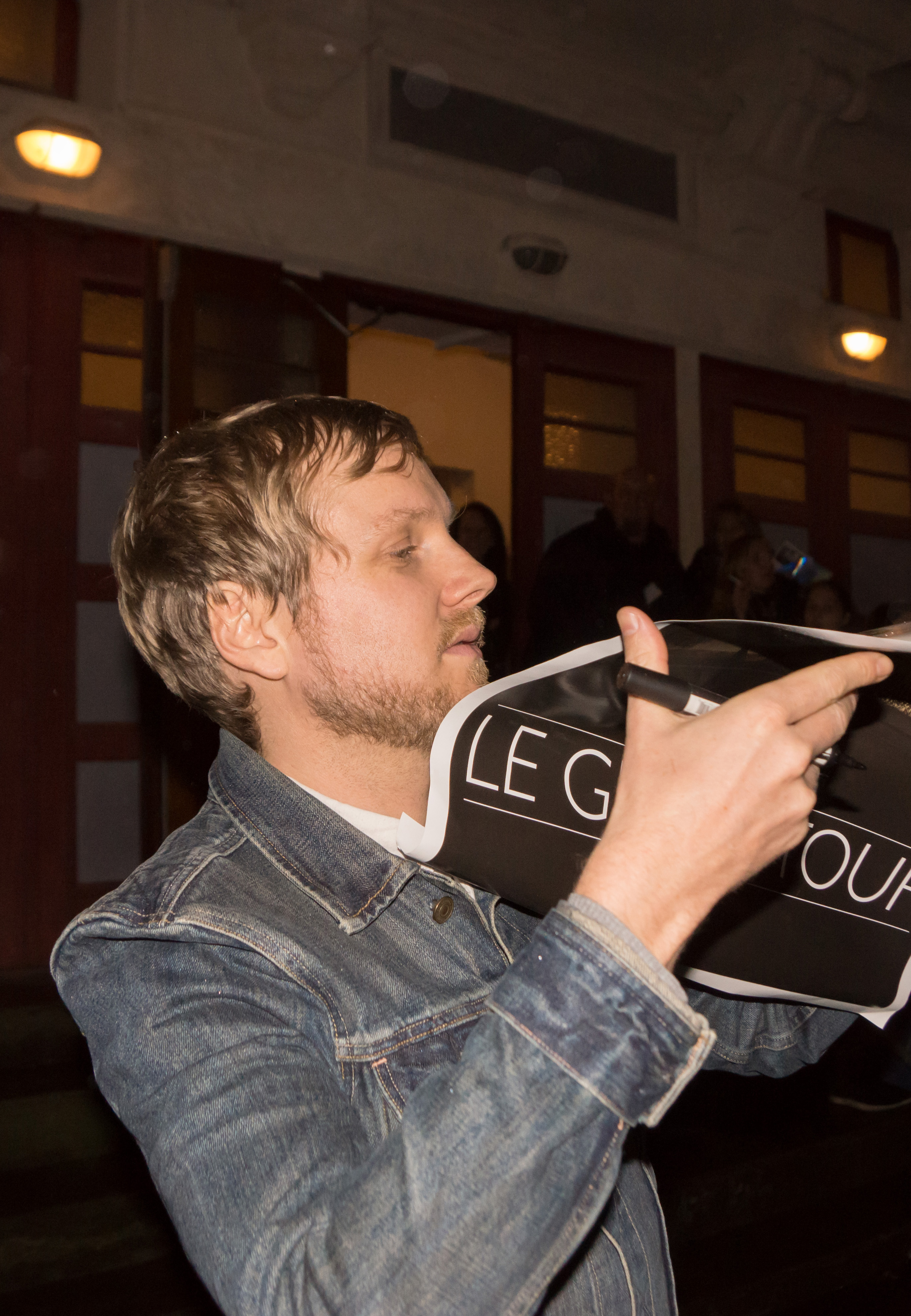

Background information
- Also known as: Ben Poher
- Born: 27 June 1979 (age 47); Mantes-la-Jolie, Île-de-France, France
- Genres: Pop rock; alternative rock; alternative metal; musical theatre; pop
- Occupations: Singer; songwriter; record producer; musician
- Instruments: Vocals; guitar; bass
- Years active: 1997–present

Benoît Poher (French pronunciation: [bənwa pɔɛʁ]; born 27 June 1979) is a French singer, songwriter and lyricist. He is the lead singer of French rock band Kyo and was the lead singer in the supergroup Empyr.

== Early life ==
Poher was born in Mantes-la-Jolie, Yvelines, in the western suburbs of Paris to musician parents. He pursued a musical life while at Ensemble scolaire Notre-Dame "Les Oiseaux" (a French junior high school).

== In Kyo ==
While studying at Notre-Dame "Les Oiseaux" in 1994, Poher met the brothers Fabien and Florian Dubois, and Nicolas Chassagne. They formed a rock band later known as Kyo in 1997. Originally Benoît was a bass player in the band before taking over as lead vocals because of his powerful voice. The band continued practicing and performing and in 2000 released an independent self-titled album Kyo. But it was with their follow-up album le chemin in 2003 that made it to number 2 on the French Albums Chart. The third album 300 Lésions made it to the top of the French Albums Chart in 2004, before the band announced they were discontinuing.

== Fight Aids collective ==
Benoît Poher was heavily involved with his bandmates in the HIV/AIDS campaign, forming Fight Aids, a French collective that released the charity song "L'Or de nos vies". The song was written by Poher with his band Kyo. Artists taking part were: Anggun, Bénabar, Amel Bent, Patrick Bruel, Corneille, Emma Daumas, Jenifer, Kyo, Leslie, Emmanuel Moire, M. Pokora, Roch Voisine, Stéphanie de Monaco, Tété. The revenues from the sale of the single and downloads was donated to F.A.M. (Fight Aids Monaco) charity, in support of building a house called "maison de vie" (house of life) near Avignon which offers both psychological and material aid to persons living with either HIV and AIDS and their families. The song released on 28 July 2006 received wide media coverage and reached number 5 in SNEP, the French singles chart. NRJ 12 also broadcast on 15 August 2006, a 24-minute documentary about "making of" of the music video and interviews with participating artists.

== In Empyr ==
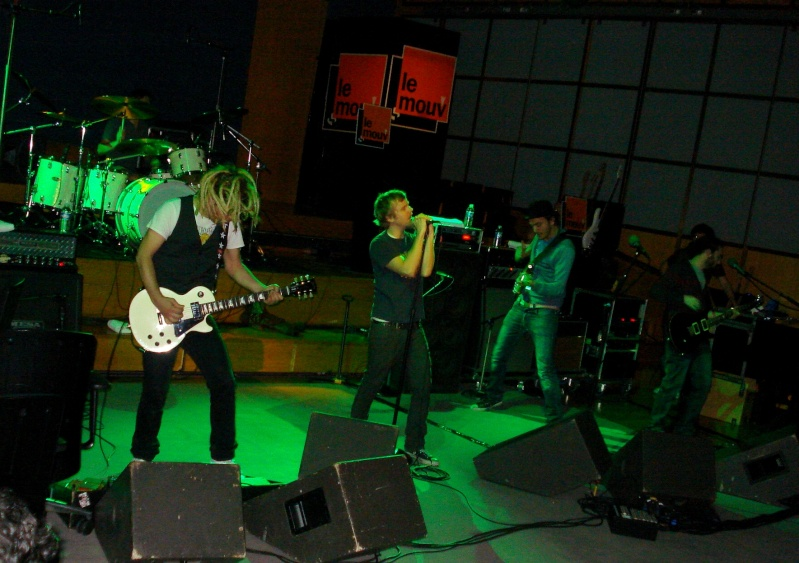
Benoît Poher in Empyr.

After the disbandment of Kyo, in 2007, Poher with another Kyo colleague Florian Dubous joined a French English-language rock band called Empyr, a supergroup that besides Poher (lead vocalist of the band) and Dubos from Kyo on guitars, it included Frédéric Duquesne of Watcha on guitar, Benoît Julliard of band Pleymo on bass and Jocelyn Moze of Vegastar on drums. The debut album in 2008 called The Peaceful Riot charted in France reaching number 17 in France and number 20 in Belgian French charts, also charting in Switzerland. Their first single "New Day" has gained great recognition and radio play. The band released an EP Your Skin My Skin in 2009 and a second album Unicorn in 2011.

== Songwriting / Composing ==
Besides writing materials for Kyo and Empyr, Poher has written lyrics and composed songs for a number of well-known artists. He wrote the lyrics for two singles for Sita (full name Sita Vermeulen) that were included in her album L'envers du Décor in 2004, namely the title track "L'envers du Décor" and a second hit "Rien à perdre".

In 2005, he also composed the song "Ma religion" for famous French rock musician Johnny Hallyday. The song was included in Hallyday's album Ma vérité. In 2005, he composed the theme music for Allo Quiche, a French television series broadcast on the French Canal+ network. In 2005, he composed for Jenifer the single "Le souvenir de ce jour" and in 2006 the single "Regarde-nous" for Emma Daumas and in 2007, "Le Sourire" for Emmanuel Moire. In 2011, he wrote "Je reste" for Amel Bent. He also wrote for the French singer Cocovan.

Poher has written for a number of famous stage acts. He wrote "Mon essentiel" for the French musical comedy Le Roi Soleil, and co-wrote the song "Une autre vie" of the French stage production Cléopâtre, as well as "Le Ciel et l'Enfer" for the French musical production Dracula, l'amour plus fort que la mort.

== In Kyo comeback (2013) ==
In July 2013, Poher announced he was joining his old bandmates in Kyo for a comeback and launched the band's new album L'équilibre in 2014 with two single releases, the title track "L'équilibre" and the single "Le Graal", both with accompanying music videos.

== Personal life ==
On 25 August 2007, Benoît married Laetitia after a long relationship stretching to their adolescence. The couple have a son, Joshua, born in 2010.

His reputation was marred by his vocal support of the controversial French 2006 law DADVSI (the abbreviation of the French Loi sur le Droit d'Auteur et les Droits Voisins dans la Société de l'Information (in English: "law on authors' rights and related rights in the information society)), particularly after he cited a similar law in China that had led to the arrests of several offenders. However he disassociated himself of any further support in an interview in 2011.

== Discography ==
For discography with Kyo, see discography
For discography with Empyr, see discography
