= Chemin =

Chemin or Le Chemin may refer to:

== Arts and media ==
- Le Chemin (Emmanuel Moire album), 2013 album by French singer Emmanuel Moire
- Le Chemin (Kyo album), 2003 album by French band Kyo
  - "Le Chemin" (song), title song from same-titled Kyo album

== Places ==
- Chemin, Jura, France
- Chemin, Valais, Switzerland
- Le Chemin, France, commune in the Marne department in the Champagne-Ardenne region in north-eastern France

== People with surname Chemin ==
- Ariane Chemin (born 1962), French journalist
- Jean-Yves Chemin (born 1959), French mathematician

== Other uses ==
- CheMin, short for Chemistry and Mineralogy, an instrument located in the interior of the Curiosity rover, that is exploring the surface of Gale crater on Mars

== See also ==
- Chemin de fer (disambiguation)
