= Danse avec les Stars fête Noël =

- Promotional advertisement for the Christmas Special of Danse avec les Stars
- Celebrity winner: Amel Bent
- Professional winner: Christophe Licata
- No. of episodes: 1

Release
- Original network: TF1
- Original release: 22 December 2012

Season chronology
- ← Previous; 3 Next → 4

Danse avec les Stars fête Noël is the first Christmas Special of the French version of Strictly Come Dancing, broadcast in prime time on 22 December 2012, three weeks after the conclusion of the third season.

The two-and-a-half-hour program featured nine of the most impressive celebrities of the first three seasons of the show, paired with their respective professional ballroom dancers, with the exception of season 2 winner Shy'm, who's been a judge since season 3, and season 1's second runner-up David Ginola. As a result, non-Top 3 contestants Francis Lalanne (from season 2) and Lorie (from season 3) were brought in.

The program, once again hosted by Sandrine Quétier and Vincent Cerutti, saw each of the four judges award up to twenty points per contestant (ten for artistic and ten for technical performance) before choosing their favorite at the end, awarding him or her additional ten points. Unlike the regular shows, the special was prerecorded and as such featured no audience voting whatsoever.

== Participants ==
=== Season 1 ===
- Matt Pokora (winner)
- Sofia Essaïdi (second place)

=== Season 2 ===
- Philippe Candeloro (second place)
- Baptiste Giabiconi (third place)
- Francis Lalanne (fifth place)

=== Season 3 ===
- Emmanuel Moire (winner)
- Amel Bent (second place)
- Taïg Khris (third place)
- Lorie (fourth place and early favorite)
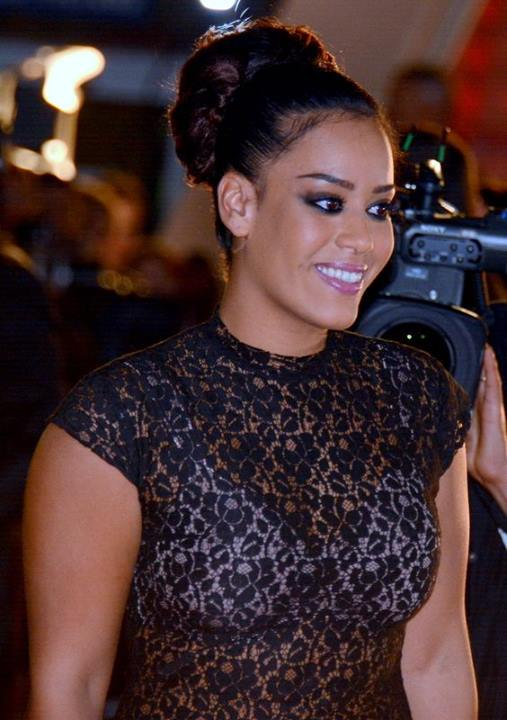
Amel Bent

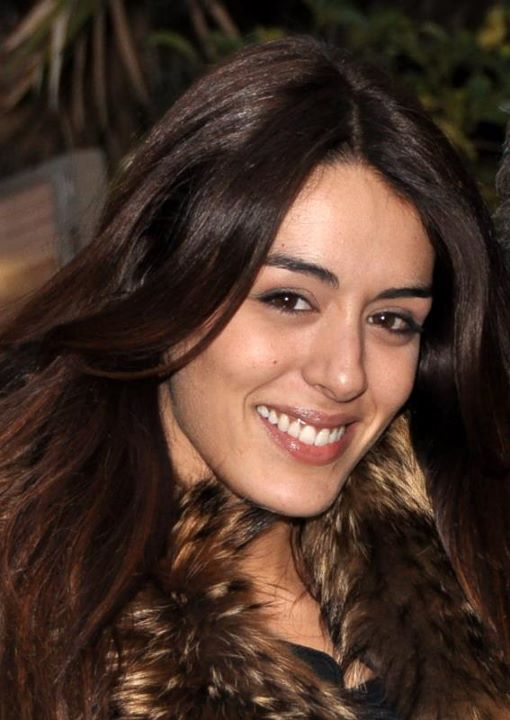
Sofia Essaïdi

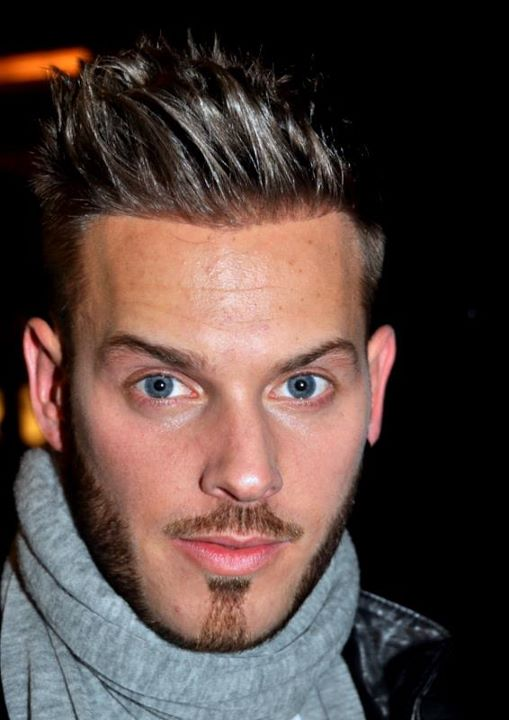
Matt Pokora

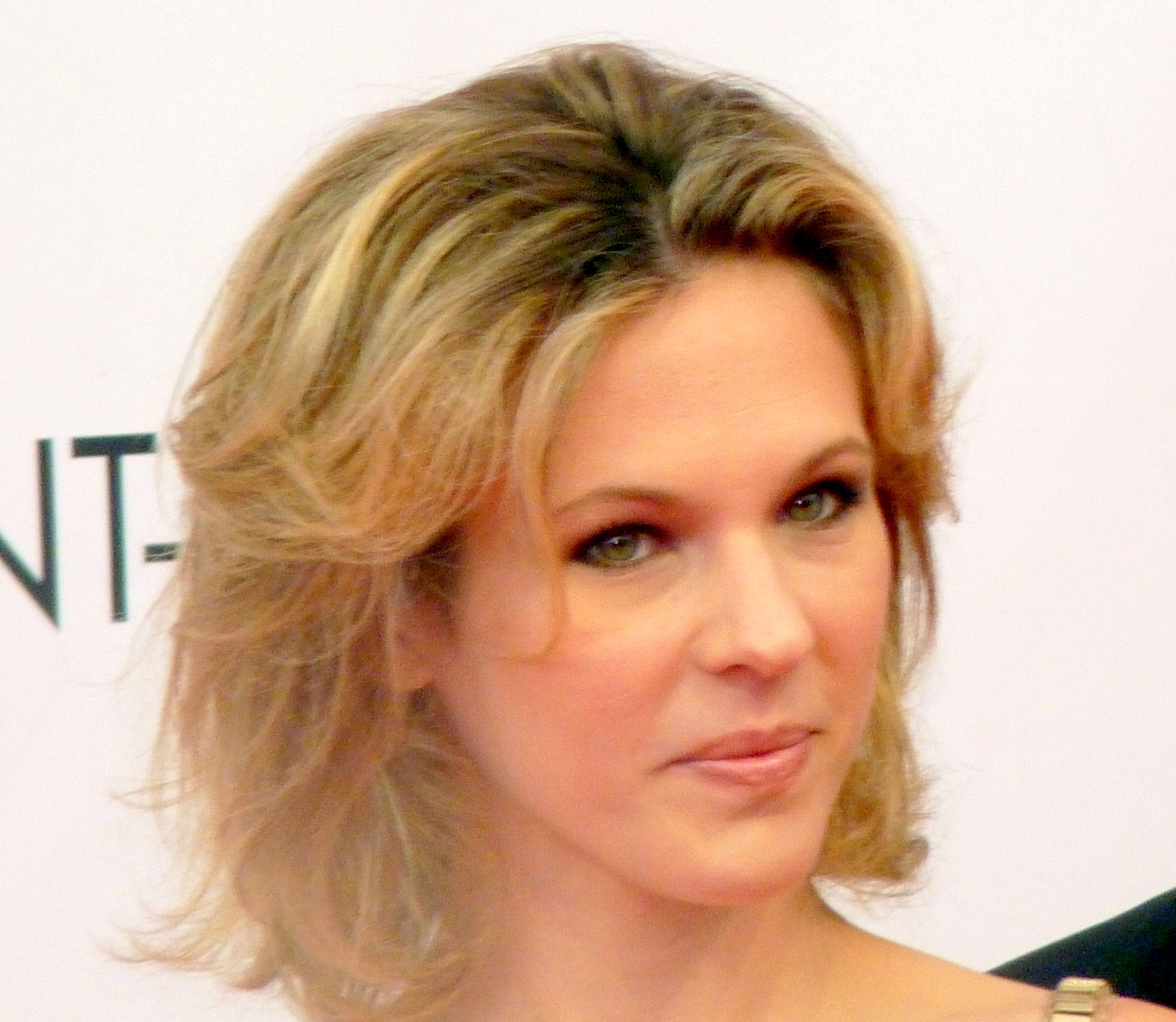
Lorie

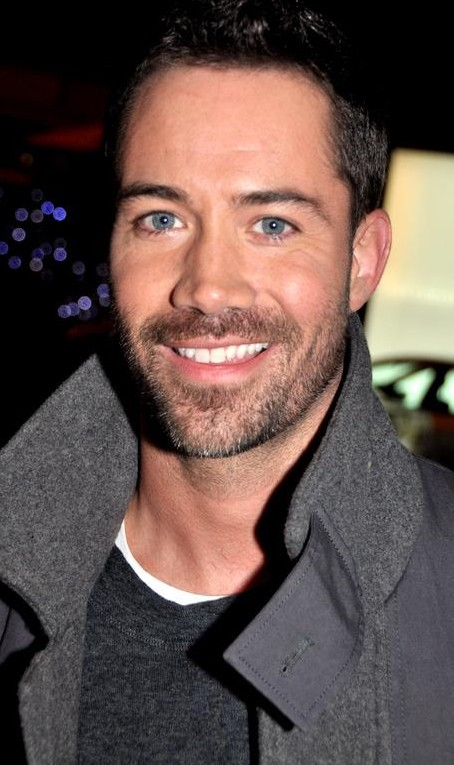
Emmanuel Moire

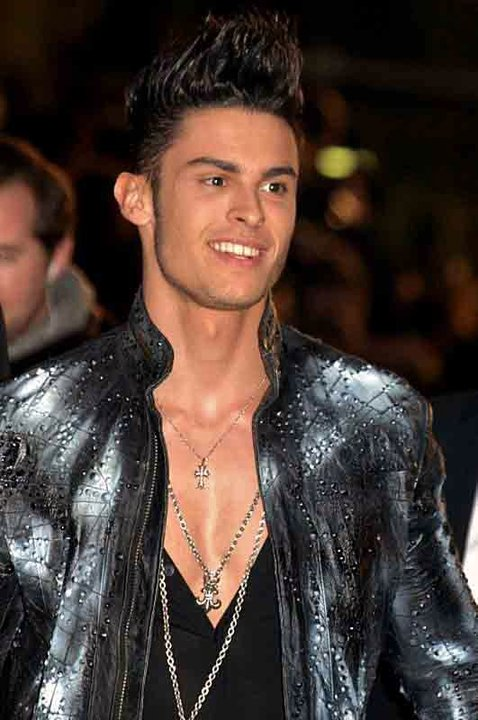
Baptiste Giabiconi

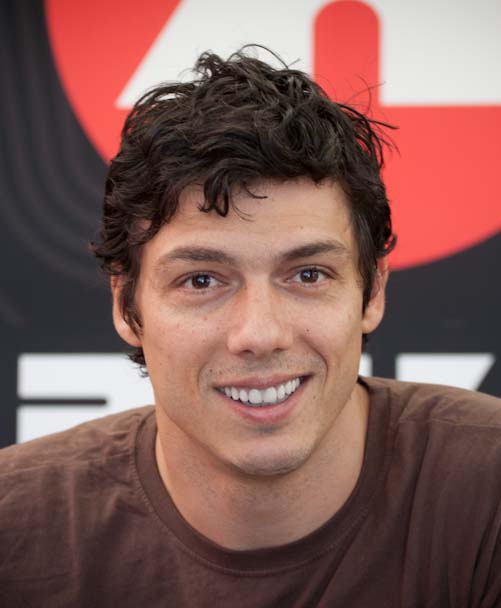
Taïg Khris

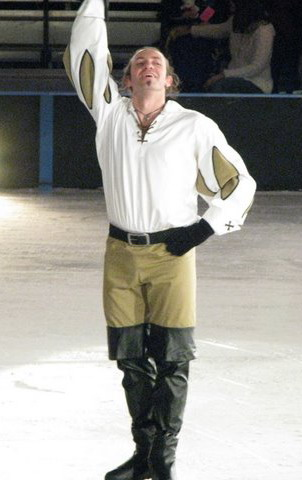
Philippe Candeloro

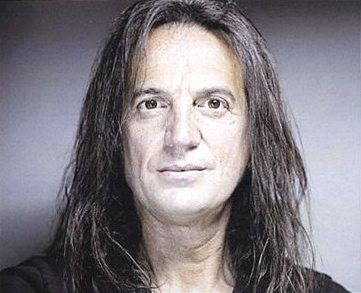
Francis Lalanne

== Scoring ==
Team	Place	1
Amel & Christophe	1	80+20=100
Sofia & Maxime	2	80+10=90
Matt & Katrina	3	79+10=89
Lorie & Christian	4	80+0=80
Emmanuel & Fauve	5	77+0=77
Baptiste & Fauve	6	67+0=67
Taïg & Denitsa	7	61+0=61
Philippe & Candice	7	61+0=61
Francis & Silvia	9	56+0=56

Red numbers indicate the couples with the lowest score.
Blue numbers indicate the couples with the highest score.
indicates the winning couple.
indicates the runner-up couple.
indicates the third place couple.
