= Danse avec les stars season 3 =

Danse avec les stars
- Season 3
- Promotional advertisement for the 3rd season of Danse avec les Stars; L to R: Chimène Badi, Emmanuel Moire, Amel Bent, Christophe Dominici, Estelle Lefébure, Taïg Khris, Laura Flessel, Gérard Vivès, Lorie and Bastian Baker
- Celebrity winner: Emmanuel Moire
- Professional winner: Fauve Hautot
- No. of episodes: 9

Release
- Original network: TF1
- Original release: October 6 – December 1, 2012

Season chronology
- ← Previous; Season 2 Next → Danse avec les Stars fête Noël

The third season of the French version of Strictly Come Dancing debuted on TF1 on October 6, 2012. 10 celebrities were paired with 10 professional ballroom dancers. Sandrine Quétier and Vincent Cerutti return as the hosts for this season.

== Participants ==
The participants of the season were officially announced by TF1 on September 18, 2012, though they were leaked a few days earlier by various media outlets.

Celebrity	Notability (known for)	Professional partner	Status
Christophe Dominici†	Former rugby union player	Candice Pascal	Eliminated 1st on 13 October 2012
Laura Flessel	Olympic épée fencer	Grégoire Lyonnet	Eliminated 2nd on 20 October 2012
Chimène Badi	Soul singer	Julien Brugel	Eliminated 3rd on 27 October 2012
Bastian Baker	Singer-songwriter	Katrina Patchett	Eliminated 4th on 3 November 2012
Estelle Lefébure	Fashion model & actress	Maxime Dereymez	Eliminated 5th on 10 November 2012
Gérard Vivès	Television presenter	Silvia Notargiacomo	Eliminated 6th on 17 November 2012
Lorie	Singer & actress	Christian Millette	Eliminated 7th on 24 November 2012
Taïg Khris	Professional vert skater	Denitsa Ikonomova	Third Place on 1 December 2012
Amel Bent	R&B singer	Christophe Licata	Second Place on 1 December 2012
Emmanuel Moire	Singer & eclectic artist	Fauve Hautot	Winners on 1 December 2012

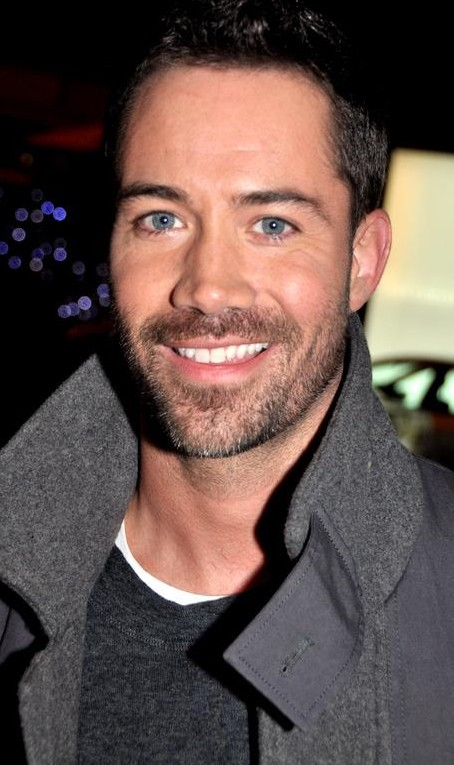
Emmanuel Moire

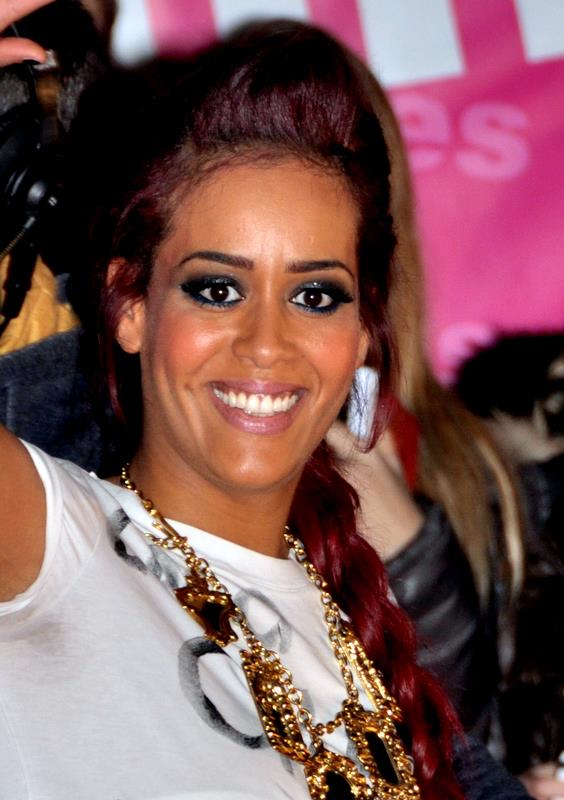
Amel Bent

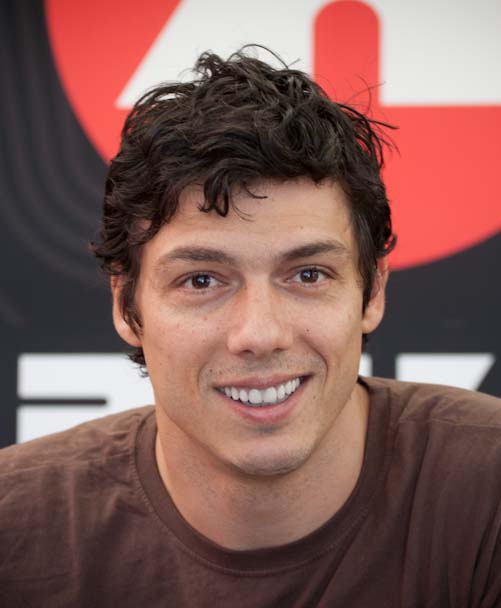
Taïg Khris

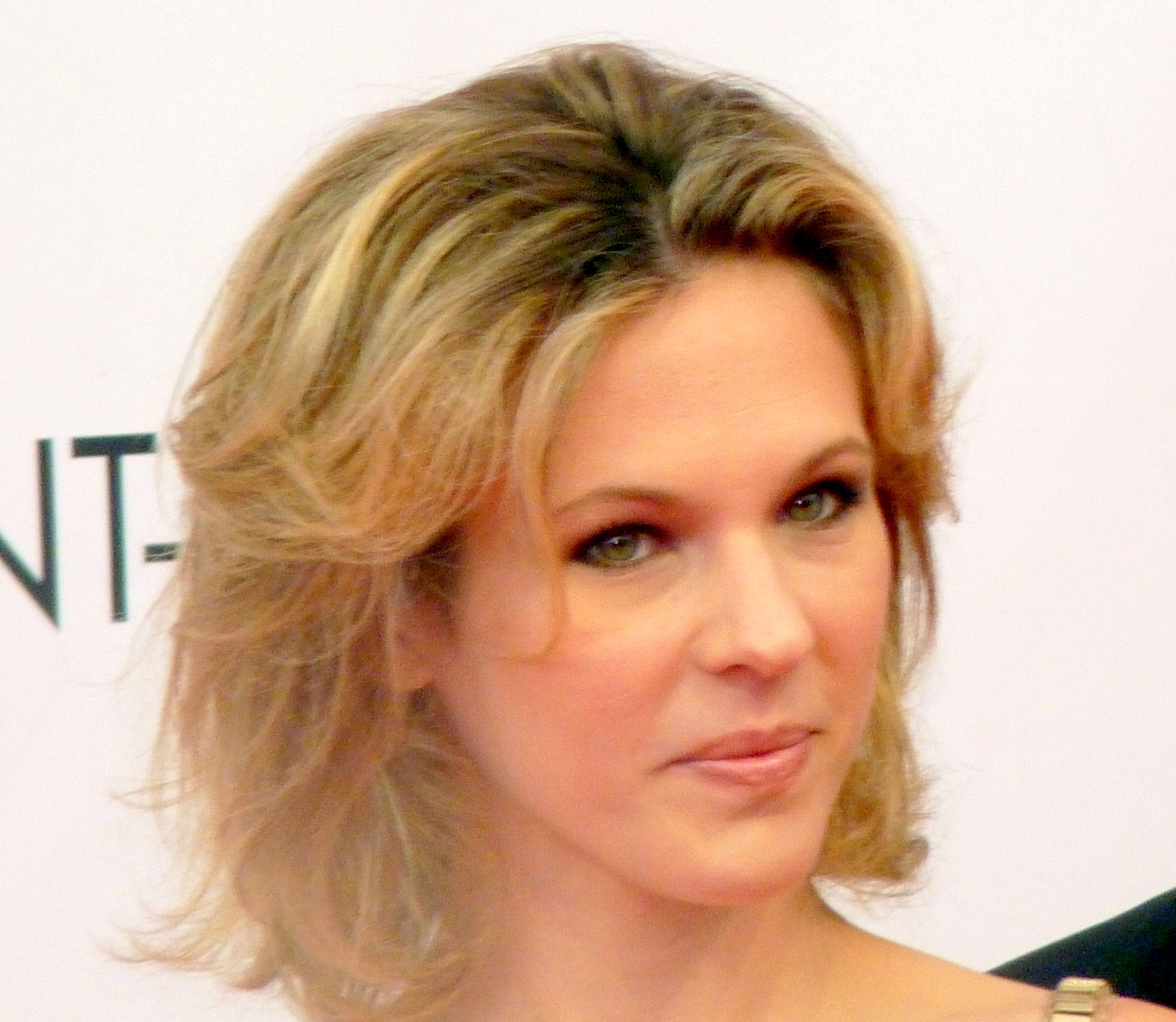
Lorie

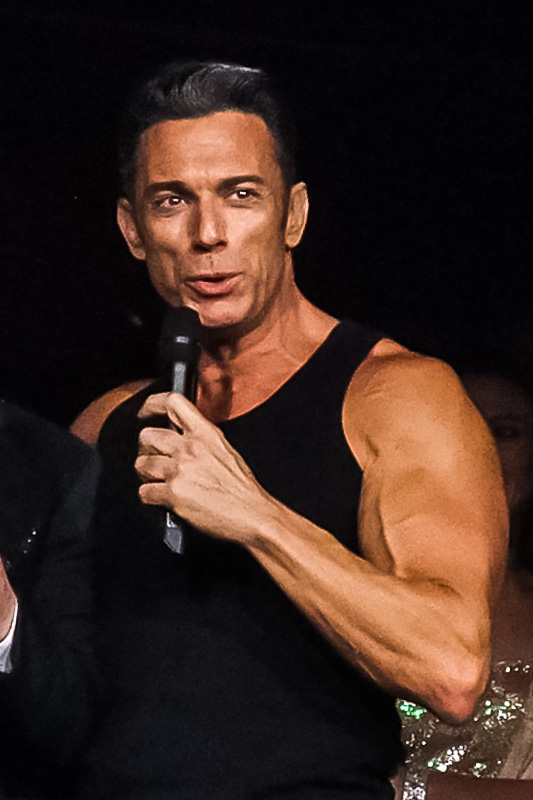
Gérard Vivès
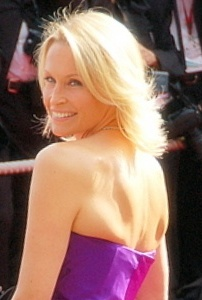
Estelle Lefébure

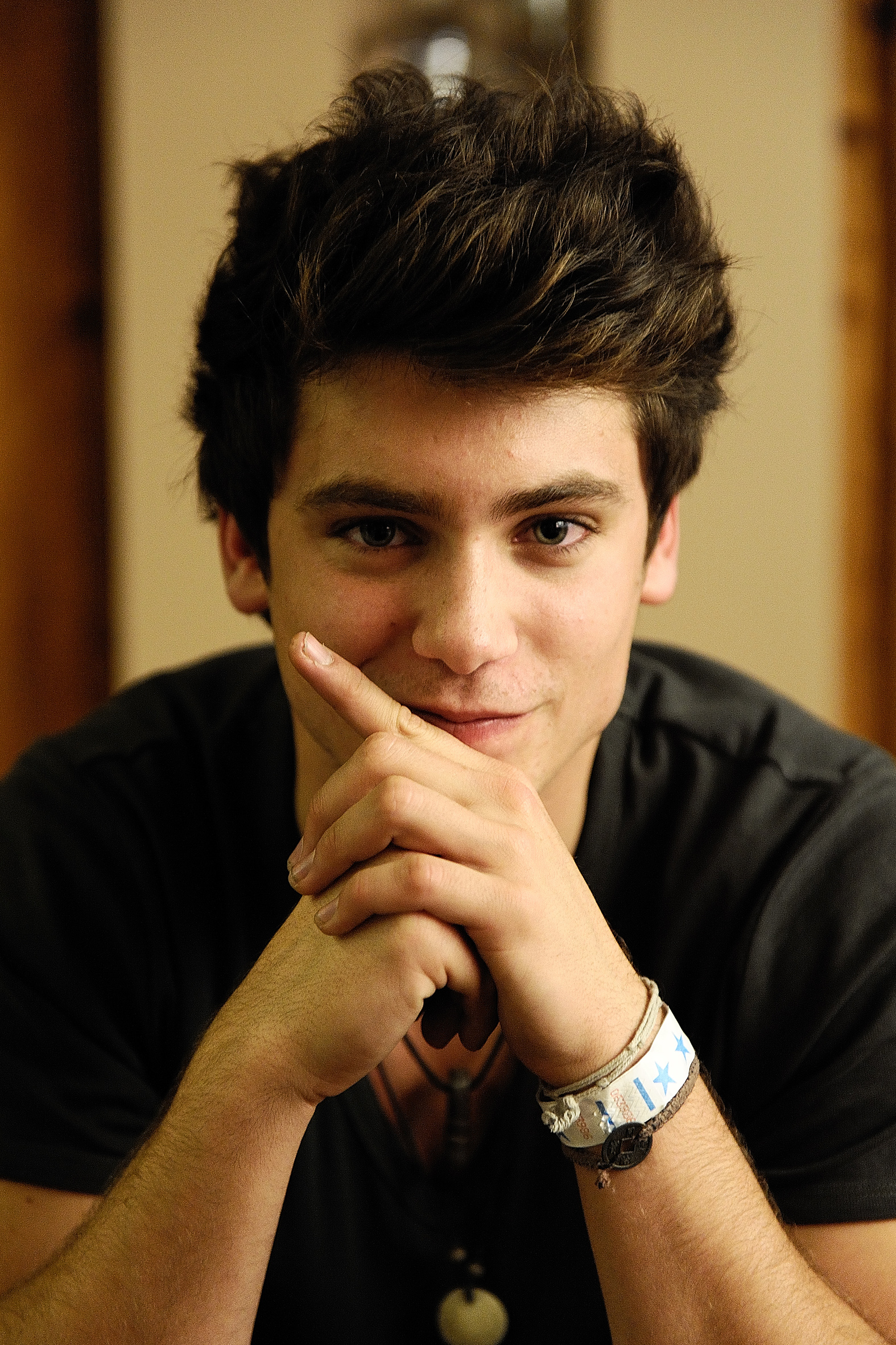
Bastian Baker

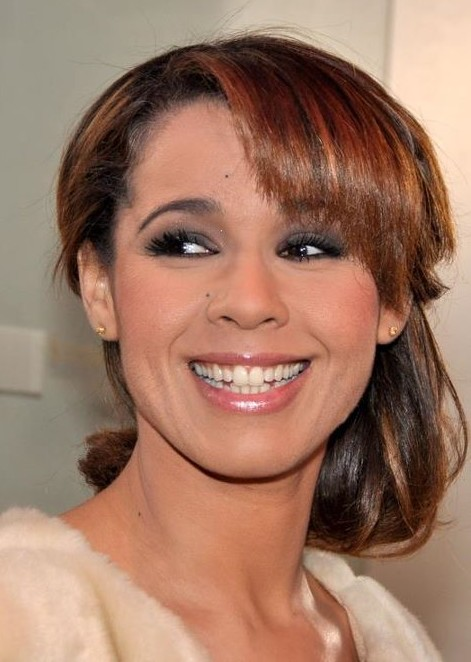
Chimène Badi

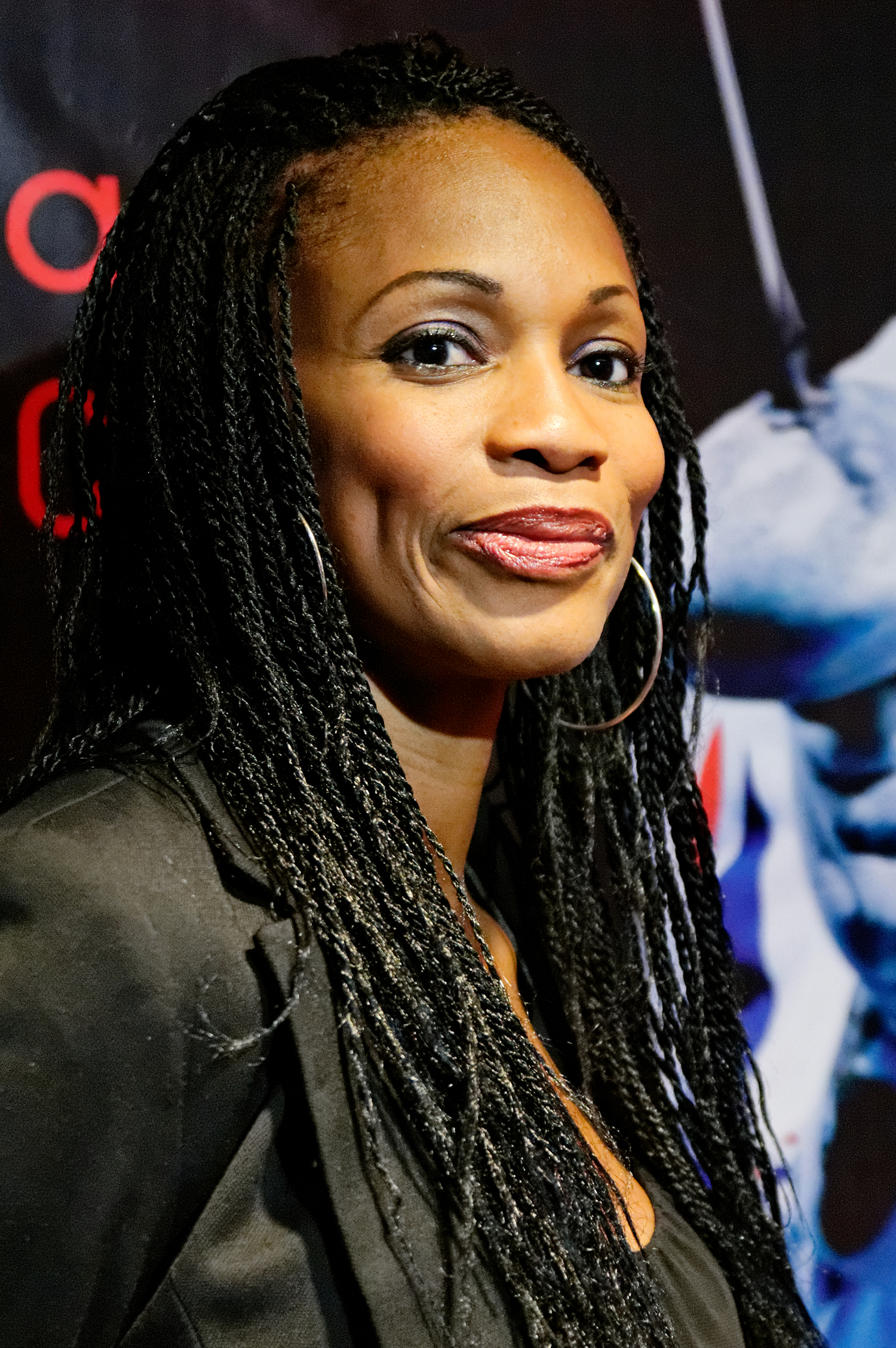
Laura Flessel

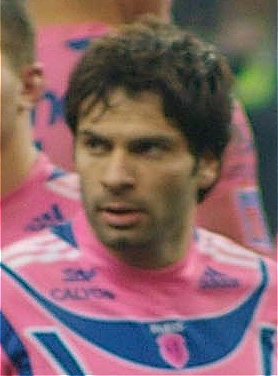
Christophe Dominici

== Controversies ==
- On the eve of the program's premiere, two participants, singers Lorie and Amel Bent, were accused by the magazine Oops of "cheating" by having started their training much earlier than the other contestants. Both girls went on to share the top spot on the show's first and second broadcast.
- The hiring of singer Shy'm, the previous season's winner, as a fourth judge has drawn some criticism about her legitimacy compared to her professional dancer colleagues, as well as cast doubt on her objectivity due to her friendly acquaintance of several contestants, such as Lorie, Chimène Badi and Amel Bent.

== Scoring ==
Team	Place	1	2	1+2	3	4	5	6	7	8	9
Emmanuel & Fauve	1	31	34	65	58 + 0 = 58	61 + 2 = 63	74 + 16 = 90	59 + 57 = 116	65 + 64 = 129	67 + 69 + 0 = 136	75 + 74 = 149
Amel & Christophe	2	33	33	66	74 + 0 = 74	67 + 14 = 81	70 + 20 = 90	59 + 72 = 131	72 + 61 = 133	73 + 67 + 10 = 150	74 + 80 = 154
Taïg & Denitsa	3	22	28	50	58 + 10 = 68	71 + 10 = 81	68 + 10 = 78	62 + 61 = 123	47 + 49 = 96	61 + 64 + 0 = 125	70 + 71 = 141
Lorie & Christian	4	33	33	66	59 + 10 = 69	75 + 16 = 91	66 + 18 = 84	62 + 59 = 121	70 + 73 = 143	62 + 72 + 10 = 144	
Gérard & Silvia	5	25	26	51	51 + 10 = 61	48 + 4 = 52	61 + 12 = 73	38 + 52 = 90	60 + 42 = 102		
Estelle & Maxime	6	28	25	53	62 + 0 = 62	68 + 12 = 80	44 + 14 = 58	56 + 53 = 109			
Bastian & Katrina	7	28	28	56	58 + 10 = 68	63 + 8 = 71	49 + 8 = 57				
Chimène & Julien	8	26	21	47	55 + 0 = 55	40 + 6 = 46					
Laura & Grégoire	9	23	24	47	58 + 10 = 68						
Christophe & Candice	10	26	23	49							

Red numbers indicate the couples with the lowest score for each week.
Blue numbers indicate the couples with the highest score for each week.
indicates the couples eliminated that week.
indicates the returning couple that finished in the bottom two.
indicates the winning couple.
indicates the runner-up couple.
indicates the third place couple.

=== Notes of each couples ===
Couple	Total	10	9	8	7	6	5	4	3	2	1	Average
Emmanuel & Fauve	96	11	34	33	9	2	5	2	—N/a			8.2
Amel & Christophe	96	19	47	19	7	1	3	—N/a				8.7
Taïg & Denitsa	96	5	19	30	26	9	7	—N/a				7.6
Lorie & Christian	80	6	33	25	12	3	1	—N/a				8.3
Gérard & Silvia	64	—N/a	1	12	16	19	9	6	1	—N/a		6.3
Estelle & Maxime	48	1	5	8	20	10	2	1	1	—N/a		7
Bastian & Katrina	32	—N/a	4	6	16	3	1	1	1	—N/a		7.1
Chimène & Julien	24	—N/a		2	5	10	4	2	1	—N/a		5.9
Laura & Grégoire	16	—N/a		2	7	5	2	—N/a				6.6
Christophe & Candice	8	—N/a			2	5	1	—N/a				6.1
Total	560	42	143	137	120	67	35	12	4	0	0	7.6

== Averages ==
This table only counts dances scored on the traditional 40-point scale (the scores for the Coach Battle from Week 3 and the Samba Relay from Week 4 are not included).

Rank by average	Place	Couple	Total	Number of dances	Average
1	2	Amel & Christophe	835	13	34.79
2	4	Lorie & Christian	664	11	33.20
3	1	Emmanuel & Fauve	788	13	32.83
4	3	Taïg & Denitsa	732	13	30.50
5	7	Bastian & Katrina	226	5	28.25
6	6	Estelle & Maxime	336	7	28.00
7	9	Laura & Grégoire	105	3	26.25
8	5	Gérard & Silvia	403	9	25.19
9	10	Christophe & Candice	49	2	24.50
10	8	Chimène & Julien	142	4	23.67

== Highest and lowest scoring performances ==
The best and worst performances in each dance according to the judges' marks are as follows:

Dance	Best dancer	Best score	Worst dancer	Worst score
Tango	Emmanuel Moire	37.5	Chimène Badi	20
Cha-Cha-Cha	Amel Bent	33.5	Taïg Khris	22
Quickstep	Amel Bent; Lorie	33	Gérard Vivès	19
Paso Doble	Taïg Khris	35.5	Taïg Khris	23.5
Samba	Lorie	36	Estelle Lefébure	25
Foxtrot	Amel Bent	36	Gérard Vives	21
Jive	Amel Bent	37	Chimène Badi	21
Waltz	Emmanuel Moire	37	Gérard Vives	26
Rumba	Amel Bent	40	Chimène Badi	27.5
Salsa	Taïg Khris	30.5	Estelle Lefébure	22
American Smooth	Amel Bent	35	Lorie	31

== Couples' Highest and lowest scoring performances ==
According to the traditional 40-point scale.

Couples	Highest Scoring Dances	Lowest Scoring Dances
Emmanuel & Fauve	Tango (37.5)	Jive (28.5)
Amel & Christophe	Rumba (40)	Samba (29.5)
Taïg & Denitsa	Paso Doble (35.5)	Cha-Cha-Cha (22)
Lorie & Christian	Rumba (37.5)	Foxtrot; Waltz (29.5)
Gérard & Silvia	Tango (30.5)	Quickstep (19)
Estelle & Maxime	Paso Doble (34)	Salsa (22)
Bastian & Katrina	Rumba (31.5)	Paso Doble (24.5)
Chimène & Julien	Rumba (27.5)	Tango (20)
Laura & Grégoire	Tango (29)	Cha-Cha-Cha (23)
Christophe & Candice	Tango (26)	Foxtrot (23)

== Styles, scores and songs ==
=== Week 1 ===
Individual judges scores in the chart below (given in parentheses) are listed in this order from left to right:: Marie-Claude Pietragalla, Jean-Marc Généreux, Shy'm, Chris Marques.

Running order

Couple	Score	Style	Music
Estelle & Maxime	28 (7,7,7,7)	Tango	Somebody That I Used to Know - Gotye ft. Kimbra
Chimène & Julien	26 (7,7,6,6)	Cha-Cha-Cha	Where Have You Been - Rihanna
Emmanuel & Fauve	31 (8,8,8,7)	Quickstep	The Artist soundtrack - Ludovic Bource
Gérard & Silvia	25 (6,6,6,7)	Cha-Cha-Cha	Call Me Maybe - Carly Rae Jepsen
Laura & Grégoire	23 (7,5,6,5)	Cha-Cha-Cha	Au Bout de Mes Rêves - Jean-Jacques Goldman
Amel & Christophe	33 (9,8,8,8)	Quickstep	Single Ladies (Put a Ring on It) - Beyoncé
Bastian & Katrina	28 (7,7,7,7)	Tango	L'Assasymphonie - Mozart l'opéra rock
Christophe & Candice	26 (7,6,6,7)	Tango	Bohemian Rhapsody - Queen
Lorie & Christian	33 (8,9,8,8)	Quickstep	New York avec toi - Téléphone
Taïg & Denitsa	22 (5,5,6,6)	Cha-Cha-Cha	Billie Jean - Michael Jackson

=== Week 2: Personal Story Week ===
Individual judges scores in the chart below (given in parentheses) are listed in this order from left to right:: Marie-Claude Pietragalla, Jean-Marc Généreux, Shy'm, Chris Marques.

Running order

Couple	Score		Style	Music	Result
Couple	Week 2	Week 1+2	Style	Music	Result
Lorie & Christian	33 (8,9,8,8)	66	Paso Doble	A Prisoner of the Crusades - Michael Kamen	Safe
Estelle & Maxime	25 (7,6,6,6)	53	Samba	Magnolias for Ever - Claude François	Safe
Emmanuel & Fauve	34 (9,8,9,8)	65	Foxtrot	Sois tranquille - Emmanuel Moire	Safe
Gérard & Silvia	26 (7,6,7,6)	51	Jive	I'm Still Standing - Elton John	Safe
Bastian & Katrina	28 (7,7,7,7)	56	Waltz	Hallelujah - Leonard Cohen	Safe
Chimène & Julien	21 (6,5,6,4)	47	Jive	Proud Mary - Ike & Tina Turner	Safe
Christophe & Candice	23 (6,6,6,5)	49	Foxtrot	Ta Main - Grégoire	Eliminated
Taïg & Denitsa	28 (7,7,7,7)	50	Samba	Ai se eu te pego - Michel Teló	Bottom 2
Amel & Christophe	33 (9,8,8,8)	66	Waltz	La Bohème - Charles Aznavour	Safe
Laura & Grégoire	24 (6,6,6,6)	47	Paso Doble	Titanium - David Guetta ft. Sia	Safe
Dance Duel
Taïg & Denitsa	60%		Cha-Cha-Cha	Waka Waka (This Time for Africa) — Shakira	Safe
Christophe & Candice	40%		Cha-Cha-Cha	Waka Waka (This Time for Africa) — Shakira	Eliminated

=== Week 3: 80s Week ===
Individual judges scores in the chart below (given in parentheses) are listed in this order from left to right:: Marie-Claude Pietragalla, Jean-Marc Généreux, Shy'm, Chris Marques.

Running order

Couple	Results			Style	Music	Result
Couple	Artistic	Technical	Total	Style	Music	Result
Lorie & Christian	26 (6,8,7,5)	33 (8,9,8,8)	59	Foxtrot	Plus près des étoiles - Gold	Safe
Emmanuel & Fauve	34 (9,9,8,8)	24 (8,5,6,5)	58	Cha-Cha-Cha	Kiss - Prince	Safe
Gérard & Silvia	26 (7,7,7,5)	25 (6,7,6,6)	51	Paso Doble	Relax - Frankie Goes to Hollywood	Safe
Chimène & Julien	30 (7,7,8,8)	25 (7,6,6,6)	55	Rumba	True Colors - Cyndi Lauper	Safe
Estelle & Maxime	33 (8,8,9,8)	29 (7,8,7,7)	62	Rumba	Femmes je vous aime - Julien Clerc	Safe
Taïg & Denitsa	29 (8,7,7,7)	29 (7,8,7,7)	58	Tango	Sweet Dreams (Are Made of This) - Eurythmics	Bottom 2
Bastian & Katrina	31 (8,8,8,7)	27 (8,7,7,5)	58	Jive	Take On Me - A-ha	Safe
Laura & Grégoire	30 (7,8,8,7)	28 (7,7,7,7)	58	Tango	Sarà perché ti amo - Ricchi e Poveri	Eliminated
Amel & Christophe	38 (10,10,10,8)	36 (10,9,9,8)	74	Jive	Fallait pas commencer - Lio	Safe
Coach Battle
Amel & Christophe; Estelle & Maxime; Chimène & Julien; Emmanuel & Fauve	Losers (chosen by Jean-Marc Généreux)		74; 62; 55; 58	Team Paso Doble (Coaching by Matt Pokora)	Papa Don't Preach - Madonna	
Lorie & Christian; Laura & Grégoire; Gérard & Silvia; Taïg & Denitsa; Bastian & Katrina	Winners (10 bonus points per contestant) (chosen by Marie-Claude Pietragalla, Shy'm and Chris Marques)		69; 68; 61; 68; 68	Team Tango (Coaching by Sofia Essaidi)	En rouge et noir - Jeanne Mas	
Dance Duel
Taïg & Denitsa	74%			Jive	My Sharona - The Knack	Safe
Laura & Grégoire	26%			Jive	My Sharona - The Knack	Eliminated

=== Week 4: Symphony Orchestra Week ===
Individual judges scores in the chart below (given in parentheses) are listed in this order from left to right:: Marie-Claude Pietragalla, Jean-Marc Généreux, Shy'm, Chris Marques.

Running order

Couple	Results			Style	Music	Result
Couple	Artistic	Technical	Total	Style	Music	Result
Emmanuel & Fauve	32 (8,8,8,8)	29 (8,7,7,7)	61	Paso Doble	Smooth Criminal - Michael Jackson	Safe
Chimène & Julien	23 (6,6,6,5)	17 (5,4,5,3)	40	Tango	En apesanteur - Calogero	Eliminated
Amel & Christophe	35 (9,9,9,8)	32 (9,8,8,7)	67	Paso Doble	Party Rock Anthem - LMFAO	Safe
Gérard & Silvia	27 (7,7,7,6)	21 (6,5,6,4)	48	Foxtrot	Feeling Good - Muse	Safe
Bastian & Katrina	35 (9,9,9,8)	28 (8,7,7,6)	63	Rumba	Comme d'habitude - Claude François	Safe
Estelle & Maxime	37 (9,10,9,9)	31 (8,9,7,7)	68	Paso Doble	Poker Face - Lady Gaga	Bottom 2
Taïg & Denitsa	38 (10,9,10,9)	33 (9,8,8,8)	71	Paso Doble	Carmina Burana - Carl Orff	Safe
Lorie & Christian	39 (10,10,10,9)	36 (9,9,9,9)	75	Rumba	Amoureuse - Véronique Sanson	Safe
Samba Relay
Lorie & Christian	+16		91	Samba	I Want You Back - The Jackson 5	
Amel & Christophe	+14		81	Samba	I Want You Back - The Jackson 5	
Estelle & Maxime	+12		80	Samba	I Want You Back - The Jackson 5	
Taïg & Denitsa	+10		81	Samba	I Want You Back - The Jackson 5	
Bastian & Katrina	+8		71	Samba	I Want You Back - The Jackson 5	
Chimène & Julien	+6		46	Samba	I Want You Back - The Jackson 5	
Gérard & Silvia	+4		52	Samba	I Want You Back - The Jackson 5	
Emmanuel & Fauve	+2		63	Samba	I Want You Back - The Jackson 5	
Dance Duel
Estelle & Maxime	67%			Cha-Cha-Cha	Music - John Miles	Safe
Chimène & Julien	33%			Cha-Cha-Cha	Music - John Miles	Eliminated

=== Week 5: Cinema Week ===
Individual judges scores in the chart below (given in parentheses) are listed in this order from left to right:: Marie-Claude Pietragalla, Jean-Marc Généreux, Shy'm, Chris Marques.

Running order

Couple	Results			Style	Music	Result
Couple	Artistic	Technical	Total	Style	Music	Result
Lorie & Christian	35 (9,10,9,7)	31 (9,8,7,7)	66	Cha-Cha-Cha (+Hip-hop)	Back in Time - Pitbull	Safe
Gérard & Silvia	30 (8,8,8,6)	31 (8,8,7,8)	61	Tango (+Argentine tango)	The Imperial March - John Williams	Safe
Estelle & Maxime	26 (7,6,7,6)	18 (6,4,5,3)	44	Salsa (+Porté)	(I've Had) The Time of My Life - Bill Medley & Jennifer Warnes	Safe
Emmanuel & Fauve	39 (10,10,10,9)	35 (9,9,9,8)	74	Waltz (+Fred Astaire style)	Edward Scissorhands soundtrack - Danny Elfman	Safe
Taïg & Denitsa	37 (10,10,9,8)	31 (8,7,8,8)	68	Rumba (+Tied hands)	I Will Always Love You - Whitney Houston	Bottom 2
Bastian & Katrina	27 (9,7,7,4)	22 (7,6,6,3)	49	Paso Doble (+Synchronized back-to-back dancing)	Superman soundtrack - John Williams	Eliminated
Amel & Christophe	36 (9,9,9,9)	34 (8,8,9,9)	70	American Smooth (+Blindfolded)	Kissing You - Des'ree	Safe
Dance Marathon
Amel & Christophe	+20		90	Cha-Cha-Cha	Boogie Wonderland - Earth, Wind & Fire	
Lorie & Christian	+18		84	Cha-Cha-Cha	Boogie Wonderland - Earth, Wind & Fire	
Emmanuel & Fauve	+16		90	Cha-Cha-Cha	Boogie Wonderland - Earth, Wind & Fire	
Estelle & Maxime	+14		58	Cha-Cha-Cha	Boogie Wonderland - Earth, Wind & Fire	
Gérard & Silvia	+12		73	Cha-Cha-Cha	Boogie Wonderland - Earth, Wind & Fire	
Taïg & Denitsa	+10		78	Cha-Cha-Cha	Boogie Wonderland - Earth, Wind & Fire	
Bastian & Katrina	+8		57	Cha-Cha-Cha	Boogie Wonderland - Earth, Wind & Fire	
Dance Duel
Taïg & Denitsa	65%			Cha-Cha-Cha	Ghostbusters - Ray Parker Jr.	Safe
Bastian & Katrina	35%			Cha-Cha-Cha	Ghostbusters - Ray Parker Jr.	Eliminated

=== Week 6: 15 Second Solo Week ===
Individual judges scores in the chart below (given in parentheses) are listed in this order from left to right:: Marie-Claude Pietragalla, Jean-Marc Généreux, Shy'm, Chris Marques.

Running order

Couple	Results				Style	Music	Result
Couple	Artistic	Technical	Total		Style	Music	Result
Lorie & Christian	31 (8,8,8,7)	31 (8,8,8,7)	62	121	Jive	SOS - Rihanna	Safe
Lorie & Christian	29 (7,7,7,8)	30 (6,9,8,7)	59	121	Waltz	Mistral gagnant - Renaud	Safe
Emmanuel & Fauve	32 (9,8,9,6)	27 (8,7,7,5)	59	116	Rumba	Caruso - Amaury Vassili	Bottom 2
Emmanuel & Fauve	34 (9,8,9,8)	23 (8,4,7,4)	57	116	Jive	Ça (C'est Vraiment Toi) - Téléphone	Bottom 2
Gérard & Silvia	20 (5,5,6,4)	18 (5,5,5,3)	38	90	Quickstep	Walk Like An Egyptian - The Bangles	Safe
Gérard & Silvia	32 (8,9,8,7)	20 (6,4,6,4)	52	90	Waltz	Comme des Enfants - Cœur de pirate	Safe
Estelle & Maxime	29 (8,8,7,6)	27 (7,7,7,6)	56	109	Waltz	L'Envie - Johnny Hallyday	Safe
Estelle & Maxime	28 (7,7,8,6)	25 (7,7,6,5)	53	109	Cha-Cha-Cha	Crazy in Love - Beyoncé ft. Jay-Z	Safe
Amel & Christophe	29 (9,5,9,6)	30 (9,5,8,8)	59	131	Samba	Samba de Janeiro - Bellini	Safe
Amel & Christophe	37 (10,9,9,9)	35 (9,8,9,9)	72	131	Tango	Like a Prayer - Madonna	Safe
Taïg & Denitsa	33 (9,8,8,8)	29 (8,7,7,7)	62	123	Jive	Call Me - Blondie	Safe
Taïg & Denitsa	31 (8,7,8,8)	30 (8,7,7,8)	61	123	Foxtrot	Paradise - Coldplay	Safe
Dance Duel
Emmanuel & Fauve	80%				Cha-Cha-Cha	I Gotta Feeling - The Black Eyed Peas	Safe
Estelle & Maxime	20%				Cha-Cha-Cha	I Gotta Feeling - The Black Eyed Peas	Eliminated

=== Week 7: Trio challenge ===
Individual judges scores in the chart below (given in parentheses) are listed in this order from left to right:: Marie-Claude Pietragalla, Jean-Marc Généreux, Shy'm, Chris Marques.

Running order

Couple	Results				Style	Music	Result
Couple	Artistic	Technical	Total		Style	Music	Result
Lorie & Christian	35 (9,9,9,8)	35 (9,9,9,8)	70	143	Paso Doble	Envole-moi - Jean-Jacques Goldman	Safe
Lorie & Christian	37 (9,10,9,9)	36 (9,9,9,9)	73	143	Rumba (in trio with Grégoire Lyonnet)	Set Fire To The Rain - Adele	Safe
Emmanuel & Fauve	36 (9,9,9,9)	29 (8,8,8,5)	65	129	American Smooth	Who Wants To Live Forever - Queen	Safe
Emmanuel & Fauve	35 (9,8,9,9)	29 (9,5,8,7)	64	129	Tango (in trio with Candice Pascal)	Mourir demain - Natasha St-Pier and Pascal Obispo	Safe
Gérard & Silvia	31 (8,8,8,7)	29 (8,7,7,7)	60	102	Rumba	Love Actually Theme - Craig Armstrong	Eliminated
Gérard & Silvia	23 (6,6,6,5)	19 (6,4,5,4)	42	102	Foxtrot (in trio with Coralie Licata)	Double je - Christophe Willem	Eliminated
Taïg & Denitsa	25 (7,6,7,5)	22 (6,5,6,5)	47	96	Paso Doble	Theme from Mission: Impossible - Lalo Schifrin	Bottom 2
Taïg & Denitsa	27 (7,7,7,6)	22 (6,5,6,5)	49	96	Quickstep (in trio with Katrina Patchett)	We No Speak Americano - Yolanda Be Cool	Bottom 2
Amel & Christophe	38 (10,9,10,9)	34 (9,7,9,9)	72	133	Foxtrot	Non, je ne regrette rien - Édith Piaf	Safe
Amel & Christophe	33 (9,8,8,8)	28 (9,5,7,7)	61	133	Jive (in trio with Julien Brugel)	Holding Out for a Hero - Bonnie Tyler	Safe
Dance Duel
Taïg & Denitsa	50.3%				Cha-Cha-Cha	Tacata' - Tacabro	Safe
Gérard & Silvia	49.7%				Cha-Cha-Cha	Tacata' - Tacabro	Eliminated

=== Week 8: Semi-finals ===
Individual judges scores in the chart below (given in parentheses) are listed in this order from left to right:: Marie-Claude Pietragalla, Jean-Marc Généreux, Shy'm, Chris Marques.

Running order

Couple	Results				Style	Music	Result
Couple	Artistic	Technical	Total		Style	Music	Result
Lorie & Christian	34 (8,8,9,9)	28 (7,6,8,7)	62	134	American Smooth	Si seulement je pouvais lui manquer - Calogero	Eliminated
Lorie & Christian	37 (9,10,9,9)	35 (8,9,9,9)	72	134	Samba	Vogue - Madonna	Eliminated
Emmanuel & Fauve	34 (8,8,9,9)	33 (8,8,9,8)	67	136	Paso Doble	Sunday Bloody Sunday - U2	Safe
Emmanuel & Fauve	36 (9,8,10,9)	33 (9,8,8,8)	69	136	Rumba	Lucie - Pascal Obispo	Safe
Taïg & Denitsa	33 (9,8,8,8)	28 (8,7,7,6)	61	125	Salsa	Waka Waka (This Time for Africa) — Shakira	Bottom 2
Taïg & Denitsa	32 (9,7,8,8)	32 (8,7,8,9)	64	125	Waltz	When a Man Loves a Woman — Percy Sledge	Bottom 2
Amel & Christophe	37 (10,9,9,9)	36 (9,9,9,9)	73	140	Rumba	Je Te Promets — Johnny Hallyday	Safe
Amel & Christophe	37 (9,10,9,9)	30 (9,7,7,7)	67	140	Cha-Cha-Cha	Hush Hush — The Pussycat Dolls	Safe
Megamix
Lorie & Christian	Winners (10 bonus points) (chosen by Jean-Marc Généreux, Shy'm and Chris Marques)			144	Waltz + Paso Doble + Samba	If I Ain't Got You — Alicia Keys + Highway to Hell — AC/DC + ABC — The Jackson 5	
Taïg & Denitsa	Losers(chosen by Marie-Claude Pietragalla)			125	Waltz + Paso Doble + Samba	If I Ain't Got You — Alicia Keys + Highway to Hell — AC/DC + ABC — The Jackson 5	
Emmanuel & Fauve	Losers (chosen by Shy'm and Chris Marques)			136	Tango + Cha-Cha-Cha + Jive	Rue de la Paix — Zazie + Telephone — Lady Gaga & Beyoncé + Proud Mary — Ike & Tina Turner	
Amel & Christophe	Winners (10 bonus points) (chosen by Marie-Claude Pietragalla and Jean-Marc Généreux)			150	Tango + Cha-Cha-Cha + Jive	Rue de la Paix — Zazie + Telephone — Lady Gaga & Beyoncé + Proud Mary — Ike & Tina Turner	
Dance Duel
Taïg & Denitsa	54%				Cha-Cha-Cha	Stand on the Word - Keedz	Safe
Lorie & Christian	46%				Cha-Cha-Cha	Stand on the Word - Keedz	Eliminated

=== Week 9: Final ===
Individual judges scores in the chart below (given in parentheses) are listed in this order from left to right:: Marie-Claude Pietragalla, Jean-Marc Généreux, Shy'm, Chris Marques.

Running order

Couple	Results				Style	Music	Result
Couple	Artistic	Technical	Total		Style	Music	Result
Amel & Christophe	38 (10,10,9,9)	36 (9,9,9,9)	74	154	Jive	Don't Stop Me Now - Queen	2nd Place
Amel & Christophe	40 (10,10,10,10)	40 (10,10,10,10)	80	154	Rumba	Ma révérence - Véronique Sanson	2nd Place
Taïg & Denitsa	37 (10,9,9,9)	33 (9,8,8,8)	70	141	Foxtrot	Je l'aime à mourir - Shakira	3rd Place
Taïg & Denitsa	36 (9,9,9,9)	35 (9,9,9,8)	71	141	Paso Doble	Bring Me to Life - Evanescence	3rd Place
Emmanuel & Fauve	38 (10,9,10,9)	37 (10,9,9,9)	75	149	Tango	Roméo et Juliette - Sergueï Prokofiev	Winner
Emmanuel & Fauve	40 (10,10,10,10)	34 (9,9,9,7)	74	149	Rumba	Your Song - Ewan McGregor	Winner
Last Dance
Emmanuel & Fauve	57%				Freestyle	Et maintenant - Johnny Hallyday	
Amel & Christophe	43%				Freestyle	Memory - Barbra Streisand	

== Call-Out Order ==
The Table Lists in which order the contestants' fates were revealed by Quétier and Cerutti.

Contestant call-out order
Order	2	3	4	5	6	7	8	9
1	Amel & Christophe; 21%	Amel & Christophe; 35%	Lorie & Christian; 31%	Emmanuel & Fauve; 47%	Amel & Christophe; 35%	Lorie & Christian; 40%	Emmanuel & Fauve; 59%	Emmanuel & Fauve; 53%
2	Emmanuel & Fauve; 15%	Lorie & Christian; 15%	Taïg & Denitsa; 18%	Amel & Christophe; 14%	Taïg & Denitsa; 27%	Amel & Christophe; 22%	Amel & Christophe; 18%	Amel & Christophe; 29%
3	Bastian & Katrina; 13%	Gérard & Silvia; 12%	Amel & Christophe; 14%	Estelle & Maxime; 12%	Lorie & Christian; 15%	Emmanuel & Fauve; 15%	Taïg & Denitsa; 13%	Taïg & Denitsa; 18%
4	Lorie & Christian; 11%	Emmanuel & Fauve; 10%	Emmanuel & Fauve; 11%	Lorie & Christian; 10%	Gérard & Silvia; 12%	Taïg & Denitsa; 13%	Lorie & Christian; 10%	
5	Gérard & Silvia; 10%	Bastian & Katrina; 8%	Bastian & Katrina; 11%	Gérard & Silvia; 7%	Emmanuel & Fauve; 8%	Gérard & Silvia; 10%		
6	Chimène & Julien; 8%	Estelle & Maxime; 6%	Gérard & Silvia; 8%	Taïg & Denitsa; 6%	Estelle & Maxime; 3%			
7	Estelle & Maxime; 7%	Chimène & Julien; 6%	Estelle & Maxime; 6%	Bastian & Katrina; 4%				
8	Laura & Grégoire; 6%	Taïg & Denitsa; 5%	Chimène & Julien; 1%					
9	Taïg & Denitsa; 5%	Laura & Grégoire; 3%						
10	Christophe & Candice; 4%							

This couple came in first place with the judges.
This couple came in last place with the judges.
This couple came in last place with the judges and was eliminated.
This couple was eliminated.
This couple won the competition.
This couple came in second in the competition.
This couple came in third in the competition.

== Dance Chart ==
The celebrities and professional partners danced one of these routines for each corresponding week.

- Week 1 : Cha-Cha-Cha, Tango or Quickstep
- Week 2 : Foxtrot, Jive, Pasodoble, Samba or Waltz (Personal Story week)
- Week 3 : Cha-cha-cha, Foxtrot, Jive, Pasodoble, Rumba or Tango (80s week)
- Week 4 : Foxtrot, Pasodoble, Rumba or Tango (Symphony Orchestra week)
- Week 5 : American Smooth, Cha-cha-cha, Pasodoble, Rumba, Salsa, Tango or Waltz (Cinema week)
- Week 6 : Cha-cha-cha, Foxtrot, Jive, Quickstep, Rumba, Samba, Tango or Waltz (15 Second Solo week)
- Week 7 : American Smooth, Foxtrot, Jive, Pasodoble, Quickstep, Rumba or Tango (Trio challenge week)
- Week 8 : American Smooth, Cha-cha-cha, Pasodoble, Rumba, Salsa, Samba or Waltz (Semi finals)
- Week 9 : Foxtrot, Freestyle, Jive, Pasodoble, Rumba or Tango (Final)

Couple	1	2	3		4		5		6	7	8		9	
Emmanuel & Fauve	Quickstep	Foxtrot	Cha-Cha-Cha	Team Paso Doble	Paso Doble	Samba Relay	Waltz	Cha-Cha-Cha Marathon	Rumba	American Smooth	Paso Doble	Tango, Cha-Cha-Cha & Jive Megamix	Tango	Freestyle
Emmanuel & Fauve	Quickstep	Foxtrot	Cha-Cha-Cha	Team Paso Doble	Paso Doble	Samba Relay	Waltz	Cha-Cha-Cha Marathon	Jive	Tango	Rumba	Tango, Cha-Cha-Cha & Jive Megamix	Rumba	Freestyle
Amel & Christophe	Quickstep	Waltz	Jive	Team Paso Doble	Paso Doble	Samba Relay	American Smooth	Cha-Cha-Cha Marathon	Samba	Foxtrot	Rumba	Tango, Cha-Cha-Cha & Jive Megamix	Jive	Freestyle
Amel & Christophe	Quickstep	Waltz	Jive	Team Paso Doble	Paso Doble	Samba Relay	American Smooth	Cha-Cha-Cha Marathon	Tango	Jive	Cha-Cha-Cha	Tango, Cha-Cha-Cha & Jive Megamix	Rumba	Freestyle
Taïg & Denitsa	Cha-Cha-Cha	Samba	Tango	Team Tango	Paso Doble	Samba Relay	Rumba	Cha-Cha-Cha Marathon	Jive	Paso Doble	Salsa	Waltz, Paso Doble & Samba Megamix	Foxtrot	
Taïg & Denitsa	Cha-Cha-Cha	Samba	Tango	Team Tango	Paso Doble	Samba Relay	Rumba	Cha-Cha-Cha Marathon	Foxtrot	Quickstep	Waltz	Waltz, Paso Doble & Samba Megamix	Pasodoble	
Lorie & Christian	Quickstep	Paso Doble	Foxtrot	Team Tango	Rumba	Samba Relay	Cha-Cha-Cha	Cha-Cha-Cha Marathon	Jive	Paso Doble	American Smooth	Waltz, Paso Doble & Samba Megamix		
Lorie & Christian	Quickstep	Paso Doble	Foxtrot	Team Tango	Rumba	Samba Relay	Cha-Cha-Cha	Cha-Cha-Cha Marathon	Waltz	Rumba	Samba	Waltz, Paso Doble & Samba Megamix		
Gérard & Silvia	Cha-Cha-Cha	Jive	Paso Doble	Team Tango	Foxtrot	Samba Relay	Tango	Cha-Cha-Cha Marathon	Quickstep	Rumba				
Gérard & Silvia	Cha-Cha-Cha	Jive	Paso Doble	Team Tango	Foxtrot	Samba Relay	Tango	Cha-Cha-Cha Marathon	Waltz	Foxtrot				
Estelle & Maxime	Tango	Samba	Rumba	Team Paso Doble	Paso Doble	Samba Relay	Salsa	Cha-Cha-Cha Marathon	Waltz					
Estelle & Maxime	Tango	Samba	Rumba	Team Paso Doble	Paso Doble	Samba Relay	Salsa	Cha-Cha-Cha Marathon	Cha-Cha-Cha					
Bastian & Katrina	Tango	Waltz	Jive	Team Tango	Rumba	Samba Relay	Paso Doble	Cha Cha Cha Marathon						
Chimène & Julien	Cha-Cha-Cha	Jive	Rumba	Team Paso Doble	Tango	Samba Relay								
Laura & Grégoire	Cha-Cha-Cha	Paso Doble	Tango	Team Tango										
Christophe & Candice	Tango	Foxtrot												

Highest scoring dance
Lowest scoring dance
Danced, but not scored

== Musical Guests ==
Date	Performers	Tracks Performed	Dancers
October 20, 2012	Jeanne Mas	En rouge et noir	Team Tango (Lorie & Christian, Laura & Grégoire, Gérard & Silvia, Taïg & Denitsa, Bastian & Katrina)
October 20, 2012	M. Pokora & Tal	Envole-moi	Professional Dancers (Julien Brugel, Christophe Licata, Candice Pascal & Denitsa Ikonomova)
October 27, 2012	Louis Delort & Camille Lou	Tomber dans ses yeux	Professional Dancers
November 3, 2012	One Direction	Live While We're Young	Professional Dancers
November 17, 2012	Patrick Bruel	Lequel de Nous	Professional Dancers
November 24, 2012	Shy'm	Et Alors! On se fout de nous	Professional Dancers

== France television ratings ==
Show	Episode	Air date	Viewers (millions)	Rating/share Viewers over 4	Rating/share Housewives under 50	Weekly Viewer rank	Note
1	"Top 10 Perform (Week 1)"	October 6, 2012	5.86	28.6%	37.8%	1	
1	"After Show (Week 1)"	October 6, 2012	3.24	27.7%	35%	1	
2	"Top 10 Perform (Week 2)"	October 13, 2012	5.939	29%	36%	1	
2	"After Show (Week 2)"	October 13, 2012	3.2	27.1%	33%	1	
3	"Top 9 Perform"	October 20, 2012	5.643	27.9%	34%	1	
3	"After Show (Week 3)"	October 20, 2012	3.2	28%	31%	1	
4	"Top 8 Perform"	October 27, 2012	5.208	23.4%	30%	1	
4	"After Show (Week 4)"	October 27, 2012	3.1	22.6%	27%	1	
5	"Top 7 Perform"	November 3, 2012	5.47	26.1%	31%	1	
5	"After Show (Week 5)"	November 3, 2012	3.2	25.8%	29%	1	
6	"Top 6 Perform"	November 10, 2012	5.645	25.8%	31%	1	
6	"After Show (Week 6)"	November 10, 2012	3.5	27.2%	31%	1	
7	"Top 5 Perform"	November 17, 2012	5.58	26%	34%	1	
7	"After Show (Week 7)"	November 17, 2012	3.2	26.6%	34%	1	
8	"Semi finals"	November 24, 2012	N/A	N/A	N/A	N/A	N/A
8	"After Show (Week 8)"	November 24, 2012	N/A	N/A	N/A	N/A	N/A

== Around the Show ==
A notable contestant for the season was then 30-year-old Lorie, a singer wildly popular in the early 2000s that TF1 has tried to get on the previous two seasons but who had previously declined because she felt that as an accomplished dancer, her participation would be unfair to the other contestants. However, with her sixth album Regarde-Moi proving to be a huge commercial failure and causing her to split from her label, she evidently changed her mind and even timed the release of her next album Danse with the show. The strategy was unsuccessful as Danse sold even less copies than Regarde-Moi, forcing Lorie to cancel her planned 2013 concert tour.

People who are known to have been in negotiations for a spot include actor Laurent Ournac, as well as singers Alizée, who claimed in interview to be excited at the prospect, and Eve Angeli, who broke negotiations as she didn't want to be on the same season as Lorie.
