= Équilibre =

Équilibre, L'Équilibre or En équilibre may refer to:

- L'Équilibre (Emmanuel Moire album)
- L'Équilibre (Kyo album)
  - "L'Équilibre", song by Kyo from L'Équilibre
- En équilibre, 2015 film by Denis Dercourt
- L'Équilibre instable, 2007 album by Stanislas
- En équilibre, 2014 album by Suarez (band)
