= L'Or de nos vies =

Single by Fight Aids
- Released: 28 July 2006
- Recorded: 2006
- Genre: Pop
- Length: 3:33
- Label: Jive Epic Group
- Songwriters: Benoît Poher; Kyo
- Producers: François Delabrière; Kyo

Music video
- Fighting Aids - "L'Or de nos vies" on YouTube

"L'Or de nos vies" is a 2006 charity single written by French rock band Kyo and its lead singer Benoît Poher and produced by Kyo and François Delabrière. The song was interpreted by a French music collective called Fight Aids.

== Charity ==
The revenues from the sale of the single and downloads was donated to F.A.M. (Fight Aids Monaco) charity, in support of building a house called "maison de vie" (house of life) near Avignon.

== Music video and documentary ==
The music video was shot on 20 June 2006 on Charles Floquet Avenue in Paris, very near Eiffel Tower, in presence of all the artists and 300 other participants. The video shows a very small group of people (representing people with AIDS and their sympathizers) deciding to walk in defiance against the current of one-way pedestrians (representing indifference in society). But little by little, pedestrians decide to join in those defiant few and eventually all are walking in the direction of the AIDS activists in a march of unity and solidarity.

Documentary (making of)

NRJ 12 also broadcast on 15 August 2006, a 24-minute documentary about "making of" of the music video and interviews with participating artists.

== Participating artists ==
A great number of artists took part (listed in alphabetical order):

- Anggun
- Bénabar
- Amel Bent
- Patrick Bruel
- Corneille
- Emma Daumas
- Jenifer
- Kyo
- Leslie
- Emmanuel Moire
- M. Pokora
- Roch Voisine
- Stéphanie de Monaco
- Tété

== Charts ==
The song released on 28 July 2006 received wide media coverage and reached number 5 in SNEP, the French singles chart.

Chart (2012)	Peak position
Ultratip Belgian Singles Chart (Wallonia)	14 (Ultratip)
SNEP French Singles Chart	5
Hitparade Swiss Singles Chart	43
