= 300 Lésions =

Studio album by Kyo
- Released: December 28, 2004
- Recorded: France, 2003
- Genres: Pop; rock
- Length: 38:58
- Labels: Jive; BMG

Kyo chronology
Le Chemin (2003)	300 Lésions (2004)	Best of (2007)

Singles from 300 Lésions
- 1. "Contact" Released: January 2005; 2. "Sarah" Released: May 2005

300 Lésions is a 2004 album recorded by French pop-rock act Kyo. It was released on December 28, 2004, and achieved huge success in France, Belgium (Wallonia) and Switzerland, where it was respectively #1, #1 and #2. This album, entirely composed by the band, is its third album overall and remains to date its second most successful one. It provided two singles : "Contact" (#8 in France, #11 in Belgium, #37 in Switzerland) and "Sarah" (#33 in France, #31 in Belgium, #65 in Switzerland).The single "Contact" is featured on the videogame FIFA 06.

The lyrics, mainly written by Benoît Poher, are more gloomy than on band's previous albums (e.g. "Ce soir" ou "L'Enfer"), with much of the music stripping back the pop elements and leaning more into the band's alternative rock influences, which would later be further expanded on in Poher and Florian's project Empyr. Florian Dubos performs three songs : "Révolution", "Je te rêve encore" and "L'Assaut des regards".

== Track listing ==
No.	Title	Length
1.	"Contact"	3:39
2.	"Dans ma chair"	3:22
3.	"Qui je suis"	3:45
4.	"Sarah"	2:50
5.	"Sad Day"	3:30
6.	"Revolutions"	3:09
7.	"Omega" (interlude)	0:53
8.	"Ce soir"	4:11
9.	"Respire"	3:15
10.	"Je te rêve encore"	3:17
11.	"L'Enfer"	3:31
12.	"L'Assaut des regards"	5:26

Source : Allmusic.

== Personnel ==
- Benoît Poher – vocals
- Florian Dubos – guitar, backing vocals
- Nicolas Chassagne – guitar
- Fabien Dubos – drums

== Releases ==
Date	Label	Country	Format	Catalog
2004	BMG / Jive	Belgium, France, Switzerland	CD	66343724
2005	BMG / Jive	Belgium, France, Switzerland	CD	82876690952
2005	BMG / Jive	Belgium, France, Switzerland	CD	34372
2007	BMG / Jive	Belgium, France, Switzerland	CD	70789127

== Certifications and sales ==
Country	Certification	Date	Sales certified	Physical sales
France	Platinum	June 29, 2005	300,000	463,300
Switzerland	Gold	2005	20,000	

== Charts ==
Chart (2004–2005)	Peak position
Belgian (Wallonia) Albums Chart	1
French SNEP Albums Chart	1
Swiss Albums Chart	2

End of year chart (2004)	Position
French Albums Chart	97
End of year chart (2005)	Position
Belgian (Wallonia) Albums Chart	11
French Albums Chart	11
Swiss Albums Chart	72
