= Kyo (band) =

French pop rock band

Background information
- Origin: Yvelines, Île-de-France, France
- Genres: Rock; pop rock; alternative rock
- Years active: 1997–2005; 2013–present
- Label: Sony
- Members: Benoît Poher; Florian Dubois; Fabien Dubois; Nicolas Chassagne
- Website: www.kyomusic.com

Kyo is a French rock band with lead vocals by Benoît Poher. The band was first active from 1997 to 2005 with three albums Kyo (2000), Le Chemin (2003) and 300 Lésions (2004) and a string of singles. It announced a hiatus in 2005 without a definite break-up. In 2006, Kyo was involved in launching "L'Or de nos vies" written by Kyo and its lead singer Benoît Poher for the Fighting AIDS charity in 2006. Kyo launched a comeback in 2013 with the album L'équilibre and remains active.

== Biography ==
Since attending collège Notre-Dame in Yvelines, the two brothers, Fabien and Florian Dubos, and two friends Nicolas Chassagne and Benoît Poher, discovered they had the same passion for bands such as Nirvana, Pearl Jam, Rage Against the Machine and Soundgarden.

At that time the band was named Spiritus Sanctus and they recorded their first demo on DAT with Dominique Gire.

In 1997, they met their future manager Yves Michel Akle, who convinced of their potential, introduced them to Sony BMG where they performed and were offered a contract. Their big break came when they performed during a big concert of David Hallyday, son of famous French rocker Johnny Hallyday, also appearing in the music video of one of David Hallyday's music videos as a backing band.

They have since released three albums and one DVD entitled Kyosphere. After limited success of self-titled debut album Kyo that sold around 40,000 copies, their sophomore album Le Chemin sold in comparison 1.5 million copies, and peaked at number 2 on the French Albums Chart. They retreated to a house in Brittany, where they worked on their new album 300 Lésions. That album went gold in four days with sales reaching upwards of 500,000 copies, and peaked at number 1 on the French Albums Chart.

In 2005, the band announced a hiatus, but without a definite break.

Fight Aids charity single

The band would be instrumental in launching Fight Aids single "L'Or de nos vies", co-written by Kyo and their lead singer Benoît "Ben" Poher and produced by François Delabrière and Kyo. Seventeen artists pitched in including Anggun, Bénabar, Amel Bent, Patrick Bruel, Corneille, Emma Daumas, Jenifer, Kyo, Leslie, Emmanuel Moire, M. Pokora, Roch Voisine, Stéphanie de Monaco, Tété. The revenues from the sale of the single and downloads was donated to F.A.M. (Fight Aids Monaco) charity, in support of building a house called "maison de vie" (house of life) near Avignon which offers both psychological and material aid to persons living with either HIV and AIDS and their families. The song released on 28 July 2006 received wide media coverage and reached number 5 in SNEP, the French singles chart. NRJ 12 also broadcast on 15 August 2006, a 24-minute documentary about "making of" of the music video and interviews with participating artists.

Comeback (2013–2014)

In June 2013, it was revealed that Kyo was planning a comeback and were in the process of recording material at Gang Studio with producer Mark Plati. The singles "Le Graal" and "L'équilibre", from the upcoming album, were pre-released at the end of January 2014.

2017

In October 2017, Kyo launch a new single "Ton Mec" and announce a new album "Dans la Peau", for December 2017.

== In popular culture ==
- The song "Le Chemin" was used as the ending of the second episode of the anime OVA Strait Jacket.
- The song "Contact" from 300 Lésions was used in the soundtrack for the video game FIFA 06.

== Members ==
- Benoît Poher - Lead vocals
  - Benoît "Ben" Poher born June 27, 1979, in Yvelines (in the Paris area), France is a singer, songwriter and lyricist who continued in the French rock band Empyr alongside Florian Dubos, another member of Kyo. He has also co-written for a number of artists including Johnny Hallyday, Jenifer, as well as a number of musical comedies and television series.
- Fabien Dubos - Drums
  - Fabien "Fab" Dubos born 3 June 1978 is the older brother of bassist of band Florian> He was a massive fan of Japanese manga. He named the band after character Kyo Kusanagi in SNK Playmore's The King of Fighters video game series. With a hiatus of the band, he joined as singer, guitarist and drummer for the French rock and rap formation Crew Z.
- Florian Dubos - Guitar / Backing Vocals / Bass
  - Florian "Flo" Dubos born 26 March 1980 and younger brother of Fabien Dubos. Also joined Benoît Poher in Empyr as bass player
- Nicolas Chassagne - Guitar
  - Nicolas "Nico" Chassagne born on 24 December 1978
- Jocelyn Moze - Drums

Joined in 2018 after Fabien Dubos left the band

== Awards ==
- NRJ Music Awards
  - Best French Song (2004)
  - Best French Album (2004)
  - Best French Band (2004)
  - Best Musical Site (2004)
- Victoires de la musique
  - Best Group Revelation of the Year (2004)
  - Best Group Revelation Shows of the Year (2004)
  - Best Album Revelation of the Year (2004)
- MTV Europe Music Awards
  - French Band of the Year (2003)
  - Best French Artists (2005)
- World Music Awards
  - World's Best Selling French Artist (2004)
- Prix Roger Seiller of Sacem
  - Best French band (2004)

== Discography ==
=== Albums ===
Studio albums

Year	Album	Peak positions				Certification
Year	Album	FRA	BEL (Fl)	BEL (Wa)	SWI	Certification
2000	Kyo	–	–	–	–	
2003	Le Chemin	2	–	1	10	
2004	Kyo (rerelease)	71	–	75	–	
2004	300 Lésions	1	–	1	2	
2014	L'Équilibre	2	99	3	20	
2017	Dans la peau	29	–	19	58	
2021	La part des lions	–	–	10	–	

Compilation albums

Year	Album	Peak positions			Certification
Year	Album	FRA	BEL (Wa)	SWI	Certification
2007	Best Of	–	38	–	

=== Singles ===
Year	Album	Peak positions				Album
Year	Album	FRA	BEL (Wa)	NED	SWI	Album
2000	"Il est temps"	–	–	–	–	
2000	"Je n'veux pas oublier"	–	–	–	–	
2003	"Le Chemin" (feat. Sita)	12	4	60	14	Le Chemin
2003	"Dernière danse"	6	4	–	14	Le Chemin
2003	"Je cours"	20	8	–	41	Le Chemin
2004	"Je saigne encore" (2 versions)	13	12	–	39	Le Chemin
2005	"Contact"	8	11	–	37	300 Lésions
2005	"Sarah"	33	31	–	65	300 Lésions
2014	"Le Graal"	11	17	–	–	L'équilibre
2014	"L'équilibre"	44	52*	–	–	L'équilibre
2017	"Ton mec"	34	34	–	–	
2017	"Plan A"	162	–	–	–	
2021	"Mon époque"	–	28	–	–	
2022	"Stand Up"	–	42	–	–	

*Did not appear in the official Belgian Ultratop 50 charts, but rather in the bubbling under Ultratip charts. Added 50 positions to actual Ultratip position at #2 in Belgium

Collective single by Fight AIDS

Year	Single	Peak positions			Note
Year	Single	FRA	BEL (Wa)	SWI	Note
2006	"L'Or de nos vies" (Fight Aids)	5	64* (Ultratip)	43	Written by Benoît Poher and Kyo; Produced by François Delabrière and Kyo; Vocals by Anggun, Bénabar, Amel Bent, Patrick Bruel, Corneille, Emma Daumas, Jenifer, Kyo, Leslie, Emmanuel Moire, M. Pokora, Roch Voisine, Stéphanie de Monaco, Tété

*Did not appear in the official Belgian Ultratop 50 charts, but rather in the bubbling under Ultratip charts.nAdded 50 positions to actual Ultratip position at #14 in Belgium

== DVDs ==
- 2004: Kyosphère

== Filmography ==
- 2004: Kyosphère
- 2005: Sad Day
