= (Là) Où je pars =

(Là) où je pars

Studio album by Emmanuel Moire
- Released: 13 November 2006
- Recorded: France
- Genre: Pop
- Label: Warner Music France

Emmanuel Moire chronology
| (Là) où je pars (2007) | L'Équilibre (2009) |

(Là) Où je pars (French pronunciation: [la u ʒə paʁ], "There, where I start") is the first solo album recorded by French singer Emmanuel Moire. It was first released on 13 November 2006, then on 21 May 2007 in its second version. Four tracks from the album were released as singles – "Le Sourire", "Ça me fait du bien", "Là où je pars" and "Si c'était ça la vie", but they were only available digitally and on airplay (except "Le Sourire", which was released as CD single and peak at number seven in France). The album achieved some success : it debuted at a peak of number eight on the French albums chart and totaled 70 weeks in the top 200. In Belgium (Wallonia), it started at number 71 on 25 November 2006 and reached number 34 seven weeks later, and fell off the top 100 after 18 weeks. The album passed almost unnoticed in Switzerland where it was ranked low for a sole week.

== Track listing ==
1. "Celui que j'étais" (Lionel Florence, Emmanuel Moire) – 3:50
2. "Le Sourire" (Guillon, Benoît Poher) – 3:56
3. "Je vis deux fois" (Beucher, Guillon, Moire) – 3:29
4. "Là où je pars" (Davide Esposito, Guillon) – 4:34
5. "Ça me fait du bien" (Cowell) – 3:33
6. "Rien ni personne" (Guillon, Janois, Rousseau) – 3:49
7. "La femme qu'il me faut" (Beucher, D'Aimé, Moire) – 3:32
8. "La Fin" (Cosso-Merad, Moire) – 4:21
9. "Si c'était ça la vie" (D'Aimé, Moire) – 4:01
10. "Plus que jamais" (D'Aimé, Janois, Rousseau) – 4:08
11. "Merci" (Guillon, Joseph) – 4:03
12. "Le Sourire" (acoustic) (Guillon, Benoît Poher) – 4:00
13. "Si c'était ça la vie" (acoustic) (D'Aimé, Moire) – 4:27

== Personnel ==
Recording

- Simon Hale – arranger
- Charles Mendiant – engineer, mixing, sound assistant
- Pete Schwier – mixing
- Raphaël Jonin – mastering
- Matthew Vaughan – programming

Musicians

- Emmanuel Andre – violin
- Emmanuel Moire – piano, author, vocals
- Jean-Philippe Audin – cello
- David Braccini – violin
- Christophe Briquet – alto
- Johan Dalgaard – piano, keyboards
- Nicolas Fiszman – bass
- Maxine Garoute – percussion, drums
- Christophe Guiot – violin
- Pierre Jaconelli – guitar
- Jean Philippe Kuzma – violin
- Alain Lanty – piano
- Philippe Nadal – cello
- Daniel Vagner – alto

== Charts ==
=== Weekly charts ===
| Chart (2006–2007) | Peak position |
|---|---|
| Belgian Albums (Ultratop Wallonia) | 34 |
| French Albums (SNEP) | 8 |
| Swiss Albums (Schweizer Hitparade) | 94 |

=== Year-end charts ===
| Chart (2006) | Position |
|---|---|
| French Albums (SNEP) | 100 |
| Chart (2007) | Position |
| French Albums (SNEP) | 94 |

== Certifications ==
| Country | Certification | Date | Sales certified |
|---|---|---|---|
| France | Gold | 15 December 2006 | 75,000 |
