= Chemin de fer =

Chemin de fer is a French phrase meaning "railway" or "railroad"; literally, "iron path".

Chemin de fer may refer to:

== Arts, entertainment, and media ==
=== Literature ===
- Chemin de Fer, a play by Georges Feydeau (1862–1921)
- "Chemin de Fer", a poem by Elizabeth Bishop (1911–1979) from North and South

=== Music ===
- Étude aux chemins de fer, a 1948 composition by Pierre Schaeffer constructed from railway sounds
- Le Chemin de fer (Alkan), Op. 27, an 1844 étude composed by Charles-Valentin Alkan

=== Other uses in arts, entertainment, and media ===
- Chemin-de-fer, the original version of the card game baccarat when it was introduced to France
- The Railway (French: Le Chemin de fer), an 1873 painting by French artist Édouard Manet

== See also ==
- Chemin (disambiguation)
- Le chemin (disambiguation)
