= Dernière danse (Kyo song) =

Single by Kyo

from the album Le Chemin
- Released: 2003
- Recorded: 2002
- Label: BMG Records
- Songwriter(s): Kyo
- Producer(s): François Delabrière; Kyo

Kyo singles chronology
"Le Chemin" (2002)	"Dernière danse" (2003)	"Je cours" (2003)

Music video
- "Dernière danse" on YouTube

"Dernière danse" ('Last dance') is a 2003 song by the French pop rock band Kyo from the album Le Chemin. It charted in France, Switzerland and Belgium's French charts.

== Adaptations ==
The song was adapted later by the French punk rock band Zephyr 21 on their album Album de reprises Volume 1 using an instrumental version of a song by Sum 41.

== Charts ==
=== Weekly charts ===
Chart (2002–2003)	Peak position
Belgium (Ultratop 50 Wallonia)	4
France (SNEP)	6
Switzerland (Schweizer Hitparade)	14

=== Year-end charts ===
Chart (2003)	Position
Belgium (Ultratop Wallonia)	21
Switzerland (Schweizer Hitparade)	87
