= Empyr =

French rock band

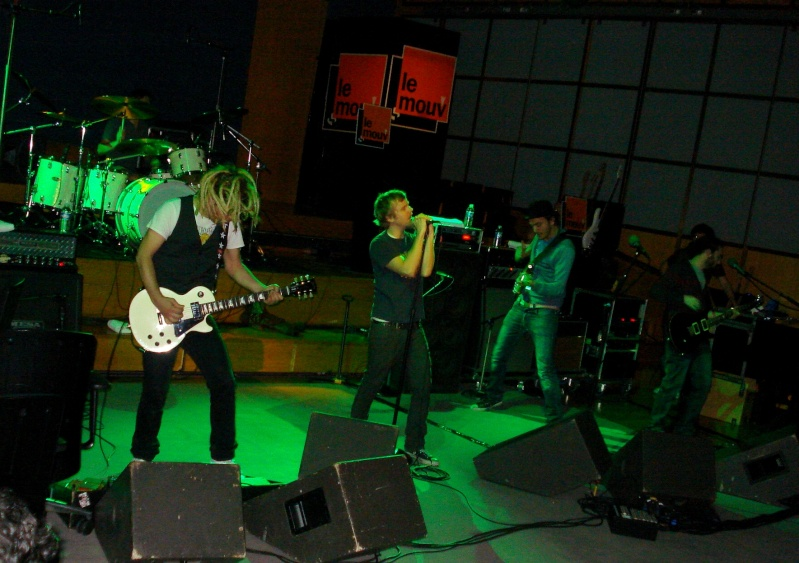

Background information
- Origin: France
- Genres: Alternative rock; alternative metal; pop rock; melodic hardcore
- Years active: 2007–2012
- Labels: Jive France; Sony BMG
- Members: Benoît Poher; Florian Dubos; Frédéric Duquesne; Benoît Julliard; Jocelyn Moze

Empyr is a French English-language rock band established in 2007 and made up of five members of four different French bands, Kyo, Pleymo, Watcha, and Vegastar.

== History ==
In 2008, the band released its debut album The Peaceful Riot that was recorded in Los Angeles and produced by Ken Andrews. The album, which combined elements of Kyo's pop rock with the other members' alternative metal backgrounds, was relatively successful reaching number 17 in France and number 20 in Belgian French charts. It also charted in Switzerland. The single "New Day" also got radio time. The band has also released a follow-up EP Your Skin, My Skin in 2009, and the album Unicorn in 2011, moving further into the pop rock sound of Kyo on the latter release. The band has been inactive since 2012, with Poher and Dubos returning to Kyo, while Julliard would eventually rejoin Pleymo, and Duquesne would join industrial metal group Mass Hysteria.

== Members ==
- Benoît Poher of French band Kyo – lead singer
- Florian Dubos of French band Kyo – guitar – backing vocals
- Frédéric Duquesne of French band Watcha – guitar
- Benoît Julliard of French band Pleymo – bass, backing vocals
- Jocelyn Moze of French band Vegastar – drums

== In popular culture ==
- In 2010, the track "It's Gonna Be" from the album Unicorn was used for the trailer of an episode in season 7 of CSI : New York.
- In 2011, the same track "It's Gonna Be" was used for international launching of iPhone 4S on Apple website alongside Adele's "Rolling in the Deep"
- In 2011, the track "Give Me More" again from Unicorn was used in the soundtrack of the film Final Destination 5.

== Discography ==
=== Albums ===
Year	Album	Peak positions			Notes
Year	Album	FR	BEL (Wa)	SWI	Notes
2008	The Peaceful Riot	17	20	79	Track list: 1. "God Is My Lover" (4:25); 2. "New Day" (2:55); 3. "Birth" (4:39); 4. "Tonight" (3:50); 5. "Water Lily" (5:23); 6. "The Voice of the Lost Souls" (3:26); 7. "Forbidden Song" (5:03); 8. "The One" (3:04); 9. "The Fever" (4:41); 10. "My Empress" (2:25); 11. "March On" (4:27); 12. "Join Us" (6:04)
2011	Unicorn	118	–	–	Track list: 1. "It's Gonna Be" (2:35); 2. "Give Me More" (3:18); 3. "Do It" (3:23); 4. "Goodbye" (3:22); 5. "Helena" (2:44); 6. "Happy and Lost" (3:10); 7. "My Own Short News Item" (4:26); 8. "Souvenir" (3:07); 9. "Under the Fur" (3:24); 10. "Still Here" (4:31); 11. "Quiet" (2:26)

=== EPs ===
Year	Album	Peak positions	Notes
Year	Album	FR	Notes
2009	Your Skin My Skin EP	–	Track list: 1. "Your Skin My Skin" (3:19); 2. "Way Out" (2:53); 3. "Say It" (3:04); 4. "To the Blood" (3:43); 5. "Birth" (Acoustic Version) (3:59)

=== Singles ===
(Selective)

- 2008: "New Day"
- 2009: "Your Skin My Skin"
