= Le Chemin (Emmanuel Moire album) =

Studio album by Emmanuel Moire
- Released: 29 April 2013
- Recorded: France
- Genre: Pop
- Label: Universal Music

Emmanuel Moire chronology
L'Équilibre (2009)	Le Chemin (2013)

Le Chemin (French pronunciation: [lə ʃəmɛ̃], lit. 'The Way') is the third studio album by the French singer Emmanuel Moire. As his contract with the Warner Music record label had expired in May 2011 after the release of his first album, (Là) Où je pars in 2007, and the follow-up, L'Équilibre in 2009, Moire said in 2012 that he was searching for a new record label for materials he was preparing for a third album. At Mercury, an affiliate of Universal Music Group, he met Dominique Gau, who had just joined Mercury as artistic director from Warner, Olivier Nuss and Éric Lelièvre. He announced on 14 January 2013 that Mercury would release his forthcoming album.

The album was released on 29 April 2013 containing 15 tracks. All the songs were co-written by Yann Guillon and by Moire, and all were produced by Moire and Ninjamix.

"Beau malheur" was pre-released as the first single from the album in February 2013.

== Track listing ==
=== Ordinary edition ===
(All songs co-written by Yann Guillon and Emmanuel Moire. All songs produced by Emmanuel Moire and Ninjamix)

1. La Vie ailleurs (5:15)
2. Beau malheur (3:37)
3. Venir voir (4:05)
4. Je ne sais rien (3;30)
5. La Blessure (4:37)
6. Vous deux (4:05)
7. Ici ailleurs (3:31)
8. Le Jour (3:18)
9. Mon Possible (4:04)
10. Ne s'aimer que la nuit (4:03)
11. Quatre vies (3:38)
12. La Vie ici (5:15)

=== Limited edition ===
1. La Vie ailleurs (5:15)
2. Beau malheur (3:37)
3. Venir voir (4:05)
4. Je ne sais rien (3;30)
5. Suffit mon amour (limited edition) (3:03)
6. La Blessure (4:37)
7. Vous deux (4:05)
8. Ici ailleurs (3:31)
9. Le Jour (3:18)
10. Ce qui me vient (limited edition) (2:58)
11. Mon Possible (4:04)
12. Ne s'aimer que la nuit (4:03)
13. L'Abri et la demeure (limited edition) (3:54)
14. Quatre vies (3:38)
15. La Vie ici (5:15)

== Chart performance ==
=== Weekly charts ===
Chart (2013)	Peak position
Belgian Albums (Ultratop Wallonia)	4
French Albums (SNEP)	1
Swiss Albums (Schweizer Hitparade)	28

=== Year-end charts ===
Chart (2013)	Position
Belgian Albums (Ultratop Wallonia)	12
French Albums (SNEP)	15

Chart (2014)	Position
Belgian Albums (Ultratop Wallonia)	50
French Albums (SNEP)	87
