= Le Chemin (Kyo album) =

Studio album by Kyo
- Released: January 13, 2003
- Recorded: France, 2003
- Genre: Pop; rock
- Length: 41:56
- Label: Zomba; EMI Music

Kyo chronology
| Kyo (2001) | Le Chemin (2003) | 300 Lésions (2004) |

Singles from Le Chemin
- 1. "Le Chemin" Released: November 2002; 2. "Dernière danse" Released: April 2003; 3. "Je cours" Released: September 2003; 4. "Je saigne encore" Released: January 2004

Professional ratings
Review scores
| Source | Rating |
|---|---|
| Allmusic | 3/5 stars |

Le Chemin (French pronunciation: [lə ʃəmɛ̃], lit. 'The Way') is a 2003 album recorded by French pop-rock act Kyo. It was released on January 13, 2003, and achieved huge success in France and Belgium (Wallonia), where it was respectively #2 and #1. This album, entirely composed by the band, remains to date its most successful one. There is also an edition including a DVD.

It stayed on the charts for 65 weeks in Belgium, 98 weeks in France and 79 weeks in Switzerland. It provided four top 20 singles in France and Belgium : "Le Chemin" (#12 in France, #4 in Belgium, #14 in Switzerland), "Dernière danse" (#6 in France, #4 in Belgium, #14 in Switzerland), "Je cours" (#20 in France, #8 in Belgium, #41 in Switzerland) and "Je saigne encore" (#13 in France, #12 in Belgium, #39 in Switzerland).

The album was awarded 'Francophone album of the year' at the 2004 NRJ Music Awards.

== Track listing ==
1. "Le Chemin" (duet with Sita) — 3:31
2. "Je cours" — 3:01
3. "Dernière danse" — 3:48
4. "Tout envoyer en l'air" — 3:12
5. "Chaque seconde" — 3:50
6. "Comment te dire" — 4:44
7. "Je saigne encore" — 4:02
8. "Je te vends mon âme" — 3:31
9. "Pardonné" — 3:36
10. "Sur nos lèvres" — 4:05
11. "Tout reste à faire" — 4:56

Source: Allmusic.

== Personnel and credits ==
- Vocals: Benoît Poher and Fabien Dubos
- Guitar: Nicolas Chassagne and Florian Dubos
- Drums: Fabien Dubos
- Bass: Laurent Vernerey
- Choir arrangement: Jean François Berger
- Assistant: Elise Chambeyron
- Programming: Matthew Vaughan and Nicolas Chassagne
- Sampling: Nicolas Chassagne
- Mastering: Ian Cooper
- Mixing: Francois Delabriere
- Engineering: Hubert Decottignies and François Delabrière
- Photography; Marco De La Rosa
- Production: François Delabrière

== Releases ==
| Date | Label | Country | Format | Catalog |
|---|---|---|---|---|
| January 2003 | BMG / Jive | Belgium, France, Switzerland | CD | 653329 |
| October 2003 | EMI Music | Belgium, France, Switzerland | CD | 79224722 |

== Certifications and sales ==
| Country | Certification | Date | Sales certified | Physical sales |
|---|---|---|---|---|
| Belgium | Platinum | March 28, 2004 | 50,000 | |
| France | Diamond | March 3, 2004 | 1,000,000 | 999,200 |
| Switzerland | Platinum | 2003 | 40,000 | |

== Charts ==
| Chart (2003–2005) | Peak position |
|---|---|
| Belgian (Wallonia) Albums Chart | 1 |
| French SNEP Albums Chart | 2 |
| Swiss Albums Chart | 10 |

| End of year chart (2003) | Position |
|---|---|
| Belgian (Wallonia) Albums Chart | 3 |
| French Albums Chart | 4 |
| Swiss Albums Chart | 33 |
| End of year chart (2004) | Position |
| French Albums Chart | 9 |
| Swiss Albums Chart | 51 |
| End of year chart (2005) | Position |
| French Albums Chart | 142 |
