= Francis Lalanne =

French singer

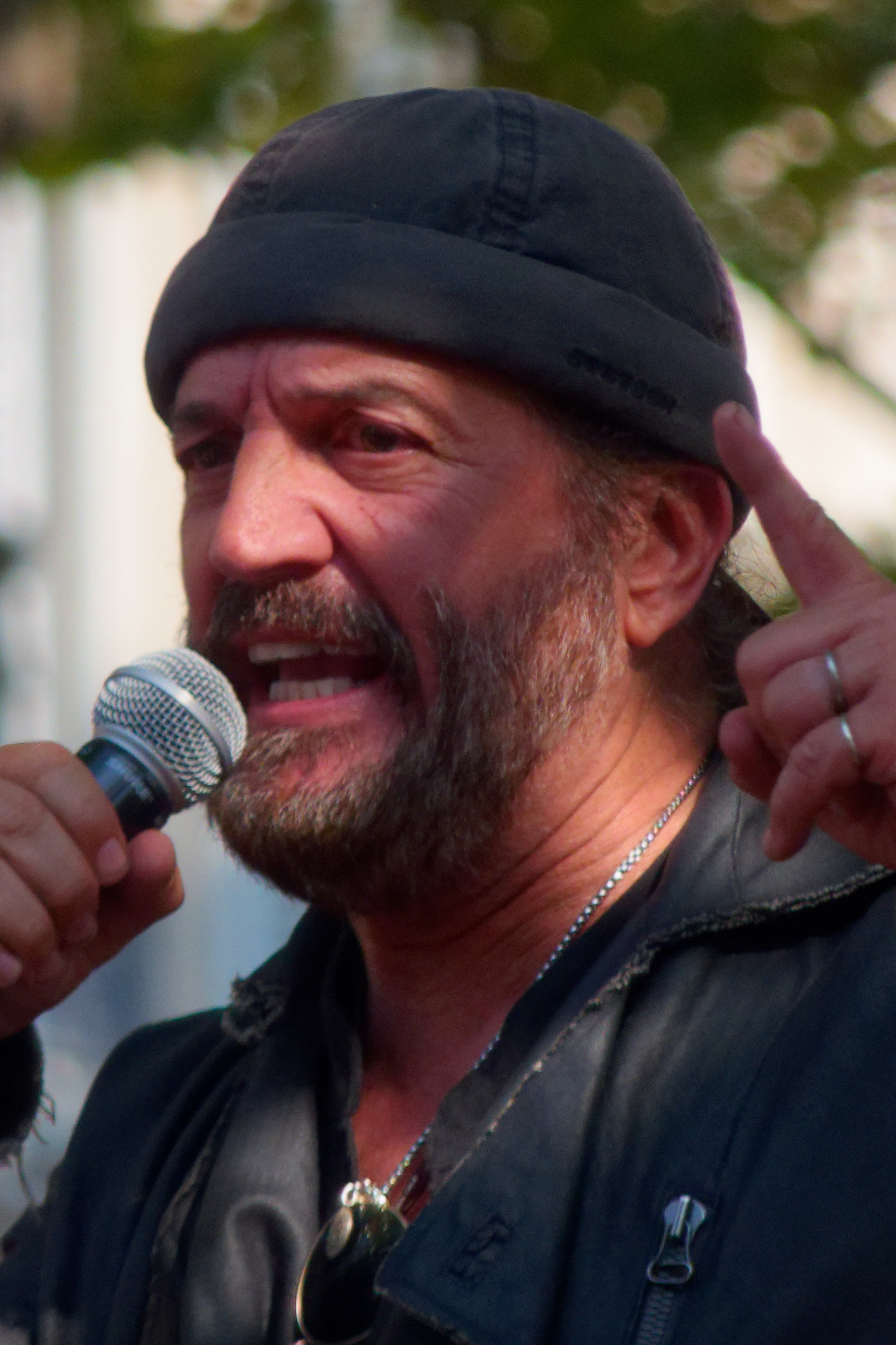

Background information
- Birth name: Francis-José Lalanne
- Born: 8 August 1958 (age 66); Bayonne
- Occupation: Singer
- Years active: 1977-present

Francis Lalanne (born 8 August 1958) is a French-Uruguayan singer, songwriter and poet. He is the brother of composer Jean-Félix Lalanne and film director René Manzor.

== Free Art ==
He opposed the HADOPI law in 2009 and has supported the French free software community saying that the purpose of art is not to make money but conscience, and it is the duty of any author to promote the free dissemination of this conscience. He wrote the book Révoltons-nous, published in August 2011 under the free art license.

== Political commitment ==
Francis Lalanne was several times a candidate in elections under the ecological banner, was a supporter of the yellow vests movement. He led a Yellow Alliance list in the European elections of May 2019, obtaining 0.54% of the votes.

On 22 February 2021, he was investigated for "provocation to the commission of attacks on the fundamental interests of the nation" after he signed an op-ed, published on the FranceSoir website, calling to "put the State out of harm's way", the Paris public prosecutor's office said on Monday 22 February.

== Discography ==
=== Studio albums ===
- 1979: Rentre chez toi
- 1980: Francis Lalanne
- 1981: Toi mon vieux copain
- 1982: Celle qui m'a emmené
- 1984: Amis d'en France
- 1985: Coup de foudre
- 1986: Mai 86
- 1988: De Corazón
- 1990: Avec toi
- 1992: Tendresses
- 1994: Les Inédits
- 1996: Face cachée
- 2000: Sans papiers
- 2003: D'une vie à l'autre
- 2005: Reptile
- 2009: Ouvrir son cœur
- 2010: Blaïte music

=== Live albums ===
- 1983: Lalanne à Pantin
- 1993: Zénith 93
- 2006: Au Casino de Paris

=== Compilations ===
- 1995: Flash-Back
- 2007: Best of

== Publications ==
- 1986: Ajedhora, Flammarion.
- 1993: Le Roman d'Arcanie, Les Belles Lettres.
- 1994: Les Carnets de Lucifer, Les Belles Lettres.
- 1995: Le Journal de Joseph, Éditions du Rocher.
- 1997: D'Amour et de Mots, Les Belles Lettres. Tristan Tzara prize in 1997.
- 1999: Éliade ou l'Idéale, Les Belles Lettres.
- 2000: Le Petit Livre de l'Enfant, Éditions du Rocher, with co-author Stella Sulak.
- 2003: Drac. ou le Soliloque du Vampire, Les Belles Lettres.
- 2004: Les Carnets de Lucifer – Mon Journal Intime, Les Belles Lettres.
- 2006: Skizogrammes, Pantoums, Éditions Bibliophane.
- 2008: Mère Patrie, Planète Mère, Éditions Pascal Petiot. Lauriers Verts award at La Forêt des Livres in 2008.
- 2009: La bataille Hadopi, In Libro Veritas (group of authors).
- 2009: Mise en Demeure à Monsieur le Président de la République Française, Jean-Claude Gawsewitch Éditeur.
- 2011: Révoltons-nous, Éditions in Libro Veritas.

== Filmography ==
Cinéma

- 1995: Marie de Nazareth by Jean Delannoy
- 2008: Astérix at the Olympic Games, by Frédéric Forestier and Thomas Langmann
- 2008: Disco, by Fabien Onteniente
- 2010: Orso - La Marche de l'Enfant Roi, by Magà Ettori: Senator Vasco

As a voice actor

- 1996: The Hunchback of Notre Dame: French voice of Quasimodo
- 2002: The Hunchback of Notre Dame II: French voice of Quasimodo

== Other ==
In 2011, he participated in the second season of Danse avec les stars – the French version of Dancing with the Stars. He was partnered with professional dancer Silvia Notargiacomo. On November 5, 2011, they were eliminated finishing 5th.

== See also ==
=== See also ===
- Music of France
- Chanson française
