= Sita (singer) =

Dutch singer

Sita Vermeulen
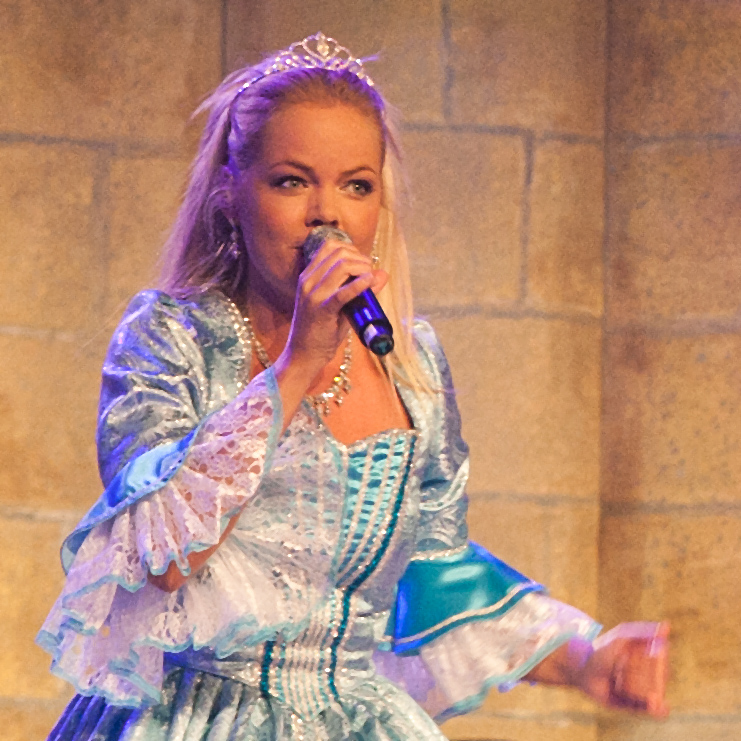
- Sita during the Fairy Tale Concert on June 12, 2011

Background information
- Also known as: Sita
- Born: Sita Maria Vermeulen; 8 June 1980 (age 46); Ilpendam, Netherlands
- Origin: Netherlands
- Genres: Pop, Pop rock
- Occupation: Singer
- Instruments: vocals, guitar
- Years active: 2001–present

Sita Maria Vermeulen (born 8 June 1980), known by the mononym Sita, is a Dutch pop singer. She rose to fame in the early 2000s as part of the pop group K-otic. After leaving the band in 2001, she had a brief solo career before turning to television, where she was featured primarily on children's television and was a candidate on Sterren Dansen Op Het IJs, the Dutch adaption of Dancing on Ice as well as the Dutch version of Dancing With The Stars. Since 2009, she has been hosting the Dutch Disney Channel.

== Biography ==
Sita's career started in 2001 when she entered in the Dutch television show Starmaker, which was a casting show intended to create a group. During the show, Sita became a member of a pop group which was called K-otic. Due to the popularity of the show, the group scored a few hits. In December 2001, Sita left to pursue a solo career, releasing Happy, her first solo single, which topped the Dutch charts and also became a minor hit in some other European countries. In January 2002 her first solo album, also called Happy, followed.

In 2002, Sita released Happy in the United States, and the song "Happy" was also included in the soundtrack of The Wild Thornberrys Movie. As a consequence, she received some coverage on Nickelodeon.

Within Europe, she became more known in 2003 when she had the hit song "Le Chemin" together with the French group Kyo.

In 2007, Spanish singer Edurne released a cover of her song "Come With Me" under the name Ven Por Mi, achieving success in the Spanish charts.

== Discography ==
=== Happy (2002) ===
1. Happy (written by Jacqueline Nemorin & Tobias Gad) - 4:08
2. Jerk (written by Kim Stockwood & Naoise Sheridan) - 4:09
3. Selfish (written by Andreas Karlegård & Lisa Lindebergh) - 3:58
4. Hello (written by Daniel Gibson & Julius Bengtsson) - 3:02
5. I Surrender (written by Linus Nordén, Negin Djafari, Patrick Johansson & Robert Zuddas) - 3:48
6. The World Goes Round (written by Carol Ann Brown & Stephanie Bentley) - 3:59
7. You Make Me Feel (Like Myself) (written by Douglas Carr, Nik Kershaw & Pär Lönn) - 2:58
8. Twisted (written by Mareme Hernandez, Paul Varney & Sarah Nagourney) - 5:08
9. Backseat (written by Douglas Carr & Tamara Champlin) - 4:01
10. Strong Winds (written by Douglas Carr & Ulric Johansson) - 4:33
11. Everything (written by Alexis Strum, Ian Bouman & Paul Westcott) - 3:44
12. Whenever (written by Alex Von Soos & Tom Nichols) - 4:27

=== Come with Me (2003) ===
1. Come with Me (written by Ben Copland, Lisa Lindebergh & Jimmy Monell)
2. Popstar (written by Johan Ekhé, Ulf Lindström, Remee and Robyn)
3. Every Little Thing You Do (written by Stephanie Bentley & George Teren)
4. My Kitchen (written by Lisa Lindebergh)
5. Hold Me for a Moment (written by Thomas Gustafsson, Jamie Hartman & Hugo Lira)
6. Red Guitar (written by Douglas Carr, Kasper Lindgren & Joakim Udd)
7. Even As Your Friend (written by Anders Bergström & Daniel Gibson)
8. Gravity (written by Peter Björklund, Patrik Johansson & Linus Nordén)
9. A Million Stars (written by Robert Åhlin & Kristina Johnsson)
10. Weak (written by Peter Björklund)
11. With You (written by Douglas Carr, Kasper Lindgren & Joakim Udd)
12. I Draw The Line (written by Tony Cornelissen & Jonas Filtenborg)

=== L'Envers du décor (2004) ===
1. Ce qui nous rend fous
2. Hello
3. L'Envers du décor
4. Red Guitar
5. Si on court
6. Rien à perdre
7. Jerk
8. Selfish
9. With You
10. Come with Me
11. My Kitchen
12. Bizarre Love Triangle
13. Happy (bonus)
