= L'Équilibre (Kyo album) =

Studio album by Kyo
- Released: 24 March 2014
- Recorded: France
- Length: 44:38

Singles from L'Équilibre
- 1. "Le Graal" Released: 27 January 2014; 2. "L'Équilibre" Released: 3 February 2014

L'Équilibre (French pronunciation: [lekilibʁ], lit. 'The Balance') is the fourth studio album recorded by French pop-rock band Kyo. It was released on 24 March 2014.

== Track listing ==
No.	Title	Length
1.	"Poupées russes"	3:37
2.	"Le Graal"	3:11
3.	"L'Équilibre"	4:33
4.	"Enfant du solstice"	3:49
5.	"Les vents contraires"	3:03
6.	"Nuits blanches"	3:27
7.	"XY"	3:53
8.	"Madone"	3:18
9.	"Récidiviste"	3:53
10.	"On se tourne autour"	4:01
11.	"White Trash"	3:43
12.	"Le Cœur des femmes" (Bonus track)	4:04
13.	"Born to Kiss" (Bonus track)	3:24
14.	"La Route"	4:10

== Charts ==
Chart performance for L'Équilibre
Chart (2014)	Peak position
French Albums (SNEP)	2
Belgian Albums (Ultratop Flanders)	99
Belgian Albums (Ultratop Wallonia)	3
Swiss Albums (Schweizer Hitparade)	20
