= Le Chemin (song) =

Single by Kyo featuring Sita

from the album Le Chemin
- B-side: "Chaque seconde"
- Released: November 2003
- Recorded: 2002
- Genre: Pop
- Length: 3:29
- Label: Jive
- Songwriter: Kyo
- Producers: François Delabrière; Kyo

Kyo featuring Sita singles chronology
"Le Chemin" (2003)	"Dernière danse" (2003)

"Le Chemin" (French pronunciation: [lə ʃəmɛ̃], lit. 'The Way') is a 2002 song recorded by French band Kyo as a duet with Dutch pop singer Sita. It was the first single from the album Le Chemin on which it appears as the first track, and was later notably included on Kyo's 2004 compilation Best of and on NRJ Music Awards 2003. Written and composed by Kyo, the single was released in November 2002 and achieved some success. In 2004, the song was awarded 'Francophone Song of the Year' at the NRJ Music Awards.

== Chart performance ==
"Le Chemin" achieved success in France, where it reached number 12 on 4 January 2003 and totaled 27 weeks on the chart (top 100). It peaked at number four on 15 February 2003 on the Ultratop 50 (Belgian Walloon chart) and remained for 22 weeks in the top 40, five of them spent in the top ten. In Switzerland, it reached number 14 for two weeks and fell off the top 100 after 24 weeks of presence.

== Track listings ==
CD single

No.	Title	Length
1.	"Le Chemin" (Duet with Sita)	3:29
2.	"Chaque seconde"	3:49

Digital download (since 2005)

No.	Title	Length
1.	"Le Chemin" (Duet with Sita)	3:29

== Charts ==
=== Weekly charts ===
Weekly chart performance for "Le Chemin"
Chart (2002–2003)	Peak position
Belgium (Ultratop 50 Wallonia)	4
Europe (Eurochart Hot 100 Singles)	36
France (SNEP)	12
Netherlands (Single Top 100)	60
Quebec (ADISQ)	13
Switzerland (Schweizer Hitparade)	14

=== Year-end charts ===
2002 year-end chart performance for "Le Chemin"
Chart (2002)	Position
France (SNEP)	96

2003 year-end chart performance for "Le Chemin"
Chart (2003)	Position
Belgium (Wallonia Ultratop 50)	31
France (SNEP)	67

== Certifications and sales ==
Certifications for "Le Chemin"
Region	Certification	Certified units/sales
France (SNEP)	Silver	125,000^{*}
^{*} Sales figures based on certification alone.
