= Vegastar =

French rock band

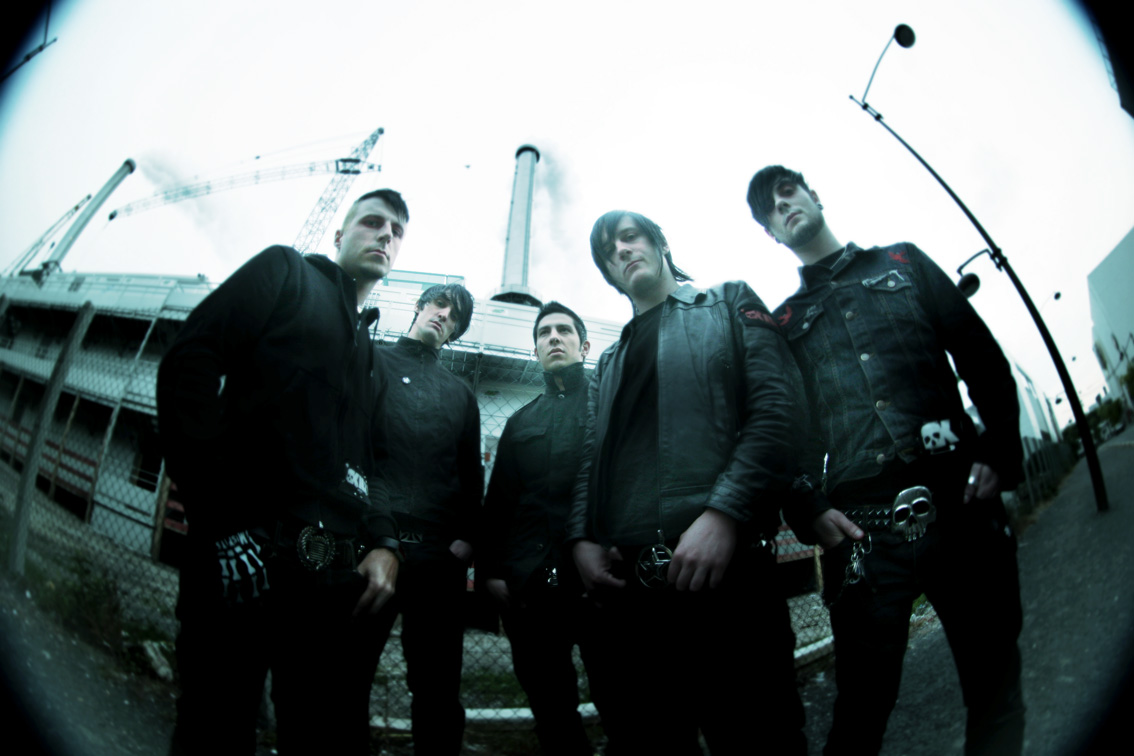
- Vegastar in 2005

Background information
- Origin: Orléans, Centre, France
- Genres: Alternative metal; nu metal; alternative rock; electro rock
- Years active: 2001–2009; 2015–2018
- Members: Franklin Ferrand; Jérôme "Jey" Riera; Jocelyn Moze; Vincent Mercier
- Past members: Aurélien Bigot; Fabien Garcia; Phaabs; Vincent Girault

Vegastar was a French rock band from Orléans which formed in 2001. They broke up in 2015 and reunited briefly for a short tour in 2018.

== Background ==
Vegastar formed as a project by members of the band Human Beat Box. They signed to a major record label and released their debut album, "Un nouvel orage", in 2005. "100ème étage", from that album, reached number 17 in the French singles chart. They released their second album, "Télévision", in 2008.

Vegastar announced their official disbanding in 2015 on the ten-year anniversary of "Un nouvel orage", re-releasing the album with bonus tracks that year. They briefly reunited in 2018 to tour and release a brand new single, "Dorian".

== Discography ==
- Un nouvel orage (2005)
- Télévision (2008)
