= Taïg Khris =

Entrepreneur and former professional skater

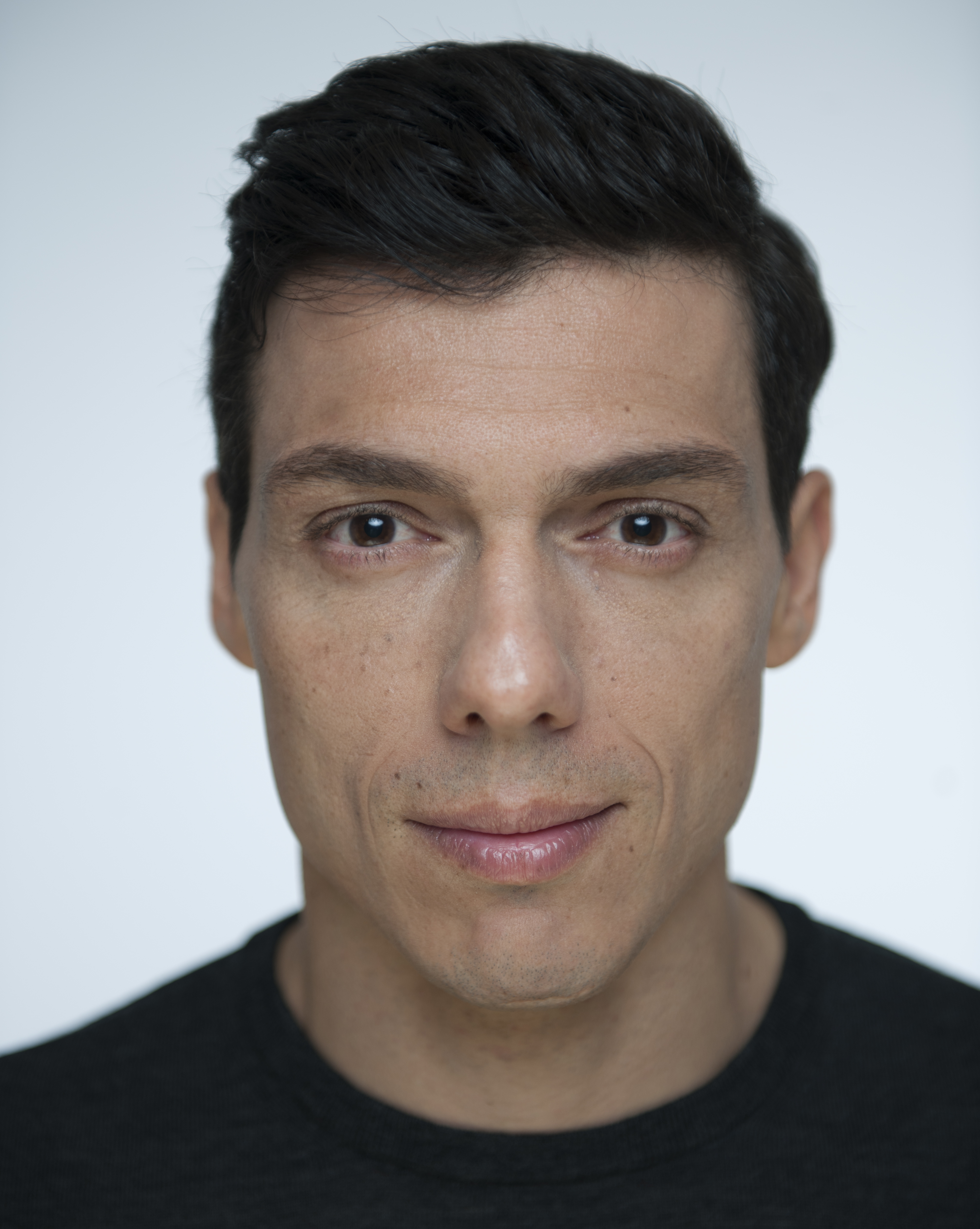

Personal information
- Born: Taïg Khris Gattos
- Website: taigkhris.com

Sport
- Country: France
- Sport: Vert skating

Taïg Khris is an entrepreneur and former professional vert skater.

== Biography ==
He was born on July 27, 1975 in Algiers, Algeria.

In 2010, Taïg dropped from the first floor of the Eiffel Tower, 131 feet (40 m), onto a massive vert ramp below, and broke the world record for the highest inline skate jump.
