= L'Équilibre (Emmanuel Moire album) =

Studio album by Emmanuel Moire
- Released: 13 April 2009
- Recorded: France
- Genre: Pop
- Label: Jive Records

Emmanuel Moire chronology
(Là) Où je pars (2007)	L'Équilibre (2009)	Le Chemin (2013)

L'Équilibre (French pronunciation: [lekilibʁ], lit. 'The Balance') is the second album recorded by French singer Emmanuel Moire. It was released on 13 April 2009. Three tracks from the album were released as singles – "Adulte & Sexy", "Sans dire un mot" & "Promis".

== Track listing ==
(All songs co-written by Yann Guillon and Emmanuel Moire, except for "Habillez-moi" cowritten by Doriand and Claire Joseph. All songs produced by Emmanuel Moire and Ninjamix)

1. "Suite et fin" (5:30)
2. "Adulte & sexy" (3:17)
3. "Sans dire un mot" (3:34)
4. "Mieux vaut toi que jamais" (3:25)
5. "L'Adversaire" (4:49)
6. "Dis-moi encore" (3:48)
7. "Promis" (4:03)
8. "Attraction" (4:16)
9. "Habillez-moi" (4:36)
10. "Sois tranquille" (4:43)
11. "Retour à la vie" (7:42)

== Charts ==
=== Weekly charts ===
Chart (2009)	Peak position
Belgian Albums (Ultratop Wallonia)	19
French Albums (SNEP)	7
Swiss Albums (Schweizer Hitparade)	92

=== Year-end charts ===
Chart (2009)	Position
French Albums (SNEP)	105
