= Tété =

French musician (born 1975)

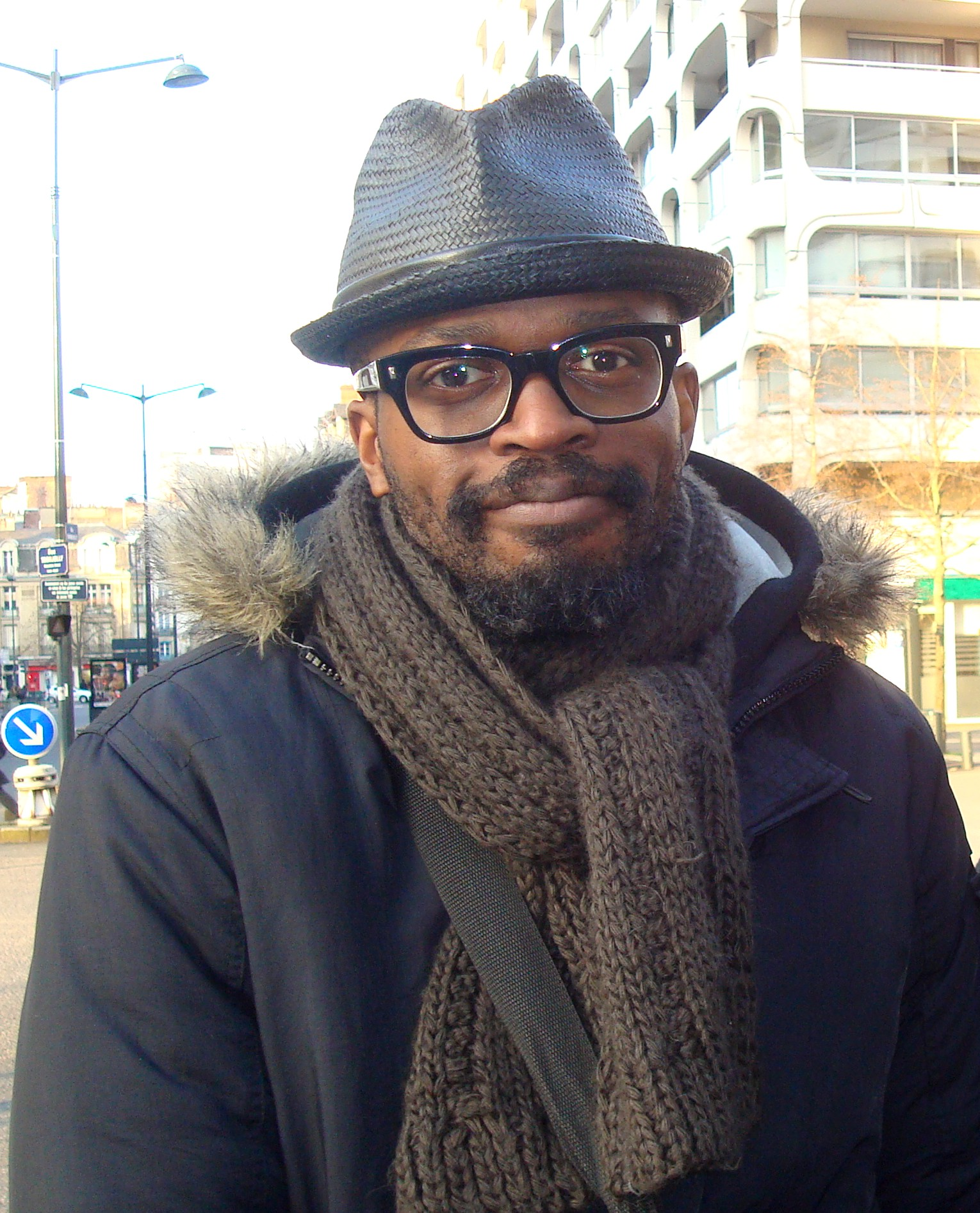
- Tété in 2010

Background information
- Born: Niang Mahmoud Tété; 25 July 1975 (age 51); Dakar, Senegal
- Genres: Pop-folk; Rock
- Occupation: Singer
- Instrument: Guitar
- Label: Sony Music
- Website: www.tete.tt

Niang Mahmoud Tété (born 25 July 1975) is a French musician. His mother is from Martinique and his father is from Senegal.

Tété is described as the French version of Jeff Buckley. Tété's music can be described as an intimate, solo classical guitar musical style. He defines himself to be a "troubadour and manufacturer of pop-folk-bluesy songs with intellectual pretensions." His music combines blues, folk and pop influences, such as the Delta blues, Lenny Kravitz, the Beatles and Bob Dylan.

== Discography ==
=== Albums ===
Studio albums

Year	Album	Peak positions	
Year	Album	FRA	BEL (Wa)
2000	Préambule	—	—
2001	L'Air de rien	39	—
2003	À la faveur de l'automne	16	81
2006	Le sacre des lemmings et autres contes de la lisière	5	68
2010	Le premier clair de l'aube	11	93
2013	Nu là-bas	24	—
2016	Les chroniques de Pierrot Lunaire	33	187
2019	Fauthentique	80	—

Live albums

Year	Album	Peak positions
Year	Album	FRA
2003	Par monts et vallons	78

Compilation albums

Year	Album	Peak positions
Year	Album	FR
2006	Putain de toi: Un hommage à Brassens	—
2008	Night in France	—

=== Singles ===
Year	Single	Peak positions	Album
Year	Single	FR	Album
2014	"À la faveur de l'automne"	166	À la faveur de l'automne
