= Emmanuel Moire =

French singer

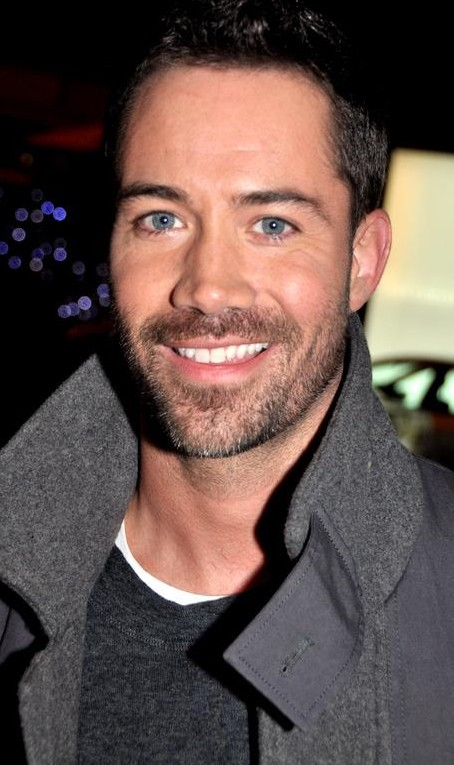
- Emmanuel Moire during the NRJ Music Awards 2013

Background information
- Born: 16 June 1979 (age 46); Le Mans, France
- Genres: Pop
- Occupation: Singer
- Years active: 2004–present
- Label: Warner Music France
- Website: www.emmanuelmoire.com

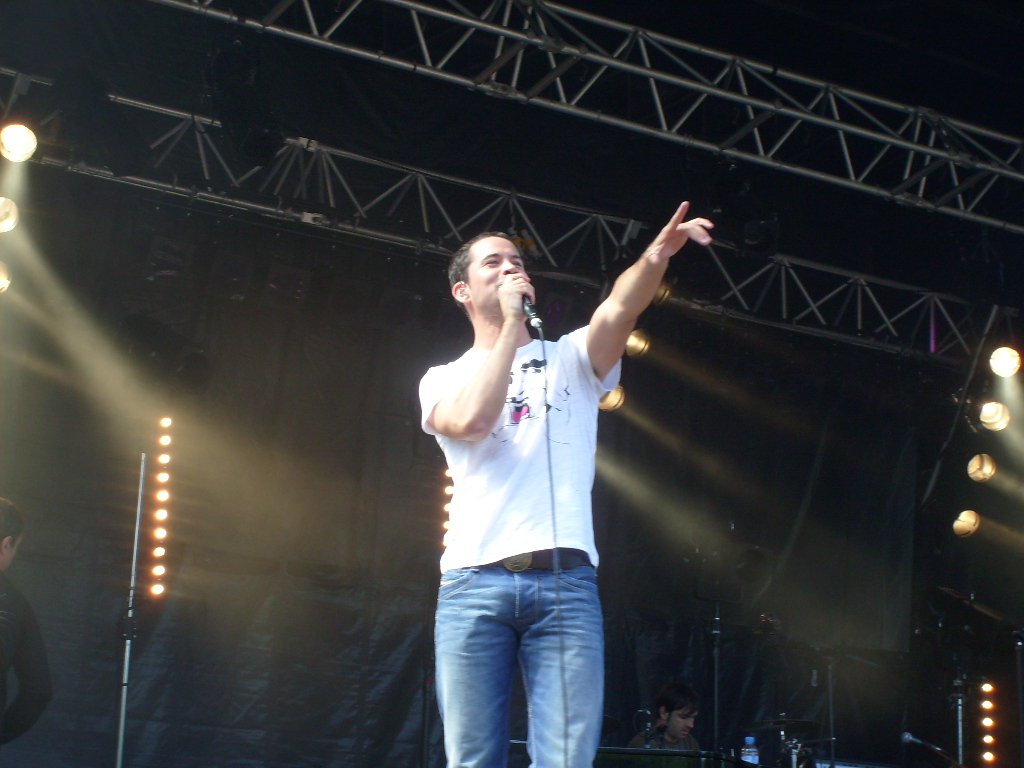
Emmanuel Moire in concert at Dunkerque

Emmanuel Moire (French pronunciation: [emanɥɛl mwaʁ]; born 16 June 1979) is a French singer, best known for playing Louis XIV in the French stage musical Le Roi Soleil.

Moire has released four albums (Là) Où je pars (2006), L'Équilibre (2009), Le Chemin (2013) and La Rencontre (2015). He sings and plays the piano, with a hundred tunes to his credit. He participated on TV show Danse avec les Stars, which he won in December 2012.

== Career ==
At 21 years of age, Emmanuel was selected to take part in the 16th meeting of Astaffort, a training course for songwriters and performers. Between 2004 and 2007, he played Louis XIV in the successful musical Le Roi Soleil, whose cast included Christophe Maé and Merwan Rim.

Emmanuel Moire released his first solo album, titled Là où je pars, on 13 November 2006. With British pop influences, the album paid special attention to the melodies even more than the emotions. The piano, vocals and beautiful guitar segments led the listener to a place where love, sufferings and the small joys of the life all mixed. On his Facebook site, Emmanuel said his first album was "about the universal topics which I wanted to treat in a personal way. The role of an artist, it is to invite people into his universe, to give all that he has in him so that each one finds his own story there." "This album is the fruit of a lot of collaboration. I wanted it to represent me so that people could discover me, musically, there." "It is easy to see that this album is a reunion of those close to me at Astaffort. Those, who for several years, share in the same hopes and dreams: Claire Joseph, Yann Guillon, Benoît Poher, Davide Esposito, Christophe Beucher..." The first single from the album was "Le Sourire".

His second album, titled L'Équilibre was released in April 2009, and includes songs such as "Adulte et Sexy" and "Sans dire un mot" which were made into music videos. "Sois Tranquille" is a very personal song for Moire. In an interview by Deborah Laurent for 7sur7, he said: "The music was already written when my brother passed away. I wanted to speak about my brother, of his uncommon greatness. I lost my brother on 28 January. I just said to myself that it was not necessary for me to speak, because I was going to speak about my suffering. I wanted it to be more positive, a homage, some thing more spiritual. Therefore, I 'lent' my voice to my brother."

Emmanuel Moire represented France at the 2007 Sopot Festival in Poland performing his song "Ça me fait du bien" coming runner-up to eventual winner, the Polish band Feel.

In 2019, Moire participated in the 2019 edition of Destination Eurovision to attempt to represent France at the Eurovision Song Contest 2019 in Tel Aviv, Israel, with the song "La promesse". He placed fourth overall in the final.

== Personal life ==
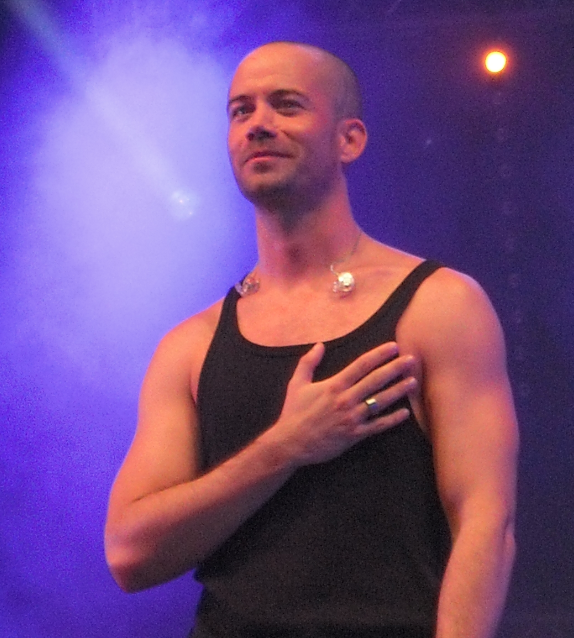
Emmanuel Moire in 2010

He and his twin brother Nicolas were born in Le Mans on 16 June 1979.

In early 2008, Emmanuel Moire was hit by a car outside his Paris residence. He received a sprained ankle and three cracked ribs. The accident caused him to miss a performance in Strasbourg and the NRJ Music Awards.

On 12 January 2009, Emmanuel's twin brother Nicolas was run over by a car. Nicolas went into a coma and died two weeks later, on 28 January 2009. He was 29.

Moire came out as gay in the French LGBT magazine Têtu in October 2009. In that interview he said, "I hope to live a normal discreet life. I am at peace with myself."

== Charity work ==
Moire has been a member of the Les Enfoirés charity ensemble since 2014.

== Discography ==
=== Albums ===
Year	Album	Peak positions			Certification	Notes
Year	Album	FR	BEL (Wa)	SWI	Certification	Notes
2006	(Là) Où je pars	8	34	94	France: Platinum	
2009	L'Équilibre	7	19	92	France: Gold	
2013	Le Chemin	1	4	28	France:Double Platinum	
2015	La rencontre	2	2	19		
2019	Odyssée	6	3	23		

=== Singles ===
Year	Single	Peak positions				Certification	Album
Year	Single	FR	BEL (Wa) Ultratop	BEL (Wa) Ultratip*	SWI	Certification	Album
2004	"Être à la hauteur"	9	19	–	32	France: Silver	Le Roi Soleil
2005	"Je fais de toi mon essentiel"	3	7	–	26	France: Silver	Le Roi Soleil
2006	"La vie passe" (Cathialine Andria & Emmanuel Moire)	28	–	16	–		Le Roi Soleil
2006	"Le sourire"	7	31	–	–		(Là) Où je pars
2007	"Là où je pars"	–	–	18	–		(Là) Où je pars
2009	"Adulte & Sexy"	9	–	2	–		L'Équilibre
2010	"Sans dire un mot"	11	–	14	–		L'Équilibre
2012	"Sois tranquille"	21	–	–	–		L'Équilibre
2012	"Beau malheur"	11	11	–	–		Le Chemin
2013	"Ne s'aimer que la nuit"	72	31	–	–		Le Chemin
2015	"Bienvenue"	46	41	–	–		La rencontre
2015	"Toujours debout"	163	34	–	–		La rencontre
2018	"Et si on parlait d'amour"	24	–	–	–		

*Did not appear in the official Belgian Ultratop 50 charts, but rather in the bubbling under Ultratip charts.

Other charted songs

Year	Single	Peak positions	Album
Year	Single	FR	Album
2012	"Au bout de mes rêves" (with Amandine Bourgeois)	143	Non-album release
2016	"Le chanteur"	115	Non-album release

Featured in

Year	Single	Peak positions	Album
Year	Single	FR	Album
2012	"Seras-tu là" (Live) (Le Forestier / Ségara / Thomas Dutronc / Badi / Moire / Lââm / Foly / Grégoire / Clerc)	126	
