= ZZ Ward discography =

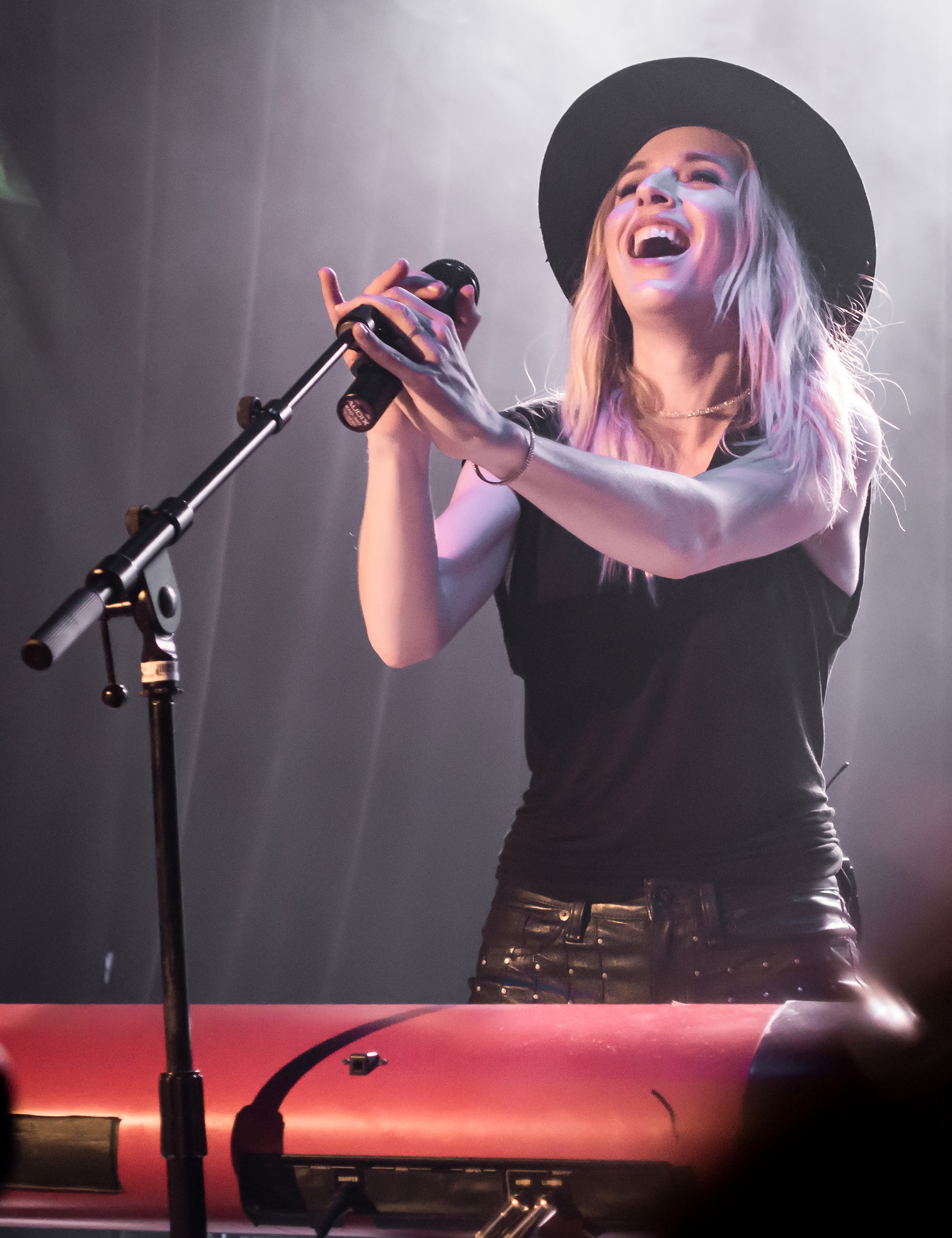
- ZZ Ward performing live at The Roxy, on 2017.
- Studio albums: 4
- EPs: 5
- Mixtapes: 1
- Singles: 26
- Promotional singles: 8
- Music videos: 28

American blues singer and songwriter ZZ Ward has released four studio albums, one mixtape, five extended plays (EPs), twenty-six singles and twenty-eight music videos.

Ward made her debut with the release of her first mixtape Eleven Roses, which was uploaded by Ward on SoundCloud as an independent artist on 2012. After signing to Hollywood Records, Ward released her first extended play Criminal, which preceded the release of her debut studio album, Til the Casket Drops, in October of that year. The album debuted at seventy-two on the Billboard 200 and has sold over 146,000 units (as August 2015). It spawned three singles: "Put the Gun Down", "365 Days", and "Last Love Song", which reached numbers seven, four, and fifteen on the US Adult Alternative Airplay Chart, respectively.

In 2015, Ward released "Love 3x" as the lead single of her third extended play Love and War, released that year. In 2017, Ward released her second studio album, The Storm which debuted at number one on the Billboard Blues Chart, and seventy-five on the Billboard 200. It spawned three singles: "Help Me Mama", "Cannonball", and "Domino", and includes the single "Ride" which was written for soundtrack of the animated motion picture, Cars 3.

During 2019 and 2020, Ward released four stand-alone singles: "Sex & Stardust", "Break Her Heart", "The Dark", and "Giant". The latter marked Ward's last release under Hollywood Records after parting ways with record label. Ward released her third studio album Dirty Shine in September 2023. It spawned five singles: "Tin Cups", "Baby Don't", "Ride or Die", "Forget About Us", and "On One". A deluxe version titled Dirty Deluxe, was released on November 17, which was promoted by the release of "Evil on the Inside", the album sixth and final single.

In 2024, Ward released two extended plays: Where Did All the Love Go? and Mother, the latter was released under Sun Records, and saw commercial success debuting at number seven on the Billboard Blues Chart, becoming Ward's second top 10 record. It was followed by the release of Ward's fourth studio album Liberation, on 2025. The album included the entire Mother EP and spawned the singles "Love Alive", "Naked In The Jungle", and the album title-track.

== Albums ==
=== Studio albums ===
Title	Album details	Peak chart positions			Sales
Title	Album details	US	US Rock	US Blues	Sales
Til the Casket Drops	Released: October 16, 2012; Label: Hollywood; Formats: CD, digital download	72	31	—	US: 146,000
The Storm	Released: June 30, 2017; Label: Hollywood; Formats: CD, digital download	75	12	1	
Dirty Shine	Released: September 8, 2023; Label: Dirty Shine Records; Formats: digital download	—	—	—	
Liberation	Released: March 14, 2025; Label: Dirty Shine, Sun; Formats: digital download	—	—	5	

=== Mixtapes ===
Title	Details
Eleven Roses	Released: February 1, 2012; Label: Self-released; Formats: Digital download

== Extended plays ==
=== EPs ===
List of extended plays, with selected details and chart positions
Title	Extended play details	Peak chart positions	Ref.
Title	Extended play details	US Blues	Ref.
Criminal EP	Released: May 8, 2012; Label: Hollywood; Formats: CD, digital download	—	
365 Days	Released: April 19, 2013; Label: Hollywood; Formats: CD, digital download	—	
Love and War	Released: August 28, 2015; Label: Hollywood; Formats: CD, digital download	—	
Where Did All the Love Go?	Released: April 5, 2024; Label: Dirty Shine Records; Formats: digital download	—	
Mother	Released: October 4, 2024; Label: Dirty Shine, Sun Records; Formats: digital download	7	
"—" denotes extended play that did not chart or was not released

== Singles ==
=== As lead artist ===
Title	Year	Peak chart positions				Album
Title	Year	US AAA	US Adult	US Alt	US Dance	Album
"Put the Gun Down"	2012	7	—	39	—	Til the Casket Drops
"365 Days"	2013	4	28	—	—	Til the Casket Drops
"Last Love Song"	2014	15	30	—	19	Til the Casket Drops
"Love 3x"	2015	—	—	—	5	Love and War
"The Deep" (featuring Joey Purp)	2017	—	—	—	—	Non-album single
"Help Me Mama"	2017	18	—	—	—	The Storm
"Ride" (featuring Gary Clark Jr.)	2017	—	—	—	—	Cars 3 and The Storm
"Cannonball" (featuring Fantastic Negrito)	2017	25	—	—	—	The Storm
"Domino" (featuring Fitz)	2018	24	—	—	—	The Storm
"Sex & Stardust"	2019	—	—	—	—	Non-album singles
"Break Her Heart"	2020	28	—	—	—	Non-album singles
"The Dark"	2020	—	—	—	—	Non-album singles
"Giant"	2020	—	—	—	—	Non-album singles
"Tin Cups" (with Aloe Blacc)	2022	—	—	—	—	Dirty Shine
"Baby Don't" (solo or featuring DijahSB)	2023	—	—	—	—	Dirty Shine
"Ride or Die" (featuring Vic Mensa)	2023	—	—	—	—	Dirty Shine
"Forget About Us"	2023	—	—	—	—	Dirty Shine
"On One" (featuring Jean Deaux)	2023	—	—	—	—	Dirty Shine
"Evil on the Inside"	2023	—	—	—	—	Dirty Shine (Dirty Deluxe)
"WTH Did I Do?"	2024	—	—	—	—	Where Did All the Love Go?
"Best Friends"	2024	—	—	—	—	Where Did All the Love Go?
"Mother"	2024	—	—	—	—	Mother and Liberation
"My Baby Left Me"	2024	—	—	—	—	Mother and Liberation
"Love Alive"	2025	—	—	—	—	Liberation
"Naked In The Jungle"	2025	—	—	—	—	Liberation
"Liberation"	2025	—	—	—	—	Liberation
"—" denotes single that did not chart or was not released

=== As featured artist ===
Song	Year	Album	Ref.
"See the World" (Remix) (Blended Babies featuring Asher Roth, Chuck Inglish and ZZ Ward)	2013	Non-album single	
"Parties at the Disco" (Asher Roth featuring ZZ Ward)	2014	RetroHash	
"Hold My Heart" (Lindsey Stirling featuring ZZ Ward)	2016	Brave Enough	
"No Rest For The Wicked" ( LVCRFT featuring ZZycho Ward)	2020	The Sequel	

=== Promotional singles ===
Song	Year	Album	Ref.
"Better Off Dead"	2011	Eleven Roses	
"Overdue"	2011	Eleven Roses	
"Save My Life"	2012	Til The Casket Drops	
"Move Like U Stole It"	2013	Til The Casket Drops	
"Blue Eyes Blind"	2014	Til The Casket Drops	
"Criminal"	2014	Til The Casket Drops	
"Bag of Bones"	2018	The Storm	
"I Have No One"	2024	Mother and Liberation	

== Guest appearances ==
List of non-single guest appearances, release year and album name
Title	Year	Album	Ref.
"Insurance" (Asher Roth featuring ZZ Ward, Rockie Fresh, and Blue)	2013	Pabst Jazz	
"Away In a Manger" (Anthony Hamilton featuring ZZ Ward)	2014	Home for the Holidays	
"Breath of Me" (Robben Ford featuring ZZ Ward)	2015	Into the Sun	
"7 Digits" (RichGains featuring Freddie Gibbs, Nico Segal, and ZZ Ward)	2017	Gains	
"Loving You Loving Me" (Matt Koziol featuring ZZ Ward)	2022	Wildhorse (Barrel Aged)	

== Music videos ==
List of music videos, showing year released and directors
Title	Year	Director(s)	Ref.
"Better Off Dead"	2011	Unknown	
"Overdue"	2012	Unknown	
"Til the Casket Drops (Pretty Little Liars Version)"	2012	Unknown	
"Put the Gun Down"	2012	Alex Bulkley	
"Criminal"	2013	The Engine	
"365 Days"	2013	Roman & Pedro	
"Last Love Song"	2014	Joseph Toman	
"Last Love Song (Pretty Little Liars Version)"	2014	Joseph Toman	
"Love 3x"	2015	MIE	
"Hold My Heart"	2016	Sherif Higazy	
"The Deep"	2017	Kyle Cogan	
"Help Me Mama"	2017	Kyle Cogan	
"Ride"	2017	Declan Whitebloom	
"Cannonball"	2017	Kyle Cogan	
"Sex & Stardust"	2020	Alexa Kinigopoulos & Stephen Kinigopoulos	
"Break Her Heart"	2020	Alexa Kinigopoulos & Stephen Kinigopoulos	
"The Dark"	2020	Alexa Kinigopoulos & Stephen Kinigopoulos	
"Giant"	2020	David Dutton	
"Tin Cups"	2022	Nayip Ramos	
"Baby Don't"	2023	Adam William Ward	
"Ride or Die"	2023	Adam William Ward	
"Forget About Us"	2023	Adam William Ward	
"On One"	2023	Adam William Ward	
"Dirty Shine"	2023	Adam William Ward	
"Mother"	2024	Adam William Ward	
"My Baby Left Me"	2024	Adam William Ward	
"Love Alive"	2025	Adam William Ward	
"Liberation"	2025	Adam William Ward	

== Other appearances ==
=== Usage on visual media ===
List of TV, movie soundtracks, and other media appearances
Title	TV	Film/Other	Note	Ref.
"365 Days"	The View, Opening Theme Song; ABC (2013); The Vineyard, Season 1, Episode 1; ABC Family (2013); Chicago Fire, Season 2, Episode 5; NBC (2013)	No	None	
"Blue Eyes Blind"	Degrassi: The Next Generation, Season 13, Episode 35 (2014); Girlfriends' Guide to Divorce, Season 2, Episode 1; Bravo (2015)	No	None	
"Cannonball"	Workin' Moms, Season 2, Episode 3; CBC (2018)	No	None	
"Charlie Ain't Home"	Single Ladies, Season 3, Episode 5; VH1 (2014); Justified, Season 5, Episode 10; FX (2014)	No	None	
"Criminal"	Reckless, Season 1, Episode 1; CBS (2014)	Veronica Mars (2014)	None	
"Dead or Alive"	High Potential, Season 1, Episode 11; ABC (2025)	No	None	
"Ghost"	Riverdale, Season 2, Episode 4; The CW (2017)	No	None	
"Giant"	Love Island UK, Season 8, Episode 4; ITV2 (2022)	No	None	
"Got It Bad"	Ironside, Season 1; NBC (2013)	No	None	
"Home"	The Vineyard, Season 1, Episode 7; ABC Family (2013)	No	None	
"If I Could Be Her"	The Night Shift, Season 3, Episode 8; NBC (2016)	No	None	
"Last Love Song"	Pretty Little Liars, Summer 2014 promo; ABC Family (2014); The Vineyard, Season 1, Episode 8; ABC Family (2014)	No	A "Pretty Little Liars version" of the official music video was released with intermixed scenes from the season 4 of Pretty Little Liars.	
"Move Like U Stole It"	Awkward, Season 2, Episode 12; MTV (2012); Saving Hope, Season 1, Episode 1; CTV (2012); Chicago Fire, Season 2, Episode 5; NBC (2013); The Good Wife, Season 5 promo; CBS (2013); Shameless, Season 4, Episode 8; Showtime (2014); The Fosters, Season 2, Episode 17; ABC Family (2015); Guilt, Season 1, Episode 6; Freeform (2016)	No	None	
"OverdoZZe"	Riverdale, Season 1, Episode 6; The CW (2017)	No	None	
"Put the Gun Down"	The Client List, Season 2, Episode 1, 2; Lifetime (2012); Being Human, Season 4; Syfy (2014); Guilt, Season 1; Freeform (2016); American Woman, Season 1; Paramount Network (2018); Ginny & Georgia, Season 2, Episode 4; Netflix (2023)	We're the Millers (2013)	None	
"Ride"	No	Cars 3 (2017)	Written for the original soundtrack of the Disney/Pixar film Cars 3, and it was later included as a bonus track on Ward's second studio album, The Storm.	
"Runnin' Down A Dream"	NASCAR on NBC, Opening Theme Song (2018)	No	Cover of Tom Petty song from 1989 recorded for NBC only.	
"Sex & Stardust"	9-1-1: Lone Star, Season 1, Episode 2; Fox (2020)	No	None	
"Snakes"	Rebel, Season 1, Episode 7; ABC (2021)	The Sims 4 Vampires (2017)	First recorded on Simlish and used for The Sims 4 Vampires official soundtrack before its inclusion on Ward's 2024 extended play, Where Did All the Love Go?.	
"Til the Casket Drops"	Pretty Little Liars, Season 3 promo, ABC Family (2012)	No	A Pretty Little Liars music video was released as the official music video to promote the series third season.	
