= Mother (ZZ Ward EP) =

2024 EP by ZZ Ward

EP by ZZ Ward
- Released: October 4, 2024
- Genres: Blues; Blues rock
- Length: 16:33
- Labels: Dirty Shine; Sun Records
- Producer: Ryan Spraker

ZZ Ward chronology
| Where Did All the Love Go? (2024) | Mother (2024) | Liberation (2025) |

Singles from Mother
- 1. "Mother" Released: July 19, 2024; 2. "My Baby Left Me" Released: August 16, 2024

Mother is the fifth extended play (EP) by American Blues singer-songwriter ZZ Ward. It was released on October 4, 2024, via Dirty Shine, under exclusive license to Sun Records. It was promoted with two singles, the title track "Mother", which was released on July 19, and "My Baby Left Me" on August 16. The extended play was met with praise by music critics.

== Background and release ==
The extended play was executive produced by Ryan Spraker, and includes three covers, and three original songs, with two tracks being re-recordings from Ward's debut album, Til the Casket Drops, including a re-recording of her 2012 debut single "Put the Gun Down".

While interviewed by Grateful Web, Ward described the meaning behind the making of the EP.

“This EP is about coming back to who I am and the music I’ve always wanted to make. It’s a reflection of everything I’ve gone through and all the things I’ve been faced with—motherhood, self-discovery, and empowerment.”

— ZZ Ward on the meaning of Mother EP, for Grateful Web.

== Track listing ==
Mother track listing
| No. | Title | Lyrics | Producer | Length |
|---|---|---|---|---|
| 1. | "Mother" | ZZ Ward; Ryan Spraker | Ryan Spraker | 2:56 |
| 2. | "My Baby Left Me" | Arthur "Big Boy" Crudup | Spraker | 2:13 |
| 3. | "Put the Gun Down" (Dirty Sun Version) | Ward | Spraker | 3:04 |
| 4. | "I Have No One" | Big John Hamilton; Leroy Lloyd | Spraker | 2:33 |
| 5. | "Lil Darlin'" (Dirty Sun Version) | Ward; Nick Hennessey; Jonathan Keller; Richard Parry; Maceo Vidal-Haymes | Spraker | 3:25 |
| 6. | "Cadillac Man" | Tommy Minga | Spraker | 2:20 |
| Total length: | | | | 16:33 |

Notes

- "My Baby Left Me" is a cover of the 1950 single written by Arthur Crudup.
- "Put The Gun Down (Dirty Sun Version)" is a new version of Ward's 2012 debut single, which is included on her debut album, Til the Casket Drops.
- "I Have No One" is a cover of the 1968 single by Big John Hamilton.
- "Lil Darlin' (Dirty Sun Version)" is a new version of the song included on Ward's debut album, Til the Casket Drops (2012).
- "Cadillac Man" is a cover of the song written by Tommy Minga and recorded and released by The Jesters in 1966.

== Critical reception ==
Professional ratings
Review scores
| Source | Rating |
|---|---|
| Blues Rock Reviews | 8.5/10 |
| Tinnist | Positive' |
| Music News | Positive |
| V.13 Media | Positive |

Upon release, the extended play received critical acclaim from blues rock media outlets and music critics, with many praising Ward's modern twist on blues, and her vocal performance.

Writing for Tinnitist, Darryl Sterdan dubbed the EP as a "love letter to the blues", describing the project as a "six-track collection [that] serves as a powerful reminder of [Ward] talent for blending genres, while also showcasing a more mature, reflective side of the artist." The site also named Mother their Album of the Week.

Moe Moore of Blues Rock Reviews praised the record, highlighting Ward's great vocal abilities, as well, the songwriting, and music arrangements. stating that: "each track is an enjoyable experience and leaves us wanting to hear even more of her material."

Staff of Music News praised the extended play, dubbing Mother as Ward’s "most personal and authentic collection yet, showcasing her growth as an artist and a person."

== Personnel ==
Credits adapted from Apple Music.

- ZZ Ward — vocals (all tracks), composer (tracks 1,3,5)
- Ryan Spraker — producer (all tracks), composer (track 1)
- Arthur "Big Boy" Crudup — composer (track 2)
- Jett Gallindo — mastering engineer (track 2)
- Big John Hamilton — composer (track 4)
- Leroy Loyd — composer (track 4)
- Nick Hennessey — composer (track 5)
- Jonathan Keller — composer (track 5)
- Richard Parry — composer (track 5)
- Maceo Vidal-Haymes — composer (track 5)
- Tommy Minga — composer (track 6)

== Charts ==
Chart performance for Mother EP
| Chart (2024) | Peak position |
|---|---|
| US Blues Albums (Billboard) | 7 |

== Release history ==
Release dates and formats for "Mother"
| Region | Date | Format | Label | Ref. |
|---|---|---|---|---|
| Various | 4 October 2024 | Digital download; streaming | Dirty Shine; Sun Records | |
