= Help Me Mama =

2017 song by ZZ Ward

Single by ZZ Ward

from the album The Storm
- Released: March 31, 2017
- Genre: Blues rock
- Length: 3:06
- Label: Hollywood Records
- Composers: ZZ Ward; Evan Bogart; Theron Feemster; Priscilla Renea
- Producer: Theron Feemster

ZZ Ward singles chronology
"The Deep" (2017)	"Help Me Mama" (2017)	"Ride" (2017)

Music video
- "Help Me Mama" on YouTube

"Help Me Mama" is a song by American blues singer-songwriter ZZ Ward, released as the lead single from Ward's second studio album The Storm. The song was released on March 31, 2017 via Hollywood Records. The single peaked at 18 on the Billboard Adult Alternative Airplay chart in the United States, becoming Ward's fourth top 20 single.

== Composition and release ==
"Help Me Mama" was composed by ZZ Ward, Evan Bogart, Priscilla Renea, and Theron Feemster, with the latter serving as the song producer. Ward said to Nylon magazine, about the meaning of the song:

"["Help Me Mama"] is a song about when your momma can't help you anymore, and you gotta figure your stuff out on your own!"

— ZZ Ward, speaking with Nylon on the song.

Martine Ehrenclou of Rock and Blues Muse described the production as "a song that draws from R&B, gospel, and Indie styles". The Joy of Violent Movement noticed that the production featured a "strummed acoustic guitar, tweeter and woofer rocking low end, twinkling piano, whirring synths and electronics".

The song was officially released on March 31, 2017. To promote the track, Ward performed the song live at Good Morning America on July 3, 2017. She also performed the song on special sessions for Paste Magazine, Nylon, among others.

== Reception ==
"Help Me Mama" received generally positive reviews from music critics. While reviewing The Storm, Martine Ehrenclou of Rock and Blues Muse named it a highlight from the album, saying it "is a rocker of a song". Pete Francis of Blues Rock Reviews also selected the song among the album highlights, and dubbed it "The Big Hit" of the record.

Hafeezah Nazim of Nylon, highlighted the song from the setlist of Ward's performance at the magazine SoHo office, stating that the single "will help you get your life together". Pablo Gorondi of Associated Press, described it as "a fiery plea". While The Joy of Violent Movement called it "a strutting and swaggering track that pairs Ward’s powerhouse and soulful vocals", and predicted that the song "will further cement Ward’s reputation for crafting deeply personal, sultry and anthemic pop with a blues meets hip-hop swagger."

== Music video ==
The official music video for "Help Me Mama" was released on May 18, 2017. The video was directed by Kyle Cogan.

== Personnel ==
Credits adapted from Apple Music.

- ZZ Ward — vocals, performer, composer
- Theron Feemster — producer, engineer, piano, keyboards, drum programming
- Evan Bogart — composer
- Priscilla Renea — composer
- Chris Gehringer — performer, mastering engineer
- Erik D. Walls — guitar
- Kyle Mann — engineer
- Paul Redel — engineer
- Rich Costey — mixing engineer
- Martin Cooke — assistant mixing engineer, assistant recording engineer
- Nicolas Fournier — assistant mixing engineer, assistant recording engineer

== Charts ==
Chart performance for "Help Me Mama"
Chart (2017)	Peak position
US Adult Alternative Airplay (Billboard)	18

== Release history ==
Release dates and formats for "Help Me Mama"
Region	Date	Format	Label	Ref.
Various	31 March 2017	Digital download; streaming	Hollywood Records	
