= Cannonball (ZZ Ward song) =

Single by ZZ Ward featuring Fantastic Negrito

from the album The Storm
- Released: May 26, 2017
- Genre: Blues rock
- Length: 3:58
- Label: Hollywood
- Songwriters: ZZ Ward; Fantastic Negrito
- Producer: Blended Babies

ZZ Ward singles chronology
"Ride" (2017)	"Cannonball" (2017)	"Domino" (2017)

Fantastic Negrito singles chronology
"An Honest Man" (2015)	"Cannonball" (2017)	"Push Back" (2017)

Music video
- "Cannonball" on YouTube

"Cannonball" is a song by American blues singer-songwriter ZZ Ward, featuring fellow American singer-songwriter Fantastic Negrito. It was released on May 26, 2017 via Hollywood Records as the second single from Ward's sophomore studio album The Storm. An acoustic version was released as a single on November 3, 2017.

== Composition and release ==
"Cannonball" was written by ZZ Ward and Fantastic Negrito and produced by Blended Babies. The song features vocals from both artists, with Ward also contributing harmonica and guitar. Musically, it blends blues rock with contemporary production, which Strange Storystellar described as "bluesy," adding that it tells the story of "a messy, toxic relationship."

In an interview with Refinery29, Ward explained that the song was inspired by the emotional difficulty of leaving an unhealthy relationship. She said the lyrics explore the fear of walking away from someone despite knowing the relationship is harmful, and the tendency to remain because of the pain associated with separation.

"It was that feeling of being too scared to walk away from someone because you don't want to feel the pain of not being with them. It's that thing where you keep turning around, and you feel better when you're with them, and you don't want to face that pain of not being with them so you keep hanging on. That's kind of where 'Cannonball' came from."

— Ward on what inspired "Cannonball", via Refinery29

The track was released on May 26, 2017, as the second single from Ward's second studio album, The Storm on which it appears as the second track. It peaked at number twenty-five on the Billboard Adult Alternative Airplay chart in the United States, becoming Ward's sixth top-40 hit on the chart and Negrito's first.

== Promotion ==
=== Live performance ===
The duo performed "Cannonball" live together for the first time on Late Night with Seth Meyers on October 23, 2017. Ward later performed the song as a solo artist during an appearance on Lightning 100, as well as at Times Square for ABC News.

=== Music video ===
An official music video directed by Kyle Cogan, premiered on July 2, 2017. Filmed in black and white, the video features Ward and Fantastic Negrito performing together in an industrial warehouse, intercut with close-up shots that emphasize the emotional intensity of their performances. To promote the acoustic version of the song, a second performance video was released on November 3, 2017. Set in a recording studio, the video features Ward, Fantastic Negrito, and Ward's backing band performing a stripped-down arrangement of "Cannonball."

== Reception ==
Strange Storyteller dubbed the track as "Ward’s true comeback" since the release of her debut album. The publication praised the song's blues-inspired sound, highlighting Ward's vocal performance, which it said "soar[s] and whine[s] over the music," and Fantastic Negrito's "deep, rough growl of a voice." The review also commended the song's bridge, describing its instrumental section as "killer" and praising the interplay between the harmonica and electric guitar. Concluding on a positive note, stating that the track "deserves to be big."

== Use in media ==
- "Cannonball" was featured on the second season of CBC's comedy series Workin' Moms on the third episode, titled "The Sign".

== Track listing ==
- Digital download / streaming – Single
1. "Cannonball" (featuring Fantastic Negrito) – 3:58
- Digital download / streaming – Acoustic
1. "Cannonball" (featuring Fantastic Negrito) [Acoustic] – 4:38

== Personnel ==
Credits were adapted from Tidal.

- ZZ Ward — vocals, composer, lyricist, engineer, harmonica, guitar (Note: Credited as Zsuzsanna Ward.)
- Fantastic Negrito — featured artist, composer, lyricist (Note: Credited as Xavier Dphrepaulezz.)
- Blended Babies — producer
- Jonathan Keller — altovocalist, drum kit, engineer, guitar, percussion, programmer
- Rich Parry — drum kit, engineer, percussion, programmer
- Jabari Tawiah — engineer
- Rich Costey — mixing engineer
- Martin Cooke — recording, second engineer
- Nicolas Fournier — recording, second engineer

== Charts ==
Chart performance for "Cannonball"
Chart (2017)	Peak position
US Adult Alternative Airplay (Billboard)	25

== Release history ==
Release dates and formats for "Cannonball"
Region	Date	Format(s)	Label	Version	Ref.
Various	June 30, 2017	Digital download; streaming	Hollywood	Original	
Various	November 3, 2017	Digital download; streaming	Hollywood	Acoustic	
