= Save My Life =

Save My Life may refer to:

- "Save My Life", a 2023 song by Niall Horan from The Show
- "Save My Life", a 2003 song by Pink from Try This
- "Save My Life", a 2012 song by ZZ Ward from Til the Casket Drops
