= Liberation (ZZ Ward album) =

Studio album by ZZ Ward
- Released: March 14, 2025
- Genre: Blues rock
- Length: 41:12
- Label: Dirty Shine; Sun Records
- Producer: Ryan Spraker

ZZ Ward chronology
Mother (2024)	Liberation (2025)

Singles from Liberation
- 1. "Love Alive" Released: January 17, 2025; 2. "Naked in the Jungle" Released: February 14, 2025; 3. "Liberation" Released: March 14, 2025

Liberation is the fourth studio album by American blues singer-songwriter ZZ Ward. It was released on March 14, 2025, via Dirty Shine and Sun Records.

The album follows the release of Ward's third studio album Dirty Shine and extended play, Mother, and includes four out of six tracks from the EP. The album is produced by Ryan Spraker, who also produced Mother. To promote the album, Ward will embark in a new leg of her Dirty Sun Tour in March 2025.

"Love Alive" was released on January 17, as the lead single of Liberation, alongside its music video.

== Background and release ==
According Sun Records press release, the album is "a celebration of Ward's love of blues". The record includes both original songs, and some covers.

In an interview with Darryl Sterdan of Tinnitist, Ward said: “This is who I’ve always wanted to be — a blues artist, on my terms,” she continued. “It just took me a long time to get here.” Sterdan went to describe the record as a "fearless exploration of empowerment, authenticity, and self-discovery." he went further teasing some details about the album content, saying it was: "written during her journey through motherhood, the album finds Ward returning to her blues roots, reflecting the raw, unfiltered emotions of life’s trials and triumphs."

“I didn’t plan to make a blues album about motherhood, it just sort of happened naturally, I’ve always written to get through things in life. Suddenly, I was faced with a new job that’s 24/7 with no breaks, and that’s what I wrote about. But when you get tested, you discover who you are, and this album comes from a feeling of empowerment.”

— ZZ Ward on the making of Liberation.

== Critical reception ==
Professional ratings
Review scores
Source	Rating
Blues Rock Reviews	9/10 stars
B-Sides & Badlands	4/5 stars
Cryptic Rock	5/5 stars
The Wall Eye	4.5/5 stars
Mystic Sons	7/10 stars
Rock and Blues Muse	Positive
Return of Rock	Positive

Liberation was met with critical acclaim from blues rock media outlets and music critics alike, who deemed it as a triumphant rebirth from the singer to her blues roots.

Blues Rock Magazine awarded the album with a 9 out of an average rating of 10, with music critic Allan Claudio calling it "an amazing soundtrack to her life experiences". He also praised Ward's vocal performance, which Claudio described it as "filled with power and determination".

Shawn Donohue of Glide Magazine similarly praised the album and described it as "[it] finds the songstress rediscovering her love of the blues and delivering a stirring effort", and concluding that "While Ward is a music industry veteran, Liberation finds her re-energized, fully embracing her blues love while carving her own path forward."

Darryl Sterdan of the Tinnist selected the record as one of the "Albums Of The Week", applauding the album for its "aunthenticity and its sense of intrepid creativity" which results on "her truest and most blues-infused to date." He concluded that Liberation is "both a reclamation and a rebirth" of Ward's blues jorney.

York Calling critic Graeme Smith opined that Liberation is an "accomplished example of the [Blues] genre", dubbing it a "fiercely authentic" album. Writing for Indie Boulevard, Michael Filip Reed described Ward an artist that stands out thanks to her ability to remain true to herself, and said that Liberation "marks a milestone in Ward's career" highlighting its remarkable cohesive sound.

== Track listing ==
Track listing
No.	Title	Lyrics	Producer	Length
1.	"Mother"	ZZ Ward; Ryan Spraker	Ryan Spraker	2:56
2.	"My Baby Left Me"	Arthur "Big Boy" Crudup	Spraker	2:13
3.	"I Have No One"	Big John Hamilton; Leroy Lloyd	Spraker	2:33
4.	"Cadillac Man"	Tommy Minga	Spraker	2:20
5.	"Love Alive"	Ward	Spraker	3:27
6.	"Naked in the Jungle"	Ward; Spraker	Spraker	3:14
7.	"Liberation"	Ward; Spraker	Spraker	2:50
8.	"Lioness"	Ward; Spraker; David Brofi	Spraker	2:37
9.	"Grinnin' in Your Face"	Son House	Spraker	3:46
10.	"Dust My Broom"	Robert Johnson	Spraker	2:44
11.	"Sinner's Prayer"	Lloyd Glenn; Lowell Fulson	Spraker	3:11
12.	"Something You Got"	Chris Kenner; Fats Domino	Spraker	2:38
13.	"Clairvoyant"	Ward; Spraker; Brofi	Spraker	3:25
14.	"Next to You"	Ward; Spraker	Spraker	3:18
Total length:				41:12

Deluxe Edition tracklist
No.	Title	Lyrics	Producer(s)	Length
15.	"Nobody Knows You When You're Down And Out"	Jimmie Cox	Spraker	4:28
16.	"Halfway There"	Ward; Spraker	Spraker	3:06
17.	"Mother" (Eastwest Studios Session)	Ward	Spraker	3:03
18.	"Naked In The Jungle" (Eastwest Studios Session)	Ward; Spraker	Spraker	3:16
19.	"My Baby Left Me" (Eastwest Studios Session)	Crudup	Spraker	2:29
20.	"Dust My Broom" (Eastwest Studios Session)	Johnson	Spraker	2:47
21.	"Cadillac Man" (Sun Studios Session)	Minga	Spraker	3:22

Notes

- "My Baby Left Me" is a cover of the 1950 single written by Arthur Crudup.
- "I Have No One" is a cover of the 1968 single by Big John Hamilton.
- "Cadillac Man" is a cover of the song written by Tommy Minga and recorded and released by The Jesters in 1966.
- "Grinnin' In Your Face" is a cover of the song written and recorded by Son House, which Ward previously covered in 2013.
- "Dust My Broom" is a cover of the 1937 single by Robert Johnson.
- "Sinner's Prayer" is a cover of the 1995 song written by Lloyd Glenn and Lowell Fulson.
- "Something You Got" is a cover of the song written by Chris Kenner and recorded and recorded by Fats Domino in 1964.

== Personnel ==
- ZZ Ward – vocals, harmonica
- David Brofi – drums, percussion
- Cooper Nelson – tenor saxophone
- Russell Nygaard – trumpet
- Jay Jennings – trumpet
- Kevin Barry – lap steel
- Ryan Spraker – electric guitar, electric bass, double bass, piano, organ, production
- Riley Biederer – background vocals
- Patrick DiCenso – mixing
- Shawn Hatfield – mastering
- Jon Carr – title font
- Evan Kaufmann – cover artwork
- Tabita Pugh – packaging

== Release history ==
Release dates and formats for "Liberation"
Region	Date	Format	Label	Ref.
Various	14 March 2025	Digital download; streaming; CD	Sun Records	

== Charts ==
Chart performance for Liberation
Chart	Peak position
US Blues Albums (Billboard)	5
