= Til the Casket Drops =

Til the Casket Drops may refer to:

- Til the Casket Drops (Clipse album), 2009
- Til the Casket Drops (ZZ Ward album), 2012
