= The Storm (ZZ Ward album) =

Studio album by ZZ Ward
- Released: June 30, 2017
- Genre: Blues rock, hip hop
- Length: 36:13
- Label: Hollywood

ZZ Ward chronology
Love and War (2015)	The Storm (2017)	Dirty Shine (2023)

Singles from The Storm
- 1. "Help Me Mama" Released: March 31, 2017; 2. "Ride" Released: April 14, 2017; 3. "Cannonball" Released: May 26, 2017; 4. "Domino" Released: June 9, 2017

The Storm is the second studio album from American singer-songwriter ZZ Ward, released on Hollywood Records on June 30, 2017. The album reached number 1 on the Billboard Blues Albums chart.

== Production ==
Ward has said The Storm is influenced by the music of blues artists including Howlin' Wolf, Robert Johnson and Big Mama Thornton. Prior to the album's release, on March 2, 2017, Ward released the single "The Deep", featuring Chicago MC Joey Purp. The track is built around a sample of "As Long As I've Got You" by The Charmels, which is also sampled in "C.R.E.A.M." by Wu-Tang Clan. The track "Ride" featuring Gary Clark, Jr. was originally featured in the 2017 Pixar film Cars 3. Ward performed the song on Dancing with the Stars on April 17, 2017. The music video for the single "Cannonball" was released in July 2017; it features blues singer Fantastic Negrito, with Ward playing harmonica on the song.

== Track listing ==
All tracks are written by ZZ Ward. Additional writers are included below.

No.	Title	Writer(s)	Producer	Length
1.	"Ghost"	Evan Bogart, Trevor Brown, Warren "Oak" Felder, Zaire Koalo, Zsuzsanna Ward	Felder	3:00
2.	"Cannonball" (featuring Fantastic Negrito)	Xavier Dphrepaulezz, Ward	Blended Babies	3:58
3.	"Help Me Mama"	Bogart, Theron Feemster, Priscilla Renea, Ward	Feemster	3:06
4.	"The Storm"	Ward	Feemster	3:13
5.	"Domino" (featuring Fitz)	Feemster, Michael Fitzpatrick, Ward	Feemster, Fitzpatrick	2:50
6.	"Let It Burn"	Bogart, Brown, Felder, Koalo, Ward	Felder	3:08
7.	"Bag of Bones"	Ward	Feemster	3:17
8.	"She Ain't Me"	Ludwig Göransson, Ward	Göransson	2:51
9.	"If U Stayed"	Ward	Feemster	3:33
10.	"Hold On"	Bogart, Brown, Felder, Ward	Felder	3:12
11.	"Ride" (featuring Gary Clark Jr.) (bonus track)	Dave Bassett, Bogart, Ward	Bassett	4:05
Total length:				36:13

== Personnel ==
- ZZ Ward – vocals, guitars, harmonica, drum programming, percussion, engineering
- Trevor Brown – guitars, bass, background vocals
- Erick Walls – guitars
- Jonathan Keller – guitars, bass, drum programming, percussion, engineering
- Theron "Neff U" Feemster – piano, keyboards, guitars, drum programming, string arrangements, engineering
- Rich Parry – drum programming, percussion, engineering
- Gary Clark, Jr. – guitars
- Fantastic Negrito – vocals
- Michael Fitzpatrick – vocals, keyboards, drum programming, engineering
- Ludwig Göransson – programming, keyboards, guitars, bass, vocal engineering
- Bianca McClure – violin
- Thomas Drayton – bass
- Zaire Koalo – background vocals
- Warren "Oak" Felder – programming, engineering, background vocals
- E. Kidd Bogart – engineering, background vocals
- Jabari Tawiah – engineering
- Kyle Mann – engineering
- Paul Redel – engineering
- Gavin Paddock – engineering
- Bobby Holland – engineering
- Tyler Beans – engineering
- Rich Costey – mixing
- Neal Pogue – mixing
- Dave Bassett – mixing, vocal recording
- Chris Gehringer – mastering

== Chart history ==
Chart (2016)	Peak position
US Billboard 200	75
US Billboard Rock Albums	12
US Billboard Blues Albums	1
