= List of Hollywood Records artists =

This is a list of artists who have recorded for American record label Hollywood Records. Listed in parentheses are names of Hollywood Records-affiliated labels to which the artist may be signed.

== 0–9 ==
- 3rd Strike (disbanded, lead singer Jim Korthe deceased)

== A–E ==
- Alejandro Aranda (Scarypoolparty)
- Almost Monday (active)
- Alpha Rev
- Aly & AJ (active; briefly used the name 78violet)
- Allstar Weekend (disbanded)
- AREA21 (active)
- Bobby Andonov (BOBI)
- Apartment 26 (disbanded)
- Atreyu (active; with Spinefarm)
- Ballas Hough Band (active; with Morey Management)
- BBMak (disbanded, reformed in 2018)
- Big Kenny (signed to Love Everybody Records)
- Breaking Benjamin (active; with BMG)
- Brian May (active; with Queen)
- Jorge Blanco
- Butthole Surfers (active)
- Austin Butler (pursuing acting; was only signed to release music for Ruby & The Rockits)
- Sofia Carson (active)
- Caroline's Spine (active, with 7th Kid Entertainment)
- CB30
- Charizma & Peanut Butter Wolf (Hollywood BASIC)
- Cherri Bomb (active, signed with Hi or Hey Records as Hey Violet)
- Chris Pérez Band (moved to Univision Music Group)
- The Cheetah Girls (disbanded; members now performing solo or pursuing other interests)
- The Crosswalk (disbanded)
- Corbin Bleu (pursuing a career in acting)
- Sabrina Carpenter (active; with Island; also pursuing acting)
- Miley Cyrus (active; with Columbia; also pursuing acting)
- Danzig (active; with Evilive Records)
- Morris Day (active; unsigned)
- The Dead Milkmen (reunited; unsigned, but self-releasing material)
- Diffuser (active; with Chamberlain Records)
- Marié Digby (active; unsigned)
- DREAMERS
- Haylie Duff (active; pursuing her acting and writing career; never released her debut album due to conflict with label)
- Hilary Duff (active; with Atlantic Records; also pursuing acting and writing careers)
- Duran Duran (active; with Warner Bros. Records)
- Elefant (active; unsigned)
- Evans Blue (on hiatus; signed with Sounds + Sights Records)
- Everlife (active; with 97 Records)

== F–J ==
- Fashion Bomb (active; with Full Effect Records)
- Fastball (active; with Megaforce Records)
- Fishbone (active; with Ter A Terre Records)
- Jordan Fisher
- Freya Skye
- Flashlight Brown (inactive)
- Flipp (active)
- The Fluid (disbanded)
- Forever in Your Mind (inactive)
- Forty Foot Echo (active; with Echoman Records)
- Selena Gomez (active; with Interscope; also pursuing acting)
- Grace Potter and the Nocturnals
- Andy Grammer (active)
- Hi-C (Hollywood BASIC) (inactive)
- Honor Society (disbanded)
- Lucy Hale (pursuing acting)
- Laine Hardy
- Olivia Holt
- Vanessa Hudgens (pursuing acting career)
- Human Waste Project (disbanded)
- Indigo Girls (active; with IG Recordings/Vanguard Records)
- Ingram Hill (active; unsigned)
- In Real Life (disbanded)
- Insane Clown Posse (active; with Psychopathic Records)
- Into Another (active; with Revelation Records)
- Samantha Janus (pursuing acting career)
- Seu Jorge (active; with Cafuné Gravadora)
- Jonas Brothers (reunited; with Republic; members are also pursuing solo careers or and other interests)
- Joe Jonas (active; with DNCE, DNCE are signed to Republic)
- Coco Jones (active; with Def Jam; also pursuing acting)
- Joywave (active)

== K–P ==
- Josh Kelley (active; with MCA Nashville)
- Kenzie (active)
- Leftover Salmon (reunited; unsigned)
- Lifers Group (Hollywood BASIC)
- Little Image (active)
- Los Lobos
- Demi Lovato (active; with Island; also pursuing acting)
- Loudmouth (active)
- Adrian Lyles (active)
- Max and Harvey
- Anna Margaret (active; transferred to sister label Walt Disney Records)
- Jesse McCartney (active; with Blue Suit; also pursuing acting career)
- China Anne McClain (active; unsigned, pursuing acting career)
- McClain Sisters (active under the name Thriii; unsigned)
- JD McCrary
- Bridgit Mendler (active; with Black Box Music; also pursuing acting career)
- Idina Menzel (active; with Warner Bros. Records; also pursuing broadway and acting career)
- Freddie Mercury (deceased)
- Bea Miller (active; with Republic)
- The Minus 5 (active; with Yep Roc Records)
- Mitsou
- Myra (active; unsigned)
- New Hope Club (active)
- Nick Jonas & the Administration (Nick Jonas went solo, also pursuing an acting and modelling career)
- Nobody's Angel (disbanded; members have performed solo and pursued acting careers)
- Organized Konfusion (Hollywood BASIC)
- Hayden Panettiere (pursuing acting; started recording album but never released it)
- The Party (disbanded 1993; reassembled in 2013 independently as well releasing solo records)
- Regis Philbin (deceased)
- Plain White T's (active, with Fearless Records)
- Cole Plante
- The Polyphonic Spree (active; with Kirtland)
- Jordan Pruitt (active; unsigned)

== Q–Z ==
- Queen (active, for the U.S. and Canada)
- Queen + Paul Rodgers (US & Canada; disbanded)
- R5 (disbanded)
- Raw Fusion (Hollywood BASIC)
- Redlight King (active; now making and distributing own music)
- Rattlebone (disbanded)
- Raven-Symoné (pursuing acting career and talk show gigs)
- Calvin Richardson (active; signed to Shanachie Records)
- Jessica Riddle (changed name to Jessica Jacobs; unsigned)
- Nydia Rojas (on hiatus)
- Sacred Reich (active; with Metal Blade)
- Mauro Scocco (US) (1996-1999)
- The Scream (disbanded; lead singer John Corabi joined Mötley Crüe as their new frontman, and other members form DC-10)
- Seaweed (active; unsigned)
- The Brian Setzer Orchestra (active; signed to Surfdog Records)
- Shady Montage (active; now known as Shade Sheist)
- Simon Says (changed name to Key to Arson; then disbanded)
- Freya Skye (active)
- Sy Smith (with Lola Waxx Records)
- Sparta (on hiatus)
- Sprung Monkey (active; with Black Cat Do Records)
- Stryper (active; with Frontiers Records)
- Hudson Stone (active)
- Stefano Langone (active, unsigned)
- Sabrina Carpenter (active; with Island Records)
- Tina Sugandh (active; with Razor & Tie)
- The Suicide Machines (signed to SideOneDummy, disbanded 2006, reunited 2019)
- Jessica Sutta (active; with Premier League Music)
- TINI
- Bella Thorne (pursuing acting career)
- T-Ride (disbanded)
- Tricky (non-Europe; active)
- Tsar (active; unsigned)
- Alexa Vega (pursuing acting career; was only signed to release music for Ruby & The Rockits)
- Kyle Vincent (active)
- Yothu Yindi (USA; disbanded)
- Youngstown (disbanded)
- Z-Trip (active; with Hard Left Records)
- Zendaya (active, signed to Republic Records; pursuing acting career)
- ZZ Ward

== See also ==
- List of current Hollywood Records artists
- Lists of musicians
- Music of the United States
