= Perfectionist (album) =

Studio album by Natalia Kills
- Released: 1 April 2011
- Recorded: 2008–2011
- Studios: Cherrytree (Santa Monica, California) (Note: Tracks 1 and 7–9); American Dream (Note: Tracks 2, 4 and 10); The Hive (North Hollywood, California) (Note: Track 2); Enormous (Los Angeles, California) (Note: Tracks 3, 5, 12 and 13); Paradise (Hollywood, California) (Note: Tracks 6 and 11); 11th Street (Atlanta, Georgia) (Note: Track 7); Chalice (Hollywood, California); The Boom Boom Room (Burbank, California) (Note: Track 14)
- Genres: Electropop; synth-pop; dark pop
- Length: 50:21
- Labels: will.i.am; Cherrytree; KonLive; Interscope
- Producers: Akon; Jeff Bhasker; "The-Ron" Feemster; Fernando Garibay; Martin "Cherry Cherry Boom Boom" Kierszenbaum; Giorgio Tuinfort

Natalia Kills chronology
Womannequin (2008)	Perfectionist (2011)	Trouble (2013)

Singles from Perfectionist
- 1. "Mirrors" Released: 10 August 2010; 2. "Wonderland" Released: 12 April 2011; 3. "Free" Released: 24 June 2011; 4. "Kill My Boyfriend" Released: 10 January 2012

Perfectionist is the debut studio album by English singer-songwriter Natalia Kills. It was released on 1 April 2011 by Cherrytree Records and Interscope Records. The project marked Kills' transition from her early acting and bubblegum rap career into pop music. Convinced as a concept album, the record explores the psychological burdens of perfectionism, delving into themes of obsession, control, vanity and disillusionment. Sonically, the album features a blend of dark pop, electropop and synth-pop.

Production on the album was primarily handled by Fernando Garibay, Jeff Bhasker and Martin Kierszenbaum. Perfectionist received mixed reviews from critics, who asserted that the singer's visual projects were superior to her music. The album performed moderately on international record charts, reaching the top 50 in select European countries. In the United Kingdom and United States, the set attained chiefly low positions; in the latter, it had sold 14,000 copies as of September 2013.

The album spawned four singles—"Mirrors", "Wonderland", "Free" (featuring will.i.am) and "Kill My Boyfriend"—which were generally successful in Europe and were accompanied by music videos. "Mirrors" managed to peak within the top five of the US Hot Dance Club Songs. In association with Guillaume Doubet, Kills produced a web series titled Love, Kills xx in order to promote the album, based on her secret thoughts and desires. Consisting of 10 episodes, it features Kills seeking revenge and hurting men.

== Background ==
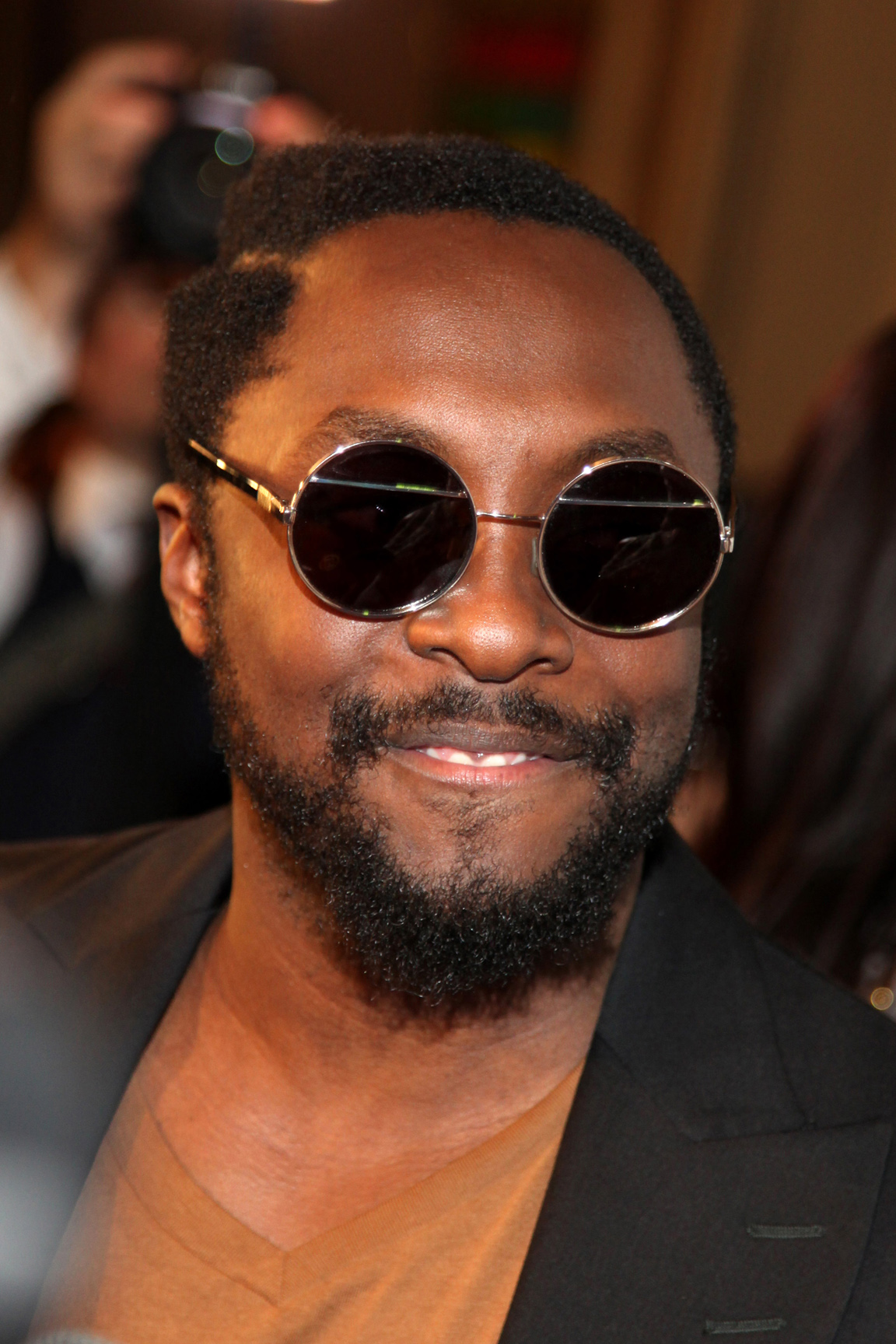
will.i.am, the album's co-executive producer, signed Kills in November 2008

Kills was introduced to singing and dancing at the age of 3, and until she was 12, she studied in the London Academy of Music and Dramatic Art. Kills initially pursued an acting career, appearing in some TV and radio series including All About Me and The Archers; however, in her hometown of Leeds, she developed an interest in hip hop music. She subsequently entered various rap battles, for which she started writing lyrics, and in 2003, Kills won a BBC Radio 1-sponsored "MC Battle". From there on, she began writing songs for artists and film soundtracks. Kills released her first single on 21 February 2005, titled "Don't Play Nice", under the moniker Verbalicious and with label All Around the World; it peaked at number 11 on the UK Singles Chart. She was also recording for her debut studio album, then-scheduled for an Easter 2006 release. However, the label entered bankruptcy, causing her record deal to be dissolved and the album shelved. Kills continued to work in the music industry, mainly as a songwriter with the alias of Verbz. In 2007, she relocated to Los Angeles; the next year, she lent guest vocals to French artist M. Pokora's song "They Talk Shit About Me", and changed her stage name to Natalia Cappuccini, under which she self-released an extended play (EP) titled Womannequin.

One of Kills' demos, "Shopaholic", was remixed by the Remix Artist Collective. After it was posted in American blogger Perez Hilton's blog, Kills' MySpace received a high number of views, and she reached the top of the social network's unsigned artists chart. While shopping, she was noticed by a man due to her clothing, and gave him her website address; he subsequently introduced her to a DJ, who took Kills to the American musician will.i.am's house. In November 2008, she signed a contract with the latter's record label, then an imprint of Interscope.

== Recording ==
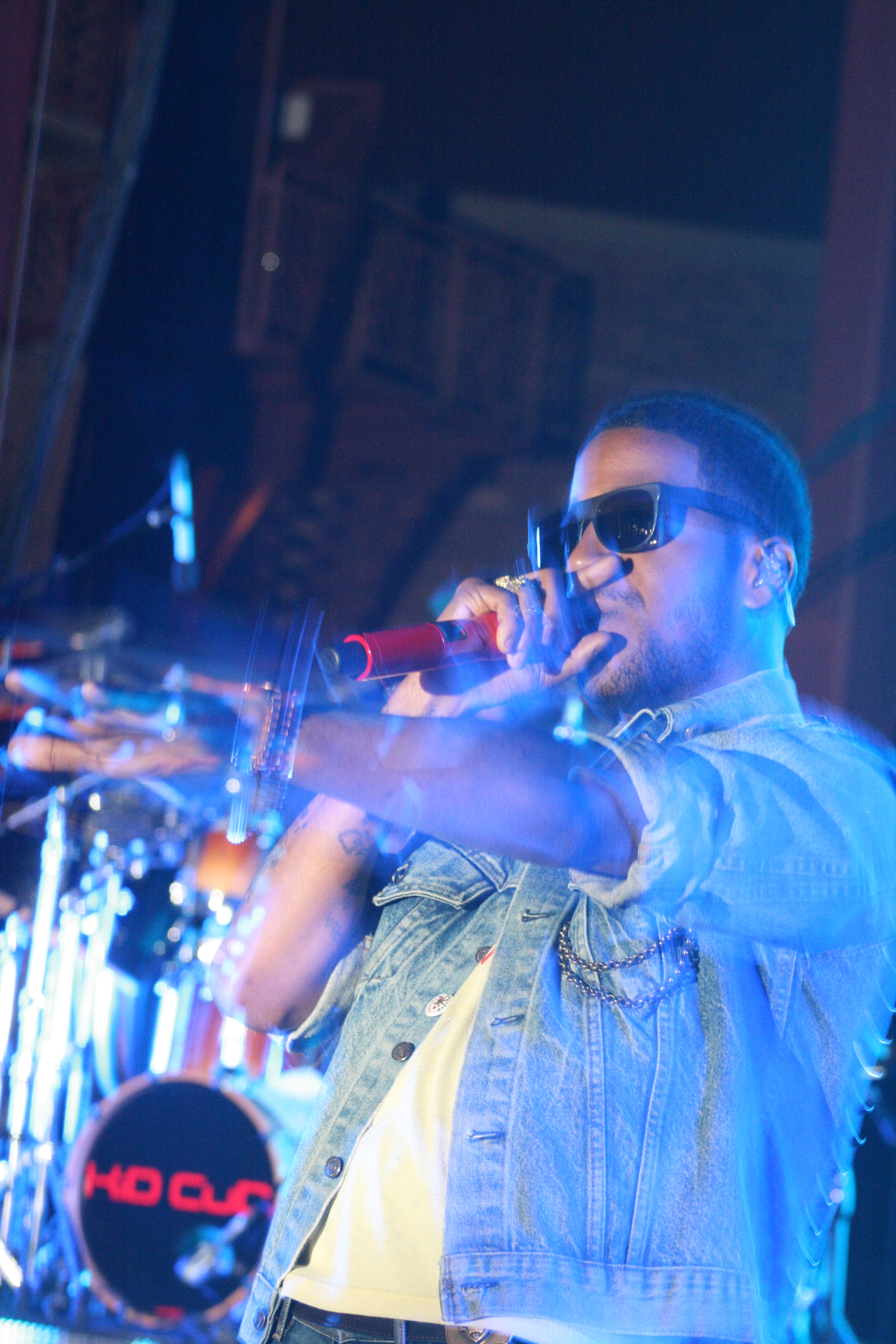
Kid Cudi co-wrote "Free"

Kills started to prepare material for Perfectionist after establishing her record deal with will.i.am, who served as an executive producer for the album. During the recording sessions, Kills prominently worked with producers Jeff Bhasker, Fernando Garibay, the album's second executive producer Martin Kierszenbaum, and Theron "The-Ron" Feemster. Akon and Giorgio Tuinfort co-produced "Mirrors" in collaboration with Kierszenbaum. Bhasker was responsible for the entire album's songwriting and engineering, and mixed "Zombie". Feemster and Tuinfort provided instrumentation, along with Zach Kasik, Carlos Keery-Fisher and Robert Horn. More artists including Robert Horn and Tony Ugyal were commissioned for engineering.

Most of Perfectionist's songs were recorded at Cherrytree Recording Studios or Enormous Studios; the latter served as the recording location for songs produced by Bhasker. "Break You Hard" and "Superficial" were produced at the American Dream, while "Wonderland" was produced at that studio and at The Hive. Kills recorded "Love Is a Suicide" and "Broke" at Paradise Studios, "Mirrors" at Chalice Recording Studios, and "If I Was God" at The Boom Boom Room.

Kills described working with will.i.am, "[...] it's almost difficult having a normal conversation with him because he's firing out ideas all the time. [...] His entire life revolves around creativity, and that's something I could really relate to." Kierszenbaum praised Kills' work ethic during the recording sessions, stating that she would focus simultaneously on the melodic and lyrical structure of song, as well as its soundscape. He went on to say that she "influenced the timbre of the sound" and assisted the production as if "she's making a movie."

== Composition ==
I'm sure everyone relates [to the idea of achieving perfection], but emotionally, I may be subject to the darker grasps of it—obsession, doubt, desperation.

— Kills to Elle

Perfectionist is a concept album which focusses on how perfectionism influences Kills. "All the songs revolve around my ambition, celebrations, frustration and disappointments of being a perfectionist", she stated. "I think we're all perfectionists – we're all looking for the best to fulfil our ideologies and dreams." Kills was also inspired by "women's obsession" with fashion in general. She described the album's sound as "dark pop" due to its "opinionated" and "confrontational" lyrics which, according to her, differ from mainstream music. The lyrical content is occasionally comical and uses metaphors frequently.

Perfectionist is an electropop and synth-pop album, characterised by "driving rhythm sections and edgy minor-key melodies". Its opening track, "Perfection", runs for thirty seconds and sees a "robotic-sounding" therapist listing Kills' flaws. "Wonderland", which fantasises about romance and a relationship's "perfect ending", includes synthesizer arrangements and choir sections; the line "Take me to wonderland" is repeated throughout the song. A track including a bassline, piano, club beats and synths, "Free" samples "Wuthering Heights" by Kate Bush. It was written by Kills when she worked as a waitress, and discusses "bailing on a budget". "Break You Hard" is an industrial pop song with "hypnotic rhythms", which talks about "breaking a lover", while "Zombie" incorporates electronic organs and "mumbling bass" in an electronic R&B sound.

"Love Is a Suicide" follows, detailing the "self-destruction" that comes with love, as Kills sings, "It's so surgical, how you dissect every mistake I make, you’re like an animal, you bite me hard". "Disco–pop" track "Mirrors" references sadomasochist sexual practices, while portraying Kills with a dominatrix-like persona; it contains electric guitars, and a bassline which Robert Copsey from Digital Spy compared to that of Eurythmics' "Sweet Dreams (Are Made of This)". The song's chorus features Kills singing in a falsetto note. Writing for Consequence of Sound, Alex Young opined that the song discusses "the duplicity of identity, hubris, and objectification". "Not in Love" is styled in electronica and influenced by acid house. AllMusic writer Jon O'Brien wrote that it "provides a welcome respite from the album's constant floor-filling leanings".

On "Acid Annie", Kills plots a revenge on an ex-boyfriend, while on the synthpop track "Superficial", she confronts her "consumptive impulses" and appreciation of "finer things." "Broke" sees Kills talking about money; "Nothing Lasts Forever" is a duet with Bhasker, who performs under the alias of Billy Kraven. It was noted by O'Connor for its prominent use of Auto-Tune. Perfectionist closes with "If I Was God", in which Kills asks her partner if he would love her if she were poor. For musicOMH, Blair Kelly likened its chorus' melody to that of Bush's "Running Up That Hill".

== Release and promotion ==
The cover art for Perfectionist, which depicts Kills sitting on an exam chair, with a red cross covering her eyes, was unveiled by Cherrytree on 11 March 2011. In Austria, Germany and Switzerland, the album was released by Universal Music as a CD and digital download on 1 April, while in Poland it was issued on 14 April. The US release proceeded on 16 August, as well as for Canada. That day, Kills performed songs from the album at the New York City-based building Atlas, accompanied by a keyboardist. On 19 September, it was released in the United Kingdom.

=== Singles and music videos ===
"Zombie" was selected as Perfectionist's first promotional single, and was released on 21 December 2009. Its music video, which features Kills being tortured in a laboratory, was released on 16 March of the following year. The song was used in the sixth episode of the first season of the Syfy reality television series Face Off, aired 2 March 2011. Despite not having been included in the album, "Activate My Heart" was released as its second promotional single on 13 April 2010, while an accompanying visual was uploaded on 17 December.

"Mirrors" was digitally released as the album's lead single on 10 August 2010, while a CD single was issued six months later in Germany. An accompanying music video was released on 1 December 2010, featuring Kills being dragged into a mirror and subsequently exploring the concepts of vanity, control and sex. The song charted. "Wonderland" followed as the second single from Perfectionist, and was available for purchase on 25 April 2011. It only charted in Austria and Germany, respectively at number 55 and 45. Doubet was commissioned to direct its music video, which sees Kills being forced into a mansion, being fed a cooked heart and ultimately climbing up a table, leading to chaos and violence inside the house.

Selected as the album's third single, a remix of "Free" with guest vocals from will.i.am, was released on 24 June 2011, with an accompanying visual being released ten days later. It obtained top 20 positions in Germany and Austria. A video for "Kill My Boyfriend" was released on 10 January 2012. It was filmed in France, and depicts Kills attempting to murder her boyfriend by drowning him in a tub of milk. Despite not having been released as a single, it peaked at number 19 on the Flanders Ultratip chart.

=== Love, Kills xx ===
To promote the album, a web series titled Love, Kills xx was written, produced and directed by Kills and Guillaume Doubet. The episodes feature the former as their protagonist; Akon, Far East Movement and Colette Carr appear as guests. According to Kills, the series are mostly devoid of dialogue in order to center on "emotion and action". She also said that the visuals were an "expression" of her secret thoughts, regrets and desires. Each episode contains an instrumental of a song from Perfectionist, and most videos contain narration from Kills.

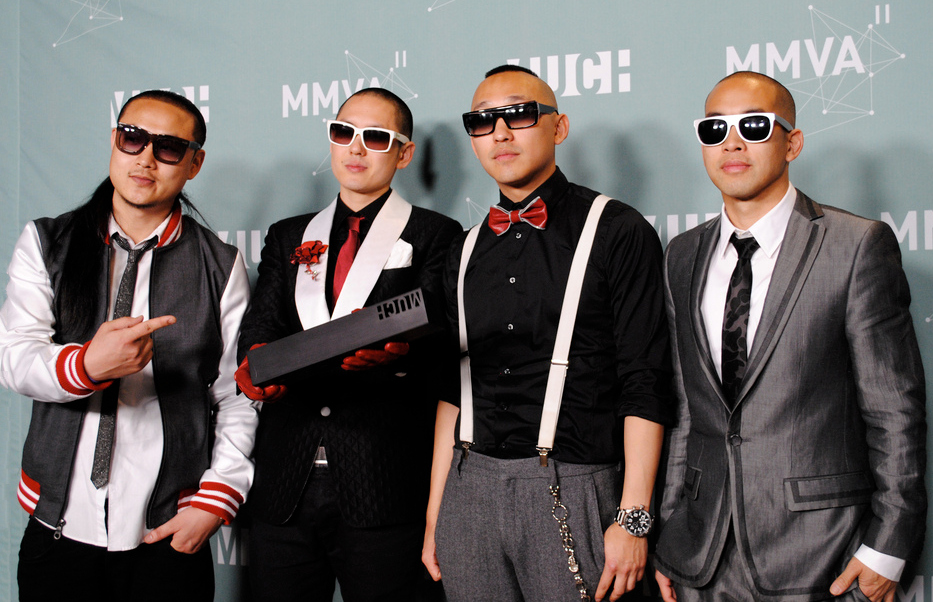
Far East Movement appear on the third episode of "Love, Kills xx"

The first episode starts with Kills furiously walking with a revolver in direction of a blonde man; she later ties him up on a bed, as he screams and tries to resist. Kills calls a friend whose name is not revealed, and asks him for help. During the second episode, Kills assassinates another man and takes his photograph; the next episode, she is arrested by a group—played by Far East Movement—who threaten her. She manages to strangle the leader of the group, and later leaves a message for her anonymous friend, warning him that her face is being distributed on wanted posters.

The fourth episode begins with Kills and a man involving in sexual activity. By the morning, the latter wakes up while Kills is asleep, and steals her passport and revolver. Kills is surprised to see that he has left and gets angry after realizing that she was robbed. During the 1970s exploitation film-inspired fifth episode, a victim of Kills denounces her to a detective, revealing that she left him in a desert. In the following episode, Kills runs over the man who robbed her two episodes earlier, with her convertible, and retrieves her passport. As the seventh webisode begins, Kills argues with her new boyfriend, who slaps her. Kills meets with him a week later, telling him that she's not angry, however she hits him with a baseball bat.

In the eighth episode, set in a hotel, Kills wins a checkers game between her and a man—played by Akon—who carries a black box; she exits the hotel carrying the box. The box, which contains a list of men names, is opened by Kills during the penultimate episode. She takes the list and crosses the name "Jeremy" off it. The camera shifts to a field where Kills makes a man jump from a cliff, by playing a game of "cold, warm and hot" with him. The last episode sees Kills and a friend of hers—interpreted by Carr—burning the car of the latter's boyfriend.

=== Tour ===
To further promote the album, Kills went on a 58-date promotional tour, starting from 24 June 2011 and concluding on 22 November 2011.

==== Tour dates ====
Date	City	Country	Venue
Europe
24 June 2011 ^{A}	Paris	France	Stade de France
25 June 2011 ^{A}	Paris	France	Stade de France
26 June 2011 ^{B}	London	England	Dance Village
28 June 2011 ^{A}	Düsseldorf	Germany	Esprit Arena
1 July 2011 ^{C}	London	England	Hyde Park
3 July 2011 ^{D}	Birmingham	England	O2 Academy Birmingham
11 July 2011 ^{D}	Manchester	England	O2 Apollo Manchester
13 July 2011 ^{D}	London	England	Hammersmith Apollo
North America
13 August 2011	New York City	United States	Webster Hall
17 August 2011	Miami	United States	Mansion
19 August 2011	Atlanta	United States	Masquerade Music Park
21 August 2011 ^{E}	Rosemont	United States	Allstate Arena
23 August 2011 ^{E}	Saint Paul	United States	Xcel Energy Center
26 August 2011	San Diego	United States	Hard Rock Hotel
28 August 2011	Hollywood	United States	Sunset Junction
1 September 2011 ^{E}	Guadalajara	Mexico	Telmex Auditorium
3 September 2011 ^{E}	Mexico City	Mexico	Palacio de los Deportes
5 September 2011 ^{E}	Monterrey	Mexico	Arena Monterrey
Europe
12 September 2011	Germany	Berlin	Lido
13 September 2011	Germany	Cologne	Luxor
14 September 2011	Germany	Hamburg	Knust
16 September 2011	Austria	Vienna	Szene Vienna
17 September 2011	Germany	Munich	Backstage Werk
20 September 2011	Switzerland	Zürich	Plaza
South America
25 September 2011 ^{E}	São Paulo	Brazil	Chacára do Jockey
27 September 2011 ^{E}	Buenos Aires	Argentina	Estadio G.E.B.A.
North America
12 October 2011 ^{F}	Ft. Lauderdale	United States	Culture Room
13 October 2011 ^{F}	Orlando	United States	Firestone Live
14 October 2011 ^{F}	Pensacola	United States	DeLuna Festival
16 October 2011 ^{F}	Anaheim	United States	House of Blues
18 October 2011 ^{F}	Salt Lake City	United States	In The Venue
19 October 2011 ^{F}	Denver	United States	The Gothic Theater
21 October 2011 ^{F}	Minneapolis	United States	Fine Line Music Cafè
22 October 2011 ^{F}	Chicago	United States	The Vic Theater
23 October 2011 ^{F}	Cincinnati	United States	The Mad Hatter
24 October 2011 ^{F}	Cleveland	United States	The Beachland
26 October 2011 ^{F}	Toronto	Canada	The Opera House
27 October 2011 ^{F}	Montreal	Canada	Club Soda
29 October 2011 ^{F}	Quebec City	Canada	Imperial
30 October 2011 ^{F}	Boston	United States	Royale
1 November 2011 ^{F}	Philadelphia	United States	Union Transfer
2 November 2011 ^{F}	Brooklyn	United States	Music Hall of Williamsburg
4 November 2011 ^{F}	New York City	United States	Webster Hall
5 November 2011 ^{F}	Washington, D.C.	United States	Black Cat
7 November 2011 ^{F}	Atlanta	United States	The Masquerade
9 November 2011 ^{F}	Houston	United States	Fitzgerald's
10 November 2011 ^{F}	Dallas	United States	Granada Theater
11 November 2011 ^{F}	Austin	United States	La Zona Rosa
12 November 2011 ^{F}	El Paso	United States	Tricky Falls
13 November 2011 ^{F}	Tempe	United States	Marquee Theater
15 November 2011 ^{F}	Pomona	United States	Glass House
16 November 2011 ^{F}	Los Angeles	United States	The Wiltern
17 November 2011 ^{F}	San Diego	United States	SOMA
18 November 2011 ^{F}	Ventura	United States	Ventura Theater
19 November 2011 ^{F}	San Francisco	United States	The Warfield
21 November 2011 ^{F}	Seattle	United States	Neptune
22 November 2011 ^{F}	Vancouver	Canada	Commodore Ballroom

- A Marked dates supporting The Black Eyed Peas on their The Beginning Massive Stadium Tour.
- B This concert was a part of the Glastonbury Festival 2011.
- C This concert was a part of the Wireless Festival 2011.
- D Marked dates supporting Kesha on her Get Sleazy Tour.
- E Marked dates supporting Katy Perry on her California Dreams Tour.
- F Marked dates supporting The Sounds on their 2011 tour.

== Reception ==
Professional ratings
Review scores
Source	Rating
AllMusic	3/5 stars
AltSounds	54%
Canoe.ca	3/5
Consequence of Sound	D
Digital Spy	4/5 stars
musicOMH	2/5 stars

Upon release, Perfectionist received mixed reviews from music critics. Jon O'Brien from AllMusic summarised it as "formulaic and gimmicky", and observed that the music was secondary to Kills' attempts of establishing a mature image. AltSounds staff member Jack Stevin deemed it "disappointing" and unfocused, writing that Kills was not in control of the album and that she had an "air of pretension around" her. Stevin additionally said that Kills was stronger as a "visual artist". Darryl Sterdan of Canoe.ca rated Perfectionist with three out of five points. Comparing it to the music of Lady Gaga, Kesha and Robyn, he opined, "Guess that's why it's not called Innovator." Writing for Consequence of Sound, Alex Young noted that Kills expressed herself better as a musician through music videos, and surmised that "not all the songs on Perfectionist hit their mark". Digital Spy's Lewis Corner described it as "finely tailored" and "exciting", and gave it four stars out of five. musicOMH writer Blair Kelly characterised the album as imperfect, "uninspired, unoriginal and obvious" while negatively comparing it to the works of American singer Lady Gaga.

In Europe, the album achieved moderate chart success. On the chart issue dated 1 October 2011, it entered the UK Albums Chart at number 129. In Austria and Canada, the album respectively reached number 35 and 36, while on the German and Swiss charts, it peaked at numbers 50 and 94. Perfectionist managed to top the US Heatseekers Albums chart and reach number six on the Dance/Electronic Albums chart, despite entering the main Billboard 200 chart at number 134. By August 2013, it had sold 14,000 copies in the United States. In Canada, the album reached number 36. Kills credited the success of the album and its singles with changing her life, commenting, "I had nowhere to live, [...] got on a plane to LA and then two years later I had sold over 800,000 singles. I wrote 14 songs and that's what happened? [...] I would never have thought this. I would have probably thought I was dead by now."

Kills discussed Perfectionist during 2013 interviews. She revealed that after having lived a deplorable life in London, her ambitions and dreams influenced the album's lyrics. "I was not as aware of... how I was", she stated. "I almost had a bit of fear where everybody wants to be loved, everybody wants to be understood in a way that's not full of judgment or blame. So I put all of myself into the album and then [kept] bits out." That year, Corner hailed Perfectionist as "one of the most underrated pop collections in recent memory", and Idolator's Sam Lansky opined that although it had "killer" choruses, the album suffered from excessive similarities to other artists.

== Track listing ==
No.	Title	Writer(s)	Producer(s)	Length
1.	"Perfection"	Natalia Kills	Martin "Cherry Cherry Boom Boom" Kierszenbaum	0:32
2.	"Wonderland"	Kills; Michael Warren; "The-Ron" Feemster	Feemster	3:31
3.	"Free"	Kills; Jeff Bhasker; Scott Mescudi; Dion Wilson	Bhasker; Dion "No I.D." Wilson^{[a]}	3:57
4.	"Break You Hard"	Kills; Feemster	Feemster	4:22
5.	"Zombie"	Kills; Bhasker	Bhasker	3:19
6.	"Love Is a Suicide"	Kills; Fernando Garibay; Warren	Garibay	3:57
7.	"Mirrors"	Kills; Kierszenbaum; Akon; Giorgio Tuinfort	Akon; Tuinfort; Kierszenbaum	3:16
8.	"Not in Love"	Kills; Kierszenbaum	Kierszenbaum	3:23
9.	"Acid Annie"	Kills; Kierszenbaum	Kierszenbaum	3:37
10.	"Superficial"	Kills; Feemster	Feemster	3:17
11.	"Broke"	Kills; Garibay; Warren	Garibay; Robert Orton^{[b]}; Kierszenbaum^{[b]}; Tony Ugyal^{[b]}	4:08
12.	"Heaven"	Kills; Bhasker	Bhasker	4:49
13.	"Nothing Lasts Forever" (featuring Billy Kraven)	Kills; Bhasker	Bhasker	3:30
14.	"If I Was God"	Kills; Feemster	Feemster	4:43

German iTunes Store bonus tracks
No.	Title	Length
15.	"Mirrors" (Live at The Cherrytree House)	3:45
16.	"Zombie" (Kleerup Remix)	4:02
17.	"Mirrors" (Tonka Dynamix Remix)	5:41
18.	"Mirrors" (Live at The Cherrytree House) (video)	3:47

US and Canadian edition
No.	Title	Length
1.	"Wonderland"	3:31
2.	"Free" (featuring will.i.am)	4:28
3.	"Break You Hard"	4:22
4.	"Zombie"	3:19
5.	"Love Is a Suicide"	3:57
6.	"Mirrors"	3:16
7.	"Acid Annie"	3:37
8.	"Superficial"	3:17
9.	"Broke"	4:08
10.	"If I Was God"	4:43

US and Canadian iTunes Store bonus track
No.	Title	Length
11.	"Free"	3:57

US and Canadian iTunes Store deluxe edition / UK edition
No.	Title	Writer(s)	Producer(s)	Length
1.	"Perfection"			0:32
2.	"Wonderland"			3:31
3.	"Free" (featuring will.i.am)			4:28
4.	"Kill My Boyfriend"	Kills; Junior Caldera; Julien Carret	Caldera; Carret; Kills; Tony Ugyal	3:31
5.	"Break You Hard"			4:22
6.	"Zombie"			3:19
7.	"Love Is a Suicide"			3:57
8.	"Mirrors"			3:16
9.	"Not in Love"			3:23
10.	"Acid Annie"			3:37
11.	"Superficial"			3:17
12.	"Broke"			4:08
13.	"Heaven"			4:49
14.	"Nothing Lasts Forever" (featuring Billy Kraven)			3:30
15.	"If I Was God"			4:43

iTunes Store bonus track
No.	Title	Length
16.	"Free"	3:57

=== Notes ===
- ^{^[a]} signifies a co-producer
- ^{^[b]} signifies a vocal producer

== Personnel ==
Credits adapted from the liner notes of Perfectionist.

=== Musicians ===
- Natalia Kills – vocals
- Dr. Orton – voice (track 1)
- Robert Horn – guitars (track 2)
- "The-Ron" Feemster – guitars (track 2); all other instruments (tracks 2, 4, 10, 14); background vocals (tracks 2, 10, 14)
- Carlos Keery-Fisher – guitars (tracks 4, 10)
- Zach Kasik – guitars (track 4)
- Giorgio Tuinfort – all instruments (track 7)
- Martin "Cherry Cherry Boom Boom" Kierszenbaum – all instruments (tracks 7–9); background vocals (track 8)
- Heather Kierszenbaum – 911 operator (track 9)
- Jeff Bhasker – vocals (track 13)
- Christopher Simila – background vocals (track 14)
- Kristle Simila – background vocals (track 14)

=== Technical ===
- Martin "Cherry Cherry Boom Boom" Kierszenbaum – production (tracks 1, 7–9); recording (track 1); vocal production (track 11); executive production
- Robert Orton – mixing (tracks 1–4, 6–14); vocal production (track 11)
- "The-Ron" Feemster – production (tracks 2, 4, 10, 14)
- Zach Kasik – recording (tracks 2, 4, 10, 14)
- Robert Horn – recording (track 2)
- Jeff Bhasker – production, recording (tracks 3, 5, 12, 13); mixing (track 5)
- Dion "No I.D." Wilson – co-production (track 3)
- Anthony Kilhoffer – recording (tracks 3, 13)
- Fernando Garibay – production, recording (tracks 6, 11)
- Akon – production (track 7)
- Giorgio Tuinfort – production (track 7)
- Mark "Exit" Goodchild – recording (track 7)
- Tony Ugyal – recording (tracks 7–9, 11); vocal production (track 11)
- Gene Grimaldi – mastering
- will.i.am – executive production

=== Artwork ===
- Lauren Dukoff – photography
- Julian Peploe Studio – art direction, design

== Charts ==
Chart (2011)	Peak position
Austrian Albums (Ö3 Austria)	35
Canadian Albums (Billboard)	36
German Albums (Offizielle Top 100)	50
Swiss Albums (Schweizer Hitparade)	94
UK Albums (OCC)	129
US Billboard 200	134
US Top Dance Albums (Billboard)	6
US Heatseekers Albums (Billboard)	1

== Release history ==
Region	Date	Format(s)	Edition	Label	Ref.
Austria	1 April 2011	CD; digital download	Standard	Universal	
France	1 April 2011	Digital download	Standard	Universal	
Germany	1 April 2011	CD; digital download	Standard	Universal	
Switzerland	1 April 2011	CD; digital download	Standard	Universal	
Poland	13 May 2011	CD	Standard	Universal	
Australia	9 August 2011	CD	Standard	Universal	
Canada	16 August 2011	CD	Standard	Universal	
Canada	16 August 2011	Digital download	Standard; deluxe	Universal	
United States	16 August 2011	CD	Standard	will.i.am; Cherrytree; KonLive; Interscope	
United States	16 August 2011	Digital download	Standard; deluxe	will.i.am; Cherrytree; KonLive; Interscope	
United Kingdom	19 September 2011	CD; digital download	Standard	Polydor	
