= Wonderland (Natalia Kills song) =

2011 single by Natalia Kills

Single by Natalia Kills

from the album Perfectionist
- Released: 12 April 2011
- Recorded: 2010
- Studio: American Dream; The Hive (North Hollywood, California)
- Genre: Synth-pop
- Length: 3:31
- Label: will.i.am; Cherrytree; Kon Live; Interscope
- Songwriters: Natalia Kills; Michael Warren; "The-Ron" Feemster
- Producer: "The-Ron" Feemster

Natalia Kills singles chronology
"Mirrors" (2010)	"Wonderland" (2011)	"Champagne Showers" (2011)

Music video
- "Wonderland" on YouTube

"Wonderland" is a song by English singer Natalia Kills from her debut studio album, Perfectionist (2011). Written by Kills, Michael Warren and "The-Ron" Feemster, and produced by Feemster, the song was released as the album's second single on 12 April 2011. It was featured in the 2011 romantic fantasy film Beastly.

== Composition and lyrics ==
Jon O'Brien of AllMusic described "Wonderland" as a "shimmering" synth-pop number, comparing its sound to songs from Lady Gaga's EP The Fame Monster (2009). Kills said of the message behind "Wonderland": "I really wanted to reject the ideologies of perfection and fairytales that we're conditioned to aspire to from a young age. If you believe in the 'happy ending' and count roses while you wait for a prince to save you it's only going to lead to extreme disappointment and pain when you get your heart broken and realize life is not always like that.

A review of the song, described the song: The lyrics seem to be very ambivalent about fairy tales both wanting to be taken to "wonderland" and then confessing that "I don't believe in fairy tales." There's an acknowledgement all through the song that life, like fairy tales is both beautiful and dangerous. There seems to be an understanding that the way society thinks about "fairytale relationships" is fake and worthless and real honest relationships are worth much more.

== Critical reception ==
Consequence of Sound picked "Wonderland" as one of the standout tracks, saying: "'Wonderland' denotes the pop perfection Kills was aiming for, complete with whimsical and fun lyrics ('Who needs true love/As long as you love me truly?', 'Will you wake me up boy/If I bite your poison apple?') and a catchy, original chorus." Digital Spy also selected the song as one of the best songs on the album, saying: 'Wonderland' is a fantasist's plea for the perfect ending, laced with theatrical choir sections and fairytale references. Star magazine described the song as: "moodily marvellous Wonderland, showed a strong, slightly menacing sense of self".

== Chart performance ==
"Wonderland" was released as the second single in Europe and the United States. The song reached a peak at number 55 in Austria and remained in the charts for 2 weeks. In Germany the song peaked at number 45 and stayed in the charts for one week.

== Music video ==
The music video for the song was made available on YouTube on 6 April 2011. The video starts with Kills being dragged by soldiers up the stairs of a mansion. This section of the video is intercut with images of armed police fighting with masked men. She is then forced to sit at a dining table with other women whose faces are half-covered with masks. She is served a cooked heart while the other women eat cupcakes with pills on them instead of sprinkles. They are watched by soldiers who stand on the floor above them. She then climbs up onto the table causing the soldiers to run down to her and grab her off the table. It then cuts to outside of the mansion where two soldiers are escorting Kills down the steps where her head is forced down and an executioner beheads her with an axe. Throughout the video Kills is shown singing the lyrics while leaning on a closed door. The video is intercut with text such as "Love is Pain", "Danger", "Lies" and the lyrics of the song. There are two versions of the video; a censored edit and the uncensored original cut.

Peter Robinson in the Guardian noted her appearances on a BBC sitcom The Archers and commented "Bizarrely she has now been taken under the wing of Will.i.am and rebranded as a sort of post-Gaga LA pop noir princess. It's all a bit silly and she can't carry the role very well but the broody electro songs – even when they sound a bit dated – are top stuff."

== Track listings ==
- US digital download
1. "Wonderland" – 3:31
- German CD single
1. "Wonderland" – 3:31
2. "Wonderland" (Release Yourself Club Remix) – 6:13
- German digital remix EP
1. "Wonderland" (Release Yourself Club Remix) – 6:13
2. "Wonderland" (Ladytron Remix) – 3:27
3. "Wonderland" (We Have Band Remix) – 4:22
4. "Wonderland" (video) – 4:02

== Personnel ==
- Natalia Kills – vocals
- "The-Ron" Feemster – producer, guitar, instrumentation, backing vocals
- Robert Horn – engineer, guitar
- Zach Kasik – engineer
- Rrlytox – mixing

== Charts ==
Chart performance for "Wonderland"
Chart (2011)	Peak position
Austria (Ö3 Austria Top 40)	55
Germany (GfK)	45
Poland (ZPAV)	5
Slovakia (IFPI)	93

== Release history ==
Release dates and formats for "Wonderland"
Region	Date	Format	Label
United States	12 April 2011	Digital download	Interscope
Germany	3 June 2011	CD single; digital download	Interscope
United Kingdom	28 July 2011	Digital download	Interscope
