= Love Alive =

- Single art cover

Single by ZZ Ward

from the album Liberation
- Released: January 17, 2025
- Genre: Blues
- Label: Sun
- Songwriter: Zsuzsanna Ward
- Producer: Ryan Spraker

ZZ Ward singles chronology
"My Baby Left Me" (2024)	"Love Alive" (2025)	"Naked in the Jungle" (2025)

Music video
- "Love Alive" on YouTube

"Love Alive" is a 2025 single by American singer-songwriter ZZ Ward. It was released in January 2025 by Sun Records as the lead single of Ward's fourth studio album, Liberation. "Love Alive" largely focuses on how having children can test a relationship, and attempting to prevent it from collapsing.

== Background ==
Ward had her first child with her husband, E. Kidd Bogart in February 2021. Two years later, Ward announced that she was expecting her second child. Ward has described having kids as "a sudden 24/7 job with no breaks," but also stating that during these tests is when on finds themself.

"Love Alive", along with Ward's album Liberation heavily features themes of motherhood and relationships. In a statement by Sun Records, Ward stated that she "didn't plan to make a blues album about motherhood, it just sort of happened naturally."

== Composition ==
"Love Alive" features several elements of classic blues including prominent hand claps, guitar, deep drums, bass, and vocals.

The song's lyrics are written from a first-person perspective about a relationship experiencing troubles during parenthood as Ward tries to revitalize the relationship.

== Credits and personnel ==
=== Personnel ===
- Zsuzsanna Ward – performer, writer
- Ryan Spraker – producer

=== Music video ===
- Adam William Ward – producer, director
- David Lee – photography director
