= Ride (ZZ Ward song) =

Single by ZZ Ward featuring Gary Clark Jr.

from the album Cars 3 (Original Motion Picture Soundtrack) and The Storm
- Released: April 14, 2017
- Genre: Blues rock; rock
- Length: 4:04
- Label: Walt Disney
- Songwriters: ZZ Ward; Evan Bogart; Dave Bassett
- Producer: Dave Bassett

ZZ Ward singles chronology
"Help Me Mama" (2017)	"Ride" (2017)	"Cannonball" (2017)

Gary Clark Jr. singles chronology
"Take Me Down" (2016)	"Ride" (2017)	"Come Together" (2017)

Music video
- "Ride" on YouTube

"Ride" is a song by American blues singer and songwriter ZZ Ward featuring guitarist Gary Clark Jr. The song was written for the original soundtrack of the Disney/Pixar film Cars 3, and it was released as the film lead single on April 14, 2017.

It was later included as a bonus track on Ward's second studio album, The Storm, which was released on June 30, 2017.

== Composition and release ==
The song was written by Ward, E. Kidd Bogart and Dave Bassett, with the latter also producing, and mixing the record, It also includes additional contributions from Chris Gehringer, who served as the master engineer. Critics defined the song as an up-tempo rock anthem. It was played during the film's end credits,

On May 18, 2017, it was announced that the song will be released with the album soundtrack and Randy Newman's original score. Ward later included the song as the last track of The Storm, her second studio album, which was released the same year.

== Promotion ==
To promote the song, Ward performed the song live on Dancing with the Stars on April 17, 2017.

A music video for the song, which includes footage of the film, was released on Disney's YouTube and Vevo page, on June 16, 2017, the same day that the film, soundtrack and score were released. As of July 2026, it has received 19 million views on YouTube.

On July 21, 2017, Disney/Pixar released a Spanish version of the song titled "A Rodar", performed by indie rock band Hinds.

== Reception ==
"Ride" was met with critical praise from music critics, whose praised the song music production and ZZ Ward and Gary Clark Jr. performances.

Writing for Laughing Place, Marshal Knight compared positively the song to "Life is a Highway" from the film first soundtrack, stating that the song "does a pretty great job recreating that same energy of that blockbuster track from the first film" He continued praising Ward vocal performance for "bringing the fun to the song", and the catchiness of Clark Jr. guitar solo as he described it as "something you will be humming for weeks". Kevin Wierzbicki of antiMusic described the song as a "carefree and slightly careless joy ride".

While reviewing Ward's album The Storm, Pete Francis of Blues Rock Review described it as "upbeat", and named it one of the highlights tracks of the record. Pablo Gorondi from Associated Press dubbed the song as thumping, and said that it serves it purpose of ending the closing credits "in fine fashion" while highlighting Clark Jr. "gritty" guitar solo. Stephen Thomas Erlewine of AllMusic called the song "impressive" and praised Ward's bold performance and versality, while comparing the song sound as a "stomping Black Keys rock".

Pete Sargeant from Just Listen To This Ride called the song a "fun piece" and praised the song production: "the rickety chorus sits over a riff-repeat that will stay in your head." He went further praising Clark Jr. performance, he "rides out on electric guitar, each note bursting with feel"

On December 18, "Ride" was shortlisted for Best Original Song at the 90th Academy Awards, though it was ultimately not nominated.

== Personnel ==
Credis adapted from Apple Music.

- ZZ Ward — vocals, songwriting
- Gary Clark Jr. — guitarist, background vocals
- E. Kidd Bogart — songwriting
- Dave Bassett — producer, songwriting, mixing engineer
- Chris Gehringer — mastering engineer

== Release history ==
Release dates, versions and formats for "Ride"
Region	Date	Version	Format	Label	Ref.
Various	April 14, 2017	Single	Digital download; streaming	Walt Disney; Hollywood Records	
Various	June 16, 2017	Cars 3 (Soundtrack)	LP; Digital download; streaming	Walt Disney; Hollywood Records	
Various	June 30, 2017	The Storm	LP; Digital download; streaming	Walt Disney; Hollywood Records	
Various	July 17, 2017	"A Rodar" (Hinds version)	Digital download; streaming	Walt Disney; Hollywood Records	
