= Cars 3 (soundtrack) =

Soundtrack album and film score

Cars 3 (Original Motion Picture Soundtrack) is the soundtrack album for the 2017 American computer-animated sports comedy-adventure film Cars 3 that features compilation of incorporated and original songs. The album was released by Walt Disney Records on June 16, 2017, coinciding with the film's theatrical release. A separate film score album, Cars 3 (Original Score), composed and conducted by Randy Newman, was also released by Walt Disney Records on the same date, also coinciding with the film's theatrical release. The film, directed by Brian Fee and produced by Pixar Animation Studios and Walt Disney Pictures, is the third installment of the Cars film series and the sequel to Cars 2 (2011). In May 2017, Walt Disney Records officially announced the release of two soundtracks: separately for the songs and score, unlike for the previous films, where both the songs and original scores by Newman and Michael Giacchino, had compiled into a single album. Fee said that both the score and the soundtrack "really help support the story we are telling".

The Japanese dub uses "Engine" by Tamio Okuda as its ending theme, which is about coming to a crossroads in one's life.

== Cars 3 (Original Motion Picture Soundtrack) ==
Cars 3 (Original Motion Picture Soundtrack)

Soundtrack album by Various Artists
- Released: May 28, 2017
- Genres: Western; country; pop
- Length: 28:40
- Label: Walt Disney
- Compilers: Tom MacDougall; Chris Montan

Singles from Cars 3 (Original Motion Picture Soundtrack)
- 1. "Ride" Released: April 14, 2017; 2. "Run That Race" Released: June 15, 2017

=== Background ===
Fee and Reher wanted a separate soundtrack, that contained the original and incorporated songs. The team worked with Tom MacDougall (who worked on soundtracks for Disney Animation films), for compiling the original songs along with Chris Montan. Lea DeLaria, who voiced for Mrs. Fritter in the film had also sang the jazz song "Freeway of Love". Various artists such as Andra Day, James Bay, Brad Paisley and Jorge Blanco had performed the tracks. Two original songs — "Run That Race", performed and written by Dan Auerbach and "Ride", performed by ZZ Ward featuring Gary Clark Jr. — were released as singles on April 14 and June 15, 2017. Auerbach who stated the song is "about never giving up and always trying your best", and further said that the filmmakers showed him the story and some dialogue, from which he pieced together a story for the song. Bustle's Johny Brayson reviewed that "With the Cars 3 soundtrack, the fast-paced franchise is once again proving that it's the most rockin' animated series around, and that's to be expected when your main character has a name as awesome as Lightning McQueen." Three of the songs, were featured in the "best musical moments of the Cars franchise" according to CinemaBlend.

=== Track listing ===
Cars 3 (Original Motion Picture Soundtrack) track listing
No.	Title	Writer(s)	Artist(s)	Length
1.	"Run That Race"	Dan Auerbach	Auerbach	2:43
2.	"Kings Highway"	Tom Petty	James Bay	3:07
3.	"Truckaroo"	Brad Paisley	Paisley	2:36
4.	"Thunder Hollow Breakdown"	Paisley	Paisley	4:49
5.	"Glory Days"	Bruce Springsteen	Andra Day	4:07
6.	"Ride"	Dave Bassett; E. Kidd Bogart; ZZ Ward	Ward; Clark Jr.	4:03
7.	"Drive My Car"	John Lennon; Paul McCartney	Jorge Blanco	2:42
8.	"Freeway of Love"	Jeffrey Cohen; Narada Michael Walden	Lea DeLaria	4:30
Total length:				28:43

=== Chart performance ===
Chart (2021)	Peak position
Australian Albums (ARIA)	18
UK Compilation Albums (OCC)	45
UK Soundtrack Albums (OCC)	23
US Billboard 200	19
US Independent Albums (Billboard)	6
US Soundtrack Albums (Billboard)	10

== Cars 3 (Original Score) ==
Cars 3 (Original Score)

Soundtrack album by Randy Newman
- Released: June 16, 2017
- Recorded: 2016–2017
- Studio: Sony Scoring Stage (Culver City, California)
- Genre: Classical
- Length: 50:15
- Label: Walt Disney
- Producer: Tom MacDougall

Randy Newman chronology
Monsters University (2013)	Cars 3 (2017)	Toy Story 4 (2019)

=== Development ===
The film's score was composed and conducted by Pixar's frequent collaborator, Randy Newman, who previously composed the first film's score. Tom MacDougall, Disney's executive vice-president of music, said that Newman has "a real connection to the Cars world" and that "His ability to capture the feelings on this film, its characters, locations, and the Americana theme throughout is extraordinary-the music is so naturally fluid and inspired. It really feels like Randy is coming home with this score." Newman quoted tracks from the first film in moments where Fee "wanted to evoke an earlier time".

For the score of Cars 3, both Fee and Reher wanted Newman to score as they wanted to "get back to the roots of the franchise". While approaching Newman, Fee wanted him not to score for the visuals, but for the emotional tone as well.

Newman spent more than two to three years writing the film's score, with the recording began in late March 2016 at the Sony Scoring Stage in Culver City, California. For the score, Newman had arranged a 104-piece orchestra — his largest ever till date, which Newman said "To make any mark in a picture where cars are racing 50% of the time, you have to make some noise". The score was split into three chunks and recorded over several months. According to Fee, in an interview with Variety, "Propelling the action is only one aspect of the assignment. Setting the tone and underlining the story's emotions are equally important. Randy can do Americana like no one else. But he has this magic ability to be incredibly emotional. He can play comedy, and then two beats later have you reaching for a tissue. You have an epic experience because of what Randy writes."

Newman reprised one of the themes from Cars, in the final 20 minutes of the film, while rest of the themes were newly composed, consisting of classical music. He stated that "It's a fairly mature premise about someone getting older and worried. It's a little less broad", as in the story, Lightning McQueen, no longer the world-champion racecar he once was, is trying to make a comeback.

=== Reception ===
Laughing Place's review summarised: "Randy Newman purists will delight that this release is all Randy from start to finish". James Southall of Movie Wave wrote: "Randy Newman's Pixar scores are so consistent in style and indeed quality, it's highly improbable that your reaction to Cars 3 will be much different from your reaction to the rest of them [...] it's so distinctive, so far removed from what everyone else does for these things, that despite its great consistency, it still feels fresh. It's not for everyone, but you know what you're going to get with one of these – and that's exactly what Newman has delivered." Jonathan Broxton of Movie Music UK, wrote "While it is unlikely to ever be considered a top-tier Pixar score, Cars 3 nevertheless has much more impressive musical content than one might have anticipated. The sense of fun and joy that Randy Newman brings to the project is infectious, the scope of the orchestral arrangements is impressive, and the action music is especially noteworthy; in fact, it comes close to rivaling his career best in that regard. Best of all, it's just so refreshing to hear such bold, unashamed, emotionally direct orchestral scoring coming out of a major film studio in 2017."

=== Track listing ===
All music is composed by Randy Newman.

Cars 3 (Original Score) track listing
No.	Title	Length
1.	"Storm's Winning Streak"	1:23
2.	"When All Your Friends are Gone / Crash"	3:44
3.	"Doc's Painful Demise"	1:25
4.	"Mater on the Horn"	0:29
5.	"Sistine Chapel on Wheels"	1:06
6.	"Temple of Rust-eze"	1:25
7.	"A Career on a Wall / Electronic Suit"	3:21
8.	"Drip Pan"	1:12
9.	"McQueen's Wild Ride"	2:05
10.	"Biggest Brand in Racing"	3:12
11.	"Fireball Beach"	2:16
12.	"Pull Over, Now! / Cruz's Racing Dreams"	2:00
13.	"1.2%"	1:21
14.	"If This Track Could Talk"	2:33
15.	"Letters About You"	2:02
16.	"Smokey Starts Training / A Blaze of Glory"	5:56
17.	"Starting Dead Last"	1:42
18.	"Flashback & Pit Stop"	3:32
19.	"Through the Pack"	3:42
20.	"Victory Lane"	3:51
21.	"The Fabulous Lightning McQueen"	2:11
Total length:		50:23

=== Charts ===
Chart (2021)	Peak position
UK Soundtrack Albums (OCC)	60
US Billboard 200	45
US Soundtrack Albums (Billboard)	40
