= The Vineyard (American TV series) =

- Genre: Docusoap
- Created by: Dave Broome; Brian Smith
- Country of origin: United States
- Original language: English
- No. of seasons: 1
- No. of episodes: 8

Production
- Executive producers: Andrew Perry; Brian Smith; Dave Broome; Noah Moskin; Yong Yam
- Running time: 42 minutes
- Production companies: 25/7 Productions; Big Moose

Original release
- Network: ABC Family
- Release: July 23 – September 10, 2013

The Vineyard is an American docusoap series that premiered on ABC Family on July 23, 2013. It chronicles the lives of eleven young adults who work together at The Black Dog restaurant and reside in a house on Martha's Vineyard. The first season consists of eight hour-long episodes, and was filmed from May to late June.

In March 2014, a spokesperson for the ABC Family show confirmed that the drama was cancelled by the network. There was no further comment.

== Cast ==
- Taelyr Robinson
- Sophi Alvarez
- Lou D'Agostino
- Katie Tardif
- Jon Franco
- Jackie Lyons
- Gabby LaPointe
- Emily Burns
- Daniel Lipshutz
- Cat Todd
- Ben Rossi
- Natasha Ponomaroff
- Sean O'Brien

== Episodes ==
| No. | Title | Original release date | Prod. code | U.S. viewers (millions) |
|---|---|---|---|---|
| 1 | "Welcome to the Black Dog House" | July 23, 2013 | 101 | 0.73 |
A group of "wash-ashores" arrives at Martha's Vineyard; Emily seeks a glamorous socialite of her very own; Ben shares a secret with Cat; Jon and Luis come to blows over Katie.
| 2 | "Loose Lips Sink Ships" | July 30, 2013 | 102 | 0.63 |
Jon pursues Katie despite warnings from Luis; Jackie decides to throw Luis a surprise birthday party; Sophi and Ben take a boat tour of the island; the relationship between Cat and her mother is further damaged.
| 3 | "Hook-ups and Let-Downs" | August 6, 2013 | 103 | 0.41 |
Jackie is crushed when she learns Luis may have feelings for Katie; Cat warns Sophi to stay away from Ben; Sophi works up the courage to sing in public; two housemates try to keep their budding romance a secret.
| 4 | "Romancing the Beach" | August 13, 2013 | 104 | 0.47 |
Katie's friend arrives for a visit; Taelyr and Cat discover that they have some things in common; Jon's parents arrive with news; Sophi makes a decision about her future; Katie and Luis talk about their feelings.
| 5 | "Player Beware" | August 20, 2013 | 105 | 0.46 |
Luis makes a surprise visit to Jackie's house; Emily and Jackie compare notes on Jon; Ben asks Gabby for a job; rivals develop a new understanding following an incident at a party.
| 6 | "Cat Fight" | August 27, 2013 | 106 | 0.57 |
Luis returns to the island just as Daniel plans a party to help launch Sophi's music career; Jon must work harder than usual to win back Emily; Cat believes Katie will hurt Luis.
| 7 | "Secret's Out" | September 3, 2013 | 107 | N/A |
Katie decides to tell Matt about her feelings for Luis; Sophi hides news about her unexpected relationship from her friends; Luis feels guilty about his one-night stand with Jackie.
| 8 | "For Love or Vineyard" | September 10, 2013 | 108 | 0.42 |
The Black Dog crew looks to the future as summer comes to a close; Cat must choose between romance or her career; Jon and Emily ponder their relationship; Luis makes a romantic gesture to Katie.
