= Put the Gun Down =

- Physical single artcover

Single by ZZ Ward

from the album Til the Casket Drops
- Released: July 12, 2012
- Genre: blue-eyed soul; pop soul; pop rock; blues
- Length: 2:20
- Label: Hollywood Records
- Songwriter: Zsuzsanna E. Ward
- Producer: Theron "Neff-U" Feemster

ZZ Ward singles chronology
"Put the Gun Down" (2012)	"Criminal" (2012)

"Put the Gun Down" is the 2012 debut single by American singer-songwriter ZZ Ward. It was ZZ Ward's first single with Hollywood Records. While the song was originally included on Ward's EP, Criminal, it was later included on her debut studio album Til the Casket Drops.

== Composition ==
"Put the Gun Down" was produced by Theron "Neff-U" Feemster, and was self-written by ZZ Ward, who described the lyrical content as "a woman trying to take [her] man from [her]". According the lyrics, the woman name is "Adeline", and she embodies the classic role of a 'home-wrecker'. Ward uses vivid imagery to tell the events of the song.

== Music video ==
The music video for "Put the Gun Down" was released on June 17, 2012. It was directed by Alexander Bulkley and produced by Jed Hathaway.

The music video shows Ward playing at a bar with her band, as she looks direct at a camera, while reversed shots of a romantic scene between a man and woman having an affair is playing in between scenes.

== Live performances ==
Ward performed the song live on The Tonight Show with Jay Leno in November 2012. She also performed the song live on an episode of VH1's Big Morning Buzz Live that same year. On January 10, 2013, Ward performed the song live as the musical guest on Conan.

She also did several acoustic live performances of the song on different studios, such as: Pandora Whiteboard Sessions, Lightning 100, NPR Live Sessions, at the Bumbershoot Music Lounge for KEXP, and live at the Troubadour.

== In popular culture ==
The song has been covered by other musicians and has been featured on several television series, and other types of media, like film. Some of its most notable uses and covers includes:

Covers

- "Put the Gun Down" was performed by Ashley Morgan and Mia Z on The Voice in 2015. Their performance was released by Republic Records in 2015 as a single.
- American actress & singer Lynda Carter covered the song on her 2018 studio album Red Rock N' Blues.

Other media

- "Put the Gun Down" was featured in the first two episodes of the second season of the Lifetime series The Client List in 2012.
- "Put the Gun Down" was featured in the 2013 black comedy film We're the Millers, directed by Rawson Marshall Thurber and starring Jennifer Aniston, Jason Sudeikis with Emma Roberts and Will Poulter.
- "Put the Gun Down" was featured in the fourth season of the Syfy fantasy series Being Human in 2014.
- "Put the Gun Down" was featured in the first season of the Freeform mystery drama series Guilt in 2016.
- "Put the Gun Down" was featured in the first season of the Paramount Network series American Woman in 2018.
- "Put the Gun Down" was featured in the second season of the Netflix original series Ginny & Georgia in 2023.

== Charts ==
Weekly chart performance for "Put the Gun Down"
Chart (2012–13)	Peak position
US Adult Alternative Airplay (Billboard)	7
US Alternative Airplay (Billboard)	39
US Rock & Alternative Airplay (Billboard)	43
