= Dirty Shine =

2023 album by ZZ Ward

Studio album by ZZ Ward
- Released: September 8, 2023
- Genre: Blues rock; hip-hop
- Length: 38:20
- Label: Dirty Shine Records
- Producer: Jameil Aossey; Dave Bassett; Mike Elizondo; Ludwig Göransson; Mark Jackson; Emanuel Kiriakou; Symbolyc One; Epikh Pro; Ian Scott; Ryan Spraker; Frederik Thaae; ZZ Ward

ZZ Ward chronology
The Storm (2017)	Dirty Shine (2023)	Where Did All the Love Go? (2024)

Singles from Dirty Shine
- 1. "Tin Cups" Released: October 14, 2022; 2. "Baby Don't" Released: March 24, 2023; 3. "Ride or Die" Released: May 3, 2023; 4. "Forget About Us" Released: June 16, 2023; 5. "On One" Released: July 28, 2023; 6. "Evil on the Inside" Released: October 13, 2023

Dirty Shine is the third studio album by American singer-songwriter ZZ Ward and her debut release through her independent label Dirty Shine Records. The album follows The Storm (2017) and features vocals from Aloe Blacc, Jean Deaux, and Vic Mensa. A deluxe edition named the Dirty Deluxe was released on November 17, 2023.

In promotion of the album, Ward embarked on her One Hell of a Night Tour.

== Background ==
As her first release as an independent artist, Ward wanted to be able to have complete control and freedom, saying that "you can get sidetracked trying to please other people, or label and what they want from you or what they see from you."

The phrase "dirty shine" means to be embrace your authentic self and while being dirty and rough around the edges. It was started when Ward released her first album Til the Casket Drops.

== Singles ==
The lead single, "Tin Cups" with Aloe Blacc, was released on October 14, 2022, with a music video released November 16. It is her first song in two years following "Giant" in 2020. Ward stated that "the addition of Aloe elevated this song and added depth that only an artist of his caliber can."

A second single, "Baby Don't" featuring DijahSB, was released March 10, 2023. A music video for the solo version of the song was released March 24. The video is part one of a series of videos written, directed, and produced by Adam William Ward.

The third single, "Ride or Die" featuring Vic Mensa, was released May 3, 2023. It is part two of the music video series.

The fourth single, "Forget About Us", was released June 16, 2023.

The fifth single, "On One" featuring Jean Deaux, was released July 28, 2023. The music video omits Deaux's verse and includes a solo verse from Ward. It is the finale of the music video series.

The sixth and final single, "Evil on the Inside" was released on October 13, 2023. It was included in the Dirty Deluxe edition of the album.

== Critical reception ==
Dirty Shine received widespread critical acclaim. Critics praised Ward's versatility in blending the blues rock and hip-hop genres and her overall performance. Pete Francis from Blues Rock Review called the album "different in a great way", giving it an 8.5/10. He also named "Ride Or Die", "Dead Or Alive", "Baby Don't", "Tin Cups", and "Don't Let Me Down" standout tracks.

== Track listing ==
Dirty Shine
No.	Title	Writer(s)	Producer(s)	Length
1.	"Welcome to Dirty Shine"	Carine Marie Lagenderfer; Jameil Aossey	Jameil Aossey	0:42
2.	"Ride or Die" (featuring Vic Mensa)	Zsuzsanna Ward; Victor Mensah; Eric Burdon; Bryan Chandler; Rodney LeMay; Alan Lomax; Lawrence Parker	Ward; Symbolyc One; Epikh Pro	3:51
3.	"Fadeaway"	Ward; Jameil Aossey; Evan Kidd Bogart; Larry Griffin, Jr.; Stuart Lowery	Jameil Aossey; Symbolyc One; Epikh Pro	3:46
4.	"On One" (featuring Jean Deaux)	Ward; Zoi Harris; Dave Bassett	Bassett	3:03
5.	"Slow Hum Hymnal"	Jameil Aossey	Jameil Aossey	1:07
6.	"Dead or Alive"	Ward; Bogart; Mike Elizondo	Elizondo	3:17
7.	"Forget About Us"	Ward; Mark Jackson; Ian Scott	Jackson; Scott	2:43
8.	"Friends Like These"	Ward; Bogart; Tom Peyton; Ryan Spraker; Frederik Thaae	Spraker; Thaae	3:28
9.	"Baby Don't"	Ward; Bogart; Jason Evigan; Kadijah Payne	Bassett	3:09
10.	"North Bank Blues"	Charles Ward, Jr.	Epikh Pro	0:42
11.	"OverdoZZe"	Ward; Ludwig Göransson	Göransson	3:16
12.	"Cut Me Loose"	Ward; Jameil Aossey; Bogart; Griffin, Jr.; Lowery	Jameil Aossey; Symbolyc One; Epikh Pro	3:02
13.	"Tin Cups" (with Aloe Blacc)	Ward; Bogart; Clarence Coffee, Jr.; Emanuel Kiriakou	Kiriakou	3:00
14.	"Don't Let Me Down"	Ward; Bogart	Bassett	3:08
Total length:				38:20

Digital Dirty Deluxe Edition
No.	Title	Writer(s)	Producer(s)	Length
15.	"Evil on the Inside"	Ward; Brock Berryhill; Bogart; Audra Mae	Bassett	3:31
16.	"The Mend"	Ward	Bassett	3:37
17.	"The Dark (Dirty Shine Mix)"	Ward; Bogart	Bassett	2:51
18.	"Ride or Die (Demo)"	Ward; Burdon; Chandler; LeMay; Lomax; Mensah; Parker		3:10
Total length:				51:30
