= Last Love Song =

- Remixes EP cover

Single by ZZ Ward

from the album 'Til the Casket Drops
- Released: February 13, 2014
- Studio: Boardwalk Records
- Genre: Soul
- Length: 3:31
- Label: Hollywood
- Songwriter: Zsuzsanna Eva Ward
- Producers: Ryan Tedder; Brent Kutzle

ZZ Ward singles chronology
"365 Days" (2013)	"Last Love Song" (2014)	"Love 3x" (2015)

Music video
- "Last Love Song" on YouTube

"Last Love Song" is a song by American blues singer-songwriter ZZ Ward, released as the third and final single from Ward's debut album, 'Til the Casket Drops.

An acoustic version was first included on her mixtape Eleven Roses to free download. Meanwhile, the studio version was initially released alongside her debut album in 2012, and it was later re-released in 2014 as part of an EP. "Last Love Song" reached number 15 on Billboard's US Adult Alternative Songs and 30 on the US Adult Pop Airplay.

== Background ==
While writing her debut album, many of Ward's songs were inspired by an ex-boyfriend. Ward wrote "Last Love Song" as a final love song to an ex-boyfriend, hoping to write no more love songs about him. The song was produced by OneRepublic's Ryan Tedder and Brent Kutzle. On April 1, 2014, four remixes of "Last Love Song" were released on an EP titled Last Love Song Remixes.

== Music video ==
The official music video for "Last Love Song" was released on April 25, 2014. The video was directed by Joseph Toman and stylized in black and white while filmed in San Francisco and Los Angeles. It features a seemingly melancholy Ward singing throughout a home and various locations in a city while remembering a past relationship.

A "Pretty Little Liars version" of the official music video was released one day prior with scenes from the official music video intermixed with scenes from the television series, Pretty Little Liars. This was part of a promotion for the series featuring "Last Love Song."

== Reception ==
While reviewing the 'Til the Casket Drops, Stone from The Couch Sessions commended Ward's vocal performance on the soul-ballad while also admiring the use of imagery associated with the classic American Dream.

== Use in media ==
- "Last Love Song" was featured in the Season 5 premiere of ABC's Pretty Little Liars.

== Track listing ==
Digital free download - Eleven Roses Mixtape version

1. "Last Love Song" (Acoustic) – 3:27

Digital download, streaming and physical - Til the Casket Drops version

1. "Last Love Song" – 3:31

Digital download and streaming - EP

1. "Last Love Song" (Tracy Young Ferosh Remix) – 6:07
2. "Last Love Song" (Dave Audé Club Remix) – 6:35
3. "Last Love Song" (Atlantic Connection Remix) – 4:20
4. "Last Love Song" (White Sea Remix) – 3:58

== Charts ==
Weekly chart performance for "Last Love Song"
Chart (2014)	Peak position
US Hot Rock & Alternative Songs (Billboard)	44
US Adult Pop Airplay (Billboard)	30
US Dance Club Songs (Billboard)	19
US Adult Alternative Airplay (Billboard)	15

== Release history ==
"Last Love Song" release history
Region	Date	Format(s)	Version	Label	Ref.
Various	November 3, 2011	Free download	Acoustic mixtape version	Self-released	
United States	October 16, 2012	CD, digital download	Studio album version	Hollywood Records	
Various	April 1, 2014	Digital download, streaming	Tracy Young Ferosh remix	Hollywood Records	
Various	April 1, 2014	Digital download, streaming	Dave Audé club remix	Hollywood Records	
Various	April 1, 2014	Digital download, streaming	Atlantic Connection remix	Hollywood Records	
Various	April 1, 2014	Digital download, streaming	White Sea remix	Hollywood Records	
