= Sex & Stardust =

Single by ZZ Ward
- Released: December 13, 2019
- Genre: R&B; pop; blues; rock
- Length: 3:07
- Label: Hollywood Records
- Songwriters: Zsuzsana Ward; Dave Bassett
- Producer: Dave Bassett

ZZ Ward singles chronology
"Domino" (2018)	"Sex & Stardust" (2019)	"Break Her Heart" (2020)

Music video
- "Sex & Stardust" on YouTube

"Sex & Stardust" is a song recorded by American blues singer-songwriter, ZZ Ward. It was released as a stand-alone single on December 13, 2019, via Hollywood Records. It was co-written by ZZ Ward and Dave Bassett, with Bassett also producing the song.

== Background ==
Ward wrote that the song was one that connected with her emotions while writing it, portraying a relationship going through troubles including heartbreak, betrayal, and cheating.

== Music video ==
The music video was originally released December 10, 2019, but was later re-released on January 24, 2023. The video was directed by Stephen Kinigopoulos and Alexa King.

Ward provided the main concept for the music video, stating that it took inspiration from the movie, Kill Bill. The video features Ward as an Uma Thurman-inspired character, and a man in a diner while it is being robbed. Together they methodically disarm the robbers, afterward being arrested themselves.

== Use in media ==
"Sex & Stardust" was featured on the second episode of the first season of Fox's hit series 9-1-1: Lone Star, which aired on January, 2020.

== Credits ==
Credits adapted from Apple Music.

- Zsuzsana Ward – performer, songwriter, acoustic guitar.
- Dave Bassett – producer, songwriter, acoustic guitar, background vocals, piano, mixing engineer, recording engineer, electric guitar, bass guitar, drums, percurssion, alto.
- Chris Gehringer – performer, mastering engineer.
