= The Jesters (R&B band) =

- Origin: Athens, GA
- Genres: Soul, R&B
- Years active: 1964–1970, 1982–2014

The Jesters were a white soul/R&B band in Athens, Georgia, United States, formed in 1964. They lasted 50 years. Among the acts they either toured with or opened for were Jerry Butler, Marvin Gaye, Patti LaBelle, The Marvellettes, The Platters and Jackie Wilson.

== Background ==
=== 1964 - 1970 ===
Along with Zodiacs and the Blue Blenders, they were one of the pop bands in the Athens area. They played Motown and Beach music which made them well suited to back up other touring acts such as Marvin Gaye, The Drifters and The Platters. The group was formed in 1964. In their early days they did venues like campus fraternity houses, rented halls and lounges and even a navy hall. They also played at the Georgian Hotel, Charlie Williams' Pinecrest Lodge. David Prince left the band in 1966 and joined a psychedelic band in Athens called October People. One of the venues they played in the late 1960s was the Shelby Teen Club in July 1968. Other groups to play there in that period were The Attractions, The Embers and The Monzas. Also in that year, they recorded an album that was made up of the rhythm and blues hits of the day.

The group broke up in 1970.

=== 1982 - 2014 ===
They got back together again 12 years later in 1982. In 2014, the band decided to call it a day and played their farewell concert at the Georgia Theater. The event was for Harold Williams who had suffered serious injuries following a fall.

Original and founding member Harold Williams died on May 17, 2015.

== Members ==
- Davis Causey, guitar, 1964
- Artie Christopher, vocals, 1965-1968,
- Steve Hartley - Lead vocals, 1967-1969, 1981 - 2000s
- Mike Haynes, keyboards, 1994
- Cleon Little, bass, 1968 - 2004
- Bill McDonald, sax, 1964
- Scotty Piotrowski, trumpet, 1964
- Tom Ryan, bass, 2004 - 2000s
- Freddy Seagraves, drums, 1964
- Donny Whitehead, sax, 1966
- Harold Williams, sax 1964
- Billy Young, trumpet, 1964
- Clarence Young, organ, 1982 - 1995

== List of past members ==
- David Aaron, guitar - 1968 - 1969
- Don Allgood, organ - 1965 - 1966
- Monty Black, bass - 1968
- Freddie Brown, keyboards - 1965
- Davis Causey, guitar - 1964 - 1968, 1981 - 2000s
- Artie Christopher, vocals - 1965 - 1968
- Larry Coffeen, saxophone - 1964 - 1965
- Mike Haynes, keyboards - 1991 - 2000s
- Steve Hartley, vocals - 1967-1969, 1981 - 2000s
- Lawrence Hill, trumpet, vocals - 1968 - 1969
- Bill MacDonald, saxophone - 1964-1969, 1981 - 2000s
- Cleon Nally, bass - 1965-1979, 1981 - 2000s
- Joel Osner - 1964 - 1968
- Scott Piotrowski, trumpet - 1965-1968, 1981 - 2000s
- Bobby Prince - 1964 - 1966
- David Prince, 1964 - 1966
- Tom Ryan, bass - 2004 - 2000s
- Ed Saye, vocal - 1964 - 1966
- Freddy Seagraves, drums - 1964 - 1969, 1981 to 2000s
- Donny Whitehead, saxophone - 1964-1969, 1981 - 2000s
- Harold Williams, 1964 - 1968, 1981 - 2000s
- Billy Young, trumpet - 1965-1969, 1981 - 2000s
- Clarence Young, keyboards - 1982 - 1995
- Diana Young, vocals - 1965

== Discography ==
- Sure Thing - SKU: 1933 - (2010)
