= Theron Feemster =

American record producer

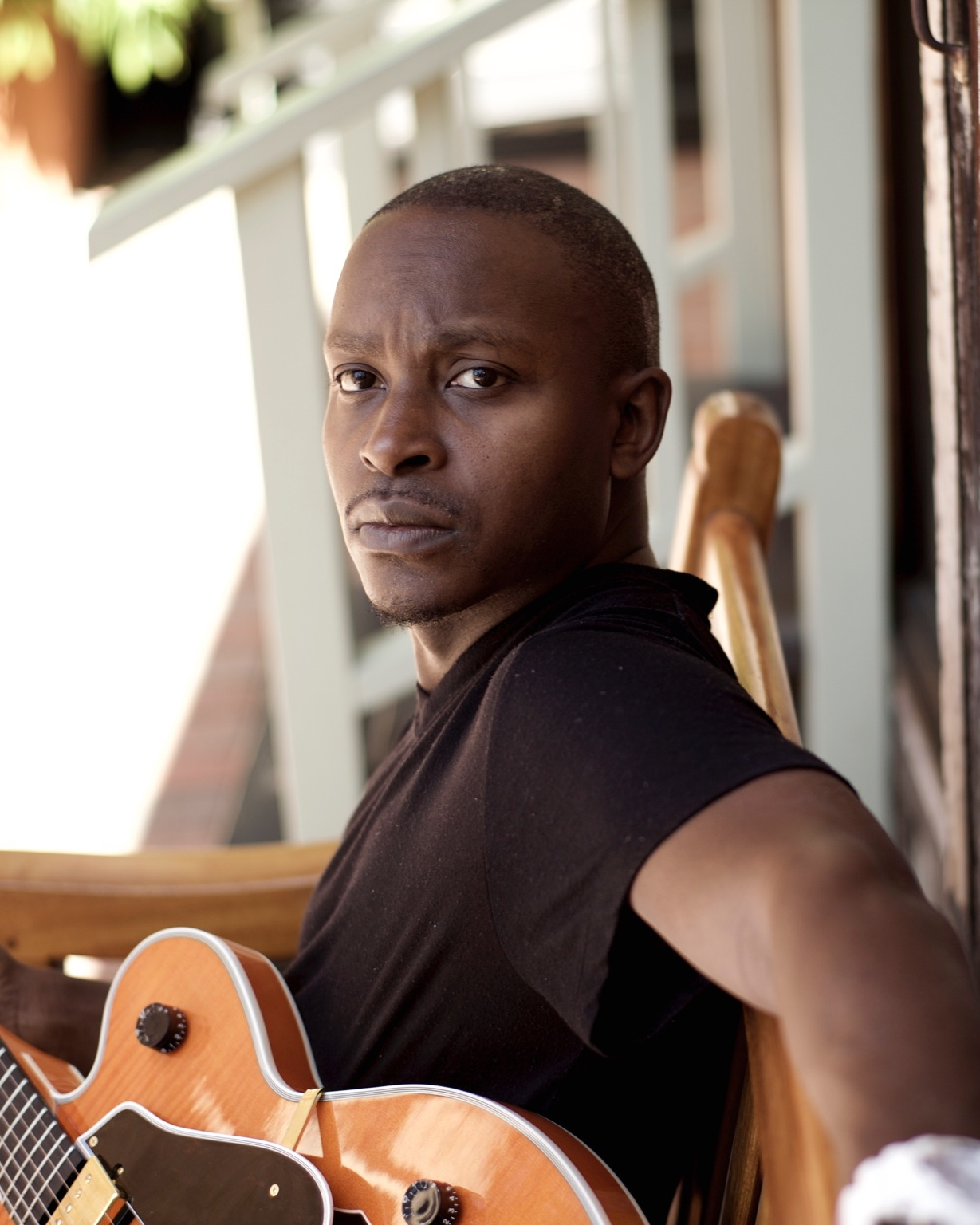
- Theron in 2015.

Background information
- Also known as: Neff-U; Ron Feemster
- Born: Theron Otis Feemster; January 4, 1981 (age 45)
- Genres: Pop; hip hop; R&B
- Occupations: Record producer; songwriter; multi-instrumentalist
- Instruments: Keyboards; drums; guitar; bass
- Years active: 2001–present

Theron Otis Feemster (born January 4, 1981) also known by the names Ron Feemster or Neff-U, is an American record producer, songwriter, and multi-instrumentalist.

== Life and career ==
Feemster was born and raised in Grover, North Carolina, where his family was very active in the local non-denominational church, and several family members were musicians. After graduating high school, he studied at Berklee College of Music in Massachusetts. After two-and-a-half years at Berklee, Feemster moved to Los Angeles, where producer Big Chuck heard his rap and R&B demos. Chuck arranged for Feemster to work with him on several projects, with Feemster getting his first cut with rapper Mack 10. Soon later, Dr. Dre consulted him to work on Eminem's 2002 studio album The Eminem Show on which he co-wrote four tracks. Also in 2002, he co-wrote and -produced on "Black Suits Comin' (Nod Ya Head)", which was featured in the film Men in Black II (2002). In 2003, Feemster launched into film composing when he scored the comedy film Death of a Dynasty.

== Selected production discography ==
Title	Year	Artist(s)	Album	Credited as	
Title	Year	Artist(s)	Album	Writer	Producer
"Work"	2001	Mack 10	Bang or Ball	Yes	Yes
"Business"	2002	Eminem	The Eminem Show	Yes	No
"My Dad's Gone Crazy"	2002	Eminem	The Eminem Show	Yes	No
"Say What You Say"	2002	Eminem	The Eminem Show	Yes	No
"When the Music Stops"	2002	Eminem	The Eminem Show	Yes	No
"Diamond Is Forever"	2002	Jay-Z	The Blueprint 2: The Gift & The Curse	Yes	Yes
"Black Suits Comin' (Nod Ya Head)"	2002	Will Smith	Born to Reign	Yes	Yes
"Back Down"	2003	50 Cent	Get Rich or Die Tryin'	Yes	No
"Bad When U Broke"	2003	Dave Hollister	Real Talk	Yes	Yes
"Not Today"	2003	Mary J. Blige	Love & Life	Yes	Yes
"Get Ignit"	2003	Westside Connection	Terrorist Threats	Yes	Yes
"Say You Will"	2004	Brandy	Afrodisiac	Yes	Yes
"18"	2004	Mario	Turning Point	Yes	Yes
"Couldn't Say No"	2004	Mario	Turning Point	Yes	Yes
"Here I Go Again"	2004	Mario	Turning Point	Yes	Yes
"All on You"	2004	New Edition	One Love	Yes	Yes
"Conference Call"	2004	New Edition	One Love	Yes	Yes
"One Love Interlude"	2004	New Edition	One Love	Yes	Yes
"Wish U Were Here"	2005	Jamie Foxx	Unpredictable	Yes	Yes
"Don't Hate Me"	2005	Mack 10	Hustla's Handbook	Yes	Yes
"The Testimony"	2005	Mack 10	Hustla's Handbook	Yes	Yes
"Sign Me Up"	2006	Ne-Yo	In My Own Words	Yes	Yes
"Stay"	2006	Ne-Yo	In My Own Words	Yes	Yes
"Treat Me Right"	2007	Backstreet Boys	Unbreakable	Yes	Yes
"Just Don't Have a Clue"	2007	Jaheim	The Makings of a Man	Yes	Yes
"Feel Like a Woman"	2007	Mary J. Blige	Growing Pains	Yes	Yes
"Work That"	2007	Mary J. Blige	Growing Pains	Yes	Yes
"Millionare"	2007	Musiq Soulchild	Luvanmusiq	Yes	Yes
"Thequestions"	2007	Musiq Soulchild	Luvanmusiq	Yes	Yes
"Crazy"	2007	Ne-Yo	Because of You	Yes	Yes
"Rockstar Mentality"	2007	Shop Boyz	Rockstar Mentality	Yes	Yes
"Showin' Me Love"	2007	Shop Boyz	Rockstar Mentality	Yes	Yes
"In These Streets"	2008	Ashanti	The Declaration	Yes	Yes
"Damages"	2008	Cherish	The Truth	Yes	Yes
"Erotic"	2008	Keyshia Cole	A Different Me	Yes	Yes
"You Complete Me"	2008	Keyshia Cole	A Different Me	Yes	Yes
"Warrior"	2008	Nelly	Brass Knuckles	Yes	Yes
"Wadsyaname"	2008	Nelly	Non-album single	Yes	Yes
"Don't Let Me Get Away"	2009	LeToya	Lady Love	Yes	No
"Lady Love"	2009	LeToya	Lady Love	Yes	Yes
"Can't Take That Away from Me"	2010	JoJo	Can't Take That Away from Me	No	Yes
"Running on Empty"	2010	JoJo	Can't Take That Away from Me	No	Yes
"Best of Joy"	2010	Michael Jackson	Michael	No	Yes
"Hold My Hand"	2010	Michael Jackson	Michael	No	Yes
"Hollywood Tonight"	2010	Michael Jackson	Michael	No	Yes
"(I Like) The Way You Love Me"	2010	Michael Jackson	Michael	No	Yes
"The One You Call"	2011	Keke Palmer	Awaken	Yes	Yes
"Break You Hard"	2011	Natalia Kills	Perfectionist	Yes	Yes
"If I Was God"	2011	Natalia Kills	Perfectionist	Yes	Yes
"Superficial"	2011	Natalia Kills	Perfectionist	Yes	Yes
"Wonderland"	2011	Natalia Kills	Perfectionist	Yes	Yes
"Charlie Ain't Home"	2012	ZZ Ward	Til the Casket Drops	Yes	Yes
"If I Could Be Her"	2012	ZZ Ward	Til the Casket Drops	Yes	Yes
"Home"	2012	ZZ Ward	Til the Casket Drops	Yes	Yes
"Move Like U Stole It"	2012	ZZ Ward	Til the Casket Drops	Yes	Yes
"Put the Gun Down"	2012	ZZ Ward	Til the Casket Drops	Yes	Yes
"Save My Life"	2012	ZZ Ward	Til the Casket Drops	Yes	Yes
"Til the Casket Drops"	2012	ZZ Ward	Til the Casket Drops	Yes	Yes
"Wanna Be With You"	2013	Aloe Blacc	Lift Your Spirit	Yes	Yes
"Issues"	2015	Dr. Dre	Compton	Yes	Yes
"Just Another Day"	2015	Dr. Dre	Compton	Yes	Yes
"I'll Show You"	2015	Justin Bieber	Purpose	Yes	No
"When I Met You"	2016	Fantasia	The Definition Of...	Yes	Yes
"Llegaste Tú"	2016	Sofía Reyes	Louder!	Yes	Yes
"Remind Me (Intro)"	2017	Eminem	Revival	Yes	Yes
"Red Carpet"	2017	Fabri Fibra	Fenomeno	Yes	Yes
"Drink Up"	2017	Train	A Girl, a Bottle, a Boat	Yes	Yes
"Loverman"	2017	Train	A Girl, a Bottle, a Boat	Yes	Yes
"Streets"	2019	Doja Cat	Hot Pink	Yes	No
"Christmas Party for Two"	2023	Brandy	Christmas with Brandy	Yes	Yes
