= Til the Casket Drops (ZZ Ward album) =

Studio album by ZZ Ward
- Released: October 16, 2012
- Genre: Blues rock, hip-hop, R&B, soul
- Length: 44:35
- Label: Hollywood
- Producer: Blended Babies; Theron "Neff-U" Feemster; Michael Fitzpatrick; Ludwig Göransson; Brent Kutzle; Ali Shaheed Muhammad; Ryan Tedder

ZZ Ward chronology
Criminal EP (2012)	Til the Casket Drops (2012)	Love and War (2015)

Singles from Til the Casket Drops
- 1. "Put the Gun Down" Released: July 17, 2012; 2. "365 Days" Released: May 20, 2013; 3. "Last Love Song" Released: February 13, 2014

Til the Casket Drops is the debut studio album by ZZ Ward, released on October 16, 2012. The album generated three singles, "Put the Gun Down" which reached number 7 on the Billboard Adult Alternative Songs, "365 Days" which reached number 4, and "Last Love Song" which reached number 15.

"Til the Casket Drops" and "Last Love Song" were featured in the television series Pretty Little Liars for promotional advertisement in the series' third and fifth seasons.

== Development ==
After Ward was signed in 2011, it took her and Hollywood Records a while to choose a producer, but eventually she settled on Theron "Neff-U" Feemster, who ended up producing half the album. The album was recorded at Ahh Haaa Studios, Hyperion Sound, Rusk Studio, Boardwalk Records, Westlake Recording Studio, Eargasm Studios, and Northern Recording Studios. It was engineered at Fairfax Recordings and Sound City, and mixed at the HotPurplePettngZoo. The theme for the album "is about going to war for someone that you love, which is kind of the theme to the album." Ward blends several genres, such as back-porch blues and hip hop, to develop her style of "Dirty Shine". Ward got to work with Ryan Tedder and Brent Kutzle of OneRepublic on the acoustic ballad "Last Love Song", which provides the one quiet moment on gritty, bluesy rock 'n soul album. The song "Criminal" took organ and piano tunes from Freddie Gibbs "Oil Money", and also features Gibbs on vocals.

== Reception ==
Chicago Music Magazine rated the album at five stars and AllMusic rated it at four stars.

== Track listing ==
All tracks are written by ZZ Ward. Additional writers are included below.

No.	Title	Writer(s)	Producer	Length
1.	"Til the Casket Drops"		Theron "Neff-U" Feemster	3:05
2.	"Put the Gun Down"		Feemster	2:50
3.	"Blue Eyes Blind"	Ludwig Göransson	Göransson	3:26
4.	"Home"		Feemster	3:42
5.	"Cryin Wolf" (featuring Kendrick Lamar)	Chuck Bein; Jonathan Keller; Kendrick Lamar; Richard Parry; Maceo Vidal-Haymes	Blended Babies	4:02
6.	"Save My Life"	Michael Fitzpatrick	Fitzpatrick; Feemster	3:20
7.	"Last Love Song"		Ryan Tedder; Brent Kutzle	3:31
8.	"Lil Darlin" (featuring The O'Mys)	Nick Hennessey; Jonathan Keller; Richard Parry; Maceo Vidal-Haymes	Blended Babies	3:34
9.	"Move Like U Stole It"		Feemster	3:19
10.	"Criminal" (featuring Freddie Gibbs)	Dan Auerbach; Bun B; E. Kidd Bogart; Freddie Gibbs; Evan Ingersoll; Brendan Joyce; Jonathan Keller; Richard Parry; Charles Worth	Blended Babies	3:51
11.	"If I Could Be Her"	Julian Bunetta	Feemster	2:50
12.	"Charlie Ain't Home"		Ali Shaheed Muhammad; Feemster	3:36
13.	"365 Days"		Blended Babies	3:29
Total length:				44:35

Notes

- "Charlie Ain't Home" does not appear on the clean version of the album.

Sample credits

- "Criminal" contains a sample from "Oil Money" performed by Freddie Gibbs featuring Bun B, Evan Ingersoll, Dan Auerbach and King Chip

== Personnel ==
Musicians

- ZZ Ward – vocals, guitars, harmonica, keyboards
- Thomas Drayton – Bass (track 1, 2, 4, 9, 11)
- Peter Lee Johnson – violin (track 1)
- Theron "Neff-U" Feemster – programming (track 1, 2, 4, 6, 9, 11, 12), drums (track 6), keyboards, percussion (track 12)
- Ludwig Göransson – keyboards, guitars, bass, programming (track 3)
- Maceo Vidal-Haymes – additional vocals (track 5), guitars (track 8)
- Chuck Bein – guitars (track 5)
- Jonathan "J.P." Keller – bass (track 5, 8, 10, 13), organ (track 8, 10, 13), piano, programming (track 10), guitars (track 13)
- Richard "Rich" Parry – live drums (track 5), programming (track 5, 10), piano, keyboards (track 10)
- Greg Landfair Jr. – live drums, programming (track 5)
- Michael "Fitz" Fitzpatrick – piano, strings, bass, drums, programming (track 6)
- Ryan Tedder – piano, drums, timpani, percussion (track 7)
- Brent Kutzle – piano, drums, timpani, percussion, cello, viola (track 7)
- Brian Ray – guitars (track 7)
- Nick Hennesey – piano (track 8)
- Reid Muchow – drums (track 8)
- Carter Lang – bass (track 8)
- Brendan Joyce – bass (track 10)
- Ali Shaheed Muhammad – bass, keyboards, percussion, programming (track 12)
- Erick Walls – guitar (track 12)
- Blended Babies – programming (track 13)

Production

- Kevin Augunas – recording
- Gavin Paddock – vocal engineering
- NealHPogue – mixing
- Jeremiah "J-Hop" Olvera – mix assist
- James Murray – engineering (track 1, 2)
- Robert Horn – engineering (track 4, 9, 11)
- Rob "Kaballah" Kleiner – engineering, vocal recording (track 5, 7, 8, 10, 13)
- Derek "Mixedbyali" Ali – engineering (track 5)
- Michael "Fitz" Fitzpatrick – engineering (track 6)
- Joe Zook and Jared Rich – engineering (track 7)
- Brooklyn Fraser – assistant engineering (track 7)
- Evan "Kidd" Bogart – vocal recording (track 7)
- Jill Tengan; engineering (track 12)
