= ZZ Ward =

American singer-songwriter (born 1986)

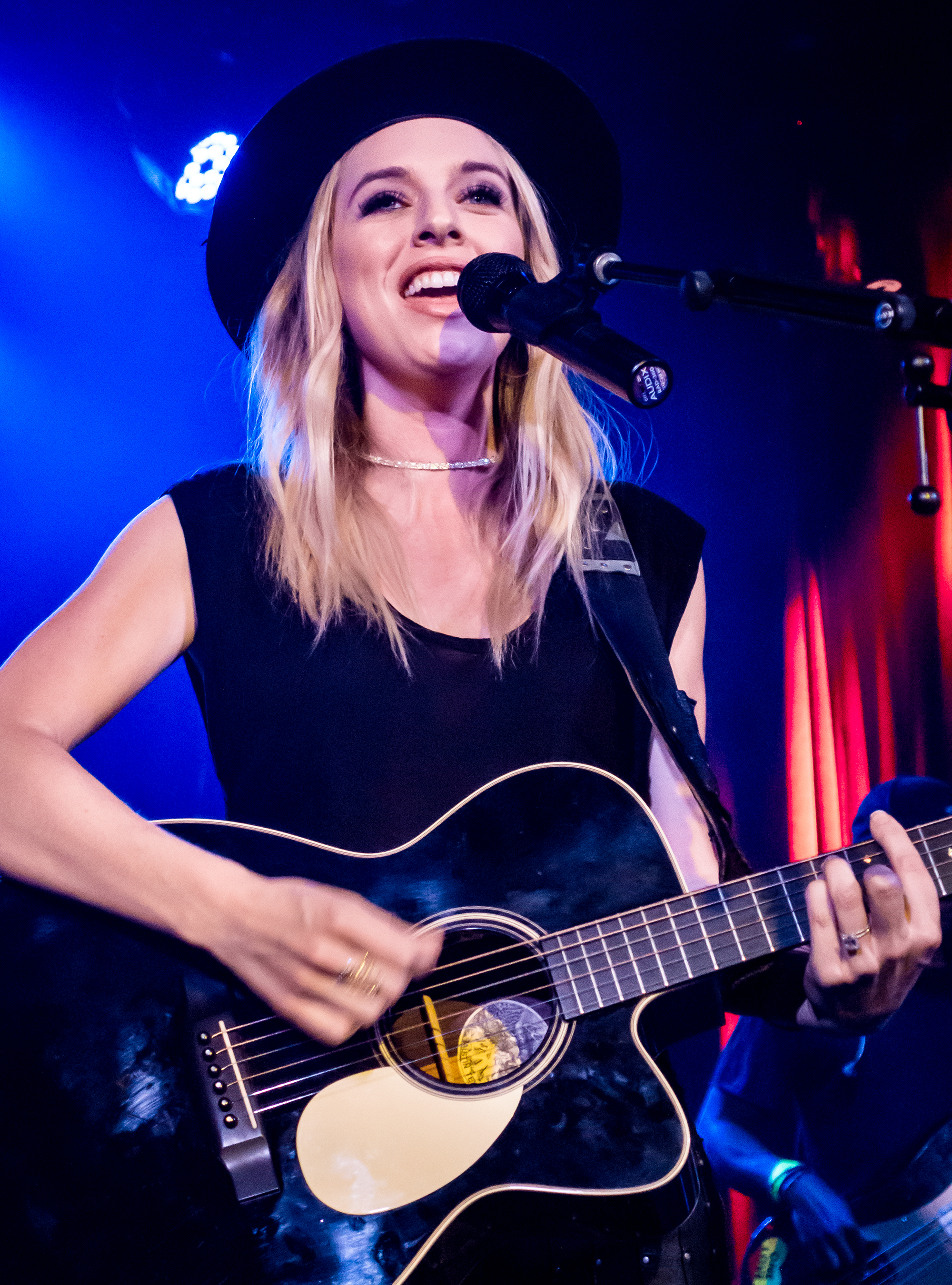
- Ward performing in 2017

Background information
- Born: Zsuzsanna Eva Ward; June 2, 1986 (age 40); Abington, Pennsylvania, U.S.
- Origin: Roseburg, Oregon, U.S.
- Genres: Blues rock; R&B; pop rock; blue-eyed soul
- Occupation: Singer-songwriter
- Instruments: Vocals; guitar; harmonica; piano; keyboards
- Years active: 2012–present
- Labels: Dirty Shine; Sun; Boardwalk; Hollywood
- Spouse: E. Kidd Bogart (m. 2017)
- Children: 2
- Website: www.zzward.com

Zsuzsanna Eva Ward (born June 2, 1986) is an American singer-songwriter from Roseburg, Oregon. She signed with Hollywood Records to release her debut extended play (EP), Criminal (2012), which preceded the release of her debut studio album, Til the Casket Drops, that same year. Her second studio album, The Storm (2017), peaked atop the Billboard Blues Albums Chart. Her third studio album, Dirty Shine (2023), was released independently, and met with critical acclaim.

== Early life ==
Born in Abington, Pennsylvania, Ward grew up in Roseburg, Oregon, where she joined her first band, with her father, at the age of 12. Ward recalled the first song she sang was "an Albert King track called 'As the Years Go Passing By'".

Ward's maternal grandmother, Zsuzsanna Friedman, was a Jewish Hungarian who converted to Catholicism to avoid persecution during the Holocaust. On discovering this, Ward, who grew up in a secular household, took an interest in reclaiming her Jewish roots.

== Career ==
=== 2011–2014: Debut EP and Til the Casket Drops ===
After moving to Los Angeles and signing to E. Kidd Bogart's Boardwalk Entertainment Group, Ward began recording the Criminal EP, as well as Eleven Roses, a free mixtape on which she offered her interpretations of tracks by Kendrick Lamar, Childish Gambino, Tyler, the Creator, Freddie Gibbs and Wiz Khalifa. Eleven Roses features "Better Of Dead", "Got It Bad", "Overdue", "Criminal", "Morphine", and "Cinnamon Stix". It was released on 3 November 2011. For the recording of "Criminal", she sampled the beat from "Oil Money" by Freddie Gibbs, who was so impressed by Ward's remake that he asked to contribute a guest verse to the official version on the EP. The Criminal EP was released on May 8, 2012, and features the songs "Til the Casket Drops", "Put the Gun Down", "Move Like U Stole It", and "Criminal" (feat. Freddie Gibbs).

Ward's debut album, Til the Casket Drops, was released on October 16, 2012. It includes the singles "365 Days", "Put the Gun Down" and "Last Love Song", the song "Cryin' Wolf" with Kendrick Lamar, as well as appearances from Ryan Tedder, Ali Shaheed Muhammad, Theron "Neff-U" Feemster and Fitz of Fitz and the Tantrums. Ward performed the album's first single, "Put the Gun Down", on VH1's Big Morning Buzz Live with Carrie Keagan on September 19, 2012, The Tonight Show with Jay Leno on November 1, 2012, and Conan on January 10, 2013. In March 2013, the New York Times said of Ward, "Her energy evokes Tina Turner's, her chops Aretha Franklin's and her soul Etta James's", and she was named one of Fuse TV's 30 must-see artists at SXSW. Ward performed her second single, "365 Days", on Good Morning America and Big Morning Buzz Live, both on March 7, 2013; on the September 3, 2013, episode of The Tonight Show with Jay Leno; and on the January 30, 2014, episode of The Late Late Show with Craig Ferguson.

On April 20, 2013, for Record Store Day, Ward released a limited edition 7-inch vinyl that included her cover of "Grinnin in Your Face", written and originally recorded by Son House, and a previously unreleased song, "Everybody Wants to Be Famous". The 7-inch cover features an image taken of Ward when she was 11 years-old. The following month, Ward, in conjunction with her second single release, launched her 365 Days of ZZ Ward app.

Notable live appearances in 2014 include Coachella Valley Music and Arts Festival, Bonnaroo Music Festival, and a short tour with Eric Clapton.

=== 2015–2018: Love and War EP and The Storm ===
Ward's second EP, Love and War, was released on Hollywood Records on August 28, 2015.

On February 11, 2017, Ward performed at the Americana Music Association's tribute concert to Loretta Lynn at the Troubadour in West Hollywood, California, performing a cover of "The Home You're Tearing Down". She performed at the inaugural Arroyo Seco Weekend festival in June 2017 at the Rose Bowl in Pasadena, California.

On March 2, Ward released the single "The Deep", featuring Chicago MC Joey Purp. The track is built around a sample of "As Long As I've Got You" by The Charmels, which is also sampled in "C.R.E.A.M." by Wu-Tang Clan. The song is about Ward's feelings of being trapped in a bad relationship. The song's music video premiered on W magazine's website on March 9, 2017. Also in 2017, Ward collaborated with Gary Clark Jr. on "Ride" from the soundtrack to the Pixar film Cars 3. Ward performed "Ride" on Dancing with the Stars on April 17, 2017.

Ward's second studio album, The Storm, was released on June 30, 2017, through Hollywood Records. It peaked at number 1 on the Billboard Blues Albums chart in July 2017, at number 12 on the Billboard Rock Albums chart, and at number 75 on the Billboard 200. The music video for the single "Cannonball" (featuring Fantastic Negrito) was released in July 2017.

=== 2019–2020: Departure from Hollywood Records ===
In 2019, Ward released a new single which was speculated to be the lead single from a potential third studio album, the single "Sex & Stardust" was released on December 13, 2019. On 2020, Ward released three more singles "Break Her Heart", "The Dark", and "Giant", these songs would be her latest releases under Hollywood Records before parting ways with the label.

=== 2021–2023: Dirty Shine and Dirty Shine Records ===
In 2021, Ward became an independent artist and funded her own record label Dirty Shine Records, the name being a nod to Ward's fanbase which reference themselves as "Dirty Shine Fam”. She also announced her first independent single "Tin Cups" with Aloe Blacc which end up being the lead single of her third studio album Dirty Shine; five singles were released prior the album release. The album dropped on September 8, 2023, to widespread critical acclaim by music critics, who praised Ward's versatility and overall performance.

=== 2024–present: Sun Records and Liberation ===
On February 9, 2024, Ward released the single "WTH Did I Do?". She followed it up with the single "Best Friends" on March 8. Both songs were included on her third EP, Where Did All the Love Go?. On May 20, Ward announced that she had signed with Sun Records.

Her first release with them was "Mother" on July 19. An extended play of the same name, was released on October 4. The release of the extended play lead up to the announcement of Ward's fourth studio album Liberation. The album was released on March 14, 2025, and saw critical praise from music critics, which dubbed it as Ward's best work to date. Mother EP and Liberation marked Ward's return to the charts, becoming Ward's second and third top-ten records on the Billboard Blues Album Chart, peaking at seven and five, respectively.

== Personal life ==
Ward married record producer E. Kidd Bogart in May 2017. Their first child, Ezra Jack Bogart, was born on February 3, 2021. Ward announced her pregnancy in November 2020 in the music video for her song "Giant". In October 2023, Ward announced via her social media accounts that she is expecting her second child.

Ward is sometimes called "the hat girl" due to her always wearing a fedora onstage. She began doing this at 12 years old when she performed with her father's blues band and wanted to feel "more confident like Muddy Waters and Big Mama Thornton."

== Filmography ==
Year	Title	Role	Notes
2018	Wally Got Wasted	Officer Sanders	Acting debut

== Discography ==
Studio albums

- Til the Casket Drops (2012)
- The Storm (2017)
- Dirty Shine (2023)
- Liberation (2025)

== See also ==
- List of former Hollywood Records artists
- Honorific nicknames in popular music
