= M. Pokora discography =

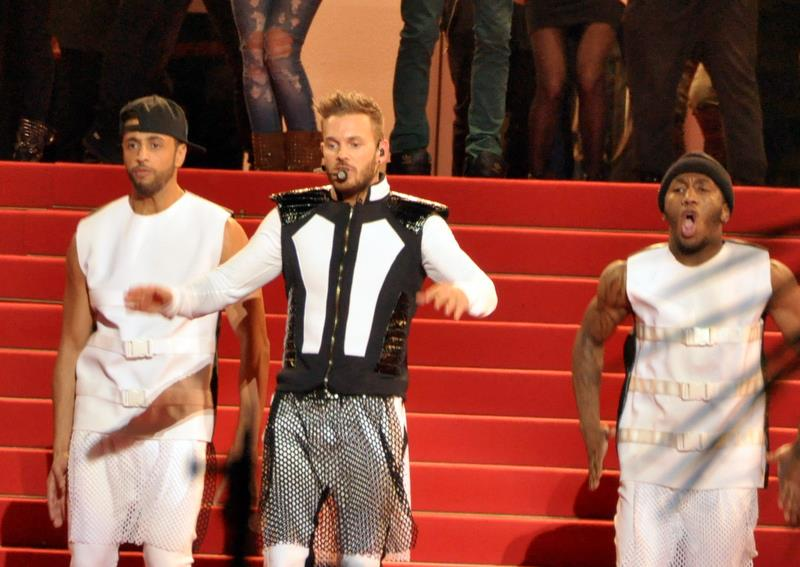

This is the discography of French singer and songwriter M. Pokora.

== Albums ==
=== Studio albums ===
As part of Linkup

Year	Album	Details	Charts		Sales	Certification
Year	Album	Details	FRA	SWI	Sales	Certification
2003	Notre étoile (as a member of Linkup)	Released: November 2003	1	53	200,000	2x Platinum

Solo

Year	Album	Details	Charts				Sales	Certification
Year	Album	Details	FRA	BEL (Wa)	SWI	POL	Sales	Certification
2004	M. Pokora	Released: 2 November 2004	21	28	—	—	161,900	Platinum
2006	Player	Released: 23 January 2006	1	8	37	—	210,000+	2× Platinum
2008	MP3	Released: 24 March 2008	7	6	32	22	Physicals (all around the world): 180,000; DL: 15,000; Sold inside cellphone: 171,000	Gold
2010; 2011	Mise à jour / Updated / Mise à jour Version 2.0	Released: 23 August 2010; Released: 14 March 2011; Released: 18 April 2011	4	7	65	—	200,000	2× Platinum
2012	À la poursuite du bonheur	Released: 19 March 2012	2	2	12	—	300,000	3× Platinum
2015	R.E.D.	Released: 2 February 2015	1	1	4	—		
2016	My Way	Released: 21 October 2016	1	1	7	—	650,000	Diamond,
2019	Pyramide	Released: 12 April 2019	1	1	8	—	FRA : 325,000	
2022	Épicentre	Released: 4 November 2022	2	1	88	—		
2025	Adrénaline	Released: 21 March 2025	1	3	54	—		

Special releases

- 2013: À la poursuite du bonheur / Mise à jour (re-release)

Live albums

Year	Album	Details	Charts			Sales	Certification
Year	Album	Details	FRA	BEL (Wa)	SWI	Sales	Certification
2013	À la poursuite du bonheur Tour - Live à Bercy	Released: March 2013	1	2	—		
2016	R.E.D. Tour	Date de sortie : 22 avril 2016	2	—	—		
2017	My Way Tour Live	Released: 10 November 2017	5	4	44		

== Singles ==
As part of Linkup

- 2003: "Mon étoile"
- 2003: "Une seconde d'éternité"
- 2004: "You and Me Bubblin'" (Blue and Linkup)

Solo singles

Year	Title	Chart positions											Album
Year	Title	FRA	BEL (Wa)	SWI	SWE	GER	FIN	MAL	TUR	POL	CZE	MEX	Album
2004	"Showbiz (The Battle)"	10	12	19	—	—	—	—	—	—	—	—	M. Pokora
2005	"Elle me contrôle"	6	11	23	—	—	—	—	—	—	—	—	M. Pokora
2005	"Pas sans toi"	4	4	35	—	—	—	—	—	—	—	—	M. Pokora
2006	"De retour" (with Tyron Carter)	6	11	—	—	—	—	—	—	—	—	—	Player
2006	"It's Alright" (with Ricky Martin)	4	11	18	—	—	—	—	—	—	—	—	Player
2006	"Oh la la la (Sexy Miss)"	21	37	—	—	—	—	—	—	—	—	—	Player
2006	"Mal de guerre"	9	19	78	—	—	—	—	—	—	—	—	Player
2008	"Dangerous" (with Timbaland & Sebastian)	1	2	28	15	32	4	10	18	11	32	4	MP3
2008	"They Talk Shit About Me" (with Verse)	24	53*	—	21	—	—	—	—	23	—	—	MP3
2008	"Catch Me if You Can"	—	—	—	—	—	—	—	—	2	—	—	MP3
2009	"Through the Eyes"	—	—	—	—	—	—	—	—	3	—	—	MP3
2010	"Juste une photo de toi"	44	27	75	—	—	—	—	—	—	—	—	Mise à jour
2010	"Mirage"	64	87*	—	—	—	—	—	—	—	—	—	Mise à jour
2010	"Oblivion"	64	37	—	—	—	—	—	—	—	—	—	Updated
2011	"À nos actes manqués"	8	16	—	—	—	—	—	—	—	—	—	Mise à jour Version 2.0
2011	"Finally Found Ya"	—	—	—	—	—	—	—	—	—	—	—	Updated
2011	"En attendant la fin"	24	31	—	—	—	—	—	—	—	—	—	Mise à jour
2012	"Juste un instant"	18	6	57	—	—	—	—	—	—	—	—	À La Poursuite Du Bonheur
2012	"On est là"	38	42	—	—	—	—	—	—	—	—	—	À La Poursuite Du Bonheur
2012	"Merci d'être"	55	56*	—	—	—	—	—	—	—	—	—	À La Poursuite Du Bonheur
2012	"Envole-moi" (with Tal)	5	7	39	—	—	—	—	—	—	—	—	À La Poursuite Du Bonheur & Génération Goldman
2012	"Si tu pars"	137	52*	—	—	—	—	—	—	—	—	—	À La Poursuite Du Bonheur
2013	"Le jour qui se rêve"	22	47	—	—	—	—	—	—	—	—	—	Robin des Bois
2013	"J'attendais"	131	—	—	—	—	—	—	—	—	—	—	Robin des Bois
2014	"On danse"	16	26	—	—	—	—	—	—	—	—	—	R. E. D.
2014	"Le monde"	15	24	—	—	—	—	—	—	—	—	—	R. E. D.
2015	"Mieux que nous" (feat. Soprano)	29	56*	—	—	—	—	—	—	—	—	—	R. E. D.
2015	"(Everything I Do) I Do It For You"	97	—	—	—	—	—	—	—	—	—	—	Les stars font leur cinéma
2015	"Voir la nuit s'emballer"	104	54*	—	—	—	—	—	—	—	—	—	R. E. D.
2015	"Elle me contrôle (2015)" (feat. Tenny)	—	55*	—	—	—	—	—	—	—	—	—	
2016	"Cette année-là"	7	—	—	—	—	—	—	—	—	—	—	
2016	"Belinda"	43	—	—	—	—	—	—	—	—	—	—	
2019	"Les planètes"	45	2	—	—	—	—	—	—	—	—	—	Pyramide
2019	"Tombé"	32	4	—	—	—	—	—	—	—	—	—	Pyramide
2019	"Si t'es pas là"	136	10	—	—	—	—	—	—	—	—	—	Pyramide
2020	"Dance avec moi"	149	—	—	—	—	—	—	—	—	—	—	Pyramide
2020	"Si on disait"	—	—	—	—	—	—	—	—	—	—	—	
2020	"S'en aller"	—	34	—	—	—	—	—	—	—	—	—	
2022	"Qui on est"	—	21	—	—	—	—	—	—	—	—	—	Épicentre
2023	"Se mélanger"	—	50	—	—	—	—	—	—	—	—	—	Épicentre
2023	"Parce que c'est toi"	—	46	—	—	—	—	—	—	—	—	—	Non-album singles
2025	"Reflet"	—	33	—	—	—	—	—	—	—	—	—	Non-album singles
2025	"Mille fois"	—	31	—	—	—	—	—	—	—	—	—	Non-album singles

*Single did not appear in official Belgian (Wallonia) Ultratop 50 chart, but rather in the Ultratip bubbling under charts. Position reflected in table is by adding 50 additional positions to actual Ultratip chart position.

== Other charted songs ==
Year	Title	Chart positions	Album
Year	Title	FRA	Album
2016	"Comme d'habitude"	80	My Way
2016	"Magnolias for Ever"	103	My Way
2016	"Alexandrie, Alexandra"	128	My Way
2016	"Belles! Belles! Belles!"	143	My Way

== DVDs ==
- 2005 "Un an avec M. Pokora" (One year with M. Pokora)
- 2007 "100% VIP" (with Alexandra Gas)
- 2006 "Player Tour"
- 2012 "A La Poursuite Du Bonheur Tour"
- 2015 "M.Pokora 10 ans de Carrière Symphonic Show"

== Guest appearances ==
- 2004 "Chanter qu'on les aime", a charity single by Amade
- 2005 "Protège-toi", a charity single by Collectif Protection Rapprochée
- 2005 "Et puis la terre...", a charity single by A.S.I.E.
- 2006 "Oh" (French Remix) by Ciara
- 2006 "L'Or de nos vies", a charity single from Fight Aids
- 2006 "rainbfever.com" by Amine featured on "Raï'n'B Fever 2"
- 2007 "Ne me dis pas", featured on "Mon Hold-Up" by Tyron Carter
- 2007 "Girls", featured on "Lady Sweety" by Lady Sweety
- 2007 "Je fais de toi mon essentiel" by Emmanuel Moire featured on the charity album "Le Roi Soleil – De Monaco à Versailles (Live) – Fight Aids"
- 2007 "S'aimer est interdit" by Anne-Laure Girbal featured on the charity album "Le Roi Soleil – De Monaco à Versailles (Live) – Fight Aids"
- 2010 "Un respect mutuel", a charity single by Collectif Kilomaitre
- 2010 "Talking About a Revolution", featured on the charity album "Message (AIDES)"
- 2010 "Let's Get It Started", featured on "Setting Standards" by Lazee
- 2011 "Des ricochets", a charity single by collectif Paris Africa
- 2012 "Wanna Feel You Now", featured on "Globetrotter" by Patricia Kazadi

== Soundtrack song ==
- 2006 "Get Down on It" from (Astérix et les Vikings)
