= À La Poursuite Du Bonheur Tour - Live à Bercy =

À la poursuite du bonheur Tour – Live à Bercy

Live album by M. Pokora
- Released: 1 March 2013
- Recorded: 16 December 2012
- Genre: Pop, R&B
- Label: EMI France

M. Pokora chronology
À la poursuite du bonheur (2012)	À la poursuite du bonheur Tour – Live à Bercy (2013)	R.E.D. (2015)

À la poursuite du bonheur Tour – Live à Bercy sometimes abbreviated as ALPDBT is a live album by French singer M. Pokora and a surprising number one for any live album at the top of the SNEP French albums chart. The tour was based mostly on M. Pokora's most recent album À la poursuite du bonheur that had made it to number 2 on the French Albums Chart.

Recorded during his concert at Palais Omnisports de Paris-Bercy on 16 December 2012, the album includes three performances with invitees, "Le temps qu'il faut" with Corneille, "Envole-moi", a Jean-Jaques Goldman cover with Tal and a sketch "Petit oiseau" with comedian Gad Elmaleh. During the concert, Pokora sang also another Goldman classic, "À nos actes manqués", one of his biggest hits from the album Mise à jour.

A filmed version is also available as a DVD.

== Track listing ==
No.	Title	Length
1.	"Intro ALPDBT"	1:53
2.	"Cours"	3:25
3.	"Encore + fort"	3:04
4.	"Juste une photo de toi"	4:04
5.	"Le temps qu'il faut" (feat. Corneille)	3:43
6.	"Pas sans toi"	3:46
7.	"Elle me contrôle / Dangerous" (Medley)	4:27
8.	"Si tu pars"	3:41
9.	"Mon évidence"	4:20
10.	"Danse sur ma musique"	3:10
11.	"On est là"	3:19
12.	"Envole-moi" (feat. Tal)	3:10
13.	"Plus haut"	3:32
14.	"Ma poupée"	3:20
15.	"En attendant la fin"	5:23
16.	"Mes rêveurs"	3:25
17.	"Zouk ALPDBT"	2:38
18.	"Merci d'être"	3:46
19.	"À nos actes manqués"	4:46
20.	"Petit oiseau" (Sketch featuring Gad Elmaleh)	4:58
21.	"Juste un instant"	8:15
22.	"Hallelujah"	4:23

== Charts ==
This is the first of just two Pokora album that have reached the top of the SNEP French Albums Chart. In 2006, his album Player had become his first number one on the top of the French Charts. MP3 (M. Pokora album) had made it to number 7, Mise à jour to number 4 and À la poursuite du bonheur only to number 2.

Chart (2010)	Peak position
Belgium (Wallonia) Albums Chart	2
French Albums Chart	1
