= Notre étoile =

Studio album by Linkup
- Released: December 2, 2003
- Recorded: 2003
- Genre: Pop
- Label: Universal Licensing Music (ULM)
- Producer: A. Aubaille; N. Neidhardt; Nicolas Neidhardt; P. Falcao

Notre étoile (English: Our star) is the debut and only studio album of the French boy band Linkup made of Lionel Tim, Otis and Matthieu Tota (later on known as M. Pokora). It was released in 2003 on Universal Licensing Music (ULM) in France after it was created during the third season of the popular French reality show "Popstars", called "Popstars - the Duel" aired on RTL Group TV channel M6.

== Track list ==
No.	Title	Writer(s)	Length
1.	"Mon étoile"	J. Cates, K. Paige	3:22
2.	"Une seconde d'éternité"	C. Walz, C. J. Olof Olson, T. Harris	2:54
3.	"Je ne t'ai pas oubliée"	G. Dennis, T. Laws	4:10
4.	"It's Only Uh Uh (Tu es à moi); Backing Vocals [Choir] – G. Eyango, JM Marrier, M. Lefebvre"	P. Martin, S. Lee, T. Harris	3:13
5.	"Le clash"	A. Tennant, M. Stevens	3:54
6.	"Si j'avoue"	M. Hervé	3:45
7.	"Les séries américaines"	Aleena Gibson, Anders Bergström, Julius Bengtsson	3:22
8.	"Mes ex"	M. Smith, M. Nucci	3:39
9.	"Ça arrive"	A. Powers, M. Altman	3:31
10.	"Cowboys"	L. Lescarret, P. Wallevick	3:43
11.	"Ça l'fait comme ça"	J. Hartman, M. Nelkin, T. Harris	3:45
12.	"Une histoire qui roule bien"	Arranged by A. Aubaille, N. Neidhardt; Written-By – J. Kask, L. Peirone, P. Mansson	3:36

== Credits ==
- Adapted by A. Essertier (tracks: 1, 2, 6, 7, 11), F. Welgryn (tracks: 1, 2, 6, 7, 9, 11, 12), Jimmy Bitton (tracks: 4), Laurent Lescarret (tracks: 3, 8), Maïdi Roth (tracks: 5)
- Graphic artwork by – Happydesign
- Backing Vocals [Choir] – Guillaume Eyango (tracks: 2, 3, 5, 10 to 12), J.Marie Marrier (tracks: 1, 6, 7, 9)
- Bass – Rémy Léger (tracks: 1, 3 to 12)
- Brass – Christian Fourquet (tracks: 3, 8), Eric Mula (tracks: 3, 8), Vincent Chavagnac (tracks: 3, 8)
- Drums – Jost Nickel (tracks: 1, 3, 4, 6, 8, 9, 12), Yves Sanna (tracks: 7, 10)
- Edited by – C. Lieu (tracks: 1 to 8, 10 to 12), T. Vercruysse (tracks: 3, 11)
- Sound engineer – Steve Forward
- Executive Producer – Alain Yahmi, G. Baurez, L. Maurel
- Guitar – A. Aubaille (tracks: 12), B. Commére (tracks: 7), P. Falcao, S. Forward (tracks: 4)
- Keyboards – N. Neidhardt (tracks: 4, 10)
- Strings – Simon Hale (tracks: 1, 3, 6, 9, 10)
- Piano – A. Aubaille (tracks: 1), Guillaume Eyango (tracks: 8), N. Neidhardt (tracks: 6, 9)
- Mastered by – Miles Showell
- Mixed by – Christian Lieu (tracks: 11, 12), Nicolas Garin (tracks: 9), Steve Forward (tracks: 1 to 8, 10)
- String Orchestration – London Session Orchestra
- Production Coordinator – Stéphanie Marquer
- Photography By – Vincent Soyez
- Producer – A. Aubaille (tracks: 2, 5, 8, 12), N. Neidhardt (tracks: 1, 2, 5 to 8, 12), Nicolas Neidhardt (tracks: 3, 4, 9 to 11), P. Falcao (tracks: 1, 6, 7)
- Pre-production Producer – A. Aubaille (tracks: 2, 5, 8, 12), B. Commére (tracks: 4, 7, 10, 11), N. Neidhardt (tracks: 3, 9), P. Falcao (tracks: 1, 6), R. Léger* (tracks: 4, 7, 10, 11)
- Programmed by – Arnaud Aubaille (tracks: 2, 5, 7, 8, 11, 12), A. Aubaille (tracks: 4), B. Commére (tracks: 4, 10), N. Neidhardt* (tracks: 3, 9, 10), P. Falcao (tracks: 1, 6), R. Léger (tracks: 4, 10)
- Additional Programming by – C. Lieu (tracks: 2, 4, 12), N. Neidhardt (tracks: 4)
- Additional Recording by – T. Vercruysse
