= En attendant la fin =

Single by M. Pokora

from the album Mise à jour
- Released: October 17, 2011
- Genre: Pop
- Length: 3:10
- Label: EMI Music France
- Songwriter(s): Olivier Reine
- Producer(s): Olivier Reine

M. Pokora singles chronology
| "À nos actes manqués" (2011) | "En attendant la fin" (2011) | "Juste un instant" (2012) |

"En attendant la fin" (Waiting for the end) is a song performed by French singer M. Pokora. It was written and produced by Olivier Reine. It serves as the third single from Pokora's fourth studio album Mise à jour. It was released on October 17, 2011.

== Music video ==
The video was released on YouTube on November 22, 2011. It was filmed in the "black and white" format.

== Chart performance ==
"En attendant la fin" peaked at number 24 on the French Singles Chart.

== Charts ==
| Chart (2011) | Peak position |
|---|---|
| Belgium (Ultratop 50 Wallonia) | 31 |
| France (SNEP) | 24 |
