= M. Pokora (album) =

Studio album by M. Pokora
- Released: 2 November 2004
- Recorded: 2003–2004
- Genre: R&B, hip hop, crunk
- Length: 41:28
- Label: ULM; Universal
- Producer: Kore

M. Pokora chronology
M. Pokora (2004)	Player (2006)

Singles from M. Pokora
- 1. "Showbiz (The Battle)" Released: 15 November 2004; 2. "Elle Me Contrôle" Released: 4 April 2005; 3. "Pas Sans Toi" Released: 10 October 2005

M. Pokora originally titled Matt Pokora is the debut album of French R&B singer M. Pokora, released on 2 November 2004.

M. Pokora was forced to change the title to M. Pokora after a lawsuit from French Guadeloupan artist Matt Houston, who claimed using the name "Matt" by Matt Pokora would create confusion and infringe upon his own rights to the name.

== Track listing ==
No.	Title	Length
1.	"Saga 05 (Intro)"	2:16
2.	"Showbiz (The Battle)"	3:11
3.	"Elle me contrôle"	3:46
4.	"Pas sans toi"	4:23
5.	"Vie de star"	3:03
6.	"Señorita"	3:23
7.	"Combien de temps"	3:52
8.	"Tourne pas le dos"	3:26
9.	"Parti trop tôt"	3:26
10.	"L'objet du désir"	3:18
11.	"L'adrénaline"	3:24
12.	"Au rythme de ma voix"	3:49
