= Merci d'être =

Single by M. Pokora

from the album "À la poursuite du bonheur"
- Released: July 2, 2012
- Genre: Pop, reggae
- Length: 3:34 (album version); 3:31 (radio version)
- Label: EMI Music France
- Songwriters: Matt Pokora, Bina, Fred Château
- Producers: Asdorve, Antoine Angelelli

M. Pokora singles chronology
"On est là" (2012)	"Merci d'être" (2012)	"Envole-moi" (2012)

"Merci d'être" is a song performed by French singer M. Pokora. It serves as the third single from Pokora's fifth studio album "À la poursuite du bonheur". It was written by Pokora, Bina and Fred Château and produced by Asdorve and Antoine Angelelli. It is a midtempo song, with strong elements of reggae music. Lyrically, it is a tribute for women around the world. The song has charted on the Belgium Singles Chart and on the French Singles Chart.

== Background ==
After releasing "On est là" as the second single from his fifth studio album "À la Poursuite du Bonheur", Pokora revealed through his Twitter account that "Merci d'être" was going to be the third single.

"Merci d'être" was written by Pokora, Bina and Fred Château and produced by Asdorve and Antoine Angelelli. Similar to "On est là", it was slightly change for the single version. The version was uploaded on his YouTube account. The song is a tribute to all women around the world, who bear the brunt of the world with their simple arms.

Pokora commented about the song, saying:

"I think this song is a tribute because we talk about different cultures and civilizations. Every woman that we take as an example with its difficulties, we see them carry everything at arm's length. What I meant is that we men, we would be unable to make a quarter of what they do, live and suffer with the same anxieties that are not the same as a man. It's one of my favorite on this album".

== Track listing ==
Digital download

1. Merci d'être (radio version) - 3:31

== Music video ==
The video was filmed at a concert at the Zenith de Lille, on May 31, 2012, during his "À la poursuite du bonheur Tour".

== Chart performance ==
The song debuted on the Belgian Tip Chart at number 47 and has reached number 11, so far. On the French Singles Chart, the song debuted at number 122. It later, climbed from 122 to 85. The song peaked at number 70, in its third week. Later, it fell to number 76.

== Charts ==
Chart (2011–2012)	Peak position
France (SNEP)	55
