= Si tu pars =

Single by M. Pokora

from the album À la poursuite du bonheur
- Released: November 16, 2012
- Genre: Pop
- Length: 3:43 (album version); 3:42 (radio version)
- Label: EMI Music France
- Songwriters: Matt Pokora, Bina, Matthieu Mendès
- Producer: Matthieu Mendès

M. Pokora singles chronology
"Envole-moi" (2012)	"Si tu pars" (2012)

"Si tu pars" is a song performed by French singer M. Pokora. It serves as the fourth single from Pokora's fifth studio album À la poursuite du bonheur. It was written by Pokora, Bina and Matthieu Mendès and produced by Matthieu Mendès.

== Track listing ==
Digital download

1. Si tu pars (radio version) - 3:42

== Charts ==
Chart (2012)	Peak position
Belgium (Ultratip Bubbling Under Wallonia)	16
France (SNEP)	137
