= Le grand show des enfants =

Le grand show des enfants (meaning The great show of children in French) is a French television show broadcast live on French television channel TF1 and presented by Liane Foly. During the live show, the viewers hear a number of songs by French and international artists of the last 50 years as interpreted by children, and they vote solely for the best song rather than on the quality of the performances.

Two shows have been broadcast thus far, the first on 30 October 2010 that was followed by 4,863,000 viewers. The sponsors for the show were Corinne Touzet, Grégoire and Dove Attia. The winning song was "Mon Vieux", a song by Daniel Guichard, and was interpreted by Arthur.

The second show was broadcast on 30 April 2011, exactly six months from the first programme. The sponsors were Jean-Luc Reichmann, Hélène Ségara and Matt Pokora. The winning song was "Memory", a song by Barbra Streisand, and was interpreted by Madeleine.

== Show 1: 30 October 2010 ==
Sponsors

- Corinne Touzet
- Grégoire
- Dove Attia

Songs

(in order of appearance. Winner in bold)

1. "Quelques mots d'amour" from Michel Berger interpreted by Léo et Marina
2. "La java de Broadway" from Michel Sardou interpreted by Clément, Hugo, Sébastien and Léo
3. "Requiem pour un fou" from Johnny Hallyday interpreted by Vincent and Marjolaine
4. **"Mon Vieux" from Daniel Guichard** interpreted by Arthur
5. "I'll Be There" from The Jackson 5 interpreted by Marina
6. "Toi+Moi" from Grégoire interpreted by Juliette and Clément
7. "Le temps qui court" from Alain Chamfort interpreted by Léo and all the group
8. "All by Myself" from Céline Dion interpreted by ...
9. "L'aziza" from Daniel Balavoine interpreted by Clément
10. "Quand on arrive en ville" from Starmania interpreted by Léo, Damien and Jérémy
11. "Mamma Mia" from ABBA interpreted by girls in the group
12. "La vie en rose" from Edith Piaf interpreted by Madeleine

== Show 2: 30 April 2011 ==
Sponsors

- Jean-Luc Reichmann
- Hélène Ségara
- Matt Pokora

Songs

(in order of appearance. Winner in bold)

1. "Comme d'habitude"" from Claude François interpreted by Léo and Inès
2. "Si j'étais président" from Gérard Lenorman interpreted by Clément, Hugo, Vincent and Paul
3. **"Memory" from Barbra Streisand** interpreted by Madeleine
4. "Le Coup de soleil" from Richard Cocciante interpreted by Arthur
5. "Le mal aimé" from Claude François interpreted by Clément
6. "The Show Must Go On" from Queen interpreted by Vincent
7. "Mes emmerdes" from Charles Aznavour interpreted by Léo, Hugo and Clément
8. "Là-bas" from Jean-Jacques Goldman interpreted by Marie and Sébastien
9. "La déclaration d'amour" from France Gall interpreted by Léo and Juliette
10. "Proud Mary" from Tina Turner interpreted by girls in the group
11. "True Colors" from Cyndi Lauper interpreted by Léo and Sonia
