= On est là =

Single by M. Pokora

from the album "À la poursuite du bonheur"
- Released: May 18, 2012
- Genre: Dance-pop
- Length: 3:06 (album version); 2:56 (radio version)
- Label: EMI Music France
- Songwriters: Corneille, Matt Pokora, Matthieu Mendès, Fred Château
- Producer: Asdorve

M. Pokora singles chronology
| "Juste un instant" (2012) | "On est là" (2012) | "Merci d'être" (2012) |

"On est là" (English: Here we Are) is a song performed by the French singer M. Pokora. It is the second single from Pokora's fifth studio album À la poursuite du bonheur. It was written by Pokora, Corneille, Matthieu Mendès and Fred Château and produced by Asdorve. It is an uptempo song, with elements of dance and pop music. Lyrically, in the song, he suggests staying positive about the future. The song charted on the French Singles Chart and on the Belgium Singles Chart.

== Background ==
After releasing "Juste un instant" as the lead single from his fifth studio album À la poursuite du bonheur, Pokora announced that "On est là" was going to be the second single.

It is a dance-pop song, being different from the previous single and the album's soft songs. The song was slightly changed for the single version. The version was uploaded to his YouTube account.

Pokora commented about the song, "It has this side "as the World Cup" as "Waka Waka". It's catchy and there is a real positive message to get across. It's the right state of mind where I am right now. This one, among the "club songs" of the album is the one that I like the most.

== Track listing ==
Digital download

1. On est là (radio version) - 2:56

== Music video ==
The video was shot on the weekend of April 11, 2012, and released on YouTube on May 1, 2012. The video shows Pokora and a lot of people getting together and dancing.

== Chart performance ==
"On est là" debuted on the French Singles Chart at number 164. It later climbed to number 77. It later, jumped to number 48. The following week, it reached number 43. It has reached number 38, so far.

On the Belgian Tip Chart, it debuted at number 23 and climbed to number 18. It has reached number 6.

== Charts ==
| Chart (2011–2012) | Peak position |
|---|---|
| Belgium (Ultratop 50 Wallonia) | 42 |
| France (SNEP) | 38 |
