= Mirage (M. Pokora song) =

Single by M. Pokora

from the album Mise à Jour
- Released: November 22, 2010
- Genre: Electropop, R&B
- Length: 3:10
- Label: EMI Music France
- Songwriters: Matt Pokora; Gee Futuristic
- Producer: Gee Futuristic

M. Pokora singles chronology
| "Juste une photo de toi" (2010) | "Mirage" (2010) | "À nos actes manqués" (2011) |

"Mirage" is a song performed by French singer M. Pokora. It was written by Pokora and co-written and produced by Gee Futuristic. It serves as the second single from Pokora's fourth studio album Mise à Jour. It was released on November 22, 2010.

== Chart performance ==
"Mirage" has been listed for 6 weeks on the France Singles Top 100. It entered the chart on position 72 on week 4/2011, and its last appearance was on week 9/2011. It peaked on number 64, where it stayed for 1 week.

== Music video ==
A music video was released on November 25, 2010 and it shows Pokora dancing with a number of dancers in a studio full of lights.

== Charts ==
| Chart (2011) | Peak position |
|---|---|
| Belgium (Ultratip Bubbling Under Wallonia) | 37 |
| France (SNEP) | 64 |
