= André Tota =

French footballer (born 1950)

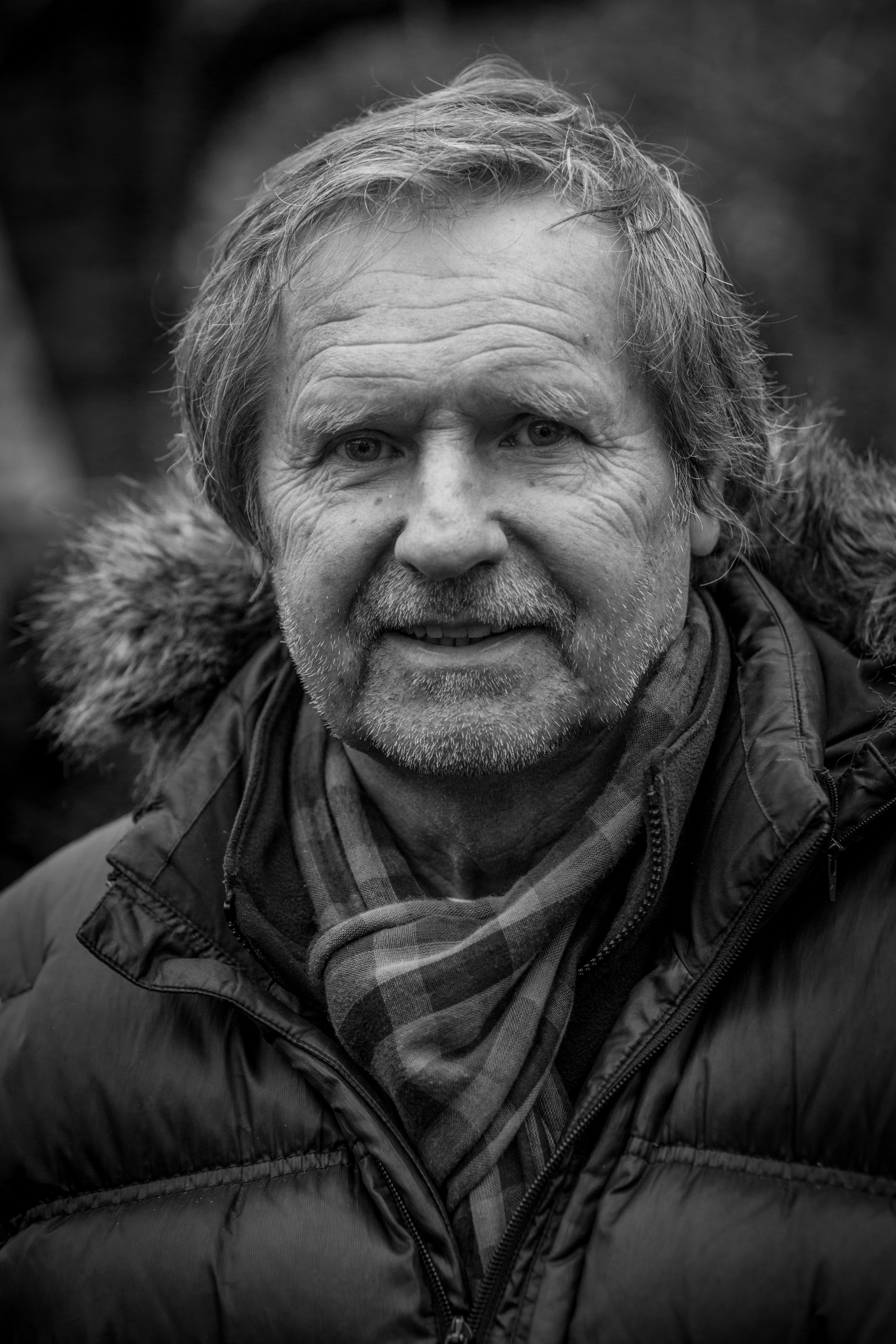
- Tota in 2014

Personal information
- Full name: André Tota
- Date of birth: 9 December 1950 (age 75)
- Place of birth: Briey, France
- Height: 1.77 m (5 ft 10 in)
- Position: Striker

Senior career*
Years	Team	Apps	(Gls)
1971–1976	Metz	69	(11)
1976–1978	Troyes AF	78	(22)
1978–1979	Bordeaux	26	(7)
1979–1983	Toulouse	24	(6)
1983–1984	AS Strasbourg		
- * Club domestic league appearances and goals

André Tota (born 9 December 1950) is a former French footballer who played as a striker.

== Personal life ==
He was born to Polish parents. He is the father of French singer Matt Pokora and Julien with Brigitte Tota.
