= Juste un instant =

Single by M. Pokora

from the album "À la poursuite du bonheur"
- Released: January 30, 2012
- Genre: Pop
- Length: 3:25
- Label: EMI Music France
- Songwriters: Soprano, Matt Pokora, Rachid Mir, Christian Dessart, Matthieu Mendes, Romain Caillard
- Producer: The Bionix

M. Pokora singles chronology
"En attendant la fin" (2011)	"Juste un instant" (2012)	"On est là" (2012)

"Juste un instant (Just a Moment)" is a song performed by French singer M. Pokora. It serves as the lead single from Pokora's fifth studio album "À la poursuite du bonheur". It was released on January 30, 2012. The song has charted on the French Singles Chart and on the Belgian Singles Chart.

== Music video ==
The video was released on YouTube on January 31, 2012. The video tells the story of a girl he wants to win anyway, he walks around the city, calls her attention, monitores and chases her everywhere.

== Chart performance ==
"Juste un instant" debuted on the French Singles Chart at number 33 and peaked at number 18.

== Charts ==
Chart (2011–2012)	Peak position
Belgium (Ultratop 50 Wallonia)	6
France (SNEP)	18
Switzerland (Schweizer Hitparade)	57
