= Yohann Malory =

French singer, songwriter, composer

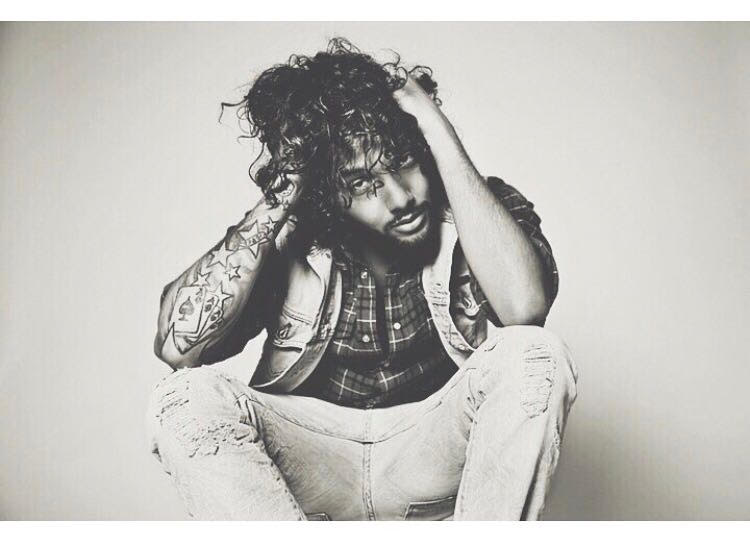

Background information
- Born: January 10, 1985 (age 40)
- Origin: France
- Genres: Pop rock; pop-punk; rock; hip hop; chanson
- Occupations: Singer; songwriter; rapper
- Instrument: Vocals
- Years active: 2006 – present
- Labels: PIAS Group

Yohann Malory better known as Malory (born 10 January 1985) is a French singer, songwriter and rapper.

== Biography ==
Yohann Malory was born in Madagascar and brought up between Madagascar and Thailand. He immigrated to France in 1994 when he was nine. Influenced by hip hop, he started music in 1998 at 13 years old in the collective Récidiviste, and then formed his own group Phenom-n with Sir Kenny, Loey et Lyess.

Spotted by Universal, he published, in 2012, an E.P. carried by the single Entre toi et moi directed by Pierrick Devin (Phoenix, Fortune, Adam Kesher). He collaborates with Brigitte Fontaine on the title Chien de lune, Benjamin Lebeau and William Brière of the group The Shoes on the title Kiss Kiss Bang Bang. He puts to music the text of Frédéric Beigbeder Bribes d'arrestation.

== Discography ==
=== Albums ===
Mon hold-up (2007, RCA Records Label)
No.	Title	Length
1.	"Intro"	2:17
2.	"Juste Pour Le Week End" (ft. Rudy Joseph)	3:29
3.	"Ne me dis pas" (ft. M. Pokora)	3:53
4.	"Hustler Music"	3:31
5.	"Un Moment D'Evasion" (ft. David Lampel)	3:26
6.	"Girlfriend" (ft. Rudy Joseph)	3:35
7.	"Mon Hold Up"	3:25
8.	"Sexy, Fashion Et Classik"	3:23
9.	"Ghetto Girl"	3:23
10.	"Lettre A Coeur Ouvert"	5:08
11.	"Si On Avait Su" (ft. Inês)	3:49
12.	"Groupie Love"	3:37
13.	"Hey Tyron !"	4:16
14.	"Repose En Paix" (ft. Shera Hana)	4:51
15.	"Outro"	1:27
Total length:		53:15

Métropole blues (2020, PIAS Recordings)
No.	Title	Length
1.	"Demain ça ira mieux"	3:19
2.	"Au réveil" (ft. S.Pri Noir)	3:20
3.	"Métropole blues" (Holybrune)	4:02
4.	"Morceaux de toi" (Yseult)	3:21
5.	"Tsunami Amor" (Hok)	2:46
6.	"Téléphone Pacifique"	3:30
7.	"37°2 Le Matin" (Claire Laffut)	3:14
8.	"Sex All Night" (Holybrune)	2:48
9.	"Attrape-cœurs"	3:12
10.	"Margiela Fantôme"	3:36
11.	"Résilience"	2:52
Total length:		36:00

=== EPs ===
Kiss Kiss Bang Bang (2012, Universal)
No.	Title	Length
1.	"Love Me"	3:14
2.	"Entre toi et moi"	3:16
3.	"Est-ce que tu m'aimes encore?"	3:04
4.	"On se sera pas"	3:11
Total length:		12:45
