= Linkup =

French band

- Origin: France
- Genres: Pop
- Years active: 2003–2004
- Label: Universal
- Members: Matthieu Tota; Lionel Tim; Otis
- Website: tadros.com

Linkup was a French boy band, created by the third season of the popular French reality show Popstars, called "Popstars - the Duel" aired on RTL Group TV channel M6 (also known as Métropole 6) in fall 2003. It consisted of Matthieu, Lionel and Otis. Matthieu later became known as singer M. Pokora.

== Career ==
The band released their debut and only album Notre étoile (meaning Our star in French). The debut single from the album, "Mon étoile" (meaning My star in French) was a success, reaching #1 in the French charts.

The following single, Une seconde d'éternité (One second of eternity) and the album didn't find much success. After a collaboration with the English boy band Blue in recording the single "You & Me Bubblin", which also failed to attract enough sales, Linkup disbanded in 2004.

== After break-up ==
- Matthieu Tota, former charismatic leader of the band, started a solo career under the name Matt Pokora and after, M. Pokora.
- In spring of 2005, Lionel Tim was one of the finalists to represent France in the Eurovision Song Contest but Ortal was chosen instead. In 2005-2006, Lionel released two singles "Je m'envole" followed by "Vivre avec toi" (French version of Taylor Hicks' Just to Feel That Way) with achieved moderate success.

== Discography ==
=== Studio albums ===
Year	Album	Peak positions		Certification
Year	Album	FR	SWI	Certification
2003	Notre étoile	3	53	

=== Singles ===
Year	Single	Peak positions			Certification	Album	Music video
Year	Single	FR	BEL (Wa)	SWI	Certification	Album	Music video
2003	"Mon étoile"	1	21	11		Notre étoile	
2003	"Une seconde d'éternité"	3	–	13		Notre étoile	
2004	"You and Me Bubblin'" (Blue and Linkup)	13	–	–		Non-album release	
