= Showbiz (The Battle) =

Single by Matt Pokora

from the album M. Pokora
- Released: 15 November 2004
- Recorded: 2004
- Genre: Crunk
- Length: 3:10
- Label: Universal
- Songwriters: Georges Padey, Kore & Skalp, M. Pokora and Da Team
- Producer: Kore & Skalp

Matt Pokora singles chronology
| "Showbiz (The Battle)" (2004) | "Elle me contrôle)" (2005) |

"Showbiz (The Battle)" is the debut solo single of French singer M. Pokora, also appearing in the self-titled debut solo album M. Pokora. The single cover credits him as Matt Pokora.

It was released on 15 November 2004 on the ULM label, part of Universal. It was written and composed by Georges Padey, Kore & Skalp, Matthieu Tota (M. Pokora) and Da Team and was produced by Kore & Skalp (Djamel Fezari and Pascal Koeu).

== Track listing ==
1. "Showbiz (The Battle)" (Radio Edit) (3:10)
2. "Showbiz (The Battle)" (Club Version) (4:33)

== Charts ==
| Chart (2004–2005) | Peak position |
|---|---|
| Belgium (Ultratop 50 Wallonia) | 12 |
| France (SNEP) | 10 |
| Switzerland (Schweizer Hitparade) | 19 |
