= Dangerous (M. Pokora song) =

Single by M. Pokora featuring Timbaland and Sebastian

from the album MP3
- B-side: "Don't Give My Love Away"
- Released: 24 January 2008
- Genre: Electropop
- Length: 4:44
- Label: Capitol
- Songwriters: Matthieu Tota; Timothy Mosley; Garland Mosley; James Washington
- Producer: Timbaland

M. Pokora singles chronology
"Mal de guerre" (2006)	"Dangerous" (2008)	"They Talk Shit About Me" (2008)

Timbaland singles chronology
"4 Minutes" (2008)	"Dangerous" (2008)	"Release" (2008)

Sebastian singles chronology
"Cop That Disc" (1994)	"Dangerous" (2008)	"Hey Lil Lady" (2009)

Music video
- "Dangerous" on YouTube

"Dangerous" is the first single from French singer M. Pokora's third album MP3. The song was produced by Timbaland and features Timbaland and his younger brother, Sebastian.

Presented in preview during the ceremony of the 2008 NRJ Music Awards, the single was released on 24 January 2008, two days before the release of the album. It went straight to number one in France in the first week, selling 5,674 units that week, but achieved a moderate success in other countries in which it was released. However, it was a top three hit in Belgium (Wallonia), reaching number two in its seventh week.

M. Pokora started to receive attention in North American countries like Mexico, where the video for "Dangerous" was in heavy rotation on MTVLA North and MTVLA Center.

== Track listings ==
CD single

1. "Dangerous" (featuring Timbaland and Sebastian) — 4:44
2. "Don't Give My Love Away" (featuring Ryan Leslie) — 3:36

Digital download

1. "Dangerous" (featuring Timbaland and Sebastian) — 4:44

== Charts ==
=== Peak positions ===
Chart (2008)	Peak position
Australian ARIA Singles Chart	55
Belgian (Wallonia) Singles Chart	2
Czech Republic IFPI Top 100	19
European Hot 100	7
Finnish Singles Chart	16
French SNEP Singles Chart	1
French Digital Chart	19
German Top 100	32
Swedish Singles Chart	15
Swiss Singles Chart	28
Turkey Top 20 Chart	18

=== Year-end charts ===
Chart (2008)	Position
Belgian (Wallonia) Singles Chart	35
Eurochart Hot 100	74
French Singles Chart	55
