= My Way (M. Pokora album) =

Studio album by M. Pokora
- Released: 21 October 2016
- Recorded: 2015–2016
- Genre: French pop
- Label: Sony Records

M. Pokora chronology
R.E.D. (Rythmes Extrêmement Dangereux) (2015)	My Way (2016)	Pyramide (2019)

Singles from My Way
- 1. "Cette année-là" Released: 26 August 2016; 2. "Belinda" Released: 10 October 2016; 3. "Comme d'habitude" Released: 8 December 2016; 4. "Alexandrie, Alexandra" Released: 16 February 2017; 5. "Toi et le soleil" Released: 2 June 2017

My Way is a studio album by French singer M. Pokora, released in 2016. It is a tribute album to French singer Claude François, also known as Cloclo, reinterpreting twelve of his songs. It was released on 21 October 2016 and went straight to number 1 on SNEP, the official French Albums chart in its initial week of release. "Cette année-là", being a famous French remake of "December, 1963 (Oh, What a Night)" from The Four Seasons, was the debut single from the album.

== Track listing ==
No.	Title	Length
1.	"Cette année-là"	3:39
2.	"Alexandrie, Alexandra"	3:37
3.	"Je vais à Rio"	3:20
4.	"Belinda"	3:04
5.	"Belles ! Belles ! Belles !"	2:48
6.	"C'est la même chanson"	3:09
7.	"Soudain il ne reste qu'une chanson"	3:19
8.	"Toi et le soleil"	3:51
9.	"17 ans"	3:55
10.	"Magnolias for ever"	4:39
11.	"Comme d'habitude"	4:21
12.	"Alexandrie, Alexandra (version disco)"	4:14
13.	"Reste (Collector's version & Deluxe version)"	3:06
14.	"Même si tu revenais (Collector's version & Deluxe version)"	2:38
15.	"J'attendrai (Deluxe version only)"	2:58
16.	"My Way (Deluxe version only)"	3:44
Total length:		56:27

== Charts ==
=== Weekly charts ===
Chart (2016)	Peak position
Belgian Albums (Ultratop Flanders)	107
Belgian Albums (Ultratop Wallonia)	1
French Albums (SNEP)	1
Swiss Albums (Schweizer Hitparade)	7

=== Year-end charts ===
Chart (2016)	Position
Belgian Albums (Ultratop Wallonia)	7
French Albums (SNEP)	143

Chart (2017)	Position
Belgian Albums (Ultratop Wallonia)	18
French Albums (SNEP)	29
