= Pyramide (album) =

Studio album by M. Pokora
- Released: 12 April 2019
- Recorded: 2018–2019
- Genre: French pop, Urban pop, R&B, electropop
- Label: TF1 Entertainment / Sony Music
- Producer: M. Pokora, Renaud Rebillaud, Joe Rafaa, Slimane, "KZ", "Kyu Steed", "Haze"

M. Pokora chronology
My Way (2015)	Pyramide (2019)

Singles from My Way
- 1. "Les planètes" Released: 5 March 2019; 2. "Ouh na na" Released: April 2019; 3. "Tombé" Released: 12 June 2019; 4. "Si t'es pas là" Released: 29 November 2019; 5. "Danse avec moi" Released: 12 June 2020; 6. "Si on disait" Released: 25 September 2020; 7. "S'en aller" Released: 20 October 2020

Pyramide is a studio album by French singer M. Pokora, released in 2019. The album has been certified triple platinum in France for sales of 300,000 copies.

A re-edited album with additional songs was released on 8 November 2019, and an "ultimate" re-edited version on 4 December 2020.

== Track listing ==
CD

1. "Pyramide" - 2:55
2. "Les planètes" 3:50
3. "Ouh na na" - 3:02
4. "Seul" 2:55
5. "La regarder s'en aller" 3:26
6. "Alter ego" 3:55
7. "California Sunset" 4:14
8. "Effacé" - 3:22
9. "Barrio" - 3:22
10. "Perdu" - 3:05
11. "Tombé" - 3:53
12. "L'amour vs l'amitié" - 3:45
13. "Two Left Feet" - 3:29

LP

LP 1:

1. "Pyramide" - 2:55
2. "Les planètes" - 3:50
3. "Ouh na na" - 3:02
4. "Seul" - 2:55
5. "La regarder s'en aller" - 3:26
6. "Alter ego" - 3:55
7. "California Sunset" - 4:14
8. "Effacé" - 3:22

LP 2:

1. "Barrio" - 3:22
2. "Perdu" - 3:05
3. "Tombé" - 3:53
4. "L'amour vs l'amitié" - 3:45
5. "Two Left Feet" - 3:29
6. "Sommet" - 3:09
7. "Pour nous" - 3:01
8. "Douleur" - 3:19

Digital

1. "Pyramide" - 2:55
2. "Les planètes" 3:50
3. "Ouh na na" - 3:02
4. "Seul" 2:55
5. "La regarder s'en aller" 3:26
6. "Alter ego" 3:55
7. "California Sunset" 4:14
8. "Effacé" - 3:22
9. "Barrio" - 3:22
10. "Perdu" - 3:05
11. "Tombé" - 3:53
12. "L'amour vs l'amitié" - 3:45
13. "Two Left Feet" - 3:29
14. "Sommet" - 3:09
15. "Pour nous" - 3:01
16. "Douleur - 3:19

Extras: DVD with the documentary À l'intérieur de la Pyramide - 13 minutes

Re-release (8 November 2019)

1. "Pyramide" - 2:55
2. "Les planètes" 3:50
3. "Ouh na na" - 3:02
4. "Seul" 2:55
5. "La regarder s'en aller" 3:26
6. "Alter ego" 3:55
7. "California Sunset" 4:14
8. "Effacé" - 3:22
9. "Barrio" - 3:22
10. "Tombé" - 3:53
11. "L'amour vs l'amitié" - 3:45
12. "Two Left Feet" - 3:29
13. "Sommet" - 3:09
14. "Douleur" - 3:20
15. "Tango électrique" - 3:01
16. "Si t'es pas là" - 3:53
17. "Comme des fous" - 2:43
18. "Danse avec moi" - 2:53
19. "Zizizaza" (feat. Megz) - 2:50
20. "Mama" - 3:13
21. "Les planètes" (feat. Philippine - Les planètes [#MPPlanètesChallenge]) - 3:52

Ultimate Re-release (4 December 2020)

1. "Pyramide" - 2:55
2. "Les planètes" 3:50
3. "Ouh na na" - 3:02
4. "Seul" 2:55
5. "La regarder s'en aller" 3:26
6. "Alter ego" 3:55
7. "California Sunset" 4:14
8. "Effacé" - 3:22
9. "Barrio" - 3:22
10. "Tombé" - 3:53
11. "L'amour vs l'amitié" - 3:45
12. "Two Left Feet" - 3:29
13. "Sommet" - 3:09
14. "Douleur" - 3:20
15. "Tango électrique" - 3:01
16. "Si t'es pas là" - 3:53
17. "Comme des fous" - 2:43
18. "Danse avec moi" - 2:53
19. "Zizizaza" (feat. Megz) - 2:50
20. "Mama" - 3:13
21. "Les planètes" (feat. Philippine - Les planètes [#MPPlanètesChallenge]) - 3:52
22. "Si on disait" - 3:07
23. "Demain" - 2:48
24. "Incendie" - 3:05
25. "S'en aller" - 3:05
26. "Se revoir" - 3:27
27. "Si on disait" [Remix] (feat. Dadju) - 3:10

== Charts ==
=== Weekly charts ===
Chart (2019)	Peak position
Belgian Albums (Ultratop Flanders)	123
Belgian Albums (Ultratop Wallonia)	1
French Albums (SNEP)	1
Swiss Albums (Schweizer Hitparade)	8

=== Year-end charts ===
Chart (2019)	Position
Belgian Albums (Ultratop Wallonia)	5
French Albums (SNEP)	14

Chart (2020)	Position
Belgian Albums (Ultratop Wallonia)	28
French Albums (SNEP)	35

Chart (2021)	Position
Belgian Albums (Ultratop Wallonia)	152
French Albums (SNEP)	168

== Certifications ==
Region	Certification	Certified units/sales
Belgium (BRMA)	Gold	10,000^{‡}
France (SNEP)	3× Platinum	300,000^{‡}
^{‡} Sales+streaming figures based on certification alone.
