= Juste une photo de toi =

Single by M. Pokora

from the album Mise à jour
- Released: June 7, 2010
- Genre: Pop, R&B
- Length: 3:51
- Label: EMI Music France
- Songwriter(s): M. Pokora
- Producer(s): Gee Futuristic, X-Plosive

M. Pokora singles chronology
"Through the Eyes" (2009)	"Juste une photo de toi" (2010)	"Mirage" (2011)

Music video
- "Juste une photo de toi" on YouTube

"Juste une photo de toi" (English: Just a picture of you) is a song performed by French singer M. Pokora. Produced by Gee Futuristic & X-Plosive, the song serves as the lead single from Pokora's fourth studio album Mise à Jour. It was released on June 7, 2010.

== Charts ==
Chart (2011)	Peak position
Belgium (Ultratop 50 Wallonia)	27
France (SNEP)	44
Switzerland (Schweizer Hitparade)	75

== Release history ==
Country	Date	Format
France	June 7, 2010	CD, Digital download
Italy	June 7, 2010	Digital download
Poland	February 2011	
