= À la poursuite du bonheur =

Studio album by M. Pokora
- Released: 19 March 2012
- Recorded: 2011–2012
- Genre: Pop, R&B
- Label: EMI France
- Producer: The Bionix; Corneille Nyungura; Matthieu Mendes; Joe Rafaa, Sofia de Medeiros; Julien Comblat; GEE Futuristic; Francisco [FR]; Asdorve; Antoine Angelelli

M. Pokora chronology
Mise à jour (2010)	À la poursuite du bonheur (2012)	À La Poursuite Du Bonheur Tour - Live à Bercy (2013)

Singles from À la poursuite du bonheur
- 1. "Juste un instant" Released: 30 January 2012; 2. "On est là" Released: 19 April 2012; 3. "Merci d'être" Released: 2 July 2012; 4. "Si tu pars" Released: 16 November 2012

À la poursuite du bonheur (meaning In pursuit of happiness) is the fifth studio album by French singer M. Pokora, released on March 19, 2012. The album sees Matt working with previous producers such as The Bionix, GEE Futurisc, but with a range of new producers, such as Matthieu Mendes Corneille, Asdove and more, creating a more relaxed, pop music, instead of the dance-oriented and urban tracks from his previous albums. The lead single "Juste un instant" was released on 30 January 2012. The song "On est là" was the second single, while "Merci D'être" was the third single. The album sold 69.000 copies, within three weeks of release. It was certified Platinum and has sold 140.000 copies, so far. The album will be re-released and it will feature 2 new songs, one of them is a duet with French recording artist Tal.

Following the release of the album, he engaged on a tour called after the album À la poursuite du bonheur Tour (abbreviated as ALPBT).

== Background ==
Eschewing the electro R&B of his first international release, 2010's Mise à Jour, for a more emotive soul-pop sound, A la Poursuite du Bonheur is the fifth solo album from French pop artist M. Pokora. Produced by regular cohorts Gee Futuristic and the Bionix, its 14 tracks feature songs penned by rapper Soprano ("Juste un Instant") and German-Rwandan vocalist Corneille ("Le Temps Qu'il Faut") alongside the single "On Est Là."

=== Critical reception ===
Professional ratings
Review scores
Source	Rating
Charts in France	3/5 stars
Krinein Music	(4/10)
Music Story	3/5 stars

The album received generally favorable reviews from music critics. Jonathan Hamard from "Charts in France" gave to the album 3 out of 5 stars, writing: "Mr. Pokora surprises with his new album "À la poursuite du bonheur". The artist is moving in the right direction. A few titles stand out, both musically and textually, but his words do not always live up to its claims. Overall, "À la poursuite du bonheur" is guaranteed to have a good time." Paula Haddah from "Music Story" also gave to the album 3 out of 5 stars, writing: "This album even if it is more consistent than his previous, but it still contains many tracks that truism was called ("Cours", "Mourir ce Soir", "Le temps qu’il faut". The rest consists of securities dancefloor calibrated for the stage, where the artist is expected ("Danse sur ma Musique", "Encore + fort", "Mes rêveurs"). Overall, his voice is less trafficked, which spares us the nasal sound of machinery. This disc will conquer new and old fans of MP that have not reached their majority. Others have already left to pursue happiness elsewhere." Guillaume from "Krinein Music" gave to the album 4 out of 10, writing a mixed review, stating that "you can not listen to the album doing other things at the same time. Otherwise it completely obscures the music."

== Track listing ==
No.	Title	Writer(s)	Producer(s)	Length
1.	"Juste un Instant"	Soprano, Matt Pokora, Rachid Mir, Christian Dessart, Matthieu Mendès, Romain Caillard	The Bionix	3:25
2.	"Cours"	Matt Pokora, Bina, Matthieu Mendès, Tiery-F	The Bionix	3:22
3.	"Mourir ce soir"	Matt Pokora, Joe Rafaa, Django Jack	Matthieu Mendès, Joe Rafaa	4:03
4.	"Le temps qu'il faut"	Corneille, Marco Volcy	Corneille Nyungura, Sofia de Medeiros	3:37
5.	"Encore + fort"	Matt Pokora, Michel Marteen, The Bionix	Mr Cue	3:04
6.	"Chacun"	Julien Comblat, Pierre Comblat, Samir Ben Messaoud	Julien Comblat	3:31
7.	"Reste comme tu es"	Matt Pokora, Bina, Matthieu Mendès	Matthieu Mendes	3:37
8.	"Si tu pars"	Matt Pokora, Bina, Matthieu Mendès	Matthieu Mendes	3:43
9.	"Sauve-toi"	Matt Pokora, Davide Esposito, Bina	Matthieu Mendes	3:23
10.	"Danse sur ma musique"	Brisk Fingaz, GEE Futuristic, Christian Fleps, Francisco [FR], Django Jack	Brisk Fingaz, GEE Futuristic, Christian Fleps, Francisco [FR]	3:09
11.	"Mes rêveurs"	Matt Pokora, Romain Caillard, Django Jack	The Bionix	3:20
12.	"Mon évidence"	Matt Pokora, Bina, Matthieu Mendès	Matthieu Mendes	4:01
13.	"On est là"	Corneille, Matt Pokora, Matthieu Mendès, Fred Château	Asdorve	3:06
14.	"Merci d'être"	Matt Pokora, Bina, Fred Château	Asdorve, Antoine Angelelli	3:33
15.	"Ma poupée"	Matt Pokora, Olivier Reine, Michel Marteen	Julien Comblat	3:18

Re-release
No.	Title	Writer(s)	Length
16.	"Plus haut"	Matthieu Mendès
17.	"Envole-moi" (with Tal)	Jean-Jacques Goldman
18.	"Je voudrais vous dire"
19.	"Je serai là"
20.	"Hallelujah"	Leonard Cohen

== Charts ==
=== Weekly charts ===
Chart (2012)	Peak position
Belgian Albums (Ultratop Wallonia)	2
French Albums (SNEP)	2
Swiss Albums (Schweizer Hitparade)	12

=== Year-end charts ===
Chart (2012)	Position
Belgian Albums (Ultratop Wallonia)	6
French Albums (SNEP)	10

Chart (2013)	Position
Belgian Albums (Ultratop Wallonia)	15
French Albums (SNEP)	99

=== Certifications ===
Region	Certification	Certified units/sales
France (SNEP)	3× Platinum	300,000^{*}
Belgium (BRMA)	Platinum	30,000^{*}
^{*} Sales figures based on certification alone.

== See also ==
- À La Poursuite Du Bonheur Tour - Live à Bercy
