= R.E.D. (Rythmes Extrêmement Dangereux) =

R.E.D. - Rythmes Extrêmement Dangereux

Studio album by M. Pokora
- Released: 6 February 2015
- Recorded: 2014–2015
- Genre: French pop
- Length: 48:58
- Label: Parlophone, Warner Music France

M. Pokora chronology
À La Poursuite Du Bonheur Tour - Live à Bercy (2014)	R.E.D. - Rythmes Extrêmement Dangereux (2015)	My Way (2016)

Singles from R.E.D. - Rythmes Extrêmement Dangereux
- 1. "On danse" Released: 2014; 2. "Le Monde" Released: 2014; 3. "Mieux que nous (feat. Soprano)" Released: 2015; 4. "Voir la nuit s'emballer" Released: 2015

R.E.D. (Rythmes Extrêmement Dangereux) is the sixth studio album by French singer M. Pokora.

== Track list ==
1. "Intro R.E.D." (1:12)
2. "Avant nous" (3:13)
3. "Voir la nuit s'emballer" (4:02)
4. "Le monde" (3:14)
5. "Mieux que nous" (feat. Soprano) (4:24)
6. "Go Mama" (3:06)
7. "J'le fais quand même" (2:49)
8. "Wohoo" (3:21)
9. "Entre parenthèses" (3:20)
10. "Je te mentirais" (3:54)
11. "Ensemble" (3:08)
12. "On danse" (3:14)
13. "Cœur voyageur" (3:19)
14. "Ma jolie" (3:41)
15. "Le monde" (Acoustique) (3:25)

== Charts ==
=== Weekly charts ===
Chart (2015)	Peak position
Belgian Albums (Ultratop Flanders)	67
Belgian Albums (Ultratop Wallonia)	1
French Albums (SNEP)	1
Swiss Albums (Schweizer Hitparade)	4

=== Year-end charts ===
Chart (2015)	Position
Belgian Albums (Ultratop Wallonia)	9
French Albums (SNEP)	17
