= MP3 (M. Pokora album) =

Studio album by M. Pokora
- Released: 24 March 2008
- Recorded: 2007
- Genre: R&B, pop, dance-pop, hip hop, electropop
- Length: 62:00
- Label: EMI France
- Producer: Timbaland, Ryan Leslie, Pete "Boxsta" Martin, The Bionix, Kore, Jim Beanz, Tarz, C. Dessart, R. Mir, Pete Martin, Jordan Houyez, M. Kool L.

M. Pokora chronology
Player (2006)	MP3 (2008)	Mise à Jour (2010)

Singles from MP3
- 1. "Dangerous" Released: 24 January 2008; 2. "They Talk Shit About Me" Released: 9 June 2008; 3. "Catch Me If You Can" Released: 30 July 2008; 4. "Through the Eyes" Released: February 2009

MP3 is M. Pokora's third studio album, which was released on 24 March 2008 in France. The album is available in three editions: original, limited, and collector's. The limited edition contains two bonus tracks, and the collector's edition comes with a lanyard, poster and four badges.

Timbaland and Ryan Leslie participated in this album. Recorded in Los Angeles, most tracks are in English, except two which are in French. The bonus tracks on the limited edition are the English version of the two French songs. During the interview with hitparade.ch, M. Pokora stated that French limited himself and his music from being internationally spread, although the album does not directly aim for his international career.

== Track listing ==
#	Title	Producers / Writers / Composers	Length
1	"Dangerous" (featuring Timbaland and Sebastian)	Timbaland; Garland Mosley, Tim Mosley, M. Pokora, J. Beanz; Garland Mosley, Tim Mosley, M. Pokora, J. Beanz, H. Lane	4:44
2	"Catch Me If You Can"	Timbaland; Tim Mosley, M. Pokora, J. Beanz; Tim Mosley, M. Pokora, J. Beanz	3:32
3	"Don't Give My Love Away" (featuring Ryan Leslie)	R. Leslie; M. Pokora, R. Leslie; M. Pokora, R. Leslie	3:35
4	"No Me Without U"	Timbaland; Tim Mosley, M. Pokora, J. Beanz; Tim Mosley, M. Pokora, J. Beanz, H. Lane	3:35
5	"Treason"	J. R. Rotem; Guy Chambers, J. R. Rotem, E. Kidd Bogart; Guy Chambers, J. R. Rotem, E. Kidd Bogart	3:36
6	"Internationalude"	C. Dessart, R. Mir; M. Pokora, C. Dessart, R. Mir; M. Pokora, C. Dessart, R. Mir	1:48
7	"Tokyo Girl"	R. Leslie; M. Pokora, R. Leslie; M. Pokora, R. Leslie	3:20
8	"They Talk Shit About Me" (featuring Verbz)	Pete Martin, M. Kool L.; M. Pokora, Pete Martin, Natalia Cappuccini; M. Pokora, Pete Martin, Natalia Cappuccini	3:20
9	"Quitte à me jouer" (featuring Kore)	Kore; M. Pokora, Black Kent, Akuavi; Kore, M. Pokora, Aurélien Mazin, Bellek	3:32
10	"Forbidden Drive"	Tarz; Aikiu, P. Laugier; M. Pokora, Tarz	3:45
11	"Climax"	C. Dessart, R. Mir; M. Pokora, C. Dessart, R. Mir; M. Pokora, C. Dessart, R. Mir	5:27
12	"Why Do You Cry?"	Timbaland, Jim Beanz; Tim Mosley, M. Pokora, Jim Beanz; Tim Mosley, M. Pokora, Jim Beanz, H. Lane	3:33
13	"Like a Criminal"	Timbaland; Tim Mosley, M. Pokora, J. Beanz; Tim Mosley, M. Pokora, J. Beanz, H. Lane	3:42
14	"Sur ma route"	Pete Martin, Jordan Houyez, M. Kool L.; Jack Robinson; M. Pokora, Jordan Houyez	5:23
15	"I Loved You" (featuring Kore; bonus track)	Kore; M. Pokora, Black Kent, Akuavi; Kore, M. Pokora, Aurélien Mazin, Bellek	3:32
16	"Through the Eyes" (bonus track)	Pete Martin, Jordan Houyez, M. Kool L.; Jack Robinson; M. Pokora, Jordan Houyez	5:23

== Charts ==
Chart (2008)	Peak position
Belgian (Wallonia) Albums Chart	6
French Digital Chart	10
French Albums Chart	7
Polish Albums (ZPAV)	22
Swiss Albums Chart	32

== Release history ==
Country	Date
France	24 March 2008
Spain	6 May 2008
Germany	30 May 2008
Italy	13 June 2008
Poland	23 June 2008
Japan	24 June 2008
United States	22 July 2008
Australia	4 October 2008
