= Elle me contrôle =

Single by M. Pokora

from the album M. Pokora
- Released: April 2005
- Songwriters: Georges Padey, Kore & Skalp, Matt Pokora, Da Team, Sweety
- Producer: Kore & Skalp

M. Pokora singles chronology
"Showbiz (The Battle)" (2004)	"Elle me contrôle" (2005)	"Pas sans toi" (2005)

"Elle me contrôle" is a song by French singer M. Pokora written and composed by Georges Padey, Kore & Skalp, Matt Pokora, Da Team and Sweety. It was released as the second single from his first album in late spring 2005. Rapper Sweety features in the Kore & Skalp–produced song. It won the NRJ Music Award for "Francophone Song of the Year" in 2006.

In 2015, the song saw a revival with a new version released by M. Pokora featuring Tenny.

== Track listings ==
CD 1 (green cover)

1. "Elle me contrôle (feat. Sweety)"
2. "Showbiz (The Battle)" live performance @ Génération Rap/RnB 2 in Bercy

CD 2 (red cover)

1. "Elle me contrôle (feat. Sweety)"
2. "Elle me contrôle" music video

== Music video ==
The music video for "Elle me contrôle" was directed by Karim Ouaret. It won the NRJ Music Award for "Music Video of the Year" in 2006.

== Charts and sales ==
=== Peak positions ===
Chart (2005)	Peak position
Belgian (Wallonia) Singles Chart	11
French SNEP Singles Chart	6
Swiss Singles Chart	23

=== Year-end charts ===
Chart (2005)	Position
Belgian (Wallonia) Singles Chart	52
French Airplay Chart	32
French Singles Chart	59
French TV Airplay Chart	7

=== Certifications ===
Country	Certification	Date	Sales certified	Physical sales
France	Silver	1 December 2005	125,000	109,050

=== Awards ===
Awards
NRJ Music Awards 2006
Francophone song of the year
