= Mise à jour =

Studio album by M. Pokora
- Released: 23 August 2010
- Recorded: 2009–2010
- Genre: Pop, R&B
- Length: 51:13 (standard edition); 79:18 (deluxe edition)
- Label: EMI France
- Producer: Trak Invaders, The Bionix, Wayne Beckford, Gee Futuristic, X-Plosive, Astroboyz, STX, Olivier Reine

M. Pokora chronology
MP3 (2008)	Mise à jour (2010)	À La Poursuite Du Bonheur (2012)

Singles from Mise à Jour
- 1. "Juste une photo de toi" Released: 7 June 2010; 2. "Mirage" Released: 12 November 2010; 3. "En attendant la fin" Released: 17 October 2011

Mise à jour is the fourth studio album by French singer M. Pokora, released on 23 August 2010. The lead single "Juste une photo de toi" was released on June 7.

The second French edition of the album entitled Mise à Jour Version 2.0 provided another single, "À nos actes manqués", which achieved success in France and Belgium.

The international edition of Mise à Jour entitled Updated contains English versions of the album and was released on 14 March 2011.

== Track listing ==
Mise à jour track listing
No.	Title	Writer(s)	Producer(s)	Length
1.	"Juste une photo de toi"	M. Pokora	Gee Futuristic & X-Plosive	3:52
2.	"Mr & Mrs Smith" (featuring Eva Simons)	M. Pokora, Tyron Carter, Eva Simons, P.A. Melki	Astroboyz (Tom Grégoire & P.A. Melki)	3:18
3.	"1, 2, 3"	M. Pokora & Wayne Beckford	Wayne Beckford	3:33
4.	"Mirage"	M. Pokora, Francisco	Gee Futuristic	3:10
5.	"Elle veut jouer"	M. Pokora & The Bionix	The Bionix	3:22
6.	"Plus comme avant"	M. Pokora & STX	STX	4:03
7.	"Mise à jour"	M. Pokora, Bina, Francisco	Gee Futuristic & X-Plosive	3:44
8.	"Né pour toi"	M. Pokora, Tom Grégoire & P.A. Melki	Astroboyz (Tom Grégoire & P.A. Melki)	4:39
9.	"Repartir à zéro"	Jango Jack, Romain Epstein, Luc Leroy, Yann Mace, Trak Invaders	Trak Invaders & Jango Jack	3:12
10.	"Toutes sexy"	M. Pokora, Tyron Carter & The Bionix	The Bionix	3:27
11.	"Gogo danseuse" (featuring Asto)	M. Pokora, Francisco	Gee Futuristic	3:47
12.	"Comme un soldat"	M. Pokora, Bina, Tom Grégoire & P.A. Melki	Astroboyz (Tom Grégoire & P.A. Melki)	2:42
13.	"Sauvons ce qu'il nous reste"	Leslie, M. Pokora & Tarz	Tarz	3:49
14.	"En attendant la fin"	Tyron Carter & Olivier Reine	Olivier Reine	4:05
15.	"Gogo danseuse (DJ Mercer Remix)"			3:10

Deluxe edition
No.	Title	Writer(s)	Producer(s)	Length
16.	"Spiderweb"	"Francisco"	Gee Futuristic & X-Plosive	3:52
17.	"All So Sexy" ("Toutes sexy" English version)	Francisco, M. Pokora & The Bionix	The Bionix	3:34
18.	"Do Anything" ("Gogo danseuse" English version)	M. Pokora, Francisco	Gee Futuristic	3:53
19.	"Finally Found Ya" ("Si on échangeait les rôles" English version)	M. Pokora, Bina, Francisco	Gee Futuristic & X-Plosive	3:57
20.	"Get a Little Closer" ("Mise À jour" English version)	Francisco	Gee Futuristic & X-Plosive	3:41
21.	"Mr & Mrs Smith" (English version)	Ingrid Simons, Mike Hamilton, M. Pokora, Eva Simons, P.A. Melki	Astroboyz (Tom Grégoire & P.A. Melki)	3:18
22.	"Oblivion" ("Mirage" English version)	M. Pokora, Francisco	Gee Futuristic	3:10
23.	"She wants to play" ("Elle veut jouer" English version)	M. Pokora & The Bionix	The Bionix	3:20

=== Charts ===
==== Weekly charts ====
Weekly chart performance for Mise à jour
Chart (2010)	Peak position
Belgian Albums (Ultratop Wallonia)	7
French Albums (SNEP)	4
Polish Albums (ZPAV)	14
Swiss Albums (Schweizer Hitparade)	65

==== Year-end charts ====
Year-end chart performance for Mise à jour
Chart (2010)	Position
French Albums (SNEP)	122
Chart (2011)	Position
Belgian Albums (Ultratop Wallonia)	60
French Albums (SNEP) 2.0	45
Chart (2012)	Position
French Albums (SNEP) 2.0	84

=== Release history ===
Release history and formats for Mise à jour
Country	Date	Format
Germany	20 August 2010	CD, digital download
France	23 August 2010	CD, digital download

== Updated ==
Updated

Studio album by M. Pokora
- Released: 14 March 2011
- Recorded: 2009–2011
- Genre: Pop, R&B
- Label: EMI
- Producer: Trak Invaders, The Bionix, Wayne Beckford, Gee Futuristic, X-Plosive, Astroboyz, STX, Olivier Reine

M. Pokora chronology
Mise à Jour (2010)	Updated (2011)	Mise à Jour Version 2.0 (2011)

Singles from Updated
- 1. "Oblivion" Released: December 2010; 2. "Finally Found Ya" Released: May 2011

Updated is the international version of Mise à Jour released on 14 March 2011 containing English versions of the songs of the album.

Two singles were released from the album: "Oblivion" in December 2010 and "Finally Found Ya" in May 2011

Updated track listing
No.	Title	Writer(s)	Producer(s)	Length
1.	"Get a Little Closer"	Francisco	Gee Futuristic & X-plosive	3:42
2.	"Mr & Mrs Smith" (featuring Eva Simons)	Ingrid Simons, Mike Hamilton, M. Pokora, Eva Simons, P.A. Melki	Astroboyz (Tom Grégoire) & P.A. Melki	3:18
3.	"Oblivion"	M. Pokora, Francisco	Gee Futuristic	3:10
4.	"She Wants to Play"	M. Pokora & The Bionix	The Bionix	3:20
5.	"Spiderweb"	Francisco	Gee Futuristic & X-plosive	3:52
6.	"Nothing"	M. Pokora, Bina	M. Pokora, Julien Tarz	3:19
7.	"Do Anything" (featuring Asto)	M. Pokora, Francisco	Gee Futuristic	3:53
8.	"Turn It Up"	M. Pokora, Bina	Gee Futuristic, X-plosive, The Bionix	4:01
9.	"Hey Girl"	M. Pokora, Bina	M. Pokora, Julien Tarz	5:34
10.	"All So Sexy"	M. Pokora, Francisco, The Bionix	The Bionix	3:34
11.	"Finally Found Ya"	M. Pokora, Bina, Francisco	Gee Futuristic, X-plosive	3:57

== Mise à Jour Version 2.0 ==
Mise à Jour Version 2.0

Studio album by M. Pokora
- Released: 14 April 2011
- Recorded: 2009–2011
- Genre: Pop, R&B
- Label: EMI France
- Producer: Trak Invaders, The Bionix, Wayne Beckford, Gee Futuristic, X-Plosive, Astroboyz, STX, Olivier Reine

M. Pokora chronology
Updated (2011)	Mise à Jour Version 2.0 (2011)

Singles from Mise à Jour Version 2.0
- 1. "À nos actes manqués" Released: April 2011

On 14 April 2011 many months of the release of the initial album on 23 August 2010, M. Pokora released Mise à jour Version 2.0 and as a physical release starting 18 April 2011. Visually the CD was dubbed "the blue version" with the original August 2010 dubbed "the green version".

Version 2.0 contains the full 14 titles of the standard version, but also "À nos actes manqués", a remake of a Goldman/Fredericks/Jones classic, the yet unpublished "Si on échangeait les rôles", and three songs in English taken from the album Updated.

Version 2.0 track listing
No.	Title	Length
1.	"Juste une photo de toi"	3:52
2.	"Mr & Mrs Smith" (featuring Eva Simons)	3:18
3.	"1, 2, 3"	3:32
4.	"Mirage"	3:10
5.	"Elle veut jouer"	3:22
6.	"Plus comme avant"	4:02
7.	"Mise à jour"	3:43
8.	"Né pour toi"	4:38
9.	"Repartir à zéro"	3:11
10.	"Toutes sexy"	3:26
11.	"Gogo danseuse" (featuring Asto)	3:46
12.	"Comme un soldat"	2:41
13.	"Sauvons ce qu'il nous reste"	3:48
14.	"En attendant la fin"	4:02
15.	"À nos actes manqués"	3:45
16.	"Turn It Up"	4:02
17.	"Hey Girl"	5:35
18.	"Nothing"	3:20
19.	"Si on échangeait les rôles"	3:31
20.	"Gogo danseuse" (featuring Asto; DJ Mercier remix)	3:09
