= Player (M. Pokora album) =

Studio album by M. Pokora
- Released: 26 January 2006
- Recorded: 2005
- Genre: R&B, hip hop, pop, crunk
- Producer: The Bionix, D-Town, Doc Ness & E-Rise

M. Pokora chronology
M. Pokora (2004)	Player (2006)	MP3 (2008)

Singles from M. Pokora
- 1. "De Retour" Released: 13 January 2006; 2. "It's Alright" Released: March 2006; 3. "Oh La La La (Sexy Miss)" Released: June 2006; 4. "Mal de Guerre" Released: November 2006

Player is the second album by French pop/R&B singer M. Pokora which was released on 26 January 2006 in France. The album debuted at number one on the French charts in the first week.

== Track listing ==
No.	Title	Length
1.	"De retour" (featuring Tyron Carter)	3:30
2.	"Player"	2:50
3.	"Oh la la la (Sexy Miss)" (featuring Red Rat)	3:01
4.	"Ce soir je lui dis tout"	3:51
5.	"Mal de guerre"	3:56
6.	"L'enfer du samedi soir" (featuring Zoxea)	4:08
7.	"Interlude (Cynthia)"	1:01
8.	"Cynthia"	2:51
9.	"STP"	3:29
10.	"Cette Fille"	3:14
11.	"Regarde maman / Je suis prêt pour la bataille" (hidden track)	3:29

French limited edition
No.	Title	Length
12.	"Oh"/Je suis prêt pour la bataille" (with Ciara) (bonus track)	12:00

Re-release (August 18, 2006)
No.	Title	Length
12.	"Celle"	3:18
13.	"It's Alright" (with Ricky Martin) (bonus track)	3:22

=== Alternate additions ===
- The first edition featured a limited edition calendar and the bonus track "Oh! (feat. Ciara)".
- The album was later re-released and included the bonus track "Celle" and "It's Alright", a duet with Ricky Martin.
- A few months later, the second edition of the album was re-released again with the previously released DVD "Un an avec M. Pokora" (A year with M. Pokora).

== Charts ==
=== Weekly charts ===
Chart (2006)	Peak position
Belgian Albums (Ultratop Wallonia)	8
French Albums (SNEP)	1
Swiss Albums (Schweizer Hitparade)	37

=== Year-end charts ===
Chart (2006)	Position
Belgian Albums (Ultratop Wallonia)	41
French Albums (SNEP)	30
