= M. Pokora =

French singer (born 1985)

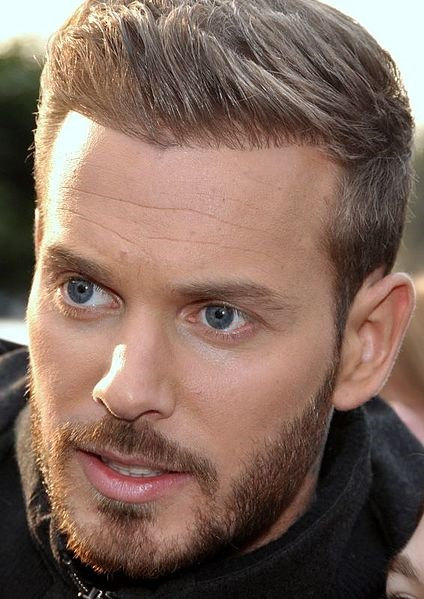
- M. Pokora in 2013

Background information
- Also known as: MP
- Born: Matthieu Tota; 26 September 1985 (age 40)
- Origin: Strasbourg, France
- Genres: Pop, R&B, dance
- Occupations: Singer, songwriter, dancer
- Years active: 2003–present
- Labels: EMI France; Universal Music France
- Formerly of: Linkup
- Spouse: Christina Milian (m. 2020)
- Website: mpokoramusic.fr

Matthieu Tota (French pronunciation: [matjø tɔta]; born 26 September 1985), artistically known as Matt Pokora and later M. Pokora (/pəˈkɔːrə/), is a French pop singer, songwriter and dancer. He is known for his catchy melodies and smooth vocals. Pokora mostly sings in French but he has also recorded a number of songs in English. In 2016, 2017 and 2025 he served as a coach for The Voice Kids France. He was also a coach in the sixth season of The Voice: la plus belle voix in 2017 alongside Florent Pagny, Mika and Zazie, where his finalist Lisandro Cuxi went on to win the season.

== Early life ==
Matthieu Tota is the son of professional footballer André Tota and Brigitte. His parents divorced in 1998 when he was 13 years old. As a child, he studied in an elementary school in Hohberg, Germany, and later at Collège Paul-Émile Victor in Mundolsheim, and Lycée Aristide Briand in Schiltigheim near Strasbourg. When he was younger, football was his first ambition and he wanted to become a professional player. However, he later opted for music.

Tota explained the origin of his stage name, Matt Pokora, in an interview during the documentary Mise à jour, broadcast on 26 August 2010 on NRJ 12. He said he was searching for an artistic name, and happened to be talking to his grandmother of Polish origin when the importance of humility came up. He asked her "How do we say 'humility' in Polish?", and she replied "pokora". Tota immediately decided to adopt the word as his stage name.

He earned some public attention as a member of French R&B group Mic Unity.

== In Popstars and Linkup ==
In the fall of 2003, Tota participated in the third season of Popstars, a French talent reality television show broadcast on M6. The concept of the program was to present possible candidates, the winners of which would take part in the formation of a boy band or girl band. Tota was a crowd and jury favourite, and became a member of the boy band Linkup, formed with Lionel and Otis, two other winners in 2003 Popstars. The female winners were formed into another group, Diadems, formed of Marylore, Angel, Pookie, Ophélie and Alexandra. In the final showdown, the boy band including Tota won the series over the girl band Diadems, who ended up runners-up.

Linkup's first single, "Mon Étoile", was very successful, topping French charts, while their debut album, Notre Étoile, was moderately successful. However, their second single release, "Une seconde d'éternité", was much less successful despite good sales.

The band then collaborated with the British boy band Blue, making a bilingual English/French version of the latter's song "Bubblin'". This new version was entitled "You & Me Bubblin". Soon afterwards, Linkup disbanded due to poor performance of sales on releases.

== Solo career ==
=== Matt Pokora / M. Pokora (2004/2005) ===
In 2004, soon after the break-up of Linkup, Tota started preparing for his solo career, collaborating with the producers Kore & Skalp.

Under the stage name Matt Pokora, he released his first eponymous solo album originally entitled Matt Pokora. In 2005, he was forced to change his chosen name after a lawsuit from French R&B singer Matt Houston. As a result, he changed his stage name to M. Pokora and re-released the album as M. Pokora.

The debut single from M. Pokora, called "Showbiz (The Battle)", was a Top 10 hit in France, and also charted in Belgium and Switzerland. The second single, Elle me contrôle, featuring Sweety, reached no. 6 in France, and Pokora received two NRJ Music Awards for the single. Yet a third successful single was released called "Pas sans toi". The album, released with Universal, was certified gold.

He also started collaborating with Hakim Ghorab, who became his long-time choreographer and took part in many of his music videos. He also developed a close collaboration with music video director Karim Ouaret, who directed most of his successful videos.

=== Player (2006/2007) ===
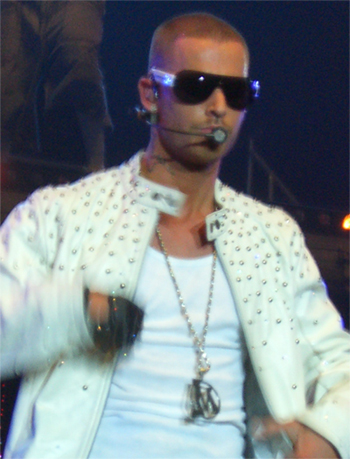
M. Pokora performing in 2007

In January 2006, his second album, Player, was released, topping the French chart. For its production, he collaborated with Belgian producers Bionix, Rachid Mir and Christian Dessart and artists Red Rat and Zoxea, and geared it toward the younger and feminine fan brackets. He also enjoyed great popularity with gay audiences. The first single from his second album was the successful "De retour" featuring Tyron Carter, followed by the single "Oh la la la (Sexy Miss)" with Red Rat.

During a concert organized by NRJ Radio in France, he met Puerto Rican singer Ricky Martin, who asked him to collaborate on Martin's hit "It's Alright". The result was a bilingual French/English release also entitled "It's Alright" that sold more than 100,000 copies. Finally, a last single from the Player album followed, called "Mal de guerre", which was a relative success. M. Pokora released Player in a second edition in March 2006 with the duet with Martin added as a bonus track.

To promote the album and capitalize on its success, M. Pokora engaged in a tour of more than 30 French venues, entitled Player Tour, which culminated in a big sold-out concert at Palais Omnisports de Paris-Bercy. At the end of the tour, a DVD containing materials from the shows was marketed under the name Player Tour Live. The DVD also included a photo book and memories from the tour.

Pokora also created his own label, M2theP Entertainment, signing his protégé, the rapper Tyron Carter. In addition to being featured on "De retour", Carter released "Ne me dis pas", featuring M. Pokora, a Top 30 hit, followed by an album, Mon hold-up.

=== MP3 (2008/2009) ===
After end of the Player Tour, Pokora left Universal and signed with EMI France. Also desiring a more international profile, he went to New York and created contacts most importantly with producers Ryan Leslie and J. R. Rotem. The result was his third album MP3, which was released on 24 March 2008, containing 14 tracks, including 12 in English. The title of the album was a play on his name Matt Pokora (MP) and the number 3 (his third album), but also referring to the popular MP3 audio format for consumer audio storage. M. Pokora promoted the launch of the album with a prerelease of the single "Dangerous" featuring American hip hop artist Timbaland and Sebastian, Timbaland's brother. The timing of the release was picked to coincide with the NRJ Music Awards of 2008.

The album reached no. 7 in France, with estimated physical sales of 200,000 copies and additional downloads of 151,000, and was certified gold. The album also did well internationally, charting in Finland, Germany, Mexico, Belgium, and Poland, where he won the Polish Eska Music Awards as the "International hip hop Artist of the Year".

After the success of "Dangerous", Pokora released a second single, "They Talk Sh#t About Me", featuring the English rapper Natalia Kills, credited on the release by her stage name, Verse. Unlike "Dangerous" (which had reached no. 1), this single was not played heavily on French radio because of its English lyrics and managed to reach only no. 24. A third release from MP3, "Catch Me If You Can", was made with the music video featuring Julie Ricci. She is known for her appearances on Top Model in 2007 on M6 and in Secret Story in its 4th season on TF1. The single failed to make it to the French charts, but was successful in Poland, reaching no. 11. The follow-up, "Through The Eyes", was also a relative success in Poland, reaching no. 31 in the country's charts.

To coincide with MP3's release, M. Pokora launched his Catch Me Tour 2008, ending with a concert in Palais Omnisports de Paris-Bercy on 18 November 2008. He also toured Belgium (6 December), Switzerland (13 December), ending with a final concert in Lyon, France, on 14 December 2008.

=== Mise À Jour / Updated (2010/2011) ===
M. Pokora's fourth studio album, titled Mise à jour, was released on 23 August 2010. The lead single, "Juste une photo de toi", was released on 7 June 2010 and reached no. 4 in the French Albums Chart. It includes collaborations with Wayne Beckford, Gee Futuristic, X-Plosive, Astro Boyz, Tarz, STX and Bionix. Simultaneously, a Mis à jour Édition Deluxe was released that, in addition to the original 15 tracks of Mis à jour, also contained seven new tracks exclusive for the Deluxe edition (including six in English).

The first single from the album was "Juste une photo de toi", released concurrently with the launch of the album. On 22 January 2011, during the NRJ Music Awards, the song was chosen as "Song of the Year" in addition to M. Pokora winning "French Male Artist of the Year".

To consolidate his international drive started with the MP3 album, he announced that an English version was under preparation. Finally, the English version, titled Updated, was launched on 14 March 2011, containing 11 songs, mostly adaptations of the French-language hits on Mise à jour. Six of the titles were already known by the French public through the August 2010 Mise à jour Édition Deluxe release.

For the promotion of the album, he organized a mini-tour and a series of open-air concerts, rather than concerts in halls.

In November 2010, a follow-up single, "Mirage", was released, accompanied by a new music video. The single received many downloads, but not enough physical sales to reach the top of the charts, and the single made it only up to no. 64 despite the top position in downloads.

In January 2011, "Oblivion", an English-language version of "Mirage", was released with the same arrangement but with new English lyrics for the international markets. The single was an opener for the release of Updated, destined for non-French markets of Mis à jour songs, but was made available for French markets as well.

In March 2011, M. Pokora announced a tour of 15 French cities, venues in Belgium and a final show in the Olympia. As a prelude, he also appeared in French, Belgian and Swiss clubs with dates from April to June 2011.

In March 2011, he also launched Mise à jour Version 2.0, which included extra materials including the Jean-Jacques Goldman, Carole Fredericks and Michael Jones classic "À nos actes manqués", which was destined to be his new single. It immediately became the number one physical single sales and reached the Top 10. The album Mise à jour Version 2.0 was made available on 18 April 2011, containing 17 titles, including 14 form the original, the Jean-Jacques Goldman cover single, three English-language titles from Updated, and a new French track, "Si on échangeait les rôles", the French version of Updated's "Finally Found Ya".

=== À la poursuite du bonheur (2012/2013) ===
M. Pokora's fifth studio album, À la poursuite du bonheur, was released on 20 March. The album's leading single, "Juste un instant", was released on 30 January 2012 and reached number eighteen on the French singles chart. The album entered the French albums chart at number two. The second single from the album was "On est là", released in April 2012. In order to promote the album, M. Pokora embarked in a national tour in May 2012. The third single from the album was announced in the end of May; "Merci d'être" was officially released on 2 July 2012. The album was re-issued on 19 November 2012; the new edition includes five new tracks, including the Jean-Jacques Goldman cover "Envole-moi" with singer Tal.

=== R.E.D. (2015/2016) ===
M. Pokora's sixth studio album, R.E.D. / Rythmes Extrêmement Dangereux, was released in France in February 2015.

=== My Way (2016) ===
M. Pokora's seventh studio album, My Way, was released in France on 21 October 2016, topping the French Albums Chart in its initial week of release.

=== Pyramide (2019) ===
M. Pokora's eighth studio album, Pyramide, was released in France on 12 April 2019. The album reached the top of the French Chart upon its release.

=== Epicentre (2022) ===
M. Pokora's ninth studio album, Epicentre, was released in France on 4 November 2022.

== Acting career ==
In 2011, Pokora voiced Duncan Rosenblatt, the main character of Firebreather, in the French dub of the Cartoon Network movie.

=== Robin des Bois (2013) ===
M. Pokora appeared in the lead role of Robin Hood in the French musical Robin des Bois (full title Robin des Bois: Ne renoncez jamais). It premiered on September 26, 2013 in Palais des congrès de Paris, with performances in that venue extending up to November 10, 2013 before touring all over France. The musical, a Gilbert Coullier, Roberto Ciurleo and RDB-P presentation, with musical mise en scène by Michel Laprise and text and music by Patrice Guirao and Lionel Florence, was tipped as the musical event of 2013 in France.

The soundtrack for the musical was released on Capitol Records / EMI on 22 March 2013 and entered the SNEP official French Albums Chart in its first week of release. It later peaked at number 3.

Two tracks from the album that were performed by M. Pokora have been released as singles. The first was "Le jour qui se rêve", a solo performance by Pokora, and "À nous", performed by M. Pokora (Robin des Bois), Nyco Lilliu as Frère Tuck (Friar Tuck) and Marc Antoine as Petit Jean (Little John).

== Personal life ==
M. Pokora was troubled by the divorce of his parents and remained attached to his mother after the divorce. He lived with her in Strasbourg before renting an apartment in Paris. His autobiographical song "Sur ma route", co-written by Jack Robinson, M. Pokora and Jordan Houyez and which appears on his album MP3, recounts his experiences as a child in a broken home. He keeps contact with his father, who actively supports him.

As a football fan, Pokora dreamed of a professional football career very early on. He is a supporter of the French football club Olympique de Marseille, and takes part in many football events.

M. Pokora has been friends for many years with his personal choreographer Hakim Ghorab and his wife Aline and is godfather to their daughter Lola. He is also a friend of footballer Djibril Cissé and is godfather to one of his sons. He added a tattoo reading X as a tribute to him, because Cissé makes the X sign with his hands every time he scores. Cissé carries a similar X tattoo himself.

On 29 June 2014, during the last performance of Robin Hood show, he formalized his love story with dancer Scarlett Baya.

Pokora has been in a relationship with Christina Milian since August 2017. In January 2020, Milian gave birth to their son. In December 2020, a French magazine reported they were married, and that they were expecting a second child. In April 2021, they welcomed their second son.

== Charities and public awareness ==
From the start, and over many years, M. Pokora has supported charity causes particularly HIV/AIDS and children charities. In 2004, he took part in the charity single "Chanter qu'on les aime", in support of Association Mondiale des Amis de l'Enfance (AMADE). In 2005, he was in "Protège-toi", an AIDS charity single for Collectif Protection Rapprochée. In the same year, he was in "Et puis la terre...", a charity single for the tsunami victims under the name Artistes Solidaritie Ici pour Eux (A.S.I.E.) with a great number of French artists.

In 2006, he sang in "L'Or de nos vies", a charity single from Fight Aids. In 2007, he took part in two renditions: "Je fais de toi mon essentiel" by Emmanuel Moire and "S'aimer est interdit" by Anne-Laure Girbal, both featured on the charity album "Le Roi Soleil – De Monaco à Versailles (LIVE) – Fight Aids".

In 2010, Pokora appeared in Collectif Kilomaitre charity single "Un Respect mutuel", with many other hip hop and urban artists. He was associated with AIDES project and in 2010 sang a solo cover of Tracy Chapman's "Talking About a Revolution", on the charity album Message (AIDES)"

Pokora has been a member of the Les Enfoirés charity ensemble since 2012.

Tattoos

M Pokora is very famous for his body tattoos including:

- "POKORA" meaning humility in Polish (also the artist's adopted artistic name) inscribed on his right arm in capital letters
- "Only God Can Judge Me" on the right arm in English
- Chinese calligraphy signifying "Creativity", "Peace" and "Patience" surrounded by a dragon on his left shoulder
- The letter M signifying his name (Matthieu) surrounded by colorful flames on his left arm
- A tattoo on the calf symbolizing dancing
- An Arabic saying on his neck: قل الخير والا فاصمت, roughly 'Say good things or keep silent']
- "Ambition" on his lower back in Chinese calligraphy surrounded by chains and two wings.
- Letter X on his right wrist signifying brotherhood/friendship, as a tribute to his close friend Djibril Cissé, a footballer who makes the X sign with his arms every time he scores in a soccer game.
- A star between his left thumb and forefinger
- Star-flower near his left ear

== In popular culture ==
- M. Pokora took part three times in French television game and adventure competition series Fort Boyard in 2005, 2006 and 2009 winning with his team 3690, 28230 and 3000 euros respectively, all donated to charities.
- In 2006, he performed "Elle me contrôle" in the TV show La chanson de l'année alongside other notable artists
- In 2006, his song "Get Down On It" appeared on the soundtrack of Asterix and the Vikings
- In 2006, he took part in the French version of Muppets TV (broadcast on 31 December 2006)
- In 2007, he took part in Symphonic show special organized by Sidaction, a French AIDS charity
- In 2008, Sony Ericsson and EMI Music France his label offered in exclusivity the downloading of 7 songs from the MP3 album through the W380i as a promotional and sponsoring campaign.
- In April 2008, M. Pokora also gave an interview to French gay publication Têtu also appearing on its cover.
- He took part in "L'Or de nos vies", a charity song recorded for "Fight AIDS Monaco", an association of Princess Stéphanie of Monaco
- He also took part with a song in the album Message made available starting January 2010 with contribution from many artists including Christophe Willem, Jennifer, Anggun, Sliimy, Natasha St Pier, Daniel Powter, Lara Fabian. M. Pokora's contribution included "Talking About a Revolution", a cover of a Tracy Chapman hit.
- In 2011, he performed on Le show Johnny hosted by Johnny Hallyday
- Enjoying great popularity with children, M. Pokora has taken part in many broadcasts concentrated on kids, including a special on him on 25 May 2011 on L'École des fans presented by Philippe Risoli where children Gabin, Alicia, Romane, Yamin, Axel and Inès aged 5 to 7 years sang covers of his songs. He also interpreted his cover hit "À nos actes manqués" on the show. He was also co-sponsor with Hélène Ségara et Jean-Luc Reichmann of the second edition of TF1's show Le grand show des enfants broadcast on 30 April 2011.

Winning Danse avec les stars

- On 19 March 2011 he won season 1 inaugural series of Danse avec les stars (the French version of Dancing with the Stars) with his partner Katrina Patchett getting 62% of the votes against 38% to runner-up Sofia Essaïdi.

== Discography ==
=== Albums ===
As part of Linkup

- 2003: Notre étoile
  (as a member of Linkup)

Solo

- 2004: M. Pokora
- 2006: Player
- 2008: MP3
- 2010 / 2011: Mise à jour /
  Updated / Mise à jour Version 2.0
- 2012: À la poursuite du bonheur
- 2013: À la poursuite du bonheur Tour – Live à Bercy
- 2015: R.E.D.
- 2016: My Way
- 2019: Pyramide
- 2022: Epicentre

Special releases

- 2013: À la poursuite du bonheur / Mise à jour (re-release)

=== DVDs ===
- 2005 "Un an avec M. Pokora" (One year with M. Pokora)
- 2006 "Player Tour"
- 2007 "100% VIP" (with Alexandra Gas)
- 2012 "A La Poursuite Du Bonheur Tour"
- 2015 "M.Pokora 10 ans de Carrière Symphonic Show "

== Filmography ==
Year	Title	Role	Director	Notes
2013	Nos chers voisins	Antoine		TV series (1 episode)
2013	Scènes de ménages	Mattéo	Francis Duquet	TV series (1 episode)

== Tours ==
- 2006/2007 Player Tour
- 2008/2009 Catch Me Tour
- 2010/2011 Mise a jour Tour
- 2012 À la poursuite du bonheur – Tour 2012
- 2015 R.E.D Tour
- 2017 My way Tour
- 2019/2020 Pyramide Tour

== Books ==
- 2006: M. Pokora – La révolution R&B
- 2006: Et je me souviens, Editions K&B
- 2008: M. Pokora vu par, Éditions Broché
- 2013: "De Mathhieu à Robin des Bois", Editions Dider Carpentier, by Cédric NAIMI
- 2014: "M.Pokora, La véritable histoire", by Jérémy Lapage
