= France in the Eurovision Song Contest 2006 =

- Eurovision Song Contest 2006
- Participating broadcaster: France Télévisions
- Country: France
- Selection process: Artist: Et si c'était vous? Song: Internal selection
- Selection date: Artist: 14 March 2006; Song: 10 April 2006

Competing entry
- Song: "Il était temps"
- Artist: Virginie Pouchain
- Songwriters: Corneille Nyungura

Placement
- Final result: 22nd, 5 points

Participation chronology

France was represented at the Eurovision Song Contest 2006 with the song "Il était temps", written by Corneille Nyungura, and performed by Virginie Pouchain. The French participating broadcaster, France Télévisions, selected its performer for the contest through the competition Et si c'était vous? and, subsequently, the song internally once the national final was over.

Singers interested in entering the French national final had the opportunity to apply to one of three open competitions with defined periods organised by France 2, France 3, and RFO. A total of 21 artists were selected; thirteen were selected from the France 3 selection and four were each selected from the France 2 and RFO selections. The 21 finalists competed in the national final on 14 March 2006 where the winner was selected over three rounds of voting. In the first round, the top ten candidates were selected by a four-member jury panel to advance to the second round. In the second round, the top three candidates were selected to advance to the final round following the combination of votes from the jury panel and a public vote, during which "Vous, c'est nous" performed by Virginie Pouchain was selected as the winner following the combination of votes from the jury and public vote. On 17 March 2006, France Télévisions announced that Pouchain would perform a new song at the Eurovision Song Contest and "Il était temps" was presented to the public as the new entry during a live performance by Pouchain on 10 April 2006 during the France 3 programme Questions pour un champion.

As a member of the "Big Four", France automatically qualified to compete in the final of the Eurovision Song Contest. Performing in position 19, France placed twenty-second out of the 24 participating countries with 5 points.

== Background ==
Prior to the 2006 Contest, France Télévisions and its predecessor national broadcasters, have participated in the Eurovision Song Contest representing France forty-eight times since RTF's debut in 1956. They first won the contest in 1958 with "Dors, mon amour" performed by André Claveau. In the 1960s, they won three times, with "Tom Pillibi" performed by Jacqueline Boyer in 1960, "Un premier amour" performed by Isabelle Aubret in 1962, and "Un jour, un enfant" performed by Frida Boccara, who won in 1969 in a four-way tie with the Netherlands, Spain, and the United Kingdom. Their fifth – and so far latest – victory came in 1977 with "L'oiseau et l'enfant" performed by Marie Myriam. France has also finished second four times, with Paule Desjardins in 1957, Catherine Ferry in 1976, Joëlle Ursull in 1990, and Amina in 1991 (who lost out to Sweden's Carola in a tie-break). In the 21st century, it has making the top ten two times, with "Je n'ai que mon âme" performed by Natasha St-Pier finishing fourth in 2001 and "Il faut du temps" by Sandrine François finishing fifth in 2002. In 2005, "Chacun pense à soi" performed by Ortal finished in twenty-third place.

As part of its duties as participating broadcaster, France Télévisions organises the selection of its entry in the Eurovision Song Contest and broadcasts the event in the country through France 3. The broadcaster confirmed that it would participate in the 2006 contest on 11 December 2005. The French broadcasters had used both national finals and internal selection to choose their entries in the past. From 2001 to 2004, France Télévisions opted to internally select its entries. In 2005 the broadcaster selected its entry via a national final, a procedure that was continued in order to select the 2006 entry.

== Before Eurovision ==
=== Et si c'était vous? ===
Et si c'était vous? was the national selection organised by France Télévisions through its channels: France 2, France 3, and the overseas territories broadcaster RFO in order to select its entry for the Eurovision Song Contest 2006. The final took place on 14 March 2006 at the La Plaine St-Denis television studios in Paris, hosted by Michel Drucker and Claudy Siar. The show was broadcast on France 3 as well as online via the broadcaster channel's official website france3.fr. The national final was watched by 3.4 million viewers in France with a market share of 18.5%.

==== Format ====
The selection process took place in two stages before the 21 selected finalists for the live final and ultimately the winner were selected. The first stage of the competition included France 2, France 3, and RFO each conducting varying selections in order to determine the candidates they submitted for the second stage of the competition. France 3 submitted thirteen candidates while France 2 and RFO each submitted four candidates. The 21 candidates proceeded to the second stage, the televised national final, where the winning artist was selected as the French entrant for the Eurovision Song Contest 2006 and would perform an internally selected song written by Canadian singer-songwriter Corneille Nyungura.

==== France 2 selection ====
The four candidates selected by France 2 for the national final were determined through the France 2 programme Entrée des Artistes, produced and hosted by Pascal Sevran. Eighteen contestants were selected for the competition from over 500 performers that attended auditions held in Lille, Marseille, and Paris between 2 December 2005 and 13 December 2005. Following two heats on 14 and 21 January 2006 and a semi-final on 28 January 2006, six contestants ultimately qualified to compete in the final on 4 February 2006, from which four were selected exclusively by public televoting to advance to the national final and announced during an additional show on 4 March 2006.

R/O	Artist	Song (Original artists)	Place
1	Yorrick Vrzal	"Marguerite" (Richard Cocciante)	—
2	Laura	"Un enfant" (Jacques Brel)	—
3	Mickaël	"Une femme" (Roch Voisine)	—
4	Mélody Simek	"Paris violon" (Michel Legrand)	—
5	Fabien Incardona	"Cent mille chansons" (Frida Boccara)	—
6	Virginie Pouchain	"Le coeur volcan" (Julien Clerc)	1

==== France 3 selection ====
The thirteen candidates selected by France 3 for the national final were determined through auditions held in thirteen cities across France between 16 January 2006 and 3 February 2006, where over 3,000 performers attended. From each audition, ten performers were selected to advance to the second round and the public was able to vote online via france3.fr. The winner of each audition was determined by the combination of the online vote (50%) and a jury panel headed by vocal coach Malika Bellari (50%) and announced between 9 and 14 February 2006.

Audition site	Audition date	Selected candidate
Île-de-France	16 January 2006	Candice Parise
Nord-Pas-de-Calais	17 January 2006	Aude Henneville
Lorraine Champagne-Ardenne	19 January 2006	Alexandre Vautrin
Alsace	20 January 2006	Virginie Schaeffer
Auvergne-Rhône-Alpes	22 January 2006	Gwladys Fraioli
Bourgogne-Franche-Comté	23 January 2006	Tamara Calhoun
Marseille	26 January 2006	Pierre Suppa
Corsica	27 January 2006	Laurent Leandri
Rennes	29 January 2006	Maëlle Audic
Normandy	30 January 2006	Émilie Chenneviere
Aquitaine	1 February 2006	Leila Barechdy
Bordeaux	2 February 2006	Fabian Ballarin
Limousin Poitou-Charentes	3 February 2006	Julien Lamassonne

==== RFO selection ====
The four candidates selected by RFO for the national final were determined through the musical programme 9 Semaines et 1 Jour which featured 93 artists from French overseas territories. Nine artists ultimately qualified to compete in the final round, from which four were selected to advance to the national final by the combination of an online vote (1/3) and a jury panel (2/3) and announced on 7 February 2006. For the online vote, the public was able to vote for their favourite artists via the programme website 9s1j.rfo.fr between 30 January and 5 February 2006.

R/O	Territory	Artist	Result
1	Martinique	Kolo Barst	Advanced
2	Réunion	Ousa Nousava	—N/a
3	Mayotte	Mikidache	Advanced
4	French Polynesia	Barthélémy	—N/a
5	Guadeloupe	Krys	—N/a
6	Saint Pierre and Miquelon	D'Ge	—N/a
7	New Caledonia	Gulaan	—N/a
8	New Caledonia	Tyssia	Advanced
9	French Guiana	Chris Combette	Advanced

==== National final ====
The national final took place on 14 March 2006 and the winner was selected over three rounds of voting. In the first round, the twenty-one finalists performed cover versions of popular songs in groups and the top ten contestants as determined by a five-member jury panel advanced to the second round. In the second round, each of the remaining ten contestants performed a cover version of a French language song and together performed a medley of former Eurovision songs: "Poupée de cire, poupée de son" by France Gall (Luxembourg 1965), "L'Oiseau et l'Enfant" by Marie Myriam (France 1977), "Ne partez pas sans moi" by Céline Dion (Switzerland 1988) and "White and Black Blues" by Joëlle Ursull (France 1990), as well as a medley of English language songs: "Y.M.C.A." by Village People, "Rasputin" by Boney M., "Ring My Bell" by Anita Ward and "Lady Marmalade" by Patti LaBelle. The top three contestants as determined by the combination of public televoting (50%) and the five-member jury (50%) advanced to the final round, during which each of the remaining three contestants performed a cover version of a French language song and the winner, Virginie Pouchain, was determined by the public and jury vote.

The jury panel consisted of:

- Charles Aznavour – Singer-songwriter
- Lara Fabian – Canadian singer-songwriter, represented Luxembourg in 1988
- Natasha St-Pier – Canadian singer, represented France in 2001
- Pierre Gage – Singer
- René-Frantz Durosel – Manager of Corneille Nyungura

In addition to the performances of the contestants, Corneille Nyungura and jury members Lara Fabian and Natasha St-Pier performed as the interval acts of the show. The French contest entry, "Vous, c'est nous", was also presented to the public during the show.

First Round – 14 March 2006
R/O	Artist	Result
1	Candice Parise	Advanced
2	Aude Henneville	Advanced
3	Alexandre Vautrin	Advanced
4	Virginie Schaeffer	Advanced
5	Gwladys Fraioli	—N/a
6	Tamara Calhoun	—N/a
7	Pierre Suppa	Advanced
8	Laurent Leandri	—N/a
9	Maëlle Audic	—N/a
10	Émilie Chenneviere	—N/a
11	Leila Barechdy	Advanced
12	Fabian Ballarin	—N/a
13	Julien Lamassonne	Advanced
14	Kolo Barst	—N/a
15	Chris Combette	—N/a
16	Mikidache	—N/a
17	Tyssia	Advanced
18	Mélody Simek	—N/a
19	Yorrick Vrzal	—N/a
20	Fabien Incardona	Advanced
21	Virginie Pouchain	Advanced

Second Round – 14 March 2006
R/O	Artist	Song (Original artists)	Result
1	Virginie Schaeffer	"Mourir demain" (Natasha St-Pier and Pascal Obispo)	—N/a
2	Alexandre Vautrin	"La vie ne m'apprend rien" (Daniel Balavoine)	—N/a
3	Virginie Pouchain	"J'te l'dis quand même" (Patrick Bruel)	Advanced
4	Aude Henneville	"Il suffira d'un signe" (Jean-Jacques Goldman)	—N/a
5	Tyssia	"Je serai là" (Teri Moïse)	—N/a
6	Pierre Suppa	"Les Histoires d'a" (Les Rita Mitsouko)	—N/a
7	Candice Parise	"D'aventures en aventures" (Serge Lama)	—N/a
8	Fabien Incardona	"Chanter" (Florent Pagny)	Advanced
9	Julien Lamassone	"Sur la route" (Gérald De Palmas)	Advanced
10	Leila Barechdy	"Chanter pour ceux qui sont loin de chez eux" (Michel Berger)	—N/a

Final Round – 14 March 2006
R/O	Artist	Song (Original artists)	Percentage	Place
1	Virginie Pouchain	"Pour que tu m'aimes encore" (Celine Dion)	42.5%	1
2	Fabien Incardona	"Savoir aimer" (Florent Pagny)	34.2%	2
3	Julien Lamassone	"L'Envie" (Johnny Hallyday)	23.3%	3

=== Song selection ===
Following Virginie Pouchain's win at the French national final, the singer stated that she would be performing a song other than "Vous, c'est nous" at the Eurovision Song Contest following consultation with composer Corneille Nyungura as the entry, originally written to be performed by a male vocalist, did not suit her style. After being given an extended deadline by the EBU, the replacement entry "Il était temps" was formally presented to the public on 10 April 2006 during the France 3 programme Questions pour un champion, hosted by Julien Lepers.

== At Eurovision ==
According to Eurovision rules, all nations with the exceptions of the host country, the "Big Four" (France, Germany, Spain, and the United Kingdom) and the ten highest placed finishers in the 2005 contest are required to qualify from the semi-final in order to compete for the final; the top ten countries from the semi-final progress to the final. As a member of the "Big 4", France automatically qualified to compete in the final on 20 May 2006. In addition to their participation in the final, France is also required to broadcast and vote in the semi-final on 18 May 2006. During the running order draw for the semi-final and final on 21 March 2006, France was placed to perform in position 19 in the final, following the entry from Ukraine and before the entry from Croatia. Virginie Pouchain performed the song on stage together with cellist Matheson Bayley and France placed twenty-second in the final, scoring 5 points.

In France, the semi-final was broadcast on France 4 with commentary by Peggy Olmi and Éric Jean-Jean, while the final was broadcast on France 3 with commentary by Michel Drucker and Claudy Siar, as well as via radio on France Bleu with commentary by Alexandre Devoise. France Télévisions appointed Sophie Jovillard as its spokesperson to announce the French votes during the final.

=== Voting ===
Below is a breakdown of points awarded to France and awarded by France in the semi-final and grand final of the contest. The nation awarded its 12 points to Armenia in the semi-final and to Turkey in the final of the contest.

==== Points awarded to France ====
Points awarded to France (Final)
Score	Country
12 points	
10 points	
8 points	
7 points	
6 points	
5 points	
4 points	
3 points	Monaco
2 points	Armenia
1 point	

==== Points awarded by France ====
Points awarded by France (Semi-final)
Score	Country
12 points	Armenia
10 points	Turkey
8 points	Monaco
7 points	Portugal
6 points	Bosnia and Herzegovina
5 points	Finland
4 points	Bulgaria
3 points	Belgium
2 points	Poland
1 point	Iceland

Points awarded by France (Final)
Score	Country
12 points	Turkey
10 points	Armenia
8 points	Finland
7 points	Romania
6 points	Bosnia and Herzegovina
5 points	Greece
4 points	Israel
3 points	Sweden
2 points	Russia
1 point	Ireland
