= France in the Eurovision Song Contest 2007 =

- Eurovision Song Contest 2007
- Participating broadcaster: France Télévisions
- Country: France
- Selection process: Eurovision 2007 : et si on gagnait ?
- Selection date: 6 March 2007

Competing entry
- Song: "L'amour à la française"
- Artist: Les Fatals Picards
- Songwriters: Ivan Callot; Paul Léger; Laurent Honel

Placement
- Final result: 22nd, 19 points

Participation chronology

France was represented at the Eurovision Song Contest 2007 with the song "L'amour à la française", written by Ivan Callot, Paul Léger, and Laurent Honel, and performed by the band Les Fatals Picards. The French participating broadcaster, France Télévisions, organised the national final Eurovision 2007 : et si on gagnait ? in order to select its entry for the contest. Ten songs competed in the national final on 6 March 2007 where the winner was selected over two rounds of voting. In the first round, two entries were selected to advance to the second round following the combination of votes from a nine-member jury panel and a public vote. In the second round, "L'amour à la française" performed by les Fatals Picards was selected as the winner following the combination of votes from the jury and public vote.

As a member of the "Big Four", France automatically qualified to compete in the final of the Eurovision Song Contest. Performing in position 13, France placed twenty-second out of the 24 participating countries with 19 points.

== Background ==
Prior to the 2007 contest, France Télévisions and its predecessor national broadcasters, have participated in the Eurovision Song Contest representing France forty-nine times since RTF's debut in 1956. They first won the contest in 1958 with "Dors, mon amour" performed by André Claveau. In the 1960s, they won three times, with "Tom Pillibi" performed by Jacqueline Boyer in 1960, "Un premier amour" performed by Isabelle Aubret in 1962, and "Un jour, un enfant" performed by Frida Boccara, who won in 1969 in a four-way tie with the Netherlands, Spain, and the United Kingdom. Their fifth – and so far latest – victory came in 1977 with "L'oiseau et l'enfant" performed by Marie Myriam. They has also finished second four times, with Paule Desjardins in 1957, Catherine Ferry in 1976, Joëlle Ursull in 1990, and Amina in 1991 (who lost out to Sweden's Carola in a tie-break). In the 21st century, France has had less success, only making the top ten two times, with "Je n'ai que mon âme" performed by Natasha St-Pier finishing fourth in 2001 and "Il faut du temps" by Sandrine François finishing fifth in 2002. In 2006, "Il était temps" performed by Virginie Pouchain finished in twenty-second place.

As part of its duties as participating broadcaster, France Télévisions organises the selection of its entry in the Eurovision Song Contest and broadcasts the event in the country through France 3. The broadcaster confirmed that it would participate in the 2007 contest on 16 May 2006. The French broadcasters had used both national finals and internal selection to choose their entries in the past. From 2001 to 2004, France Télévisions opted to internally select its entries. The broadcaster selected its 2005 and 2006 entries via a national final, a procedure that it continued in order to select the 2007 entry.

== Before Eurovision ==
=== Eurovision 2007 : et si on gagnait ? ===
Eurovision 2007 : et si on gagnait ? was the national final organised by France Télévisions through its channels: France 2, France 3, France 4, France 5, and overseas territories broadcaster RFO, to select their entry for the Eurovision Song Contest 2007. The competition took place on 6 March 2007 at the La Plaine St-Denis studios in Paris, hosted by Julien Lepers and Tex. The show was broadcast on France 3 as well as online via the broadcaster channel's official website france3.fr. The national final was watched by 2.02 million viewers in France with a market share of 8.7%.

==== Competing entries ====
France Télévisions received 1,500 submissions after the broadcaster requested proposals from successful French acts over the last five years. The television channels of the French broadcaster France 2, France 3, France 4, France 5, and RFO reviewed the received submissions and each selected two entries to compete in the national final based on individual criteria: variety for France 2, newcomers for France 3, rap and rock music for France 4, pop music for France 5 and world music for RFO. One of the competing artists from the RFO selection, Valérie Louri, was selected via the musical programme 9 Semaines et 1 Jour. The competing artists and songs were announced on 2 February 2007. On 7 February 2007, the artists presented their entries to the public during an introductory event held at the Le Réservoir in Paris.

Artist	Song	Songwriter(s)	Channel
Charlotte Becquin	"Je veux tout"	Marco Prince	France 5
Cheb Hamid, BZR and Medhi	"Galbi" (قلبي)	Cheb Hamid, BZR, Medhi	France 2
Estelle Lemée	"Comme un rêve"	Thierry Sforza, Julien Assayah	France 2
Jennifer Chevalier	"Mon étoile"	Simon Caby, Laura Marciano, Michel Godebama	France 5
Les Fatals Picards	"L'amour à la française"	Ivan Callot, Paul Léger, Laurent Honel	France 3
Les Vedettes	"Vive Papa"	Philippe Katerine	France 3
Les Wampas	"Faut voter pour nous"	Didier Wampas, Jean Michel Lejoux, Niko Wampas, Philippe Almosnino, Joseph Dahan	France 4
MAP	"Grain de sel"	Hacène Khelifa, Jeoffrey Arnone, Kaddour Hadadi, Saïd Zouggagh, Stanko Grujić	France 4
Medi-T	"On and On"	Medi Sadoun, Thierry Nollet, David Adet	RFO
Valérie Louri	"Besoin d'ailleurs"	Marco Prince	RFO

==== Final ====
The final took place on 6 March 2007. Ten entries competed and the winner was selected over two rounds of voting. In the first round, the top two entries as determined by the combination of public televoting (50%) and a nine-member jury panel (50%) advanced to the second round, the superfinal. In the superfinal, the winner, "L'amour à la française" performed by les Fatals Picards, was determined by the public and jury vote. The jury panel consisted of Cécile Revenu (advertising manager of Les Inrockuptibles), Stéphane Deschamps (music delegate of France Bleu), Olivier Cachin (writer, editor-in-chief of Radikal), Jean-Michel Denis (cultural journalist at Afrique magazine), Thierry Lecamp (presenter at Europe 1), Jean-Pierre Pasqualini (director of Platine magazine), Anne-Valérie Atlan (founder of Mazava Prod), Éric Jean-Jean (presenter and producer at RTL) and jury president Gilles Lhote (journalist at Télé 7 Jours). The winning song was performed using Franglais, a mixture of French and English, and according to the songwriters meant to combine French romance and punk for beginners.

In addition to the performances of the competing entries, Marie Myriam (who won Eurovision for France in 1977) performed her winning song "L'oiseau et l'enfant" as the interval act of the show.

Final – 6 March 2007
R/O	Artist	Song	Place
1	Les Vedettes	"Vive Papa"	6
2	MAP	"Grain de sel"	—N/a
3	Jennifer Chevalier	"Mon étoile"	3
4	Les Fatals Picards	"L'amour à la française"	1
5	Medi-T	"On and On"	2
6	BZR, Cheb Hamid and Medhi	"Galbi"	—N/a
7	Valérie Louri	"Besoin d'ailleurs"	5
8	Les Wampas	"Faut voter pour nous"	—N/a
9	Charlotte Becquin	"Je veux tout"	10
10	Estelle Lemée	"Comme un rêve"	4

Superfinal – 6 March 2007
R/O	Artist	Song	Percentage	Place
1	Les Fatals Picards	"L'amour à la française"	72%	1
2	Medi-T	"On and On"	28%	2

== At Eurovision ==
According to Eurovision rules, all nations with the exceptions of the host country, the "Big Four" (France, Germany, Spain and the United Kingdom) and the ten highest placed finishers in the 2006 contest are required to qualify from the semi-final in order to compete for the final; the top ten countries from the semi-final progress to the final. As a member of the "Big 4", France automatically qualified to compete in the final on 12 May 2007. In addition to their participation in the final, France is also required to broadcast and vote in the semi-final on 10 May 2007.

In France, the semi-final was broadcast on France 4 with commentary by Peggy Olmi and Yann Renoard, while the final was broadcast on France 3 with commentary by Julien Lepers and Tex, as well as via radio on France Bleu with commentary by Yves Derisbourg. France Télévisions appointed Vanessa Dolmen as its spokesperson to announce the French votes during the final.

=== Final ===
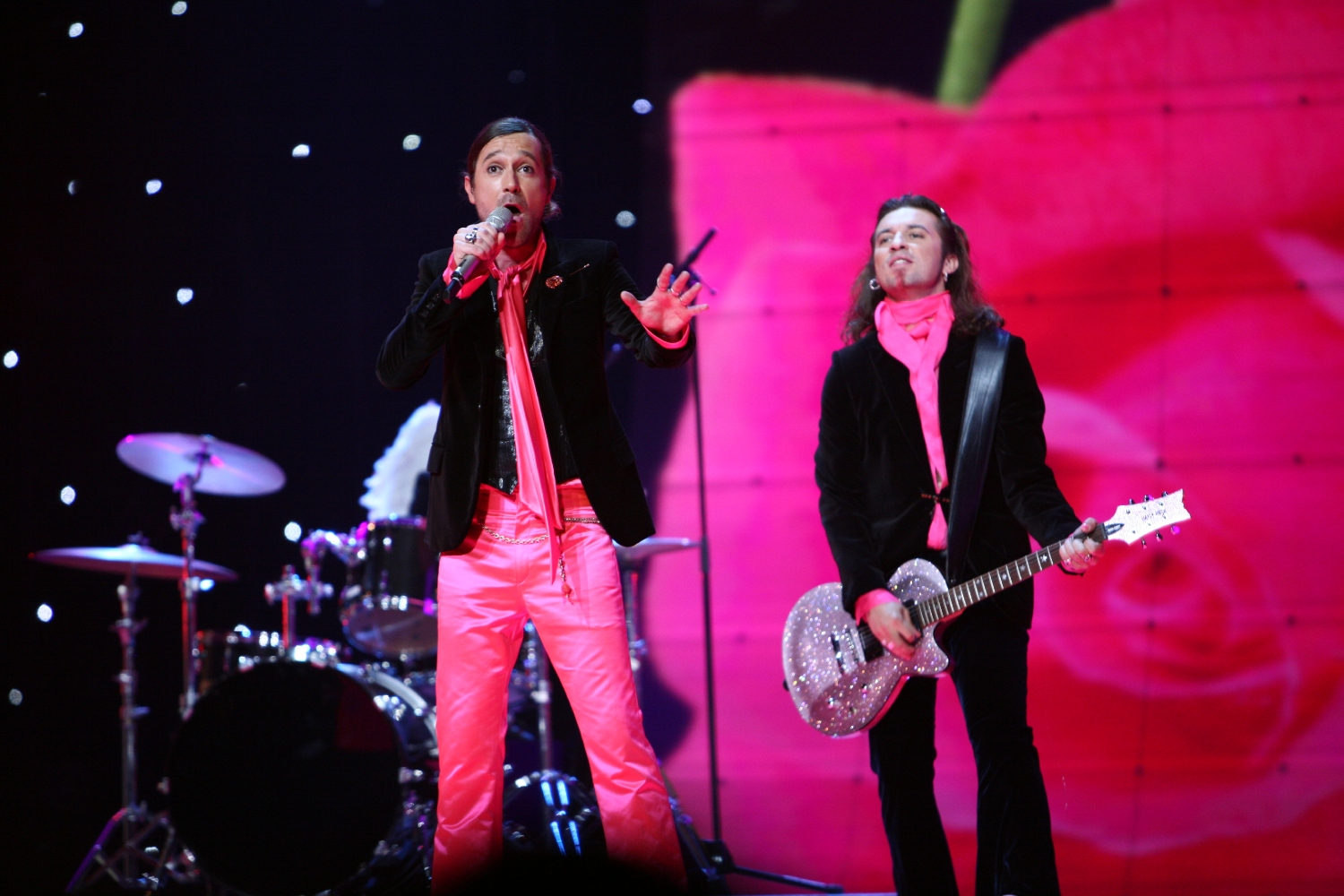
Les Fatals Picards during a rehearsal before the final

Les Fatals Picards took part in technical rehearsals on 7 and 8 May, followed by dress rehearsals on 11 and 12 May. During the running order draw for the semi-final and final on 12 March 2007, France was placed to perform in position 13 in the final, following the entry from Sweden and before the entry from Latvia.

The French performance featured the members of les Fatals Picards on stage in a band set-up dressed in retro black and pink outfits, including the addition of the white wings of Cupid on the band drummer Jean-Marc Sauvagnargues's back and a faux object on the shoulder of lead singer Ivan Callot. During the performance, the members of les Fatals Picards performed frantic actions, including running about the stage. The stage colours were predominately pink and the LED screens displayed a collage of candy pink and white roses with graphics of the Eiffel Tower and Notre Dame fading in and out over the roses. France placed twenty-second in the final, scoring 19 points.

=== Voting ===
Below is a breakdown of points awarded to France and awarded by France in the semi-final and grand final of the contest. The nation awarded its 12 points to Turkey in the semi-final and final of the contest.

==== Points awarded to France ====
Points awarded to France (Final)
Score	Country
12 points	
10 points	
8 points	Andorra
7 points	
6 points	
5 points	
4 points	Albania
3 points	Lithuania
2 points	Armenia; Estonia
1 point	

==== Points awarded by France ====
Points awarded by France (Semi-final)
Score	Country
12 points	Turkey
10 points	Portugal
8 points	Bulgaria
7 points	Serbia
6 points	Israel
5 points	Cyprus
4 points	Georgia
3 points	Poland
2 points	Hungary
1 point	Slovenia

Points awarded by France (Final)
Score	Country
12 points	Turkey
10 points	Armenia
8 points	Serbia
7 points	Romania
6 points	Spain
5 points	Bulgaria
4 points	Ukraine
3 points	Greece
2 points	Russia
1 point	Bosnia and Herzegovina
