= Cat's Eyes (TV series) =

Mystery television series

- Genre: Heist; Crime drama; Thriller; Mystery
- Created by: Michel Catz
- Based on: Cat's Eye by Tsukasa Hojo
- Directed by: Alexandre Laurent
- Starring: Camille Lou; Constance Labbé; Claire Romain; MB14; Élodie Fontan; Cindy Bruna; Simon Ehrlacher; Tamara Marthe; Tom Leeb; Arnaud Binard; Lola Dewaere; Jérôme Le Banner; Léon Plazol
- Theme music composer: Cyril de Turckheim; Alexandre Révérend
- Opening theme: "Signé Cat's Eyes" performed by Anne Sila
- Composer: François Lietout
- Country of origin: France
- Original language: French
- No. of seasons: 2
- No. of episodes: 16

Production
- Executive producer: Stéphane Amphoux
- Producers: Benjamin Dupont-Jubien; Mehdi Sabbar
- Production locations: Île-de-France, France
- Cinematography: Jean-Philippe Gosselin
- Editors: Jean de Garrigues; Nicolas Pechitch; Grégory Attia
- Camera setup: Single-camera
- Running time: 49-63 minutes
- Production companies: Big Band Story; TF1 Production (Note: In association with Amazon Prime Video (season 1), Disney+ (season 2), uFund (season 2), and Indéfilms 14 (season 2), and in collaboration with Coamix Inc.); Be-Films (season 2); Umedia (season 2)
- Budget: €25 million (season 1)

Original release
- Network: TF1 (France); Amazon Prime Video (international, season 1); Hulu (Note: Released on Disney+'s Hulu hub in France and outside of the United States) (international, season 2)
- Release: 11 November 2024 – present

Cat's Eyes is a French heist crime drama television series created by Michel Catz, and produced by Big Band Story for TF1, in association with Amazon Prime Video for the first season, and Disney+ for the second season. It is based on the 1981–85 manga series Cat's Eye by Tsukasa Hojo.

The series, set in Paris, follows the three Chamade sisters who are art thieves trying to collect all the works belonging to their missing father. It stars Camille Lou, Constance Labbé, and Claire Romain as the sisters alongside an ensemble cast.

The series development was announced in April 2023 by the TF1 Group with Benjamin Dupont-Jubien and Mehdi Sabbar serving as producers. Casting began in June 2023 with Lou, Labbé, and Romain announced to play their respective roles. Filming took place in Île-de-France, mainly in Paris, and began in October 2023. On a budget of €25 million for its first season, it is currently the network most expensive television series, and the second most expensive French television series ever made.

Prior to its debut in France, Cat's Eyes first premiered in French speaking regions of Belgium and Switzerland on 6 November 2024 on RTL-TVI, and on 8 November on RTS 1. It premiered in France on 11 November on TF1. Internationally, the series premiered on 18 December on Amazon Prime Video in select regions, before moving to Hulu and Disney+'s Hulu hub in 2026.

In February 2025, the series was renewed for a second season, which premiered in France on 12 October 2026 on TF1 and Disney+'s Hulu hub simultaneously, while the full season was released on 19 October on the service.

== Premise ==
Cat's Eyes is set in Paris where Tamara Chamade, along with her older sister Sylia and her younger sister Alexia, lead a double life as a trio of art thieves, stealing works of art which primarily belonged to their long-missing father, Michaël Heinz, who was a famous art collector who died during a mysterious fire in his art gallery, while trying to discover the real reasons behind his disappearance. They often have to escape a special unit of the BRB, led by Quentin Chapuis, Tamara's ex-boyfriend, who is investigating the Cat's Eye case.

== Cast and characters ==
=== Starring ===
- Camille Lou as Tamara "Tam" Chamade, the leader of the Cat's Eyes.
- Constance Labbé as Sylia "Syl" Chamade, Tam and Alexia's older sister.
- Claire Romain as Alexia "Alex" Chamade, Syl and Tam's younger sister.
- MB14 as Quentin Chapuis, the captain of the BROCS, a unit of the BRB, and Tam's ex boyfriend.
- Élodie Fontan as Prudence Dalembert, a hitwoman working for her brother Christian.
- Cindy Bruna (season 1) and Tamara Marthe (season 2) as Gwen Assaya, a police officer and Quentin's girlfriend.
- Simon Ehrlacher as Abel Azoury, Syl's boyfriend.
- Tom Leeb as Lucas Svejic / Le Marquis (season 2), a rival thief.
- Grégory Fitoussi (co-starring season 1) and Arnaud Binard (season 2) as Michaël Heinz, the Chamade sisters's father who disappeared during a fire.
- Lola Dewaere as Barbara Altman (season 2), the president of the Museums of France Union and the leader of the Network.
- Jérôme Le Banner as Gabriel (season 2), Barbara's henchman.
- Léon Plazol as Théo Iribarren (season 2; recurring season 1), a member of the BROCS and Quentin's friend.

=== Co-starring ===
- Carole Bouquet as Hélène Durieux (season 1), a friend of Michaël Heinz who has been taking care of the sisters since his disappearance.
- Ophélia Kolb as Angela Rupert (season 1), an exhibition curator.
- Gilbert Melki as Armand Chassagne (season 1), an art dealer involved with the Network.
- Gilles Cohen as Thomas Godard (season 1), an expert in antiques and works of art.
- Guillaume de Tonquédec as Christian Dalembert (season 1), a businessman and art collector.

=== Recurring ===
- Juliette Plumecocq-Mech as Commissioner Bruneau, the chief of the BRB.
- Loryn Nounay as Lili Perez, Alexia's girlfriend.
- Lilou Ruel as Mona, Alexia's friend.
- Grégory Kristoforoff as Thierry (season 2; guest season 1), a cop working for the Network.

=== Guest ===
- Matthieu Penchinat as Ben, a computer technician for the cops.
- Zoé Clauzure as Young Tam Chamade (season 1)
- Yéléna Polizzi as Young Syl Chamade (season 1)
- Ava Charbit as Young Alex Chamade (season 1)
- Maxence Danet-Fauvel as Nico (season 1), a tour guide that Tamara briefly date.
- Abdé Maziane as Éric (season 1), Christian Dalembert's henchman.
- Grégoire Colin as Octave Ribera (season 2), a banker, art trafficker and Prudence's lover.
- Indochine as Themselves (season 2)
- Noam Sinseau as Nawel (season 2), a staff at a fashion show.
- Rodolphe Sand as Amadeo Vellani (season 2), a fashion designer.

== Episodes ==
Series	Episodes	Originally released		
Series	Episodes	First released	Last released	Network
1	8	11 November 2024 (Note: Prior to its debut in France, the first season aired for the first time in Belgium with two episodes premiering weekly from 6 November 2024 to 27 November 2024 on RTL-TVI.; In France, episodes three to eight were first released weekly on TF1+'s premium plan from 11 November 2024 to 2 December 2024.)	9 December 2024	TF1
2	8	12 October 2026 (Note: Prior to its debut in France, the second season aired for the first time in Belgium with two episodes premiering weekly from 30 September 2026 to 21 October 2026 on RTL-TVI.; In France, episodes three and four were first released on TF1+'s premium plan on 12 October 2026.; In France, episodes five to eight were first released on Disney+'s Hulu hub on 19 October 2026.)	9 November 2026	TF1

=== Season 1 (2024) ===
No.	Title	Directed by	Written by (Note: Alexandre Laurent & Benjamin Dupont-Jubien are credited on all episodes for additional literary material.)	Original release date	France viewers (millions)
1	"Tamara"	Alexandre Laurent	Michel Catz	11 November 2024	5,12
2	"Sylia"	Alexandre Laurent	Justine Kim Gautier, Antonin Martin-Hilbert & Michel Catz	11 November 2024	4,01
3	"Alexia"	Alexandre Laurent	Justine Kim Gautier & Michel Catz	18 November 2024	4,20
4	"Quentin"	Alexandre Laurent	Antonin Martin-Hilbert, Mari Mouazan, Mohamed Benyekhlef & Michel Catz	18 November 2024	3,54
5	"Gwen"	Alexandre Laurent	Sophie Maurer & Michel Catz	25 November 2024	4,08
6	"Prudence"	Alexandre Laurent	Justine Kim Gautier, Antonin Martin-Hilbert & Michel Catz	25 November 2024	3,51
7	"Durrieux"	Alexandre Laurent	Coline Dussaud, Anne-Charlotte Kassab & Michel Catz	2 December 2024	3,79
8	"Heinz"	Alexandre Laurent	Audrey Gagneux, Anne-Charlotte Kassab & Michel Catz	9 December 2024	3,92

=== Season 2 (2026) ===
No.	Title	Directed by	Written by	Original release date	France viewers (millions)
1	"Un nouvel espoir"	Alexandre Laurent	Michel Catz	12 October 2026	3,41
2	"L'inconnu du train"	Alexandre Laurent	Émilie Pertuis	12 October 2026	2,57
3	"L'affaire du collier"	Alexandre Laurent	Coline Dussaud	19 October 2026	2,90
4	"La revenante"	Alexandre Laurent	Léa Barthe	19 October 2026	2,30
5	"Extraction"	Alexandre Laurent	Anaïs Carpita	26 October 2026	2,89
6	"Insaisissables"	Alexandre Laurent	Coline Dussaud & Léa Barthe	26 October 2026	2,42
7	"Haute voltige"	Alexandre Laurent	Émilie Pertuis & Léa Barthe	2 November 2026	2,62
8	"Une dernière nuit au musée"	Alexandre Laurent	TBA	9 November 2026	TBD

== Production ==
=== Development ===
In April 2023, the TF1 Group announced a French live-action adaptation of the Japanese manga series Cat's Eye by Tsukasa Hojo.

The series was in development for TF1 and Amazon Prime Video. Benjamin Dupont-Jubien and Mehdi Sabbar were set to produce under Big Band Story. The two producers revealed that they were working on the project since 2017 although they had yet to obtain the rights from Hojo. The artist was convinced as he thought that the idea of modernizing the story was good, and liked the Parisian setting.

To Frenchify the series, the production kept the names used for the characters in the French dub of the 1983 anime series, which had used French names despite taking place in Japan. A new version of the anime's French opening theme, titled "Signé Cat's Eyes" ("Signed Cat's Eyes"), was recorded for the series by Anne Sila.

In February 2025, the series was renewed for a second season, with Disney+ replacing Prime Video as co-financier.

=== Casting ===
In June 2023, Camille Lou, Constance Labbé and Claire Romain were cast for the roles of the three sisters. The series is the third collaboration between Lou and director Alexandre Laurent after the TF1/Netflix's limited series The Bonfire of Destiny, and Women at War.

Singer Mohamed Belkhir, known as MB14, was cast as Quentin Chapuis. Belkhir was offered to audition for the role through his agent, who knew the series's casting director. In October 2023, Carole Bouquet and Élodie Fontan joined the cast. This is the second time Fontan stars in a French adaptation of a Tsukasa Hojo manga after the 2018 film Nicky Larson et le parfum de Cupidon, based on City Hunter.

In May 2025, it was announced that Cindy Bruna and Grégory Fitoussi would not be returning for season two due to a scheduling conflict, and that both of their roles had been recast with Tamara Marthe and Arnaud Binard, respectively. Lola Dewaere and Tom Leeb also joined the cast.

=== Filming ===
The first season began shooting in October 2023 in Île-de-France, mainly in Paris. Scenes were filmed at the Eiffel Tower, the Louvre, the Guimet Museum, the Monnaie de Paris, the Accor Arena, and at the Palace of Versailles. The ball scene at Versailles in the third episode was filmed at Vaux-le-Vicomte as the palace do not allow the filming of scenes with crowds or dancing in order to protect the floor. Belgian gymnast and pole vaulter Chloé Henry was Camille Lou stunt double for some of the actions scenes.

The second season began shooting on 15 May 2025 with scenes filmed at the Musée d'Orsay, the Centre Pompidou, the Tour Montparnasse, the Mont-Saint-Michel, and at the Viaduc de Barajol.

== Release ==
=== France ===
Cat's Eyes premiered on TF1 with its first two episodes on 11 November 2024, with subsequent episodes released weekly. Two episodes premiered every week, except for the last two. When new episodes aired on TF1, the following ones were simultaneously made available in advance for subscribers to TF1+'s premium plan.

The first season got a second-window release on 18 December 2024 on Amazon Prime Video, following the service participation in the series funding. On 22 May 2026, the season was released on Disney+'s Hulu hub. The service later took over Prime Video as co-financier for the second season.

The second season premiered on TF1 with its first two episodes on 12 October 2026, with subsequent episodes released weekly. Similar to the first season, two episodes premieres every week, except for the last two, while episodes from the following week are simultaneously made available in advance for subscribers to TF1+'s premium plan. While the first two episodes were released simultaneously on Disney+'s Hulu hub, the full season was released in advance on the service on 19 October 2026, without any prior announcement.

On DVD, the first season is set to be released on 11 December 2026, while the second season will be release on 22 January 2027, both by Studio TF1 with distribution handled by Seven Sept.

=== International ===
Prior to its debut in France, the series first premiered in French speaking regions of Belgium and Switzerland on 6 November 2024 on RTL-TVI, and on 8 November on RTS 1.

The first season was produced in association with Amazon Prime Video, giving the series's rights to the service in select regions, including Japan, where it was released on 18 December 2024. In Spain, the series premiered on 29 May 2025 on AMC+ ; in Germany, on 18 July 2025 on ZDF Mediathek ; in Italy, on 15 September 2025 on RaiPlay ; and in Portugal, on 29 July 2026 on AMC.

On 22 May 2026, the first season premiered in the United States on Hulu, a service owned by The Walt Disney Company. On 22 September, it was announced that Disney+ took over Prime Video as co-financier on the series, making the show available internationally on the Hulu hub from December 2026, excluding France, Belgium, Switzerland, Spain, Germany, Italy and Portugal where the service will have the second-window rights.
