= Les Fatals Picards =

French rock/punk band

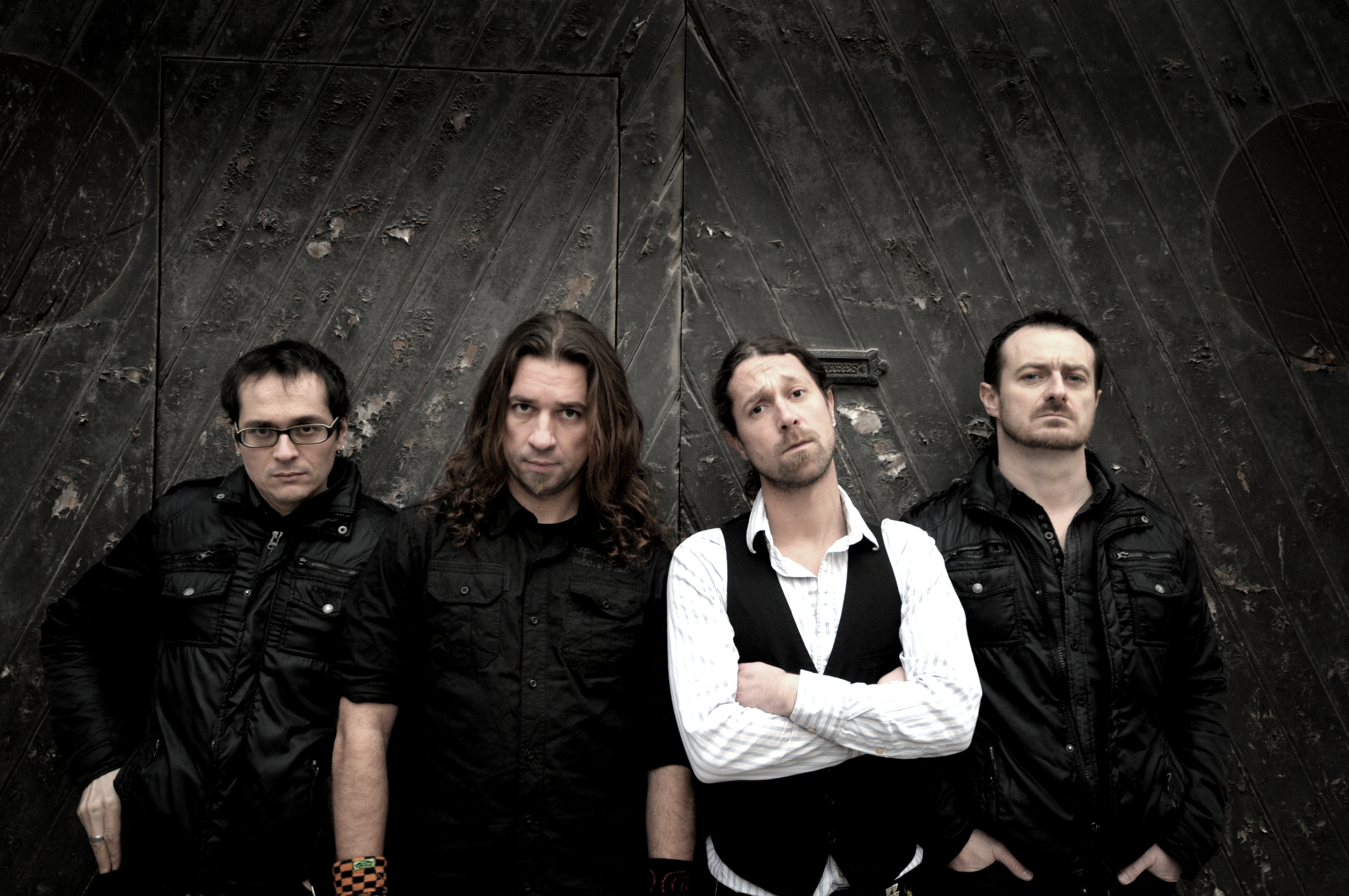
- Les Fatals Picards

Background information
- Origin: France
- Genres: Rock, punk, pop, ska
- Years active: 1998 – present
- Label: Warner Bros. Records
- Members: Laurent Honel; Jean-Marc Sauvagnargues; Paul Léger; Yves Giraud
- Past members: Ivan Callot; Regis Rodrigues; Gilles Di Giovanni; Eric Charpentier; Olivier Delafosse; Jonathan Bénisty
- Website: www.fatalspicards.com

Les Fatals Picards is a French rock/punk band, founded in 1996.

The Fatals Picards (meaning "the fatal [men] from Picardy") are best known to general audiences because they represented France in the Eurovision Song Contest 2007 with the song "L'Amour à la française" (Eng: "Love, French Style"), after winning the national selection.

== Characteristics ==
The lyrics of the Fatals Picards are often of a parodic or humoristic character, though some songs, more particularly in the recent years, are more of a militant left-wing kind.

Some of their songs are satiric:

- L'enterrement de Derrick ("the burial of Derrick"), about the namesake character of the German police TV series Derrick.
- Le jour de la mort de Johnny ("the day of the death of Johnny"), about French rock singer Johnny Hallyday. The Fatals Picards and Johnny Hallyday were both at the same record company, Warner Bros. Records, who decided not to include the song on the album
- Les Bourgeois — fake left-wing militant song, probably satirizing militant bands such as Têtes Raides; the title is reminiscent of a famous song by Jacques Brel.
- Cure Toujours, about Goth youth imitating the looks and appreciating the music of The Cure. The guitar and vocals are reminiscent of Indochine.
- Sauvons Vivendi, parody of songs from e.g. Band Aid that attempt raising awareness about humanitarian causes... but in this case, calling for help for the industrial and financial group Vivendi and stock traders.
- Commandante, parody of songs by e.g. Noir Désir, mixing somewhat confused but strongly expressed left-wing political messages and somewhat meaningless Spanish lyrics meant to give a South American feel (in the Fatals song, the Spanish backing vocals are actually road directions).
- Monter le Pantalon, parody of Tomber la chemise by Zebda.
- Bernard Lavilliers, satirizing the image of French singer Bernard Lavilliers as a former adventurer active in South America, who has "seen it all".
- C'est l'histoire d'une meuf, parody of the video for a song by humanitarian band les Enfoirés. The Fatals Picards accuse some of the singers in that band of being in there only to restart a flagging career.
- Chasse, pêche et biture, a jab at hunters, accused of being drunk too often. The title is also a jab at the fringe political party Hunting, Fishing, Nature, Tradition.
- Boum parodies the songs from French rock band Superbus (accused of having lousy lyrics centering on teenage loves and parties).
- Je viens d'ici, satire of alleged bigotry in Corsica.
- Et puis merde, je vote à droite ("Fuck it, I vote right-wing"): a man discovers that he prefers voting right-wing, and all of a sudden appreciates right-wing artists and professes conservative social views.

Musical influences range from straight rock to punk, chanson, etc.

== Eurovision 2007 ==
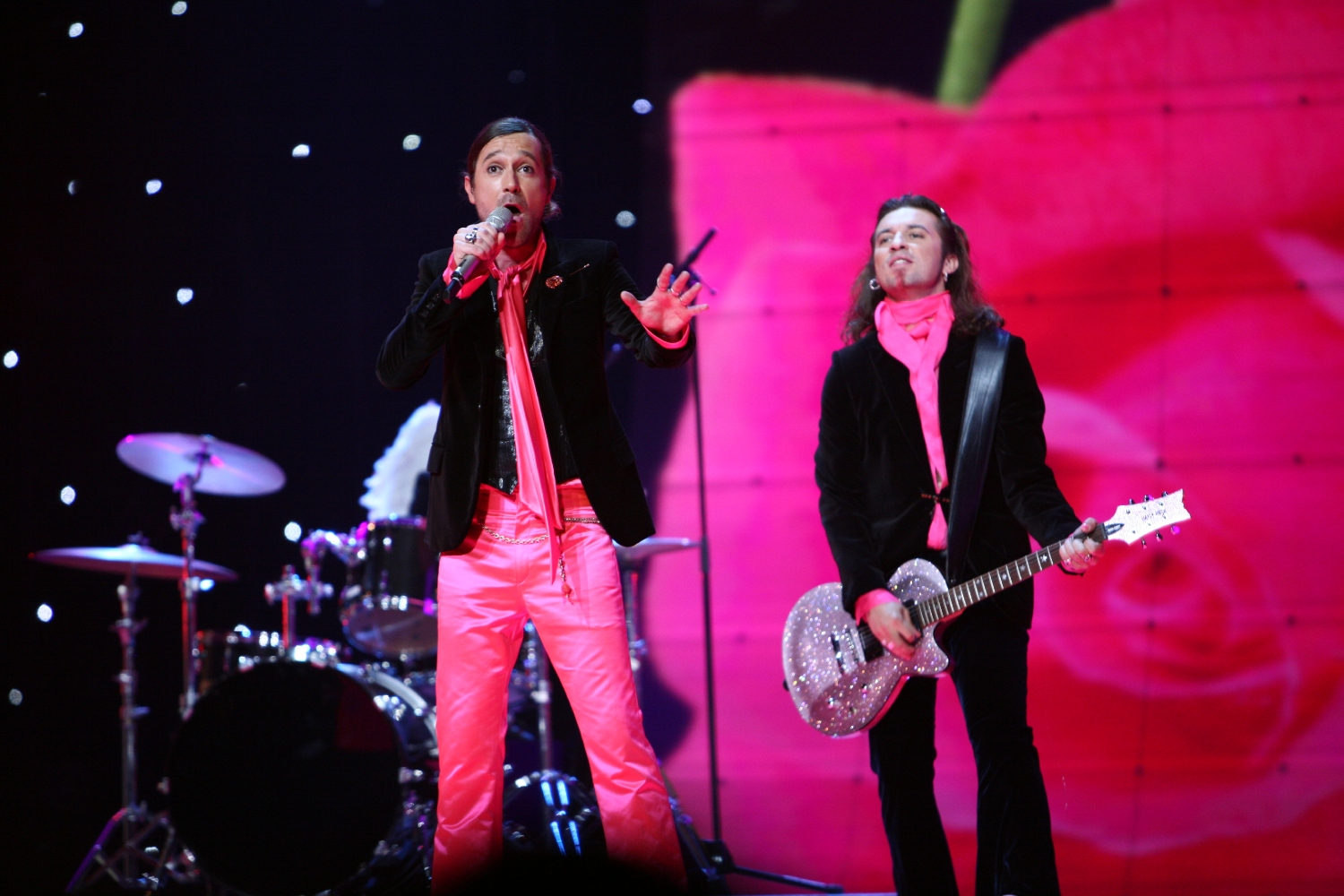
Eurovision 2007 in front Leadsinger Paul Léger, behind bass guitarist Yves Giraud

Les Fatals Picards represented France in Eurovision Song Contest 2007 in Helsinki, Finland with the bilingual French/English song "L'Amour à la française" (meaning "Love - the French way"). They finished 22nd overall in 24 finalists.

== Band members ==
- Laurent Honel : guitar/singing/bass (2000-)
- Jean-Marc Sauvagnargues : Drums(2002-)
- Paul Léger : Lead Singer (2004-)
- Yves Giraud : bass (2005-)

Former member

- Ivan Callot : Lead Singer (-December 2007)

== Discography ==
Earlier materials

- Amiens c'est aussi le tien - D.I.Y. (2000) (the title is a pun)
- Navet Maria - Next Music - (2001) (the title is a pun on Ave Maria and "turnip", which is also slang for "bad film" in French)
- Droit de véto - Next Music - (2003)
- Picardia Independenza (2005) (the title and sleeve cover are faux Corsican independentist, except that Corsica is replaced by Picardy and the emblem of Corsica is replaced by a beet, one of the major crops of Picardy)

Charting studio albums

Year	Album	Peak positions	Certification
Year	Album	FRA	Certification
2007	Pamplemousse Mécanique	24	
2009	Le sens de la gravité	17	
2011	Coming out	32	
2013	Septième ciel	28	
2016	Fatals Picards Country Club	11	
2019	Espèces Menacées		
2022	Le Syndrome de Göteborg		

Live albums

Year	Album	Peak positions	Certification
Year	Album	FRA	Certification
2008	Public	60	
2011	Fatals s/ scène	52	
2015	14.11.14		

Preceded by Virginie Pouchain with Il était temps	France in the Eurovision Song Contest; 2007	Succeeded by Sébastien Tellier with Divine
