= Fabien Incardona =

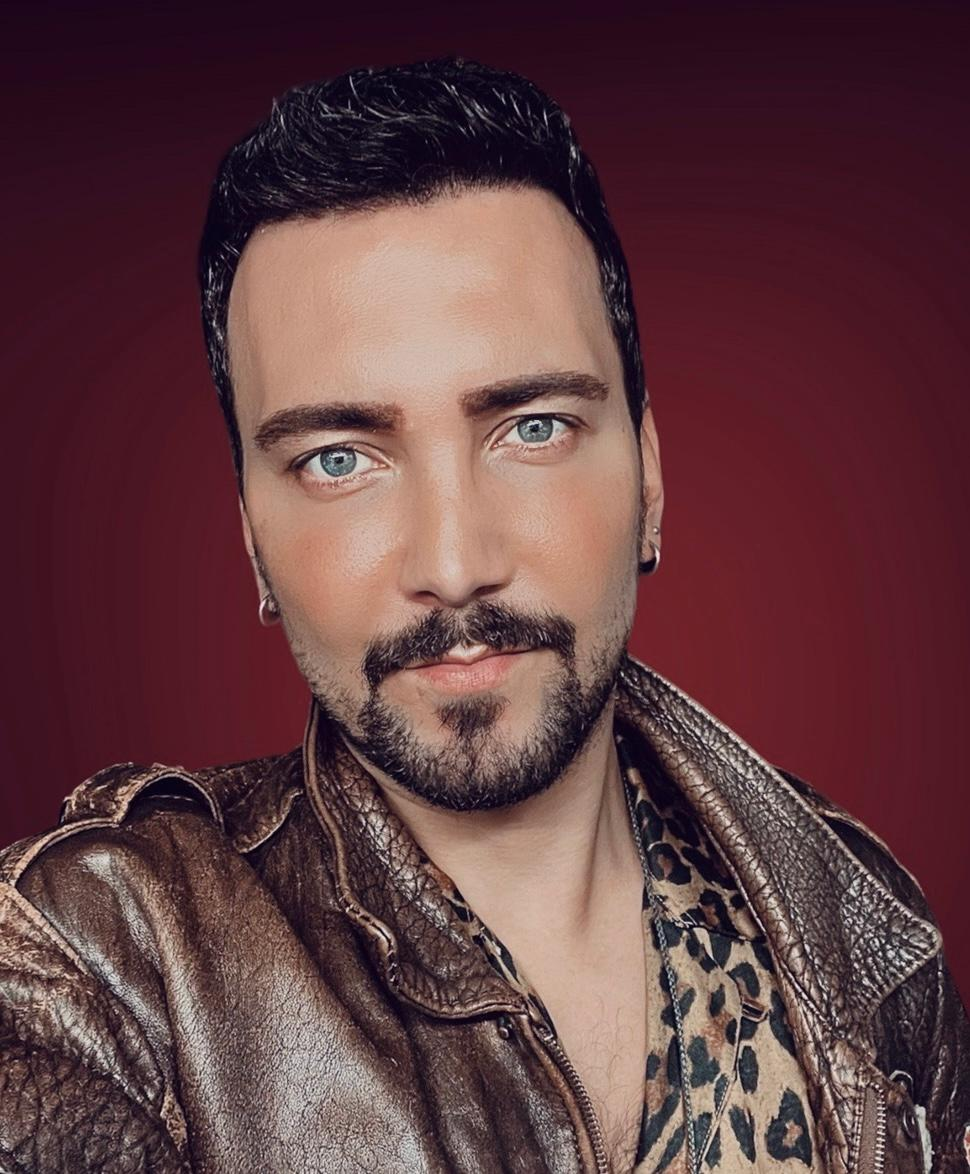

Background information
- Born: May 18, 1985 (age 41); Six-Fours-les-Plages, France
- Origin: France
- Genres: Rock
- Years active: 2006–present
- Label: Warner
- Website: fabienincardona.fr/

Fabien Incardona (born May 18, 1985 at Six-Fours-les-Plages, France), is a French singer.

== Biography ==
Fabien Incardona studied acting and singing at age 8. He was on stages with bands and was candidate in 2006 at the French Eurovision Song Contest and finished second behind Virginie Pouchain.

In 2007, Fabien joined the musical Roméo et Juliette, les enfants de Vérone by Gérard Presgurvic in France and on tour in Asia.

In 2011, he moved to Paris and became the singer of the band Gravity off. An EP has been released and the band made concerts in Paris.

In January 2014, Fabien participated at The Voice: la plus belle voix. He is not chosen by the jury but his cover from Kate Bush gave him the opportunity to make his first solo EP Change with the help of 201 producers on MyMajorCompany.

In October 2014, Fabien was candidate at Rising Star (TV series) during two shows.

In 2015, the producer Dove Attia (Mozart, l'opéra rock, 1789: Les Amants de la Bastille) offered him the role of Maleagant in the musical La Légende du roi Arthur with Florent Mothe, Charlie Boisseau, Zaho, and Camille Lou in Paris and on tour through France, Belgium, and Switzerland. With his voice and his performance Fabien is acclaimed by French newspapers.

In 2017, Fabien Incardona changed his stage name to INCA. His new album Je vivrai is edited with 12 tracks with the favor of a crowdfunding.

In September 2018, INCA edited a new EP Je me sens vivant.

In 2019, he played the main part of the show Siddharta in Paris.

== Discography ==
- 2013 : Dust to Rise with the band Gravity off, EP
- 2014 : Change, EP
- 2017 : Je vivrai
- 2018 : Je me sens vivant, EP
- 2022 : Je me demande, EP
- 2023 : Incantation

=== Participation ===
- 2015 : La Légende du roi Arthur
- 2019 : Siddharta

== Musicals ==
- 2007–2010 : Roméo et Juliette, les enfants de Vérone by Gérard Presgurvic, dir Redha – Asia, Palais des Congrès de Paris
- 2015–2016 : La Légende du roi Arthur by Dove Attia – Palais des Congrès de Paris, tour
- 2019–2020 : Siddhartha l’Opéra Rock by David Clément-Bayard and Antoine Markus – Dôme de Paris

== Award ==
=== Nomination ===
- NRJ Music Award 2015 : Francophone Duo/Group of the Year
