= Matheson Bayley =

British musician (born 1978)

Matheson Bayley (born 15 December 1978) is an English pianist, composer, orchestrator, singer and television host. He was born in Chertsey, Surrey, England, and studied commercial composition at the Royal Academy of Music, London. Having worked as a musical director of musical theatre in London's West End, and as a composer/arranger for television, he is particularly noted for his album Native Hue, recorded with Cypriot singer Alex Panayi; and for having presented the Eurovision Song Contest behind-the-scenes documentary, Magic Moments in 2006 and 2009.

Bayley has orchestrated for the Mantovani Orchestra; Joy Tobing, the winner of Indonesian Idol 2004, on her debut album, Rise; Giorgos Alkaios' 2012 album, Déjà vu; Rickard Engfors (Swedish tour 2005); arranged the vocals on the third album of Hi-5; as well as having sung on the soundtracks of the Disney films The Wild, Brother Bear 2, Oliver and Company, The Three Caballeros, Saludos Amigos, Leroy and Stitch, Make Mine Music, James and the Giant Peach, Basil the Great Mouse Detective, Fun and Fancy Free, The Adventures of Ichabod and Mr Toad, Brother Bear 2, The Fox and the Hound 2, Teacher's Pet, The Book of Pooh, Mickey's House of Villains, Mickey Mouse Clubhouse, Up, Up, and Away and Melody Time; as well as on the Tim Burton picture, The Nightmare Before Christmas, the PlayStation video game The Little Mermaid II: Return to the Sea, and DreamWorks' Shrek 2 – (Greek dubbed versions).

Bayley also appeared on stage playing cello at the 2006 Eurovision Song Contest during the French performance of Virginie Pouchain; wrote the lyric to the Interval Act of the Eurovision Song Contest 2013 Final, entitled "Swedish Smörgåsbord", with Edward af Sillén and Daniel Réhn; and, with the same team, wrote the lyric for the Eurovision Song Contest 2016 Semi-Final 2 Opening Number, "That's Eurovision" (aka "Story of ESC"/"Story of Eurovision"), performed by Petra Mede and Måns Zelmerlöw, for which Bayley was also the recording producer and composer.
