= Les Marchands de rêves =

Studio album by Corneille
- Released: 2005
- Recorded: 2005
- Label: Wagram Music

Corneille chronology
Parce qu'on vient de loin (édition deluxe) (2003)	Les Marchands de rêves (2005)	The Birth of Corneillius (2007)

Les Marchands de rêves is a 2005 studio album of Corneille that became the most successful of his albums reaching #3 in the French Albums Chart.

In 2006, the album was rereleased as a package Parce qu'on vient de loin / Les Marchands de rêves with the debut studio album of Corneille Parce qu'on vient de loin

== Track listing ==
1. "Reposez en paix"
2. "Lettre à la maison blanche"
3. "Si tu savais"
4. "Sur la tombe de mes gens"
5. "Petite sœur"
6. "Le bon Dieu est une femme"
7. "Les marchands de rêves"
8. "Notre jour viendra"
9. "A vie"
10. "Iwacu"
11. "Toujours le même"
12. "Ca arrive"
13. "Quand on aime tant"
14. "Viens"
