= La Légende du roi Arthur =

- Quand l'amour change le cours de l'histoire
- Official poster for the 2015 premier in Paris
- Music: Zaho, Skread, Frédéric Savio
- Lyrics: Francois Chouquet
- Book: Dove Attia
- Premiere: 17 September 2015: Palais des congrès de Paris

La Légende du roi Arthur is a French-language musical comedy written by Dove Attia that premiered in Paris in September 2015. The show then toured through France, Belgium, and Switzerland.

== Synopsis ==
The show opens with Merlin gathering the people together to select the new king of Britain by pulling the sword Excalibur from a stone. All members of the nobility who attempt to remove the sword fail and a tournament is organised in the hope of finding the one worthy to retrieve Excalibur. Arthur is a young groom in the service of his adoptive brother. When he loses his brother's sword for the tournament, Arthur, unaware of its significance, pulls the sword from the stone. His action is seen by several people and he is hailed as the new king.

Some members of the nobility pledge allegiance to Arthur, whereas others argue against crowning a man of lowly birth. Merlin reveals Arthur's true identity as the son of the last king, Uther Pendragon, but some, led by Maleagant, refuse to accept the rule of an illegitimate royal child and declare war.

Merlin takes Arthur to the Forest of Brocéliande to train him. Here, Arthur is called to the aid of one of his loyal lords, whose castle is besieged by Maleagant. With Merlin's magic, Arthur successfully breaks the siege, but is wounded. He is nursed by the lord's daughter, Guinevere, whom Arthur falls in love with and pledges to marry. Merlin predicts that Guinevere will somehow be the cause of Arthur's downfall.

Before the wedding, Arthur's half-sister, Morgane, arrives at Camelot and seduces Arthur by taking on Guinevere's appearance. She becomes pregnant and vows that her child will inherit Arthur's kingdom. Morgane then unites with Maleagant to prevent Arthur's marriage to Guinevere. Some time later, the wedding celebrations have been prepared, but are disrupted by the arrival of Lancelot, who immediately falls in love with Guinevere. Despite their attraction to each other and Morgane's schemes to bring the two lovers together, Guinevere and Lancelot resist remain faithful to Arthur.

== Cast ==
=== Singers ===
King Arthur - Florent Mothe
Morgan le Fay - Zaho
Guinevere - Camille Lou
Lancelot - Charlie Boisseau
Maleagant - Fabien Incardona

=== Actors ===
Merlin - David Alexis
Gawain - Dan Menasche
The Man of the People, The Spirit, and Urien - Julien Lamassonne
Leïa, accomplice to Morgane - Tamara Fernando
Kay, Arthur's half-brother - Yamin Dib, Olivier Mathieu

== Songs ==
1. L'ouverture d'Excalibur - Instrumental
2. Le chant du dragon - Instrumental, Ensemble
3. Advienne que pourra - Maleagant
4. Jeux dangereux - Instrumental
5. Qui suis-je? - King Arthur, Merlin
6. La danse des guerriers - Instrumental
7. Rêver l'impossible - Guinevere
8. Quelque chose de magique - King Arthur, Guinevere
9. Un nouveau départ - Maleagant
10. Au diable - Guinevere
11. A l'enfant - Morgan le Fay
12. Tu vas le payer - Morgan le Fay
13. Délivre-nous - The Man of the People
14. Le serment d'Arthur - King Arthur
15. Si je te promets - King Arthur, Guinevere, Lancelot
16. Jeux dangereux (Reprise) - Instrumental
17. Dors Morgane, dors - The Spirit, Morgan le Fay
18. Ce que la vie a fait de moi - Morgan le Fay
19. L'Amour. Quel idiot... - Lancelot
20. Je me relève - King Arthur
21. Faire comme si - Lancelot, Guinevere
22. À nos voeux sacrés - Maleagant, Morgan le Fay
23. Wake up - Lancelot
24. Nos corps à la dérive - Maleagant, Guinevere
25. Il est temps - Guinevere, Lancelot
26. Mon combat - Morgan le Fay, King Arthur
27. Tout est joué (Le chant du dragon) - Merlin
28. Auprès d'un autre - King Arthur
29. Quelque chose de magique (Reprise) - Troupe

=== Songs not included in the musical ===
1. Qu'ils me traitent d'idiot - Lancelot
2. Promis c'est juré - Troupe
3. Le monde est parfait - Lancelot
4. Tant de haine - Maleagant
5. Il est temps - Troupe

== Awards and honours ==
Year	Award	Category	Nominee	Result	Ref
2015	NRJ Music Award	Francophone Duo/Group of the Year	Florent Mothe & Camille Lou	Nominated	

== Adaptations ==
La Légende du roi Arthur has been adapted by the Japanese theatre troupe Takarazuka Revue, who performed it at the Bunkyo Civic Center, Tokyo in September 2016. La Légende du roi Arthur has also been adapted and performed at the Chungmu Arts Center, Grand Theater, Seoul from March to June 2019.
