= Florent Mothe =

French singer, actor and musician (born 1981)

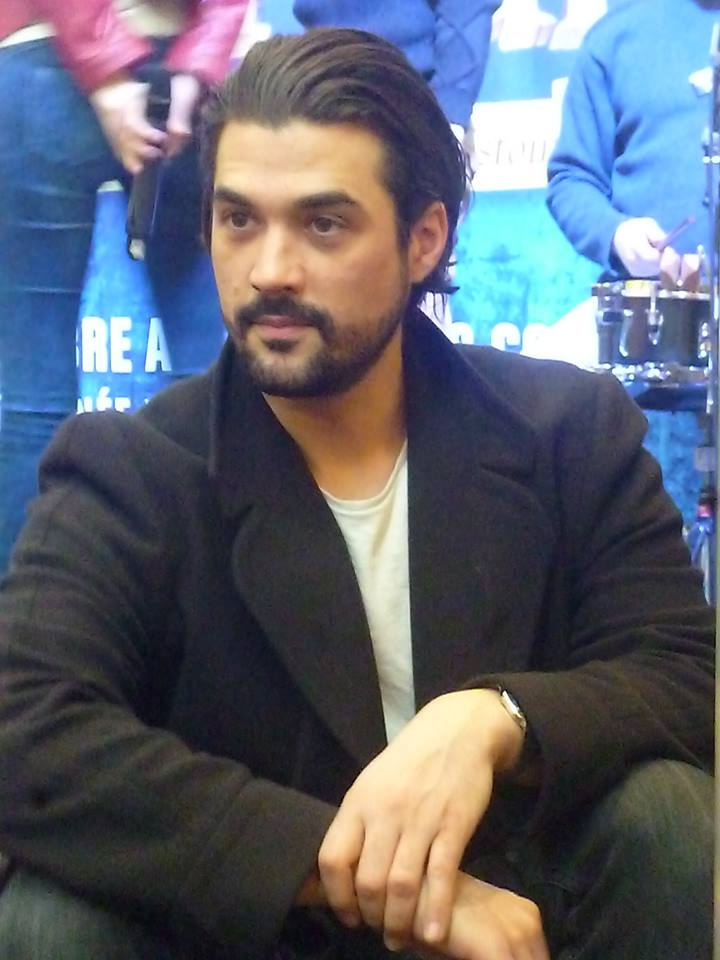
- Florent Mothe in 2015

Background information
- Birth name: Florent Mothe
- Also known as: Flow; Billy Romance
- Born: May 13, 1981 (age 44) Argenteuil, Île-de-France, France
- Genres: Pop, Rock, Jazz, Metal
- Occupation(s): Singer, Musician, Composer, Actor
- Instrument(s): Vocals, Guitar, Flute, Piano, Bass
- Years active: 1997–present
- Labels: Warner Music France

Florent Mothe (French pronunciation: [flɔʁɑ̃ mɔt]; born May 13, 1981) is a French singer, actor and musician.

He is most famous for playing the role of Antonio Salieri in Mozart, l'opéra rock. In this role, he performed on a number of singles including Vivre à en crever, l'Assasymphonie, and Le bien qui fait mal.

== Biography ==
Florent Mothe was born on May 13, 1981, in Argenteuil, Val-d'Oise. He began studying music at the age of 7, at the Montigny-lès-Cormeilles school. He soon learned to play the flute, piano, bass, synthesizer and guitar, but singing was always his primary interest.

He formed his first band, Lost Smile, in 1996, and toured for around six years between France and Germany. At the same time, he played the savant in the musical l'Alphoméga, on the recording and in one performance of the show. Following that, he sang at the Hard Rock Café with his second group, Ouija. He then went to Toronto, where he began a solo career. He performed short concerts in Canadian bars, as well as at the Mod Club in New York.

His performances and recordings on his Myspace page brought him to the attention of Dove Attia and Albert Cohen, producers of Mozart, l'opéra rock, who invited him to attend casting for the musical. He was chosen for the role of Antonio Salieri. In 2010, he was awarded the title of "Francophone Discovery of the year" at the NRJ Music Awards.

His first solo album, Rock in Chair, was released in April 2013. The first single is called Je ne sais pas.

Florent played King Arthur in Dove Attia's new musical La Légende du roi Arthur with Charlie Boisseau, Zaho, Camille Lou and Fabien Incardona in 2015.

== Discography ==
=== Albums ===
Year	Album	Peak positions	
Year	Album	FRA	BEL (Wa)
2013	Rock In Chair	14	21
2016	Danser Sous La Pluie	73	71

=== Singles ===
Year	Singles	Peak positions	
Year	Singles	FRA	BEL (Wa)
2009	"Vivre à en crever" (duet with Mikelangelo Loconte)	–	4 (Ultratip)
2009	"L'assasymphonie"	–	10 (Ultratop)
2012	"On ira" (duet with Judith)	178	–
2013	"Je ne sais pas"	77	50 (Ultratop)
2013	"Les blessures qui ne se voient pas"	79	25 (Ultratip)
2015	"Quelque chose de magique" (with Camille Lou)	103	15 (Ultratip)
2016	"Auprès d'un autre"		43
2016	"Quoi de neuf?"	146	

with the cast of Mozart, l'opéra rock

Year	Singles	Peak positions	
Year	Singles	FRA	BEL (Wa)
2009/ 2010	"Le bien qui fait mal"	9	8 (Ultratip)
2010	"C'est bientôt la fin"	22	25 (Ultratop)

with the cast of La Légende du roi Arthur

Year	Singles	Peak positions		Singles
Year	Singles	FRA	BEL (Wa)	Singles
2014	"Mon combat (Tir nam beo)" (with Zaho)	187	–	from La Légende du roi Arthur

== Awards ==
- 2010 NRJ Music Award for "L'Assasymphonie": Francophone Song of the Year 2009
- 2010 NRJ Music Award as member of the cast of Mozart l'Opéra Rock: Francophone Duo/Group of the Year
