= Juliette Plumecocq-Mech =

French actor

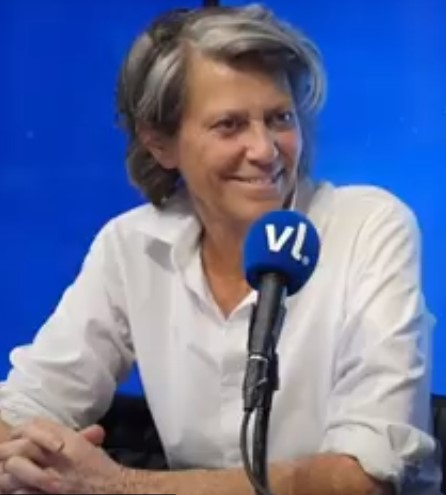
- Juliette Plumecocq-Mech (2023)
- Occupation: Actress
- Years active: 1993–present

Juliette Plumecocq-Mech is a French actress.

== Biography ==
Originally from Bordeaux, she entered the Bordeaux Conservatory of Dramatic Arts. She then joined Ariane Mnouchkine's Théâtre du Soleil troupe. There she met the actor Christophe Rauck who created the Compagnie Terrain Vague in 1995, which Juliette joined.

Because of her androgynous physique, Christophe Rauck also entrusted her with male roles (Lancelot in Le Dragon, Khlestakov in Le Révizor, Aristarque in Cœur ardent), and in 2016 directed her in an original text where she plays, lying down, a man assaulted in a cafe.

Juliette Plumecocq-Mech is also pursuing a career in cinema (with Romain Goupil, and Jean-Pierre Améris) and television (the series Cherif, Le Tueur du lac).

In 2021, she appeared in the play A la vie by Élise Chatauret, Thomas Pondevie and the Compagnie Babel.

== Filmography ==
- 2011 : Mon arbre of Bérenice André: Lydia
- 2012 : Radiostars de Romain Lévy: Daniel(le)
- 2014 : Les Jours venus of Romain Goupil: Guide aveugle
- 2018 : Je vais mieux of Jean-Pierre Améris: la radiologue
- 2018 : Je ne suis pas un homme facile of Éléonore Pourriat: la borgne
- 2018 : Tous les dieux du ciel of Quarxx: la garagiste
- 2020 : Médecin de nuit of Élie Wajeman : Chloé
- 2020 : Antoinette dans les Cévennes of Caroline Vignal : Brintney
- 2022 : Les Vedettes of Jonathan Barré : Patricia
- 2022 : Trois fois rien of Nadège Loiseau; the doctor

== Television ==
- 2014 : Saison 4 de Hero Corp : Iancu
- 2014 : Meurtres au Pays basque of Éric Duret : Faustine
- 2015 : Saison 2 des Petits Meurtres d'Agatha Christie, épisode Murder Party: Greenblat
- 2017 : Cherif, épisode La dernière séance : Nathalie Marchal
- 2017 : Transferts, série : Fausto
- 2017 : Le Tueur du lac, series of Jérôme Cornuau : Jeanne Tardieu
- 2018 : Tunnel, series of Anders Engstrom : Betty
- 2019 : Engrenages, saison 7
- 2019 : Saison 2 Balthazar, Épisode 9, La loi du plus fort : Catherine Meyer
- 2020 : Peur sur le lac, mini-series of Jérôme Cornuau : Jeanne Tardieu
- 2020 : Le Mensonge, mini-series of Vincent Garenq : La présidente du tribunal
- 2022 : Vise le cœur, mini-series of Vincent Jamain : doctor Grandjean
- 2022 : Vortex, mini-series of Slimane-Baptiste Berhoun : Agathe
- 2022 : Alex Hugo of Olivier Langlois, épisode : En terre sauvage : Anne Barois
- 2022 : Bellefond of Emilie Barbault and Sarah Barbault, téléfilm : Andrée Cranjeon
- 2024 : Cat's Eyes : Bruneau
- 2025 : Surface
