= Corneille (singer) =

Canadian singer

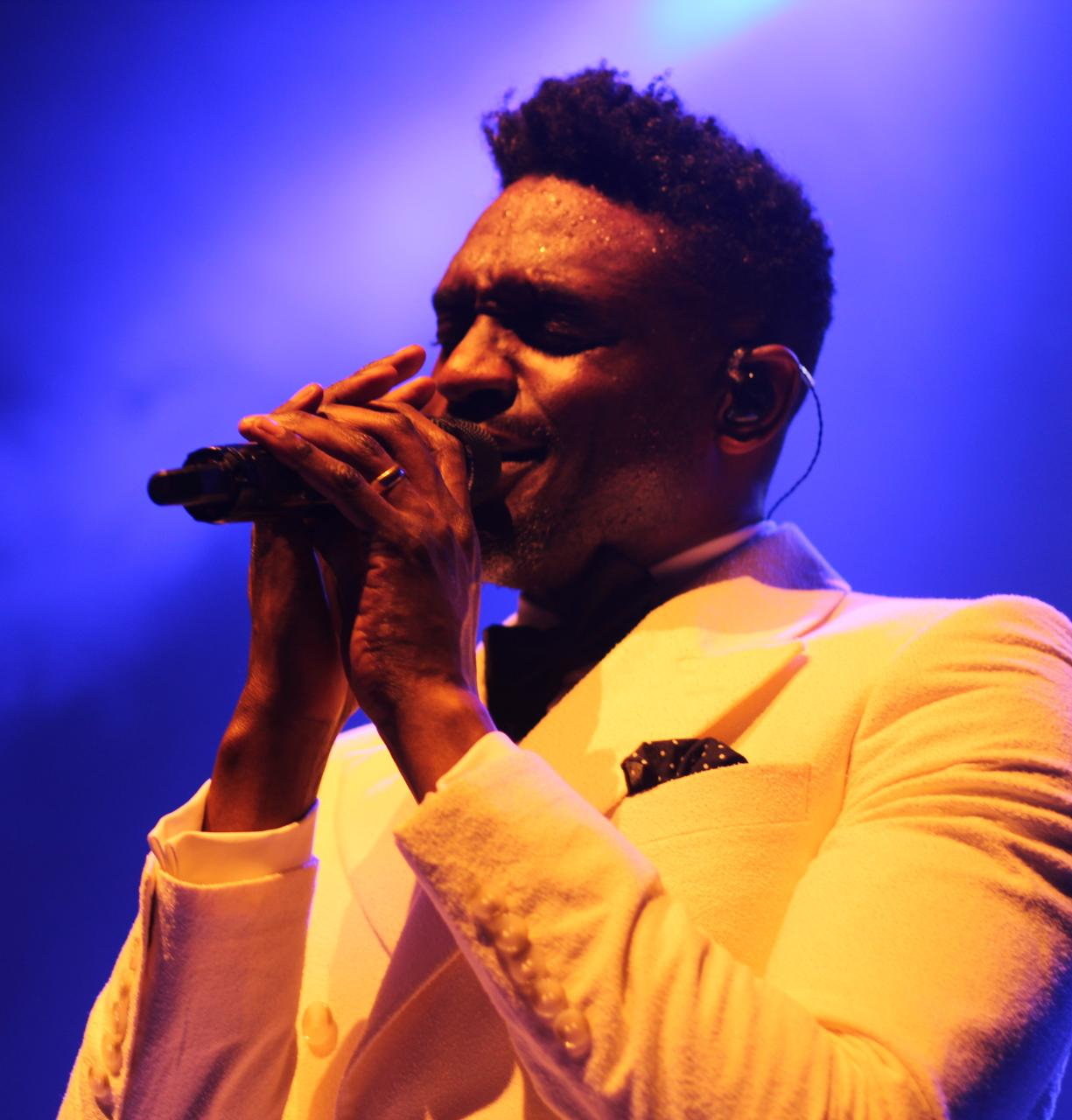
- Corneille performing in 2019

Background information
- Born: Cornelius Nyungura; 24 March 1977 (age 49); Freiburg im Breisgau, West Germany
- Origin: Rwanda
- Genres: R&B; soul; French pop
- Occupations: Singer; songwriter
- Years active: 1993–present

Cornelius Nyungura (born 24 March 1977), known by his stage name Corneille, is a German-Rwandan naturalized Canadian R&B singer. He was born in West Germany to Rwandan parents. He spent most of his childhood in Rwanda, and eventually emigrated to Quebec, Canada, in 1997. He sings in French and English. His work is greatly influenced by American funk and soul music; he is inspired by Prince, Marvin Gaye and Stevie Wonder.

== Early life ==
Corneille was born in Freiburg im Breisgau, Germany, although he spent much of his childhood in Rwanda. He discovered his passion for music in 1993, and so joined an R&B group, who won the Découverte 1993 competition. This also introduced him to songwriting and musical composition. However, his life changed after the Rwandan genocide in 1994. His father, Émile Nyungura, was a leader of the political party PSD thought to be opposed to the government and therefore a target; Corneille witnessed the assassination of his parents and his three brothers and sisters when he was 17 years old. He fled to Germany, where some of his parents' friends took him in.

== Career ==
In July 1997, Corneille decided to leave Germany in order to pursue studies in communication, and moved to Montreal, Canada, to attend Concordia University. During this time, he founded O.N.E., an R&B band, with Pierre Gage and Gardy Martin, whom he had met shortly after arriving in Quebec. Zoukin, one of the group's songs written by Corneille, rose to first place in Canadian airplay. Then, at the beginning of 2001, Corneille left the group, wishing to pursue a solo career. He began to centre his songs on his past. During 2002, Corneille worked on various projects. He wrote and composed the songs "Ce soir" for the Cocktail R&B 2 compilation (Ghetto R&B, Sony Music) and "Si seulement on s'aimait" for Hip Hop Folies (Sony Music). Invited by Dave Stewart, he performed at his first showcase at the Réservoir in Paris, and had the chance to sing with Jimmy Cliff. In January 2003, he was invited to perform as an opening act for Cunnie Williams at the Olympia.

Corneille's first album, the Canadian version of Parce qu'on vient de loin, was released on 10 September 2002. The French version, which included numerous bonuses on the second disc, was released on 20 October 2003, and quickly became successful. In April 2003, Corneille sang with Craig David, repeating a verse in French in the song Rise and Fall. He undertook his first tour during May 2003, playing to full houses in Paris, Marseille, Lyon and Bordeaux. In March 2005, the singer participated in the concert Africa Live, which was organised to fight against (malaria) paludism. This was the first time that he had returned to his home continent since the genocide. Les marchands de rêves, Corneille's second album, was released in November 2005. Corneille has worked with the Canadian Red Cross to raise awareness of children who are victims of war. He released his first English-language album, The Birth of Cornelius, in July 2007. In late 2014 he became a contestant on the fifth season of the French television channel TF1's Danse avec les Stars.

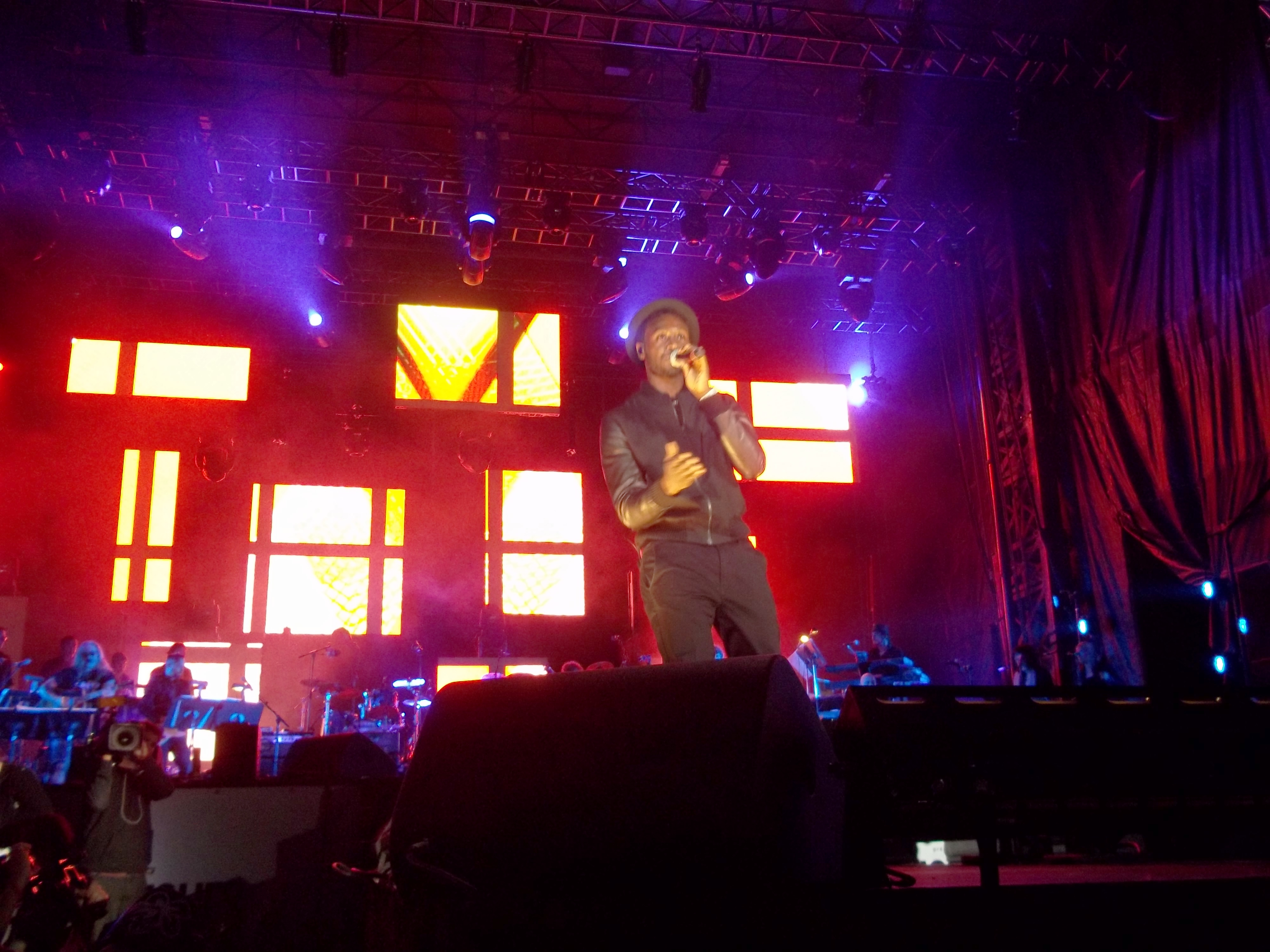
Corneille performing in 2013

=== Other ===
Corneille wrote the song "Il était temps" for Virginie Pouchain after she qualified to represent France in the Eurovision Song Contest 2006. The song finished 22nd out of 24 finalists.

In 2014, he participated in the fifth season of Danse avec les stars – the French version of Dancing with the Stars. He was partnered with professional dancer Candice Pascal. On November 8, 2014, they were eliminated finishing 6th out of 11 contestants.

== Personal life ==
Corneille married Canadian model and actress Sofia de Medeiros in 2006; they now have two children.

== Discography ==
=== Albums ===
Studio albums

Year	Album	Charts				Certification
Year	Album	BEL Wa	FR	SWI	QUE	Certification
2002	Parce qu'on vient de loin	3	4	33		
2005	Les Marchands de rêves	6	3	34		
2007	The Birth of Corneillius	–	23	–		
2009	Sans titre	47	21	–		
2011	Les Inséparables	55	10	–		
2013	Entre nord et sud	–	46	–		
2019	Parce qu'on aime	–	58	–		
2022	Encre Rose	–	–	–		
"—" denotes a title that did not chart, or was not released in that territory.

Special editions

- 2003: Parce qu'on vient de loin (édition deluxe) (two discs)
- 2006: Parce qu'on vient de loin / Les marchands de rêves (double album rerelease)

Live albums and DVDs

Year	Album	Charts			Certification
Year	Album	BEL Wa	FR	SWI	Certification
2005	Live (double album)	10	9	–	

=== Singles ===
Year	Single	Peak position					Certification	Album
Year	Single	BEL Wa Ultratop	BEL Wa Ultratip*	FR	SWI	QUE	Certification	Album
2002	"Avec classe"	–	Tip 3	30	–			Parce qu'on vient de loin
2003	"Ensemble"	–	–	39	–			Parce qu'on vient de loin
2004	"Parce qu'on vient de loin"	9	–	10	33			Parce qu'on vient de loin
2004	"Seul au monde"	34	–	26	62			Parce qu'on vient de loin
2004	"Rêves de star"	–	–	–	–			Parce qu'on vient de loin
2004	"Comme un fils"	–	–	21	56			Parce qu'on vient de loin
2005	"Le bon Dieu est une femme"	–	–	–	–			Les marchands de rêves
2006	"Les marchands de rêves"	–	Tip 2	37	88			Les marchands de rêves
2009	"En attendant..."	–	Tip 19	–	–			Sans titre
2011	"Le jour après la fin du monde"	33	–	27	–			Les inséparables
2011	"Des pères, des hommes et des frères" (Corneille feat. La Fouine)	–	Tip 2	25	–			Les inséparables
2012	"Jusqu'au bout de nos peines" (Corneille feat. Soprano)	–	–	–	–			Les inséparables
2012	"Le bar des sentimentalistes"	–	–	–	–			Les inséparables
2013	"Les sommets de nos vies"	–	–	84	–			TBA
"—" denotes a title that did not chart, or was not released in that territory.

*Did not appear in the official Belgian Ultratop 50 charts, but rather in the bubbling under Ultratip charts.

=== As featured artist ===
Year	Single	Peak position			Certification	Album
Year	Single	BEL Wa Ultratop	BEL Wa Ultratip*	FR	Certification	Album
2011	"Le meilleur du monde" (TLF feat. Corneille)	–	Tip 38	28		TLF album Renaissance
2012	"Histoires vraies" (Youssoupha feat. Corneille)	–	–	82		Youssoupha album Noir desir
2012	"Co-Pilot" (French version) (Kristina Maria feat. Corneille)	–	Tip 1	33		Kristina Maria album Tell the World
2013	"Cœur de guerrier" (Big Ali feat. Youssoupha, Corneille & Acid)	–	Tip 6	–		
2013	"À l'horizon" (Kery James feat. Corneille)	–	Tip 31	–		Kery James album Dernier MC

*Did not appear in the official Belgian Ultratop 50 charts, but rather in the bubbling under Ultratip charts.

=== DVDs ===
- 2005: Live (coinciding with Live album)

== Awards ==
- 2005 NRJ Music Awards Video of the Year for Parce qu'on vient de loin
- 2005 EBBA Award.
