= Parce qu'on vient de loin =

Studio album by Corneille
- Released: 2002
- Recorded: 2002
- Label: Wagram Music

Corneille chronology
Parce qu'on vient de loin (2002)	Parce qu'on vient de loin (édition deluxe) (2003)

Parce qu'on vient de loin is the debut album released by Corneille at the end of 2002. It reached #4 in the French Albums Chart staying a total of 99 weeks in the chart.

In 2006, the album was rereleased as a package Parce qu'on vient de loin / Les marchands de rêves with the follow-up album of Corneille Les marchands de rêves

== Track list ==
1. "Seul au monde"
2. "Terre"
3. "Sans rancune"
4. "Ca m'va"
5. "Rêves de star"
6. "Avec classe"
7. "Parce qu'on vient de loin"
8. "On regarde"
9. "Tout va bien"
10. "Ensemble"
11. "Toi"
12. "Va (On se verra)"
13. "Qu'est-ce que tu fais?"
14. "Comme un fils"
15. "Parce qu'on vient de loin" (version acoustique)
16. "D'amour ou d'amitié"

== 2003: Deluxe Edition ==
Parce qu'on vient de loin (édition deluxe)

Studio album by Corneille
- Released: 2003
- Recorded: 2002–2003
- Label: Wagram Music

Corneille chronology
Parce qu'on vient de loin (2002)	Parce qu'on vient de loin (édition deluxe) (2003)	Les marchands de rêves (2005)

After the success of the album in Canada, the following year a Deluxe edition (édition deluxe) was released including additional recordings.

== Track list ==
Disc 1

1. "Seul au monde"
2. "Terre"
3. "Sans rancune"
4. "Ca me va"
5. "Rêves de star"
6. "Avec classe"
7. "Parce qu'on vient de loin"
8. "On regarde"
9. "Tout va bien"
10. "Ensemble"
11. "Toi"
12. "Va (On se verra)"
13. "Qu'est-ce que tu fais?"
14. "Comme un fils"
15. "Laissez-nous vivre"
16. "Avec classe" (version acoustique)

Disc 2

1. "Sans rancune" (version acoustique)
2. "Parce qu'on vient de loin" (version acoustique)
3. "Seul au monde" (version acoustique)
4. "Rêves de star" (version acoustique)
5. "Qu'est-ce que tu fais?" (version acoustique)

Video bonus

- Clip "Avec Classe"
- Clip "Ensemble"
- Clip "Rêves de star"
- Making of "Rêves de star"
