= Sans titre (album) =

Studio album by Corneille
- Released: 2009
- Recorded: 2009
- Genre: Soul, R&B

Corneille chronology
The Birth of Corneillius (2007)	Sans titre (2009)	Les inséparables (2011)

Sans titre is the 2009 studio album of Corneille. It was released in 2009 reaching #21 on the French Albums Chart and staying for 10 weeks in the chart.

== Track listing ==
1. "Elle me ment"
2. "En attendant"
3. "Sans nous"
4. "Ma comédie"
5. "Le Parasite"
6. "Pauvre cynique"
7. "Voleuse de lendemain"
8. "Star! Vite fait!"
9. "Vieillir avec toi"
10. "Je me pardonne"
