= Live (Corneille album) =

Live album by Corneille
- Released: 2005
- Recorded: 2005
- Genre: R&B

Live is a live double album of Corneille, that was released in 2005 and reached #9 in the French Albums Chart, staying 35 weeks in the chart.

== Track listing ==
Disc 1

1. "Redemption Song" (Bob Marley & The Wailers)
2. "Terre"
3. "Sans rancune"
4. "Laissez-nous vivre"
5. "Toi"
6. "On regarde"
7. "Seul au monde"
8. "Roxanne" (The Police)
9. "Ça me va"
10. "Rêves de star"
11. "Avec classe"
12. "Va (on se verra)"
13. "Tout va bien"
14. "Parce qu'on vient de loin"

Disc 2

1. "Comme un fils"
2. "Qu'est-ce que tu te fais?"
3. "Overjoyed" (Stevie Wonder)
4. "Sexual Healing / Let's Get It On" (Marvin Gaye)
5. "Ensemble"
