= Les Inséparables =

Studio album by Corneille
- Released: 2011
- Recorded: 2011

Corneille chronology
Sans titre (2009)	Les Inséparables (2011)

Les Inséparables is a studio album by Corneille released on 24 October 2011. The album reached #10 on the French Albums Chart, and #75 on the Canadian Albums Chart.

== Track list ==
1. "L'Espoir en stéréo"
2. "Le jour après la fin du monde"
3. "Des pères, des hommes et des frères" (feat La Fouine)
4. "Les Simples Choses"
5. "Quand Paris t'appelle"
6. "Rome"
7. "Les Inséparables"
8. "Dis-moi que tu m'aimes"
9. "Au bout de nos peines" (feat Soprano)
10. "Le Bar des sentimentalistes"
11. "Mâle de cœur"
12. "Tous les deux"
13. "Tout ce que tu pourras"
14. "Le Meilleur du monde" (feat TLF)
