= The Birth of Cornelius =

Studio album by Corneille
- Released: 2007
- Recorded: 2007
- Label: Wagram Music (2007); Universal (2009)

Corneille chronology
Les marchands de rêves (2005)	The Birth of Cornelius (2007)	Sans titre (2009)

The Birth of Cornelius is a 2007 studio album by Corneille released in 2007. It was an English language album in contrast to earlier Corneille albums in French language. It reached #23 in the French Albums Chart staying for 14 weeks in the chart. The album received a generally mixed reception from fans and critics.

== Track list (2007) ==
The original album was released by Wagram Music and included the following songs

1. "Back to Life" (4:32)
2. "Love Is Good" (3:24)
3. "Too Much of Everything" (3:43)
4. "I Never Loved You" (3:53)
5. "Murder" (4:04)
6. "Spending On You" (3:58)
7. "Sweet Dependency" (4:36)
8. "Home Is By You" (5:41)
9. "I'll Never Call You Home Again" (3:47)
10. "A Man of This World" (4:26)
11. "The One" (4:30)
12. "Heaven" (5:15)

== Track list (2009) ==
In 2009, Universal Music released the album under the same title, including some new materials and omission of some tracks found on the original Wagram release

1. "Back to Life" (4:34)
2. "All of My Love" (3:03)
3. "Liberation" (3:35)
4. "A Man of This World" (4:32)
5. "Murder" (4:09)
6. "Foolish Heart" (5:27)
7. "Too Much of Everything" (3:48)
8. "Home Is By You" (5:43)
9. "I'll Never Call You Home Again" (3:48)
10. "Sweet Dependency" (4:38)
11. "Heaven" (5:13)
