= Pierre Gage =

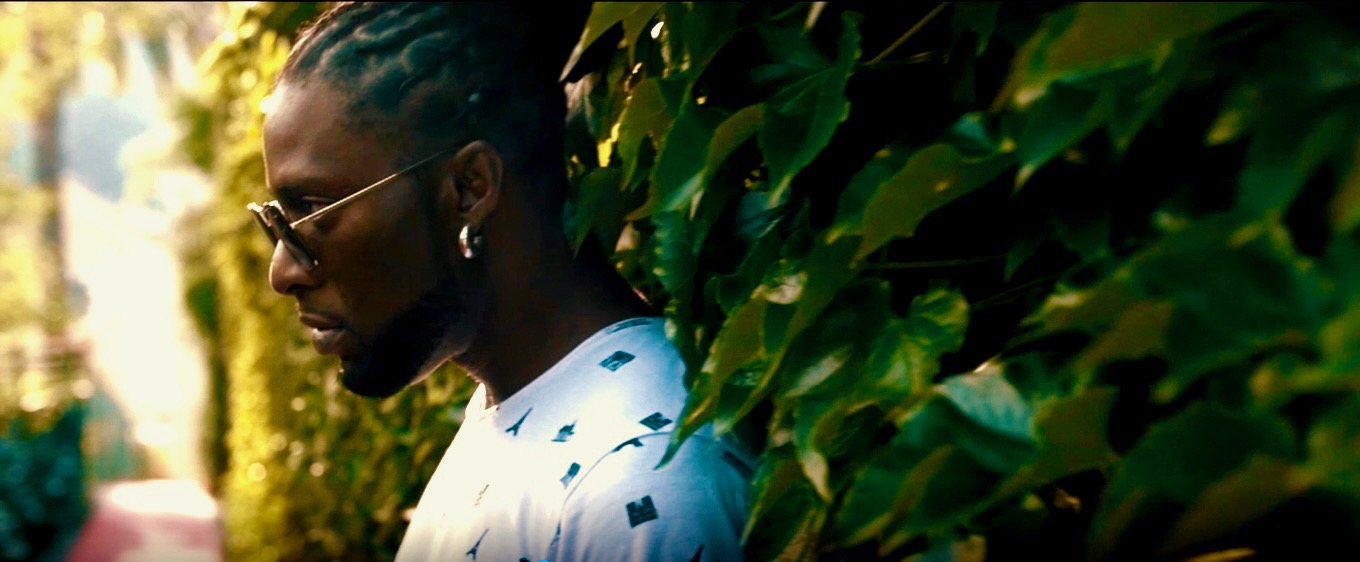

Background information
- Born: 3 January 1977 (age 49); Montreal, Quebec, Canada
- Occupations: Singer, songwriter
- Website: www.gage.mu

Pierre Gage (born 3 January 1977 in Montreal, Quebec), known by his last name Gage, is a Québécois singer and songwriter.

== Biography ==
Born in Montreal, Quebec, Gage is of Haitian and Jamaican descent. Gage got his start in the music business while still attending high school by landing the role of Johny Roquefort after attending an audition for the rock opera Starmania. Thus began his career as a musician heavily influenced by Bob Marley, Stevie Wonder, Marvin Gaye and Lauryn Hill; influences partly explained by Gage's Jamaican and Haitian roots.

The pivotal moment in Gage's career came when he met Corneille and Gardy Martin with whom he started the group R'n'B O.N.E. Thanks to Corneille's writing and composing talents, O.N.E.'s single "Zoukin" reached number one on the Canadian radio airplay chart. The group then went on tour, opening for acts such as Isabelle Boulay and Kelis.

In January 2001, three years after the formation of O.N.E, Corneille left the group to pursue a solo career. Gage followed the same path, at first concentrating on acting and theatre before returning to music.

Corneille and Gage maintained a working relationship, with Gage opening for Corneille during Corneille's 2003 tour. Gage began to have success on his own thanks to his single "Trop Fresh", which attracted a significant fan base.

Gage's first album Soul Rebel, of which most of the songs were written, composed, and produced by Corneille, came out in July 2005. The album contains a mix of soul and reggae music. It charted in France at number 7, and was listed by SNEP at number 88 of the top albums of 2005. In 2008 Gage released second album Changer le Monde, a mix of soul music, dancehall and reggae, which spent 15 weeks on the French album chart peaking at number 18.

In February 2019, Gage participated in The Voice 8 in France. He was invited to join Mika's team following his appearance in the televised singing competition.

== Discography ==
=== Albums ===
- 2005: Soul Rebel
1. Pense à moi
2. Le départ
3. Dis moi
4. Te quiero
5. Viens me voir
6. L’homme d’une femme
7. Demain
8. Je t’aime quand même
9. Trop fresh
10. Ce soir
11. N’arrête pas
12. Viens me voir (acoustique)
- 2008: Changer le monde
1. Changer le monde
2. Un jour à la foi
3. Dimanche
4. Pardonne-moi
5. Doudou
6. Tu peux choisir (feat Vitaa)
7. Mon frère
8. T'étais où ?
9. Ailleurs
10. J'envoie un SOS
11. Sous les étoiles
12. Je veux être libre
13. Doudou Remix

=== Singles ===
- February 2005: Trop Fresh
- September 2005 : Pense à moi
- March 2006 : Je t’aime quand même
