= Candice Parise =

French actress and singer

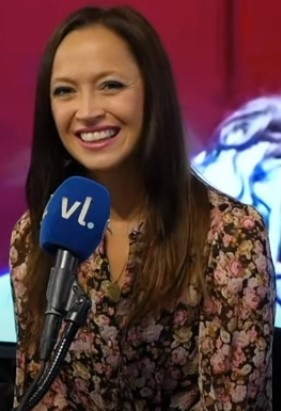
- Candice Parise (2022)
- Born: France
- Occupations: actress, singer

Candice Parise is a French actress and singer.

== Biography ==
Candice Parise studied acting in an American school in Paris, singing at CIM Jazz school and dancing at School Rick Odums.

In 2006, she represented Paris/Île-de-France/Centre at the French Eurovision Song Contest and finished in the last five candidates.

She created her own jazz band called the Parise' Jazz Quintet and also became the lead singer of the Rive Droite Rive Gauche jazz band with which she edited two albums and won several awards at the Megève Jazz Festival.

In 2009, Candice joined the London School of Musical Theatre. Since her graduation, she has played in several musicals in Europe and Asia in French and English: Hair, Notre-Dame de Paris, Les Misérables, Songs for a New World

== Musicals ==
- 2003 : West Side Story by Leonard Bernstein and Stephen Sondheim, dir Ron Schaeffer – French Woods Festival of the Performing Arts, Hancock, New York
- 2003 : On passe dans trois jours by Sacha Guitry, dir J.Léonhardt – Rocquencourt : Fanny Talmont
- 2004 : Promesses, Creation Ondines/Teixeira – Versailles
- 2004 : 8 Women from François Ozon's movie by E. Favre – Versailles : Augustine
- 2004 : This fate's whore by J.Amara Ross – Paris
- 2010 : Mr Christmas by Charles Miller and Kevin Hammonds – UK Premiere
- 2010 : City of Angels by Cy Coleman and David Zippel, dir Graham Hubbard – London : Priscilla
- 2010 : Les Misérables by Claude-Michel Schönberg and Alain Boublil, dir Adrian Sarple – London : Fantine
- 2010–2011 : Hair by Galt MacDermot, Gerome Ragni and James Rado, dir Sylvain Meyniac – Paris, tour : Crissy
- 2011–2012 : Notre-Dame de Paris by Richard Cocciante and Luc Plamondon, dir Gilles Maheu – China, Korea : Esmeralda
- 2012–2013 : Roméo et Juliette by and dir Gérard Presgurvic – Japan, China : Juliette
- 2013–2014 : Songs for a New World by Jason Robert Brown, dir Frédérique Lelaure – Paris : Woman 1
- 2014–2015 : Piano-Plage, dir Nathalie Stas – Paris, Belgium : Mi
- 2014–2015 : The Wizard of Oz, by Andrew Lloyd Webber, dir Jeremy Sams – Palais des Congrès de Paris, tour : Dorothy
- 2015–2016 : Holiday on Ice (BELIEVE), – Zénith Paris, tour : Clarissa Official Lead Singer
- 2016–2017 : The Voice 6 France, Team: Florent Pagny

== Discography ==
=== Albums ===
- 2011 : La Belle vie by Rive Droite Rive Gauche Swing Band
- 2013 : Swingin from Paris to Chicago by Rive Droite Rive Gauche Swing Band

== Awards ==
- Megève Jazz Contest 2009 : People's choice with the band Rive Droite Rive Gauche
- Megève Jazz Contest 2011 : People's choice with the band Rive Droite Rive Gauche
- Megève Jazz Contest 2013 : People's choice with the band Rive Droite Rive Gauche
