= Cindy Bruna =

French fashion model and actrice (born 1994)

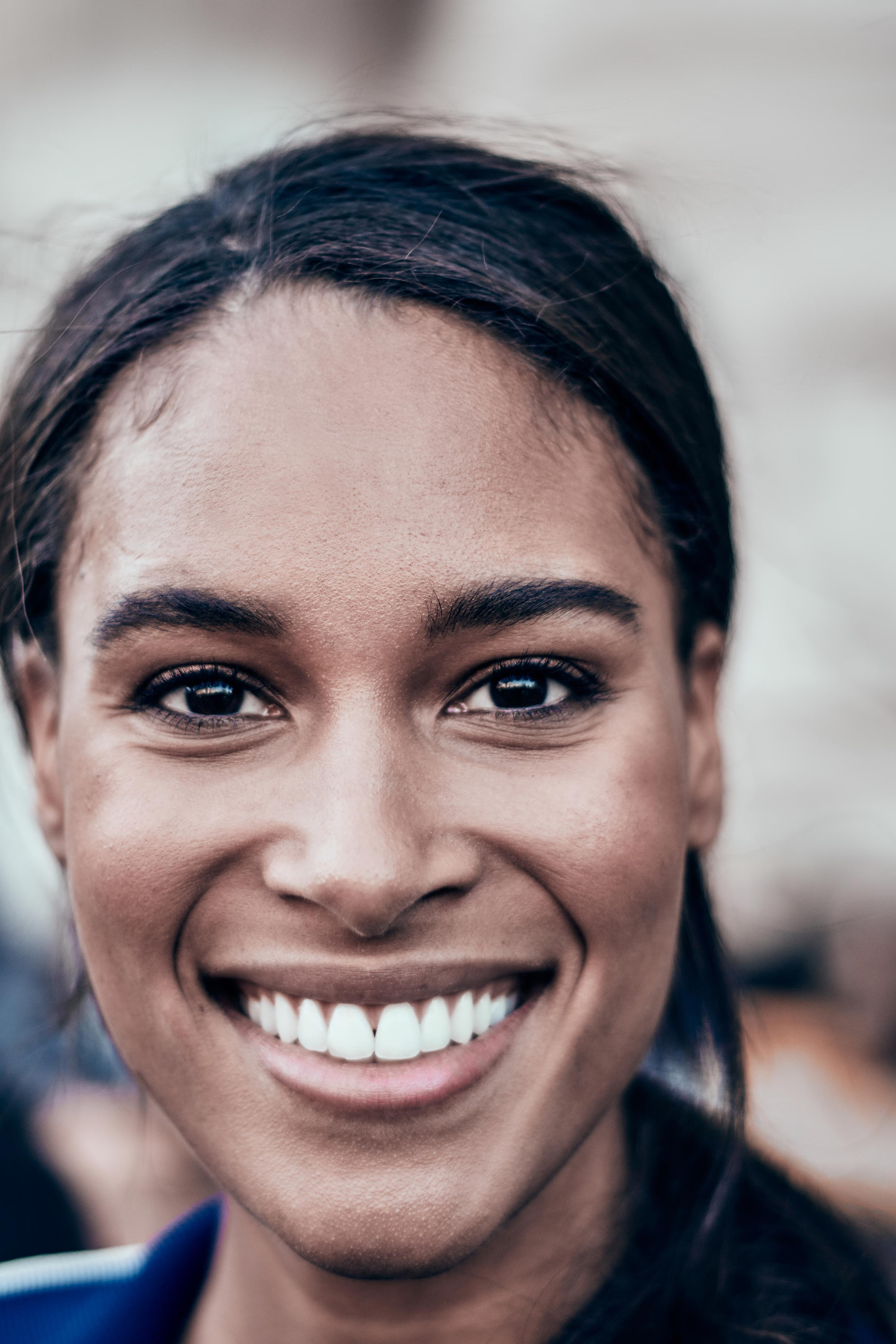
- Bruna in 2019
- Born: 27 September 1994 (age 31); Saint-Raphaël, Var, PACA, France
- Occupation: Model
- Spouse: Blondy Baruti (m. 2025)
- Modeling information
- Height: 1.82 m (5 ft 11 1/2 in)
- Hair color: Brown
- Eye color: Brown
- Agency: The Society Management (New York); Special Management (Milan); Storm Management (London); Uno Models (Barcelona); East West Models (Frankfurt); Metropolitan / M Management (Paris) (mother agency)

Cindy Bruna (born 27 September 1994) is a French fashion model.

== Early life ==
Bruna was born in Saint-Raphaël, Var, France on 27 September 1994 to an Italian father, Stefano Bruna, and a Congolese mother, Eléonore, from Brazzaville, Congo. She has an older sister named Christy. At age 16, she was noticed by Dominique Savri, an agent and scout for Metropolitan Management, who suggested she go to Paris for a photo shoot. Bruna was hesitant, because she wanted to become a chartered accountant, and her mother didn't want her to miss school. Eventually, she accepted the offer and learned the basics of modelling. Since graduating from school, she now divides her time between Paris and New York City.

== Career ==
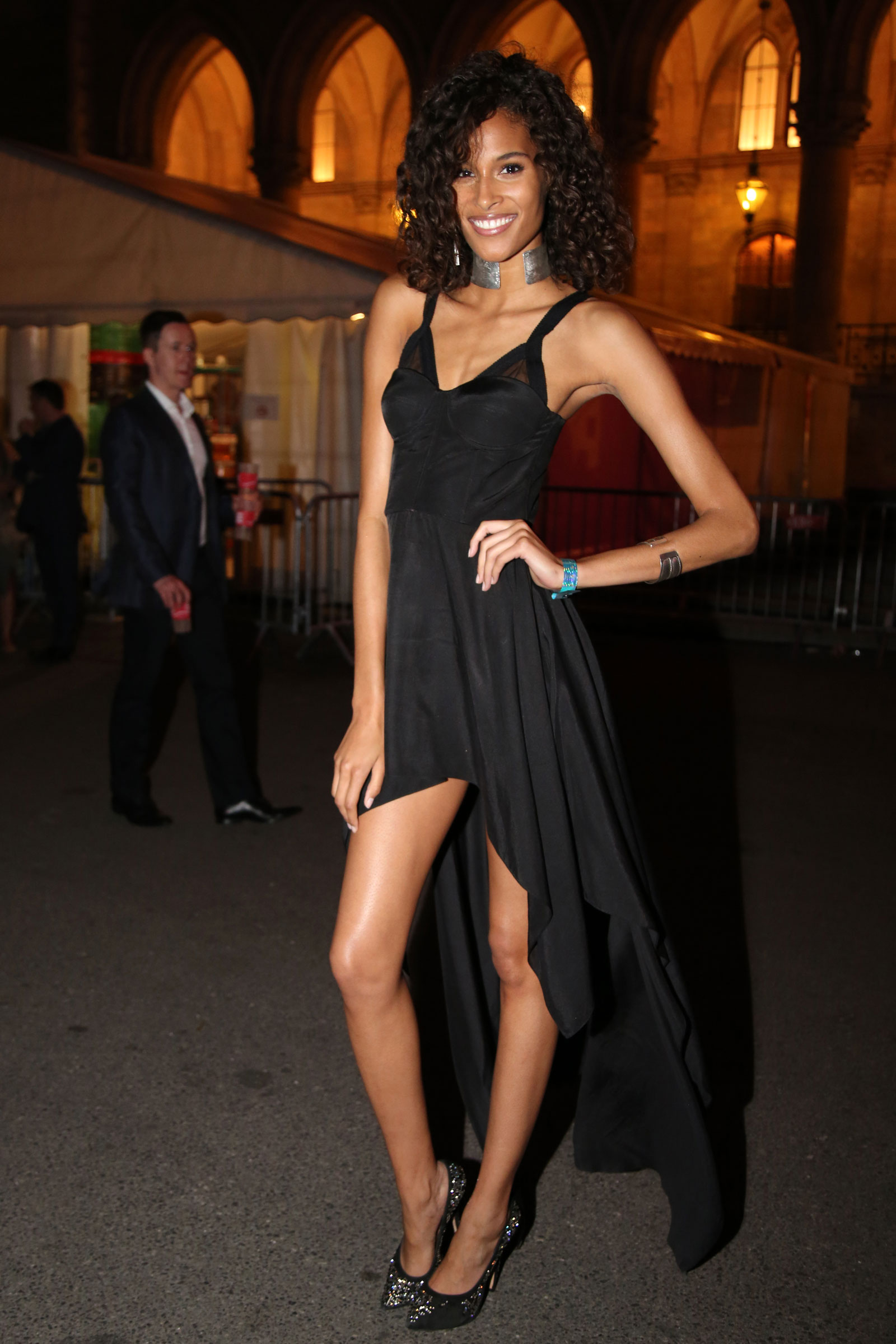
Bruna in 2015

After signing with Metropolitan Management, her mother agency, and Wilhelmina Models, she landed her first modeling jobs, which were for Alaïa and Elie Saab. In 2012, she walked exclusively for Calvin Klein. She also landed on the cover of Vogue Italia's December 2013 and September 2014 issues. She has also appeared in editorials for American Vogue, Vogue Arabia, Vogue Japan, Vogue Spain, Vogue Ukraine, Vogue Portugal, W, Harper's Bazaar, Elle UK, Wonderland, and others.

She walked the 2013 Victoria's Secret Fashion Show for the first time and has appeared in every subsequent show. She has starred in campaigns for Prada, Burberry, Chanel, Michael Kors, L'Oreal, Yves Saint Laurent, Ralph Lauren, H&M, etc. In the S/S 2014 season, she walked for opened for Roland Mouret and Temperley London; she also walked for designers like Giambattista Valli, Bottega Veneta, Jean-Paul Gaultier, Givenchy, Balmain, Alexander McQueen, Antonio Berardi, Armani, Moschino, Philipp Plein, Anthony Vaccarello, and Zuhair Murad.

Bruna currently ranks as a "Money Girl" on models.com and has also been included on the Forbes "30 under 30" list. She is an ambassador of Solidarité Femmes, a women's support network that helps victims of domestic violence.

In April 2020, L'Oreal named Bruna as international spokesperson for the brand.

== Personal life ==
In December 2025, Bruna married a Congolese basketball player, Blondy Baruti, at the Notre-Dame des Ardentes after getting engaged the year before. The couple held both a civil and a religious ceremony. Bruna publicly shared on Instagram that she had chosen to remain abstinent until marriage.
