= Going for Gold =

British television game show (1987–2009)

- Genre: Game show
- Presented by: Henry Kelly (1987–1996); John Suchet (2008–2009); Dean Wilson (2008–2009: stand-in)
- Starring: Alex Kramer (2008–2009); Vicki Letch (2008–2009: stand-in)
- Voices of: Martin Buchanan
- Theme music composer: Sandy McClelland; Hans Zimmer
- Country of origin: United Kingdom
- Original language: English
- No. of series: 10 (BBC1); 1 (Channel 5)
- No. of episodes: 702 (BBC1); 105 (Channel 5)

Production
- Production locations: BBC Television Centre (1987–1988); BBC Elstree Centre (1988–1992); New Broadcasting House (1993–1996)
- Running time: 25 minutes (BBC1); 60 minutes (inc. adverts: Channel 5)
- Production companies: Reg Grundy Productions (1987–1996); Talkback Thames (2008–2009)

Original release
- Network: BBC1
- Release: 12 October 1987 – 9 July 1996
- Network: Channel 5
- Release: 13 October 2008 – 20 March 2009

Going for Gold is a British television game show that originally aired on BBC1 between 12 October 1987 and 9 July 1996. It was revived for Channel 5 from 13 October 2008 to 20 March 2009.

== Background ==
=== 1987–96 ===
Going for Gold was originally broadcast on BBC1 from 12 October 1987 to 9 July 1996, usually, after the lunchtime broadcast of Australian soap opera Neighbours. It was presented by Irish broadcaster Henry Kelly, and its defining concept was that it featured contestants from different European countries who competed against each other to answer questions (all in English) to win a prize. The show's theme tune was composed by future multi-award winning composer Hans Zimmer.

The show was also aired on Super Channel (later NBC Super Channel) in Continental Europe and on BBC TV Europe (which carried a mix of BBC1 and BBC2 output up to its dissolution in early 1991).

The 1987–1996 run had seven contestants each week, each representing a different European country (the four countries of the United Kingdom, as well as Jersey and the Isle of Man, fielded their own contestants) who competed against each other for a place in the finals. The show followed a repechage format, whereby unsuccessful contestants from Monday's show would return on Tuesday, and so on throughout the week. Each episode lasted for 25 minutes, including four rounds.

There were ten series in total (two in 1992). The first five series were broadcast during the winter, and many of these were split in half by the Christmas break. The second 1992 and 1993 series went out in the autumn, and the last three were broadcast during the summer. The 1996 series featured competitors from the United Kingdom only and was moved to an earlier time slot, immediately before the 1.00 pm news.

=== 2008–09 ===
The show was revived and produced by Talkback Thames and aired on Channel 5, premiering from 13 October to 19 December 2008. The new version featured only contestants from the UK and Ireland, was broadcast live and hosted by newsreader John Suchet. Former ITV Play host Alex Kramer, did the newly introduced viewers' phone-in question section from 17 November 2008 until 20 March 2009, repeating the questions several times and talking to the selected phone-in contestant. The set questions involve many clues to an item or person, and the phone-ins were notorious for taking up significant amounts of time during the show.

The show continued its run between 5 January and 20 March 2009. Vicky Letch temporarily replaced Alex Kramer as the viewer's phone-in host whilst Alex was on holiday. When John Suchet was unavailable, the programme was hosted by Dean Wilson. Dean Wilson was replaced for 3 episodes by Soldier, Soldier actor Alex Leam.

At the end of the series, the sixteen winners with the most daily wins contested four semi-finals, the winners of which competed in the series final on 20 March 2009, won by Iwan Thomas.

== Format ==
=== Elimination round (Round 1) ===
Each edition began with a short general knowledge round to all seven contestants. Out of the contestants who started the show, four would go through to the next round (always referred to as the "first round proper" by Kelly). These four would be the first who managed to answer each of the four general knowledge questions correctly. These questions would usually take the form of a 20 to 30-second description of an object, person, animal or place (usually beginning "Who am I?", "What am I?", etc.), with progressively more details being revealed by Kelly until someone was able to identify it. By the Thursday show, there would be only four contestants left to play the opening round and so several questions were asked and the first person to two points would join the previous days' winners in "the first round proper".

This round was not played in the 2008 version.

=== Beat the Buzzer (Round 2) ===
The Beat the Buzzer round was a general knowledge round, played with hands on plungers. Questions were worth one, two or three points. Beginning with a general knowledge question worth one point, a contestant who gave a correct answer would be told the subject of the next question, and got to choose the value to play for. If nobody answered correctly, it restarted with another general knowledge question worth one point. The first three players to reach six points (or nine in the 2008 version) went on to play the next round.

If a contestant buzzed in and got a question wrong, the question would be offered to other contestants, signalled by a buzzer sounding. However, if a contestant buzzed in and gave no answer at all it would result in a doorbell sound and the answer was revealed.

=== Four in a Row (Round 3) ===
In this round, each of the remaining contestants were asked to pick a category (out of a choice of four). The order in which they picked the categories was based on the order in which they progressed from the previous round. Each would then have to answer questions on their chosen category for 40 seconds.

Players scored based on the number of consecutive questions they got right – if an incorrect answer was given, their score returned to zero. If they gave four correct answers consecutively then the timer stopped and the game ended. If the time ran out, the score taken from this round was the highest point reached over 40 seconds. After this round, the two highest scoring players went through to the final round. A "first to two" general knowledge playoff was held if there was a tie, using the same style of questions from round 1.

=== Head to Head (Round 4) ===
In the final, every question was worth between four (five on ‘’One to Win’’ and on the Channel 5 revival) and one points depending on how quickly they were answered. Again, the questions pertained to a famous person, place, thing, fictional character or event. A graphic of a timer was shown in the middle of the viewers' screen which showed the four (or five) time zones in which a player could buzz in. The time zones (4,3,2,1) were split between each player, whose buzzer only worked when their allocated time zone was in play. If a player gave an incorrect answer, their section of the time was passed over to their opponent and the time (and the question) continued; in the event that a contestant was passed control of a zone and also gave an incorrect answer in the same segment of time, then the next lower segment was also passed over to their opponent. On the first question, the highest scoring contestant from the previous round got to decide whether to "play or pass" - determining who would have control of the time zones. Thereafter, the contestant that was trailing behind (referred to by Kelly as "playing catch-up") would have control over whether to "play or pass" on each question. If the scores were tied before a question, the highest scoring contestant from the previous round had control on the "play or pass" decision. In the original series, after the category of the question was given, a clue to the answer would be displayed on the screen for the viewers at home.

In the original, the first player to score nine points won the game and a prize. On the 2008 revival, this round kept on playing until time was up. When time was up, the player with the most points won £1,000 and competed against three new players on the next programme.

== Progression to the finals ==
The first player to reach nine points in this round won the daily game and went through to the end of week final (an automatic place in the 'first round proper' on Thursday), from where, the winner progressed to the later stages of the series. The losing players all came back the next day, starting with the same pool of players each weekday, minus the winner of the week's earlier shows. The weekly final had the four daily winners directly through to Beat the Buzzer with the final spot decided in the Elimination Round where the first to answer two questions correctly progressed. The winner of the weekly final went through to one of two Semi-Final weeks.

The Semi-Final weeks occurred at the end of each half of the season with between 7–10 weekly winners (depending upon season length). Each week was made up of four daily heats with the winner of each heat going through to Finals week and the losing players returning each day (there was no weekly final). By this point the contestants were buzzing in noticeably earlier as the standard of competition increased.

The Finals week consisted of eight winners from the Semi-Finals (four from each week) competing in a standard week format of three daily heats with the winners advancing to the Grand Final (directly to the Beat the Buzzer round). The Grand Final episode would start with a "First-to-Two" Elimination Round amongst the remaining five contestants and play as normal to the Head to Head where the winner would receive the star prize holiday (as described in every episode) and the runner-up would get a consolation prize (e.g. a colour television, or a gold-plated Going for Gold plate).

The 2008 revival added a Finals week inviting back sixteen contestants from the series (all winners of the international special episodes and contestants with the most daily wins). This week consisted of four daily heats with the winners earning £1,000 and advancing to the Grand Final episode where that week's prize money was rolled up to award £5,000 to the champion. All shows ran using the normal format for that series.

== Transmissions ==
=== BBC1 ===
Series	Start date	End date	Episodes
1	12 October 1987	31 March 1988	92
2	17 October 1988	23 March 1989	84
3	6 November 1989	22 March 1990	68
4	5 November 1990	22 March 1991	68
5	4 November 1991	18 March 1992	60
6	7 September 1992	18 December 1992	60
7	26 July 1993	12 November 1993	75
8	25 April 1994	25 August 1994	60
9	27 February 1995	5 July 1995	75
10	1 April 1996	9 July 1996	60

=== Channel 5 ===
Series	Start date	End date	Episodes
1	13 October 2008	20 March 2009	105

=== International Broadcast ===
On 6 July 2026, episodes of this series began airing on American digital channel Buzzr as part of a promotional mini-marathon dubbed "Games Go Global" which also featured episodes of Small Talk hosted by Ronnie Corbett and Family Feud Canada hosted by Gerry Dee.

== International versions ==
Going for Gold began its life as an American pilot, Run for the Money, hosted by Bill Rafferty and produced for ABC in 1987, at ABC Television Center. The pilot did not sell in the States; however, Grundy took it to Europe where it became what is now Going for Gold. Run for the Money would have been played with four contestants (one a returning champion) starting with the Beat the Buzzer round. The winner of each episode received $5,000, and any contestant who won five consecutive games retired undefeated and had their winnings increased to $50,000. Another American pilot was called American Know-it-All, hosted by Neil Patrick Harris in 2007. This version featured two groups of four contestants playing separate games which started with the Beat the Buzzer round; the winner of each game would bank $10,000 and face each other in a "Super Know-it-All Question" working the same way as in the Elimination round. The victor of this question would earn the right to play for $1,000,000 by answering questions with a decreasing number of clues.

The programme has been adapted in France, where it became a very famous game show Questions pour un champion ("Questions for a Champion"), which still airs today on France 3, is hosted by Samuel Étienne since February 2016, replacing long-time fixture Julien Lepers (November 1988 – February 2016). additionally, Lepers was briefly subtittuted by Vincent Perrot (January 14 - 28 1994). The series also had a spinoff called Questions pour un Super Champion (Questions for a Super Champion) also hosted by Étienne, which aired from 10 September 2006 until 24 August 2024.

The Channel 5 quiz One to Win was a half-hour show whose format was effectively based on the latter three rounds of Going for Gold, repackaged and with a different host (initially, Paul Roseby, who was soon replaced by Robin Houston, known as the 'voice of the computer' on another Channel 5 quiz show, 100%). Unlike Going for Gold but like 100%, One to Win featured low cash prizes for the first player to reach 21 points in the head-to-head round – just £200 per episode – but offered its champions the option to return on the next edition of the show on a quest to win as much as £5,000. In September, a “sports challenge” week featured four semifinal heats, each awarding £200 and a commemorative coin set to the winner, and a berth in the Friday final which awarded £1,000 to the winner.

Country	Name	Presenter	Channel	Date of transmission
Arab League	أنا الأول; Anna Al Awwal	Ayman Zeidan	beIN Drama	2019–2020
Austria	Quiz Champion	Klaus Eberhartinger	ATV	8 May 2007 – 30 May 2007
France	Questions pour un Champion	Julien Lepers (7 November 1988 – 20 February 2016); Vincent Perrot (14 – 28 January 1994); Samuel Étienne (22 February 2016 – present)	FR3 (1988–1992); France 3 (1992–present)	7 November 1988 – present
France	Questions pour un Super Champion	Samuel Étienne	FR3 (1988–1992); France 3 (1992–present)	10 September 2006 – 24 August 2024
Serbia	Питања за шампиона Pitanja za šampiona	Ilija Kovacić	B92	10 April 2006 – 21 July 2009
Turkey	Bilir Bilmez	Hüseyin Köroğlu	TRT 1	1996
Ukraine	Питання для чемпіонів Pytannya dlya chempioniv	Yury Gorbunov	STB	29 August 2005 – 2 December 2005
United States	Run for the Money	Bill Rafferty	ABC	1987 (Non-Broadcast pilot)
United States	American Know-it-All	Neil Patrick Harris	?	30 December 2007 (Non-Broadcast pilot)
