= Camille Lou =

French singer and actress (born 1992)

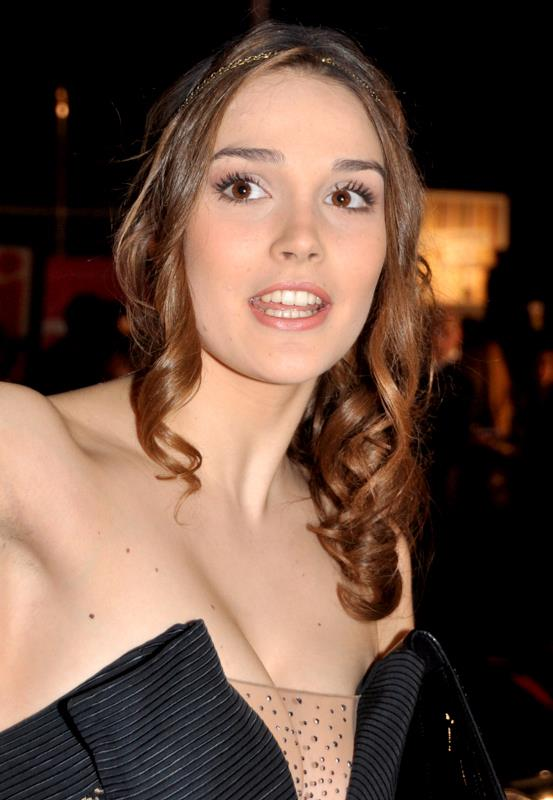
- Lou at the 2013 NRJ Music Awards

Background information
- Born: Camille Houssière; 22 May 1992 (age 34); Maubeuge, Nord, France
- Genres: Pop rock; pop folk; musical; chanson française; pop
- Occupations: singer, actress
- Years active: 2010–present

Camille Houssière (born 22 May 1992), known professionally as Camille Lou, is a French singer and actress. She is known for her roles in musicals, including 1789: Les Amants de la Bastille in the role of Olympe, and La Légende du roi Arthur in the role of Reine Guenièvre, and for the role of Tam Chamade in the TF1 series Cat's Eyes.

== Early life ==
Camille Lou was born 22 May 1992 in Maubeuge. Her father was a singer and guitarist for a band named Paradoxe, thus she and her two older sisters were exposed to music at a young age, each later learning to play an instrument. Camille played the violin. At the age of twelve, she won a local singing competition, les Voix de Noël ("Christmas voices"), in Hautmont. She attended lycée Notre-Dame de Grâce in Maubeuge. After having obtained her baccalaureate she attended the University of Valenciennes to study law.

== Solo career ==
In January 2010, with the help of her guitar teacher at the time, Camille began her solo career under the pseudonym Jimmie. She began to sing and completed her first album La Grande Aventure, in pop-folk style. She made many appearances under her pseudonym, notably for her work on Cœur de Pirate's album in March 2010.

On 15 September 2017, she released the single "Self Control".

== Musicals ==
Being friends with fellow singers Nuno Resende and Merwan Rim, she was encouraged by the latter to sing in front of Dove Attia, a musical producer with whom Resende and Rim had both worked on Mozart, l'opéra rock. While attending a Parisian restaurant one evening, Camille and her family by chance were there at the same time as musical producer Dove Attia and singers from Mozart, l'opéra rock. Camille was encouraged by Rim to sing Falling Slowly from the film Once in front of Attia. Despite Camille having little prior experience in musical theatre, Attia was impressed and invited Camille to audition for his next musical. She sang a collection of songs from Mozart, l'opéra rock among others and finally in 2011, she won the role of Olympe, servant of Marie Antoinette in the musical 1789: Les Amants de la Bastille. Camille starred in the role for two runs of the show at the Palais des Sports in Paris as well as the 2012 tour around the country.

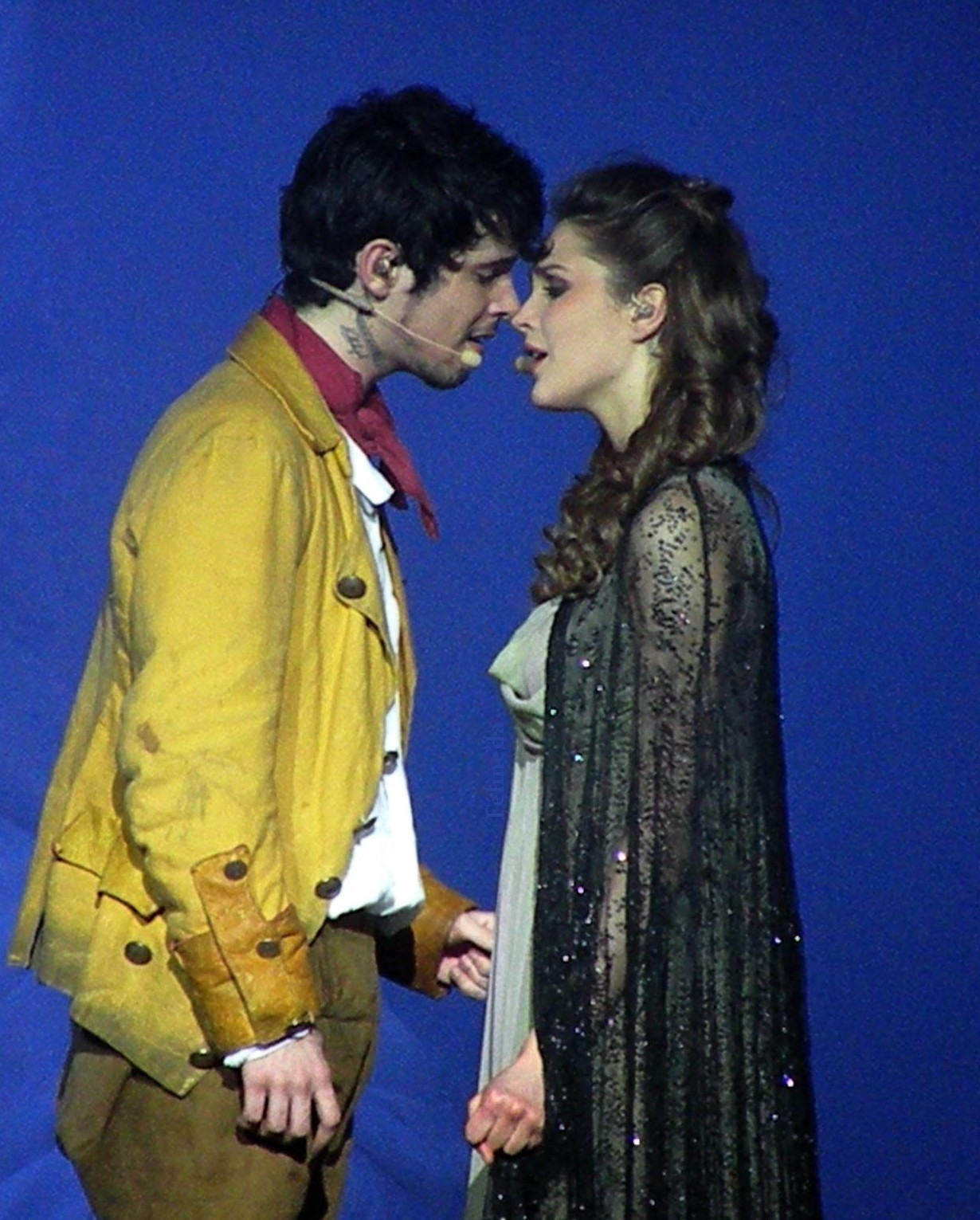
Camille Lou with Louis Delort in 1789: Les Amants de la Bastille

In 2014, Dove Attia proposed the role of Guenièvre (Guinivere) to Camille in his new musical, La Légende du roi Arthur, also featuring Florent Mothe's Arthur and Zaho's Morgane (Morgana). The musical was first performed on 17 September 2015 at Palais des congrès de Paris and toured France in 2016. Camille appears in her role in music videos for "Mon combat (Tir Nam Beo)", "Quelque chose de magique", and "Auprès d'un autre" (the latter also features peeks at the activity behind the scenes).

== Other projects ==
In December 2014, she recorded a song for the album We Love Disney with Garou, a cover of the song "Beauty and the Beast" from the Disney film of the same name.

She participated in the album Forever Gentlemen Volume 2, singing a cover of "La soleil de ma vie" with Amir.

She was also featured in a photoshoot for Tara Jarmon.

Following 1789: Les Amants de la Bastille, she became dedicated to her solo projects but also equally to her band composed of five singers that performed in Les Chansons d'abord at the side of Natasha St-Pier, broadcast each Sunday at 5 pm on France 3.

Camille was cast as Hélène Barignet in Emmanuel Fricero's film Marché noir.

In 2016, she took part in season 7 of the French version of Dancing with the Stars partnered with Grégoire Lyonnet, finishing in second place.

== Danse avec les stars ==
In 2016, she participated in the seventh season of Danse avec les stars – the French version of Dancing with the Stars. She was partnered with professional dancer Grégoire Lyonnet. On 16 December 2016, during the final, they finished runners-up to Laurent Maistret and his partner Denitsa Ikonomova by getting 46% of the votes.

In week 3, the public give a note to each couple.

Week	Dancing style	Music	Judge points				Total	Ranking	Result
Week	Dancing style	Music	Fauve Hautot	Jean-Marc Généreux	Marie-Claude Pietragalla	Chris Marques	Total	Ranking	Result
1	Rumba	Purple Rain - Prince Ft The Revolution	8	7	8	8	31/40	2=/11	No eliminations
2	Samba	Bootylicious - Destiny's Child	7	5	8	8	28/40	7=/11	Safe
1 + 2	Samba	Bootylicious - Destiny's Child	7	5	8	8	59/80	5/11	Safe
3	Contemporary dance (+9/10)	Iron - Woodkid	9	7	8	8	41/50	2/10	Safe
4	Charleston Cha-Cha-Cha Relay (+40 Points)	I Got a Woman - Ray Charles (Remix Rudedog) Medley - Boney M	10 + 8	9 + 8	10 + 8	8 + 7	108/125	2/9	Safe
5	Tango	Santa María (Del Buen Ayre) - Gotan Project	N/A	9 + 8	10 + 9	8 + 8	52/60	2/8	Safe
6	Cha-Cha-Cha Raised dance (+0 points)	I Follow Rivers - Lykke Li Murder on the Dancefloor - Sophie Ellis-Bextor	8 + 7	8 + 7	9 + 8	7 + 6	60/90	6/7	Bottom 2 (later safe)
7	Jive Jazz Broadway	Wake Me Up Before You Go-Go - Wham! My Heart Belongs to Daddy - Marilyn Monroe	10 + 9 10 + 9	9 + 7 9 + 9	10 + 9 10 + 9	8 + 7 9 + 8	142/160	1/6	Safe
8	Rumba (in trio with Alizée) Waltz	Ma Benz - Brigitte Je vole - Louane Emera	9 + 9 10 + 10	9 + 9 10 + 8	9 + 9 9 + 9	9 + 9 9 + 9	146/160	1/5	Safe
9	Paso Doble (in trio with Jean-Marc Généreux) Quickstep Jive (face to face)	Requiem - Giuseppe Verdi Candyman - Christina Aguilera Great Balls of Fire - Jerry Lee Lewis	10 + 9 10 + 9 N/A	N/A 10 + 10 N/A	10 + 9 9 + 9 N/A	9 + 9 9 + 9 N/A	131/140	1=/4	Bottom 2 (safe with 58%)
10	Foxtrot Jazz Broadway Freestyle	Life on Mars - David Bowie My Heart Belongs to Daddy - Marilyn Monroe Wings - Birdy	10 + 9 10 + 10 N/A	10 + 9 10 + 10 N/A	9 + 9 10 + 9 N/A	9 + 9 10 + 9 N/A	152/160	1=/3	Runners-up (with 46%)

== Filmography ==
=== Television ===
- 2018-2020 : Les Bracelets rouges (fr) - Aurore (12 episodes)
- 2018 : Maman a tort (fr) - Angélique "Angie" Fontaine (6 episodes)
- 2019 : Le Bazar de la Charité - Alice de Jeansin (8 episodes)
- 2021-2023 : Je te promets (fr), French remake of US TV series This Is Us - Florence Gallo (32 episodes)
- 2021 : J'ai menti - Audrey Barreyre (6 episodes)
- 2021 : Christmas Flow - Mel (3 episodes)
- 2022 : Women at War - Suzanne Faure (8 episodes)
- 2024-present : Cat's Eyes - Tamara Chamade
- 2024 : Anthracite (Limited series) - Giovanna DeLuca (6 episodes)

=== Film ===
- 2012 : 1789: Les Amants de la Bastille (Filming of the stage musical) - Olympe du Puget, governess to Louis Joseph, Dauphin of France
- 2015 : La Légende du roi Arthur (Filming of the stage musical) - Queen Guinevere
- 2019 : Jusqu'ici tout va bien (fr) - Élodie
- 2020 : Play (fr) - Fanny
- 2021 : Spoiled Brats (fr) - Stella Bartek
- 2023 : Our Tiny Little Wedding (fr) - Lou
- 2023 : Open Season - Adélaïde
- 2025 : Natacha, air hostess
