= Virginie Pouchain =

- Born: October 13 1980; Saint-Montan, France
- Origin: France

Virginie Pouchain (born October 13, 1980 in Saint-Montan, Ardèche), is a singer and hairdresser from the département of Ardèche in southern France. On 14 March 2006 she was selected by the viewers of France 3 and a jury presided by Charles Aznavour to represent France in Eurovision Song Contest 2006. For the French national grand finale, she sang Céline Dion's hit song Pour que tu m'aimes encore. In Athens, Virginie performed a song – written especially for the occasion by the German-born singer Corneille – entitled Il était temps (It's about time). She finished in the third-to-last position scoring only five points.

Preceded by Ortal with Chacun pense à soi	France in the Eurovision Song Contest; 2006	Succeeded by Les Fatals Picards with L'amour à la française
