= Julien Lepers =

French musician

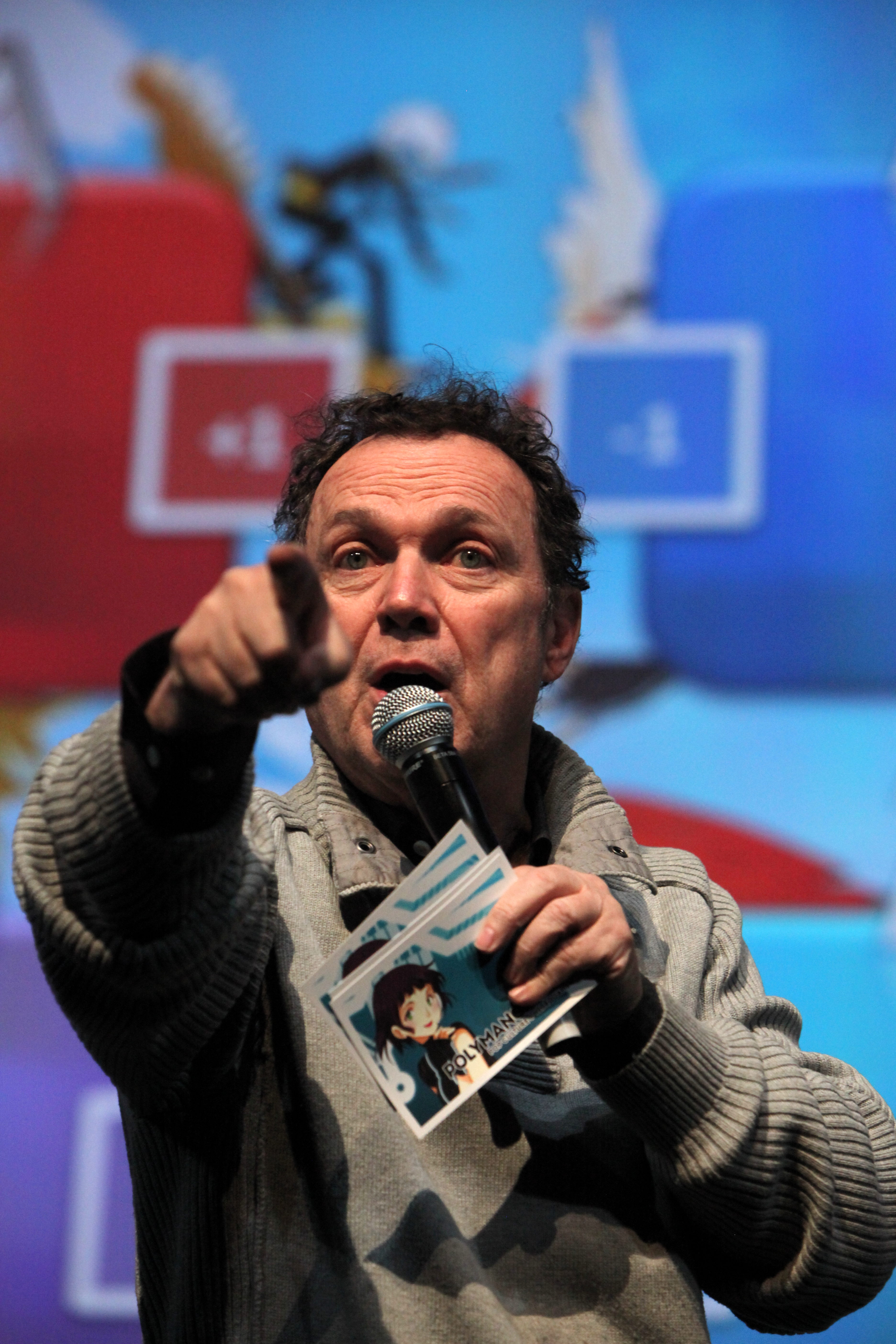
- Julien Lepers at Polymanga 2016
- Born: Ronan Gerval Lepers; 12 August 1949 (age 77); Paris, France
- Presenting career
- Show: Questions pour un champion
- Network: France 3, TV5Monde
- Country: France

Julien Lepers (French pronunciation: [ʒyljɛ̃ ləpɛʁs]; whose real name is Ronan Gerval Lepers) is a French television and radio presenter, and a singer-songwriter, born on 12 August 1949 in Paris.

== Biography ==
=== Early life ===
Son of the conductor Raymond Lepers and the singer Maria Rémusat, and grandson of the painter Claude Rémusat, Lepers was born in Paris but spent his childhood in Antibes, then in Saint-Dié-des-Vosges. He studied law at the University of Nice Sophia Antipolis, and became licentiate.

=== Career as a host ===
Lepers won a presenter contest organised by Jean-Pierre Foucault at the radio station RMC where he became a radio host, from 1973 to 1978. There, he was Mister Hit parade before moving to RTL.

In the eighties, Lepers was the host for a year of À tout cœur, an entertainment programme broadcast by the Swiss TV channel TSR, which featured famous singers.

He debuted as a television host in France in 1986, at the age of 36, on FR3 in La Nouvelle Affiche, and then in the breakfast television show Télématin on Antenne 2.

From November 1988 until February 2016, Lepers hosted Questions pour un champion, the French version of the game show Going for Gold.

In August 1998, Lepers also hosted C'est l'été on France 3.

=== Musical career ===
In 1978 and 1979, Lepers recorded four songs: "De retour de vacances", "Je t'aime trop", "Pleure sous la pluie" and "Oh! Sylvie".

As a self-taught pianist, keen on music, he is the composer of three hits by French singer, Herbert Léonard: "Pour le plaisir" in 1981, "Amoureux fous" (duet with Julie Pietri) in 1983, and "Flagrant délit" (which became a number-one hit in Quebec) in 1985. He has also written many songs for Sylvie Vartan, Michel Delpech and Sheila.

In June 1996, he recorded an album with the Bratislava Symphonic Orchestra. In parallel with his television career, he continues his career as a musician.

=== Court cases ===
On 4 January 1994, Lepers, suspected of tax avoidance, was given a one-year suspended prison sentence as well as a fine of 150,000 French francs. As a consequence, French presenter Vincent Perrot replaced him as host of Questions pour un champion for a few days.

On 15 April 2010, in Cyril Hanouna's show Touche pas à mon poste! aired on France 4, he said that the tax officials made a mistake, were aware of it, and refunded him soon after the sentence.

=== Diversification ===
In 2009, Lepers appeared in a radio advertisement for Saint-Yorre, a brand of bottled mineral water.

In September 2010, in an interview with French newspaper Le Figaro, Lepers says he would enjoy being a news anchor for France 3.

I would enjoy presenting a news programme . It would interest me, and reading a teleprompter is not exactly rocket science! But currently, I also really like economics programmes and, of course, music programmes. In any case, I'm still touring France, Belgium and Switzerland with my orchestra, and composing songs.

In August 2011, Lepers was a jury member for the "Prix Iznogoud" award of the "Humour et Eau Salée" French comedy festival held in Saint-Georges-de-Didonne.

In November 2011, irritated by the misuse of the French language, Lepers published a book with the title Les fautes de Français ? Plus jamais ! (French mistakes? Never again!) in which he says:

Wrong notes offend my ears. They annoy me. A mistake in French has the same effect on me as a wrong note.

.

=== Look-alike ===
Lepers is Michael Keaton's look-alike. This resemblance to the American actor prompted a few sketches.

== Career ==
=== Radio ===
- RMC
  - Hit Parade
- RTL
  - Challenger,
  - Studio 22,
  - Les Ambassadeurs
  - Départ Immédiat
  - Casinos Parade
  - Une journée pas comme les autres,
  - Et pour vous qu'est-ce qu'on peut faire ?
  - La vente aux enchères
  - Stop ou encore until September 1998

=== TV ===
- France 2 :
  - Télématin from 1986 to 1987 then from 1989 to 1990 when William Leymergie couldn't host the programme.
- France 3
  - La Nouvelle Affiche in 1986, followed by Philippe Risoli
  - Questions pour un champion from 7 November 1988 until 20 February 2016 (also broadcast on TV5Monde)
  - Au pied du mur ! in 1992
  - Election of Miss France from 1992 to 1995
  - C'est l'été in 1998
  - Intervilles from 2006 to 2008 with Jean-Christophe Le Texier, Nathalie Simon, Philippe Corti
  - Questions pour un super champion from 10 September 2006 until 20 February 2016
  - Eurovision Song Contest in 1999 and 2000 (alone), then with Guy Carlier in 2005, with Jean-Christophe Le Texier in 2007 and with Jean Paul Gaultier in 2008
  - Le Tournoi d'Orthographe (The Orthograph Tournament) on 22 April 2009
  - Globes de Cristal Award on 6 February 2012
- TSR
  - À tout coeur
- Lepers also hosted some of the following beauty pageants: Miss Lebanon, Miss Mauritius, Miss Europe, Miss Réunion and Miss Suisse Romande.

=== Filmography ===
Lepers has made several appearances in movies and series where he plays himself.

- 1995 : Fantôme avec chauffeur (Ghost with Driver) (directed by Gérard Oury): himself
- 2001 : Un gars, une fille – episode Jean repasse le permis: the driving instructor
- 2002 : Vu à la télé (directed by Daniel Losset): himself
- 2005 : Edy (directed by Stéphan Guérin-Tillié): himself
- 2008 : Vilaine (Ugly Melanie) (directed by Jean-Patrick Benes and Allan Mauduit): himself
- 2009 : 8th Wonderland (directed by Nicolas Alberny and Jean Mach): himself
- 2012 : Fais pas ci, fais pas ça – Fifth season: himself
- 2013 : Y'a pas d'âge: himself

=== Discography ===
- Je t'aime trop (1978)
- Pleure sous la pluie (1978)
- De retour de vacances (1979)
- Oh! Sylvie (1979)

=== Bibliography ===
- Les fautes de Français ? Plus jamais !, Éditions Michel Lafon, 2011

== See also ==
- Questions pour un champion
- France 3
