= Danse avec les stars season 5 =

Danse avec les stars
- Season 5
- Promotional advertisement for the 5th season of Danse avec les Stars; L to R: Nathalie Péchalat, Rayane Bensetti, Tonya Kinzinger, Corneille, Elisa Tovati, Ophélie Winter, Anthony Kavanagh, Joyce Jonathan, Miguel Ángel Muñoz, Louisy Joseph and Brian Joubert
- Celebrity winner: Rayane Bensetti
- Professional winner: Denitsa Ikonomova
- No. of episodes: 10

Release
- Original network: TF1
- Original release: September 27 – November 29, 2014

Season chronology
- ← Previous; Season 4 Next → Season 6

The fifth season of the French version of Strictly Come Dancing premiered on TF1 on September 27, 2014, almost one year to the day after the fourth season. This time, 11 celebrities were paired with 11 professional ballroom dancers, more than the 10 of the previous two seasons. Sandrine Quétier and Vincent Cerutti return as the hosts for this season, while second season winner Shy'm left her judging chair after two years, being replaced by first season winner M. Pokora.

== Participants ==
After months of speculation, the full cast was leaked by the media on July 25, 2014. TF1 confirmed the participations of Nathalie Péchalat on September 3 and Corneille on September 4, revealing which dancers the two would be paired with along the way. The rest of the cast was confirmed by the channel on September 9, along with the premiere date and their respective partners were revealed during a press conference the next day.

David Carreira was announced by the media, but it turned out he was actually participating in the Portuguese version of the program. Of the celebrities participating, Corneille had already been in talks for the previous season while Elisa Tovati had turned down all four previous seasons. In a June 2014 interview, Joyce Jonathan strongly denied her participation, lying that it "wasn't in the cards." Several celebrities, including singers Jean-Pascal Lacoste and Hélène Rollès, confirmed having been approached by TF1 but weren't part of the final cast.

Celebrity	Occupation / known for	Professional partner	Status
Elisa Tovati	Singer & actress	Christian Millette	Eliminated 1st on October 4, 2014
Ophélie Winter	Singer & actress	Christophe Licata	Eliminated 2nd on October 10, 2014
Joyce Jonathan	Singer	Julien Brugel	Eliminated 3rd on October 18, 2014
Anthony Kavanagh	Stand-up comedian & actor	Silvia Notargiacomo; Candice Pascal (Week 5)	Eliminated 4th & 5th on November 1, 2014
Louisy Joseph	Former L5 singer	Guillaume Foucault; Grégoire Lyonnet (Week 5)	Eliminated 4th & 5th on November 1, 2014
Corneille	Singer	Candice Pascal; Silvia Notargiacomo (Week 5)	Eliminated 6th on November 8, 2014
Tonya Kinzinger	Sous le soleil actress & presenter	Maxime Dereymez; Guillaume Foucault (Week 5)	Eliminated 7th on November 15, 2014
Miguel Ángel Muñoz	Un Paso Adelante actor & singer	Fauve Hautot; Katrina Patchett (Week 5)	Eliminated 8th on November 22, 2014
Brian Joubert	Olympic figure skater	Katrina Patchett; Denitsa Ikonomova (Week 5)	Third Place on November 29, 2014
Nathalie Péchalat	Olympic ice dancer	Grégoire Lyonnet (weeks 1–4); Christophe Licata (weeks 6–10); Maxime Dereymez (Week 5)	Second Place on November 29, 2014
Rayane Bensetti	Television actor	Denitsa Ikonomova; Fauve Hautot (Week 5)	Winners on November 29, 2014

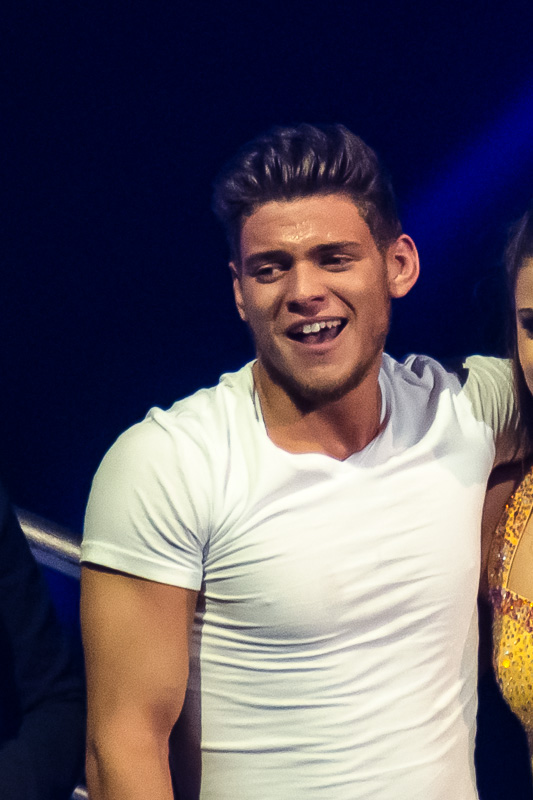
Rayane Bensetti

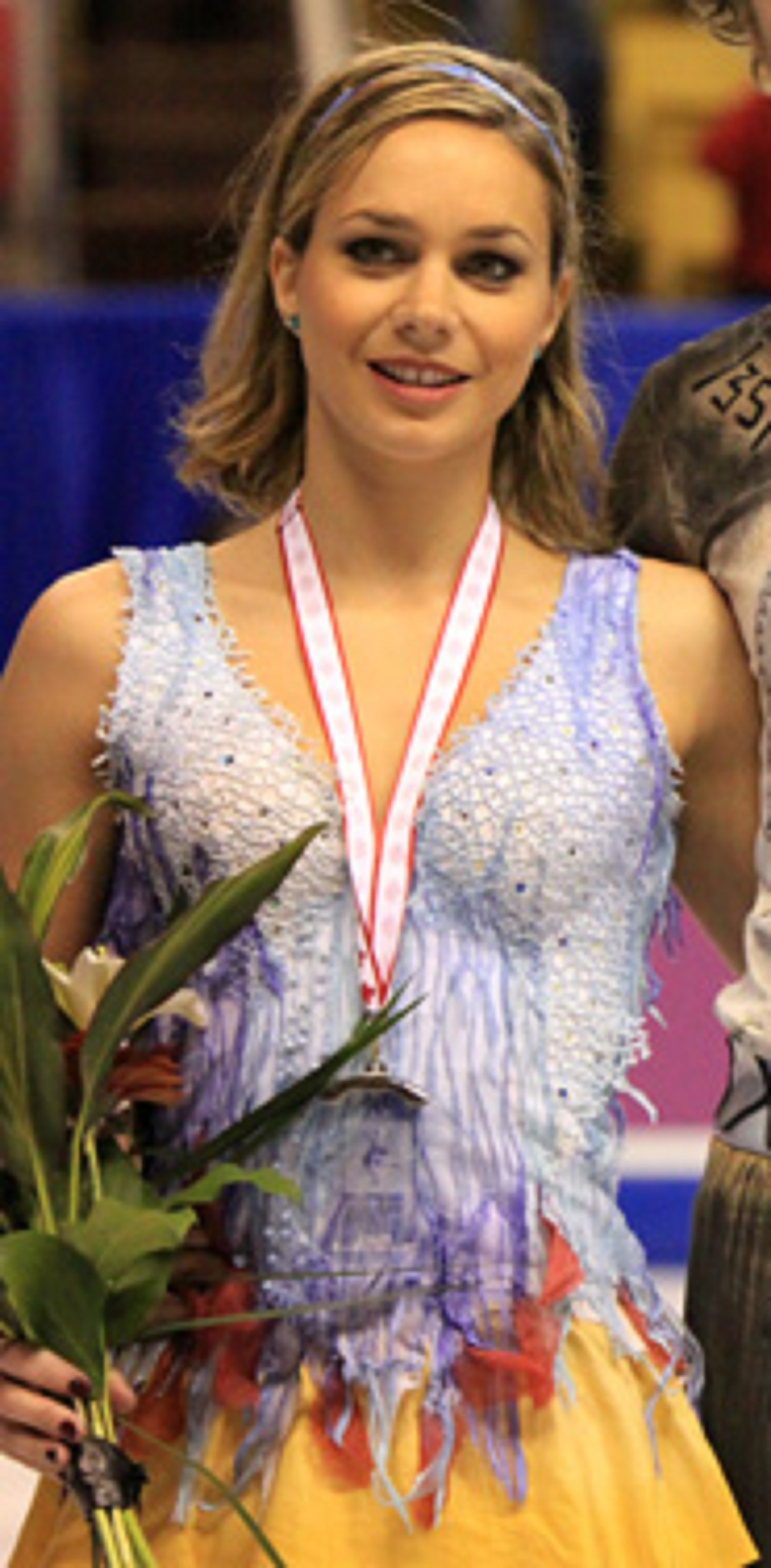
Nathalie Péchalat

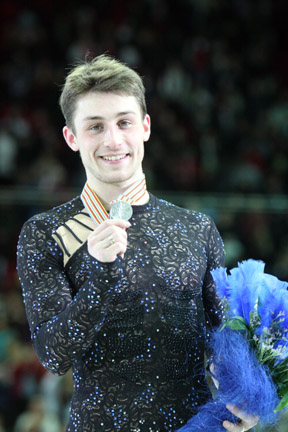
Brian Joubert

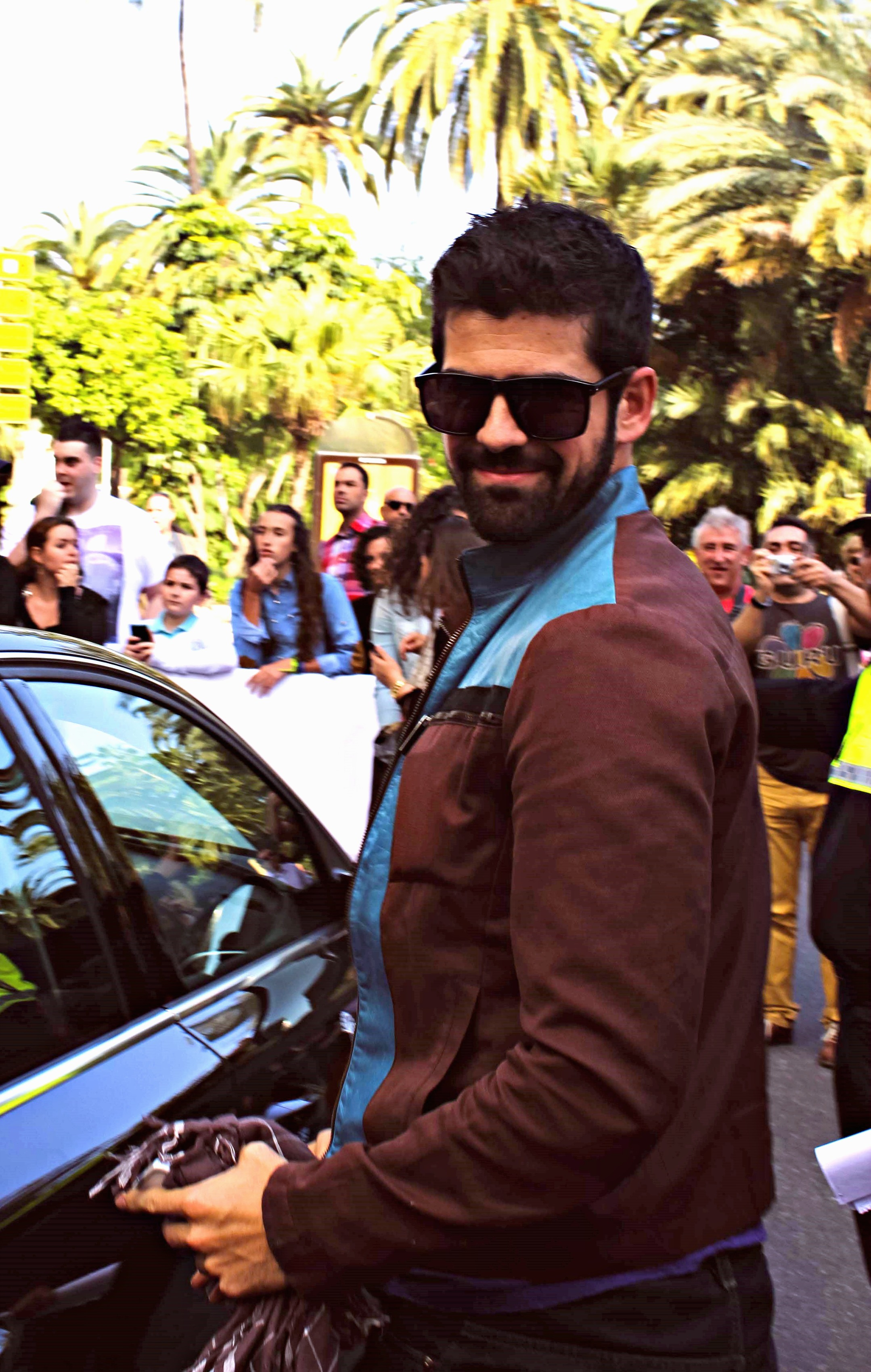
Miguel Ángel Muñoz

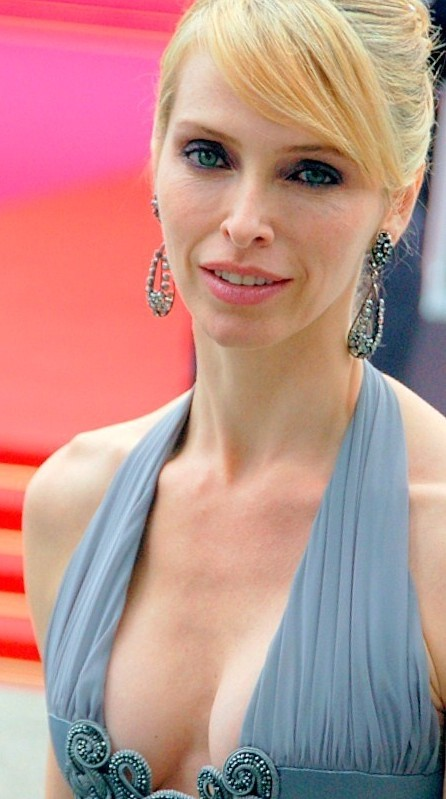
Tonya Kinzinger

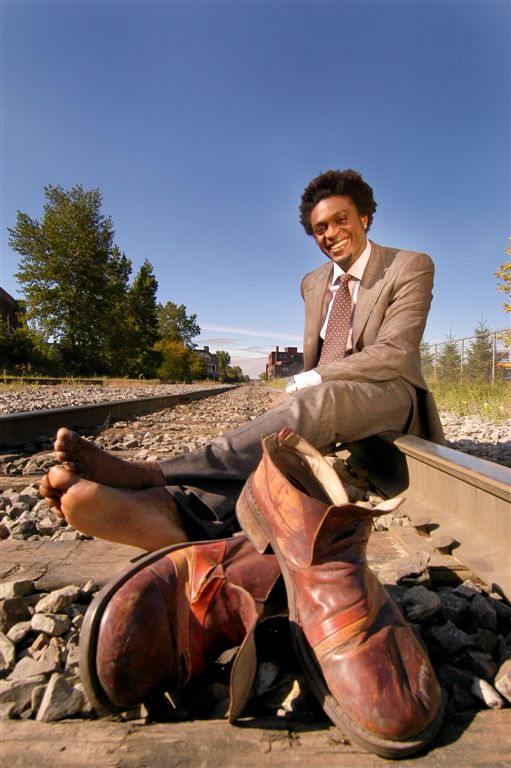
Corneille (singer)

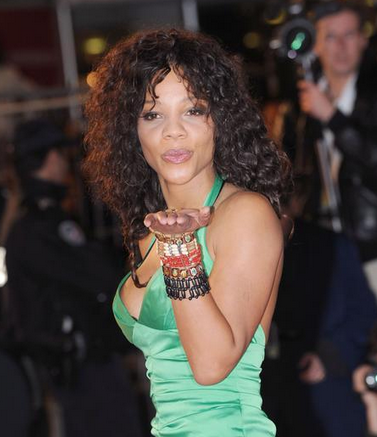
Louisy Joseph

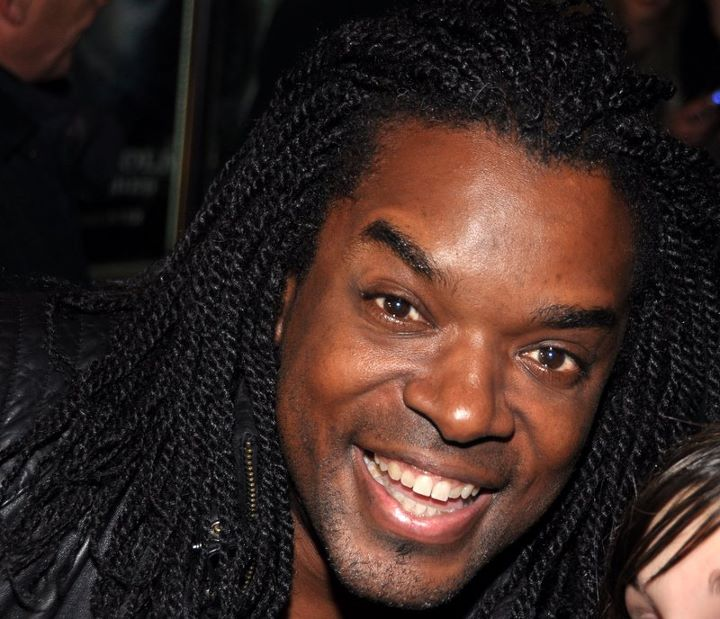
Anthony Kavanagh

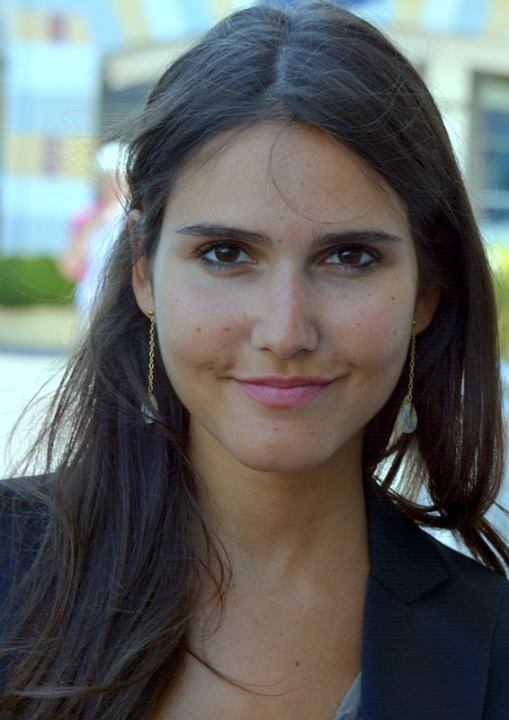
Joyce Jonathan

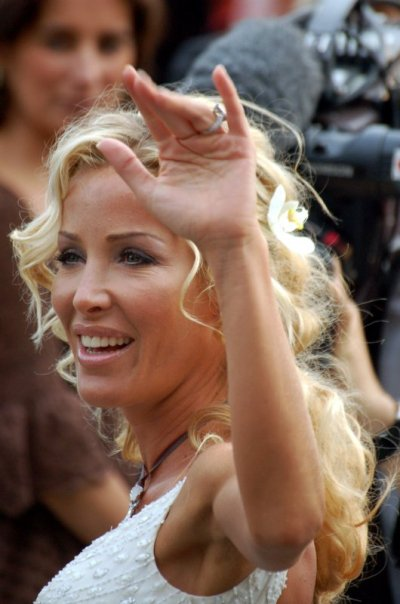
Ophélie Winter

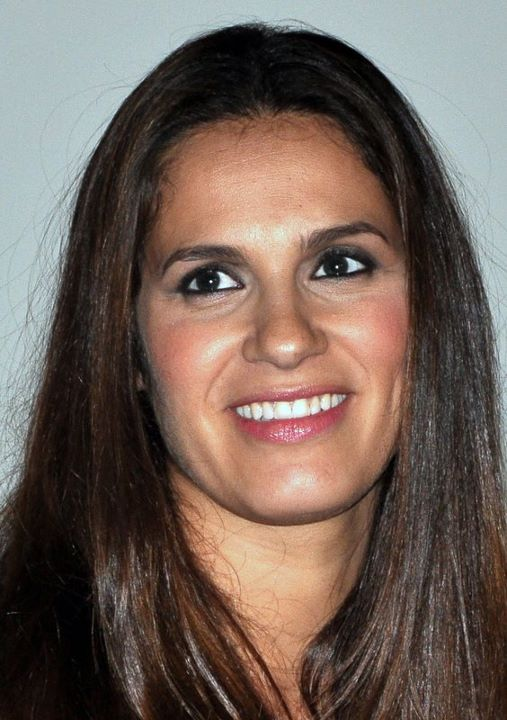
Elisa Tovati

== Scoring ==
Team	Place	1	2	1+2	3	4	5	6	5+6	7	8	9	10
Rayane & Denitsa	1	32	30	62	69	61	75 + 15 = 90	67 + 25 = 92	182	59 + 37 = 96	63 + 59 = 122	73 + 68 = 141	71 + 77 = 34 = 182
Nathalie & Grégoire/Christophe	2	32	32	64	63	68	71 + 40 = 111	73 + 20 = 93	204	76 + 37 = 113	69 + 71 = 140	73 + 75 = 148	76 + 77 + 34 = 187
Brian & Katrina	3	32	32	64	59	62	65 + 25 = 90	67 + 30 = 97	187	57 + 33 = 90	64 + 72 = 136	69 + 67 = 136	72 + 69 + 30 = 171
Miguel & Fauve	4	31	31	62	69	59	70 + 10 = 80	71 + 35 = 106	186	63 + 22 = 85	60 + 59 = 119	67 + 62 = 129	
Tonya & Maxime	5	33	37	70	69	69	66 + 35 = 101	74 + 40 = 114	215	74 + 22 = 96	63 + 73 = 136		
Corneille & Candice	6	25	27	52	62	63	55 + 5 = 60	55 + 5 = 60	120	66 + 33 = 99			
Louisy & Guillaume	7	27	30	57	62	67	55 + 30 = 85	56 + 15 = 71	156				
Anthony & Silvia	7	28	29	57	58	64	53 + 20 = 73	62 + 10 = 72	145				
Joyce & Julien	9	21	20	41	39	44							
Ophélie & Christophe	10	27	23	50	49								
Elisa & Christian	11	25	30	55									

Red numbers indicate the couples with the lowest score for each week.
Blue numbers indicate the couples with the highest score for each week.
indicates the couples eliminated that week.
indicates the returning couple that finished in the bottom two.
indicates the winning couple.
indicates the runner-up couple.
indicates the third place couple.

=== Notes of each couples ===
For the totals, the notes from the duo of week 7 are count only once.

Couple	Total	10	9	8	7	6	5	4	3	2	1	Average
Rayane & Denitsa	104	18	42	25	10	4	3	2	—N/a			8.4
Nathalie & Grégoire/Christophe	104	22	55	23	4	—N/a						8.9
Brian & Katrina	104	4	38	41	16	4	—N/a	1	—N/a			8.2
Miguel & Fauve	84	4	24	28	18	8	2	—N/a				7.9
Tonya & Maxime	68	10	36	10	7	2	3	—N/a				8.5
Corneille & Candice	52	1	7	17	20	3	3	1	—N/a			7.4
Louisy & Guillaume	40	1	3	17	14	3	—N/a	2	—N/a			7.4
Anthony & Silvia	40	—N/a	5	11	19	3	2	—N/a				7.4
Joyce & Julien	24	—N/a			1	12	4	4	3	—N/a		5.2
Ophélie & Christophe	16	—N/a			6	7	3	—N/a				6.2
Elisa & Christian	8	—N/a		3	1	4	—N/a					6.9
Total	644	60	210	175	116	50	20	10	3	0	0	8.0

== Averages ==
This table only counts dances scored on the traditional 40-point scale. Starting from week 3, both technical and artistic scores are tallied.

Rank by average	Place	Couple	Total	Number of dances	Average
1	2	Nathalie & Grégoire/Christophe	927	15	35,65
2	5	Tonya & Maxime	580	10	34.12
3	1	Rayane & Denitsa	875	15	33.65
4	3	Brian & Katrina	850	14	32.69
5	4	Miguel & Fauve	664	12	31.62
6	7	Louisy & Guillaume	297	6	29.70
7	6	Corneille & Candice	386	8	29.69
8	7	Anthony & Silvia	294	6	29.40
9	11	Elisa & Christian	55	2	27.50
10	10	Ophélie & Christophe	99	3	24.75
11	9	Joyce & Julien	124	4	20.67

== Highest and lowest scoring performances ==
The best and worst performances in each dance according to the judges' marks are as follows (starting from week 3, an average between technical and artistic score is used):

Dance	Best dancer	Best score	Worst dancer	Worst score
Rumba	Nathalie Péchalat	36.5	Corneille	27
Cha-Cha-Cha	Nathalie Péchalat	37.5	Joyce Jonathan	20
Contemporary	Rayane Bensetti	37.5	Miguel Ángel Muñoz	29.5
Tango	Nathalie Péchalat	38	Joyce Jonathan	21
Foxtrot	Tonya Kinzinger	37	Corneille	25
Jive	Rayane Bensetti	38.5	Brian Joubert; Anthony Kavanagh; Miguel Ángel Muñoz	31
American Smooth	Nathalie Péchalat	38	Ophélie Winter	23
Samba	Nathalie Péchalat	38.5	Corneille; Louisy Joseph	27.5
Paso Doble	Nathalie Péchalat	38	Anthony Kavanagh	29
Bollywood	Rayane Bensetti	34.5	Rayane Bensetti	34.5
Bolero	Miguel Ángel Muñoz	34.5	Anthony Kavanagh	29
Country	Tonya Kinzinger	34.5	Tonya Kinzinger	34.5
Ballet	Brian Joubert	29.5	Brian Joubert	29.5
Hip Hop	Corneille	31	Corneille	31
Flamenco	Ophélie Winter	24.5	Joyce Jonathan	19.5
Afro Jazz	Nathalie Péchalat	31.5	Nathalie Péchalat	31.5
Lindy Hop	Corneille	31.5	Louisy Joseph	31
Quickstep	Nathalie Péchalat	35.5	Anthony Kavanagh	26.5
Waltz	Brian Joubert	32	Joyce Jonathan	22
Charleston	Brian Joubert	28.5	Brian Joubert	28.5
Salsa	Nathalie Péchalat	35.5	Rayane Bensetti	34
Argentine Tango	Brian Joubert	36	Brian Joubert	36

== Couples' Highest and lowest scoring performances ==
According to the traditional 40-point scale. (starting from week 3, an average between technical and artistic score is used):

Couples	Highest Scoring Dances	Lowest Scoring Dances
Rayane & Denitsa	Jive (38.5)	Rumba/Waltz; Cha-Cha-Cha (29.5)
Nathalie & Grégoire/Christophe	Samba (38.5)	Afro Jazz (31.5)
Brian & Katrina	Argentine Tango; Rumba (36)	Charleston/Samba (28.5)
Miguel & Fauve	Rumba (35.5)	Cha Cha Cha; Contemporary (29.5)
Tonya & Maxime	Foxtrot; Samba; Contemporary/Fox-Trot (37)	Paso Doble (31.5)
Corneille & Candice	Rumba/Contemporary (33)	Fox-Trot (25)
Louisy & Guillaume	Rumba (33.5)	Cha-Cha-Cha (27)
Anthony & Silvia	Samba (32)	Quickstep (26.5)
Joyce & Julien	Waltz (22)	Flamenco (19.5)
Ophélie & Christophe	Cha-Cha-Cha (27)	American Smooth (23)
Elisa & Christian	American Smooth (30)	Tango (25)

== Styles, scores and songs ==
=== Week 1 ===
Individual judges scores in the chart below (given in parentheses) are listed in this order from left to right: Jean-Marc Généreux, Marie-Claude Pietragalla, Matt Pokora, Chris Marques.

Running order

Couple	Score	Style	Music
Tonya & Maxime	33 (8,9,8,8)	Rumba	Drunk in Love – Beyoncé Ft Jay-Z
Anthony & Silvia	28 (7,7,7,7)	Cha-Cha-Cha	Give Me the Night – George Benson
Brian & Katrina	32 (8,8,8,8)	Contemporary	Every Breath You Take – Akram Sedkaoui (The Police, Sting's song)
Elisa & Christian	25 (6,7,6,6)	Tango	Emmenez-moi – Charles Aznavour
Miguel & Fauve	31 (7,8,8,8)	Tango	Addicted to You – Avicii
Nathalie & Grégoire	32 (8,8,8,8)	Contemporary	Chandelier – Sia
Louisy & Guillaume	27 (7,7,7,6)	Cha-Cha-Cha	Dare (La La La) – Shakira
Corneille & Candice	25 (6,7,7,5)	Foxtrot	Let It Be – The Beatles
Rayane & Denitsa	32 (8,8,8,8)	Jive	Happy – Pharrell Williams
Ophélie & Christophe	27 (7,7,7,6)	Cha-Cha-Cha	Love Never Felt So Good – Michael Jackson
Joyce & Julien	21 (6,5,6,4)	Tango	Dernière danse – Indila

=== Week 2 : Personal Story Week ===
Individual judges scores in the chart below (given in parentheses) are listed in this order from left to right: Jean-Marc Généreux, Marie-Claude Pietragalla, Matt Pokora, Chris Marques.

Running order

Couple	Score		Style	Music	Result
Couple	Week 2	Week 1+2	Style	Music	Result
Nathalie & Grégoire	32 (8,8,9,7)	64	Cha-Cha-Cha	A Sky Full of Stars – Coldplay	Safe
Ophélie & Christophe	23 (6,6,6,5)	50	American Smooth	Alter Ego – Jean-Louis Aubert	Safe
Miguel & Fauve	31 (7,9,8,7)	62	Samba	María – Ricky Martin	Safe
Corneille & Candice	27 (7,7,7,6)	52	Rumba	Reposez en paix – Corneille	Safe
Rayane & Denitsa	30 (8,8,8,6)	62	Foxtrot	Changer – Maître Gims	Safe
Brian & Katrina	32 (8,9,8,7)	64	Tango	Waka Waka (This Time for Africa) – Shakira	Safe
Elisa & Christian	30 (8,8,8,6)	55	American Smooth	Be My Baby – The Ronettes	Eliminated
Tonya & Maxime	37 (9,10,10,8)	70	Foxtrot	Vole – Celine Dion	Safe
Joyce & Julien	20 (6,6,5,3)	41	Cha-Cha-Cha	Problem – Ariana Grande	Safe
Anthony & Silvia	29 (8,8,7,6)	57	Paso Doble	Stayin' Alive – Bee Gees	Last to be called Safe
Louisy & Guillaume	30 (7,8,8,7)	57	Contemporary	You & Me – Disclosure	Safe

=== Week 3 : New Dances Week ===
Individual judges scores in the chart below (given in parentheses) are listed in this order from left to right: Jean-Marc Généreux, Marie-Claude Pietragalla, Matt Pokora, Chris Marques.

Running order

Couple	Results			Style	Music	Results
Couple	Artistic	Technical	Total	Style	Music	Results
Rayane & Denitsa	36 (9,10,9,8)	33 (8,9,9,7)	69	Bollywood	Mundian To Bach Ke (Knight Rider Bhangra) – Panjabi MC	Safe
Miguel & Fauve	37 (9,10,10,8)	32 (7,9,9,7)	69	Bolero	J'te mentirais – Patrick Bruel	Safe
Tonya & Maxime	35 (9,10,9,7)	34 (9,9,9,7)	69	Country	Wake Me Up – Avicii	Safe
Brian & Katrina	33 (8,8,9,8)	26 (7,6,7,6)	59	Ballet	Primavera – Ludovico Einaudi	Safe
Corneille & Candice	33 (8,9,9,7)	29 (8,7,7,7)	62	Hip Hop	U Can't Touch This – MC Hammer	Bottom 2
Joyce & Julien	22 (6,6,6,4)	17 (4,5,5,3)	39	Flamenco	Bamboléo – Gipsy Kings	Safe
Nathalie & Grégoire	33 (9,8,9,7)	30 (7,8,8,7)	63	Afro Jazz	Animals – Martin Garrix	Safe
Anthony & Silvia	30 (8,8,8,6)	28 (7,7,7,7)	58	Bolero	Forever Young – Alphaville	Safe
Louisy & Guillaume	33 (8,9,8,8)	29 (6,8,8,7)	62	Lindy Hop	Halo / Walking on Sunshine – Glee	Safe
Ophélie & Christophe	25 (6,7,7,5)	24 (6,7,6,5)	49	Flamenco	La Isla Bonita – Madonna	Eliminated
Dance Duel
Corneille & Candice	75%			Flamenco	Color Gitano – Kendji Girac	Safe
Ophélie & Christophe	25%			Flamenco	Color Gitano – Kendji Girac	Eliminated

=== Week 4 : Idol Week ===
Individual judges scores in the chart below (given in parentheses) are listed in this order from left to right: Jean-Marc Généreux, Marie-Claude Pietragalla, Matt Pokora, Chris Marques.

Running order

Couple	Results			Style	Music	Result
Couple	Artistic	Technical	Total	Style	Music	Result
Rayane & Denitsa	33 (8,9,9,7)	28 (7,9,7,5)	61	Samba	Wanna Be Startin' Somethin' – Michael Jackson	Safe
Miguel & Fauve	31 (7,8,9,7)	28 (6,8,7,7)	59	Cha-Cha-Cha	(I've Had) The Time of My Life – Bill Medley Ft Jennifer Warnes	Safe
Louisy & Guillaume	35 (9,9,10,7)	32 (8,8,8,8)	67	Rumba	Il me dit que je suis belle – Patricia Kaas	Safe
Tonya & Maxime	36 (9,9,10,8)	33 (8,9,9,7)	69	Quickstep	Show Me How You Burlesque – Christina Aguilera	Safe
Corneille & Candice	32 (8,8,9,7)	31 (8,8,8,7)	63	Lindy Hop	I Got a Woman – Rudedog feat.Ray Charles	Safe
Joyce & Julien	25 (6,6,7,6)	19 (4,6,6,3)	44	Waltz	Mistral gagnant – Cœur de pirate (Renaud's song)	Eliminated
Brian & Katrina	31 (8,8,8,7)	31 (7,8,8,8)	62	Jive	Video Games – The Baseballs (Lana Del Rey's song)	Safe
Nathalie & Grégoire	35 (9,9,9,8)	33 (8,8,9,8)	68	Rumba	Dis-lui toi que Je t'aime – Vanessa Paradis	Safe
Anthony & Silvia	34 (9,9,9,7)	30 (7,8,8,7)	64	Samba	We Are One (Ole Ola) – Pitbull Ft Jennifer Lopez & Claudia Leitte	Bottom 2
Dance Duel
Anthony & Silvia	82%			Cha-Cha-Cha	Rather Be – Clean Bandit Ft Jess Glynne	Safe
Joyce & Julien	18%			Cha-Cha-Cha	Rather Be – Clean Bandit Ft Jess Glynne	Eliminated

=== Week 5 : Partner Switch-Up ===
Individual judges scores in the chart below (given in parentheses) are listed in this order from left to right: Jean-Marc Généreux, Marie-Claude Pietragalla, Matt Pokora, Chris Marques.

The couples were required to switch professional partners this week and learn a new style of dance. Due to the nature of the week, no elimination took place at the end of the show.

Running order

Couple	Results			Style	Music
Couple	Artistic	Technical	Total	Style	Music
Rayane & Fauve	38 (9,10,10,9)	37 (9,10,9,9)	75	Contemporary	Another Love – Tom Odell
Nathalie & Maxime	35 (9,9,9,8)	36 (9,9,9,9)	71	Quickstep	You Can't Hurry Love – The Supremes
Brian & Denitsa	34 (8,9,9,8)	31 (8,8,8,7)	65	Samba	Gasolina – Daddy Yankee
Tonya & Guillaume	34 (7,9,10,8)	32 (7,9,9,7)	66	Tango	Dark Horse – Katy Perry Ft Juicy J
Corneille & Silvia	31 (7,8,9,7)	24 (5,7,7,5)	55	Samba	Ta fête – Stromae
Louisy & Grégoire	30 (7,8,8,7)	25 (4,8,7,6)	55	Samba	I Follow Rivers – Lykke Li
Anthony & Candice	28 (7,7,7,7)	25 (5,7,7,6)	53	Quickstep	Single Ladies – Beyoncé
Miguel & Katrina	35 (8,9,9,9)	35 (8,9,9,9)	70	Foxtrot	Paris-Seychelles – Julien Doré
Cha-Cha-Cha Relay
Nathalie & Maxime	+ 40		111	Cha-Cha-Cha	Counting Stars – OneRepublic
Tonya & Guillaume	+ 35		101	Cha-Cha-Cha	Counting Stars – OneRepublic
Louisy & Grégoire	+ 30		85	Cha-Cha-Cha	Counting Stars – OneRepublic
Brian & Denitsa	+ 25		90	Cha-Cha-Cha	Counting Stars – OneRepublic
Anthony & Candice	+ 20		73	Cha-Cha-Cha	Counting Stars – OneRepublic
Rayane & Fauve	+ 15		90	Cha-Cha-Cha	Counting Stars – OneRepublic
Miguel & Katrina	+ 10		80	Cha-Cha-Cha	Counting Stars – OneRepublic
Corneille & Silvia	+ 5		60	Cha-Cha-Cha	Counting Stars – OneRepublic

=== Week 6 : Dance Marathon ===
Individual judges scores in the chart below (given in parentheses) are listed in this order from left to right: Jean-Marc Généreux, Marie-Claude Pietragalla, Matt Pokora, Chris Marques.

Due to rules, two eliminations took place at the end of the show.

Due to personal reasons Grégoire Lyonnet has left the show and so, his partner Nathalie Péchalat got coupled with Christophe Licata for the rest of the season.

The Dance Marathon: couples must dance as long as possible until the disposal by judges. The first elimination is assigned 5 points, second – 10 points and so on until the last 40 points for the winner. Three completely different dances are jive, flamenco and country.

Running order

Couple	Results			Style	Music	Result
Couple	Artistic	Technical	Total	Style	Music	Result
Rayane & Denitsa	37 (9,10,9,9)	30 (7,9,9,5)	67	American Smooth	Smile – Michael Bublé	Safe
Tonya & Maxime	37 (9,9,10,9)	37 (9,9,10,9)	74	Samba	On the Floor – Jennifer Lopez Ft Pitbull	Safe
Brian & Katrina	35 (9,9,9,8)	32 (7,8,9,8)	67	Rumba	À ma place – Zazie Ft Axel Bauer	Safe
Nathalie & Christophe	38 (9,10,10,9)	35 (9,9,9,8)	73	Rumba	La Ceinture – Élodie Frégé	Safe
Corneille & Candice	30 (7,8,8,7)	25 (6,7,8,4)	55	Quickstep	Hey Goldmember – Beyoncé	Safe
Louisy & Guillaume	31 (8,8,8,7)	25 (7,7,7,4)	56	Tango	Can't Remember to Forget You – Shakira Ft Rihanna	Eliminated
Anthony & Silvia	33 (9,9,8,7)	29 (8,8,8,5)	62	Jive	L'Aventurier – Indochine	Eliminated
Miguel & Fauve	37 (9,9,10,9)	34 (8,9,9,8)	71	Rumba	With or Without You – U2	Safe
Dance Marathon
Tonya & Maxime	+ 40		114	Jive + Flamenco + Country	Ça (C'est vraiment toi) – Téléphone + Bella – Kendji Girac + Timber – Pitbull Ft Kesha	
Miguel & Fauve	+ 35		106	Jive + Flamenco + Country	Ça (C'est vraiment toi) – Téléphone + Bella – Kendji Girac + Timber – Pitbull Ft Kesha	
Brian & Katrina	+ 30		97	Jive + Flamenco + Country	Ça (C'est vraiment toi) – Téléphone + Bella – Kendji Girac + Timber – Pitbull Ft Kesha	
Rayane & Denitsa	+ 25		92	Jive + Flamenco + Country	Ça (C'est vraiment toi) – Téléphone + Bella – Kendji Girac + Timber – Pitbull Ft Kesha	
Nathalie & Christophe	+ 20		93	Jive + Flamenco + Country	Ça (C'est vraiment toi) – Téléphone + Bella – Kendji Girac + Timber – Pitbull Ft Kesha	
Louisy & Guillaume	+ 15		71	Jive + Flamenco + Country	Ça (C'est vraiment toi) – Téléphone + Bella – Kendji Girac + Timber – Pitbull Ft Kesha	
Anthony & Silvia	+ 10		72	Jive + Flamenco + Country	Ça (C'est vraiment toi) – Téléphone + Bella – Kendji Girac + Timber – Pitbull Ft Kesha	
Corneille & Candice	+ 5		60	Jive + Flamenco + Country	Ça (C'est vraiment toi) – Téléphone + Bella – Kendji Girac + Timber – Pitbull Ft Kesha	

=== Week 7: Dance Fusion Week ===
Individual judges scores in the chart below (given in parentheses) are listed in this order from left to right: Jean-Marc Généreux, Marie-Claude Pietragalla, Matt Pokora, Chris Marques.

Running order

Couple	Results			Style	Music	Result
Couple	Artistic	Technical	Total	Style	Music	Result
Miguel & Fauve	33 (8,8,9,8)	30 (7,8,8,7)	63	Samba/Paso Doble	We Will Rock You – Queen	Safe
Tonya & Maxime	37 (9,9,10,9)	37 (9,9,10,9)	74	Contemporary/Foxtrot	Unconditionally – Katy Perry	Safe
Brian & Katrina	32 (9,8,8,7)	25 (7,7,7,4)	57	Charleston/Samba	Les Limites – Julien Doré	Bottom 2
Rayane & Denitsa	34 (8,9,9,8)	25 (6,8,7,4)	59	Rumba/Waltz	Fais-moi une place – Julien Clerc	Safe
Nathalie & Christophe	38 (9,10,10,9)	38 (9,10,10,9)	76	Tango/Paso Doble	Sweet Dreams (Are Made of This) – Eurythmics	Safe
Corneille & Candice	35 (8,9,10,8)	31 (7,8,8,8)	66	Rumba/Contemporary	All of Me – John Legend	Eliminated
Celebrity + celebrity
Miguel & Fauve; Tonya & Maxime	22 (5,6,6,5)		85; 96	Cha-Cha-Cha	Maps – Maroon 5	
Brian & Katrina; Corneille & Candice	33 (8,9,9,7)		90; 99	American Smooth	Mes emmerdes – Dany Brillant, Philippe Lellouche & Damien Sargue (Forever Gentlemen-2)	
Rayane & Denitsa; Nathalie & Christophe	37 (9,10,9,9)		96; 113	Jive	You're the One That I Want – Olivia Newton-John & John Travolta	
Dance Duel
Brian & Katrina	59%			Jive	Shake It Off – Taylor Swift	Safe
Corneille & Candice	41%			Jive	Shake It Off – Taylor Swift	Eliminated

=== Week 8: Shameful songs ===
Individual judges scores in the chart below (given in parentheses) are listed in this order from left to right: Jean-Marc Généreux, Marie-Claude Pietragalla, Matt Pokora, Chris Marques.

Running order

Couple	Results				Style	Music	Result
Couple	Artistic	Technical	Total		Style	Music	Result
Rayane & Denitsa	34 (8,10,9,7)	29 (7,8,8,6)	63	122	Quickstep	Je Suis Ton Meilleur ami (Friend Like Me, Aladdin) – Richard Darbois	Safe
Rayane & Denitsa	34 (9,10,9,6)	25 (5,8,8,4)	59	122	Cha-Cha-Cha	Blurred Lines – Robin Thicke ft. Pharrell Williams	Safe
Nathalie & Christophe	35 (8,9,10,8)	34 (8,9,9,8)	69	140	American Smooth	Reality – Richard Sanderson	Safe
Nathalie & Christophe	37 (9,10,9,9)	34 (8,9,9,8)	71	140	Salsa	I Like It – The Blackout All-Stars & Tito Nieves	Safe
Tonya & Maxime	35 (9,9,9,8)	28 (5,8,8,7)	63	136	Paso doble	La Salsa du Démon – Le Grand Orchestre du Splendid	Eliminated
Tonya & Maxime	37 (9,9,10,9)	36 (9,9,9,9)	73	136	Jive	Happy – C2C	Eliminated
Brian & Katrina	31 (8,8,9,6)	33 (8,8,9,8)	64	136	Waltz	Laisse-moi t'aimer – Mike Brant	Safe
Brian & Katrina	37 (9,10,10,8)	35 (9,9,9,8)	72	136	Argentine Tango	Tous les memes – Stromae	Safe
Miguel & Fauve	31 (7,7,9,8)	29 (6,7,8,8)	60	119	Waltz	Hero – Mariah Carey	Last to be called Safe
Miguel & Fauve	33 (8,8,8,9)	26 (6,7,7,6)	59	119	Contemporary	Wasting My Young Years – London Grammar	Last to be called Safe

=== Week 9: Dance trio week ===
Individual judges scores in the chart below (given in parentheses) are listed in this order from left to right: Jean-Marc Généreux, Marie-Claude Pietragalla, Matt Pokora, Chris Marques.

Running order

Couple	Results				Style	Music	Result
Couple	Artistic	Technical	Total		Style	Music	Result
Rayane & Denitsa	38 (9,10,10,9)	35 (8,10,9,8)	73	141	Tango (with Luize Darzniece)	El Tango de Roxanne for the film Moulin Rouge – Ewan McGregor, José Feliciano, Jacek Koman	Safe
Rayane & Denitsa	36 (9,9,9,9)	32 (7,9,9,7)	68	141	Salsa	Mambo No. 5 (A Little Bit Of) – Lou Bega	Safe
Nathalie & Christophe	36 (9,9,9,9)	37 (9,9,10,9)	73	148	Jive (with Christian Millette)	Gabrielle – Johnny Hallyday	Safe
Nathalie & Christophe	38 (9,10,10,9)	37 (9,9,10,9)	75	148	Cha-Cha-Cha	Le Temps qui court – Alain Chamfort	Safe
Miguel & Fauve	37 (9,9,10,9)	30 (7,8,8,7)	67	129	Rumba (with Candice Pascal)	Crazy in Love for the film Fifty Shades of Grey – Beyoncé – Sofia Karlbergs version	Eliminated
Miguel & Fauve	34 (9,8,9,8)	28 (6,8,8,6)	62	129	Jive	Maniac for the film Flashdance – Michael Sembello	Eliminated
Brian & Katrina	34 (9,9,9,7)	35 (8,9,9,9)	69	136	Paso Doble (with Silvia Notargiacomo)	Party Rock Anthem – LMFAO	Bottom 2
Brian & Katrina	35 (9,9,9,8)	32 (7,9,9,7)	67	136	Foxtrot	Feel – Robbie Williams	Bottom 2
Dance Duel
Brian & Katrina	55%				Jive	Can't Hold Us – Macklemore & Ryan Lewis	Safe
Miguel & Fauve	45%				Jive	Can't Hold Us – Macklemore & Ryan Lewis	Eliminated

=== Week 10: Finals ===
Individual judges scores in the chart below (given in parentheses) are listed in this order from left to right: Jean-Marc Généreux, Marie-Claude Pietragalla, Matt Pokora, Chris Marques.

Running order

Couple	Results				Style	Music	Result
Couple	Artistic	Technical	Total		Style	Music	Result
Rayane & Denitsa	38 (9,10,10,9)	33 (8,9,8,8)	71	148	Contemporary	Earth Song – Michael Jackson	Winner
Rayane & Denitsa	39 (10,10,10,9)	38 (9,10,10,9)	77	148	Jive	Footloose – Kenny Loggins	Winner
Nathalie & Christophe	39 (10,10,10,9)	37 (9,9,10,9)	76	153	American Smooth	It's Oh So Quiet – Björk	2nd Place
Nathalie & Christophe	39 (10,10,10,9)	38 (9,9,10,10)	77	153	Samba	Don't Leave Me This Way – The Communards	2nd Place
Brian & Katrina	38 (9,10,10,9)	34 (8,9,9,8)	72	141	Rumba	J'oublierai ton nom – Johnny Halliday & Carmel	3rd Place
Brian & Katrina	35 (9,9,9,8)	34 (9,9,9,7)	69	141	Jive	J'irai où tu iras – Céline Dion & Jean-Jacques Goldman	3rd Place
Megamix
Rayane & Denitsa	34 (9,8,9,8)		182		Charleston + Waltz + Jive	All Night – Parov Stelar + Hijo de la Luna – Mecano + C'est comme ça – Les Rita Mitsouko	
Nathalie & Christophe	34 (9,8,8,9)		187		Charleston + Waltz + Jive	All Night – Parov Stelar + Hijo de la Luna – Mecano + C'est comme ça – Les Rita Mitsouko	
Brian & Katrina	30 (8,8,8,6)		171		Charleston + Waltz + Jive	All Night – Parov Stelar + Hijo de la Luna – Mecano + C'est comme ça – Les Rita Mitsouko	
The Last Dance
Rayane & Denitsa	52%				Freestyle	My Way – Robbie Williams	
Nathalie & Christophe	48%				Freestyle	If I Ain't Got You – Alicia Keys	

== Dance Chart ==
The celebrities and professional partners danced one of these routines for each corresponding week.

- Week 1 : Cha-Cha-Cha, Contemporary, Foxtrot, Jive, Rumba or Tango
- Week 2 : American Smooth, Cha-Cha-Cha, Foxtrot, Pasodoble, Rumba, Samba or Tango (Personal Story week)
- Week 3 : Afro Jazz, Ballet, Bharata Natyam, Bolero, Country, Flamenco, Hip Hop or Lindy Hop (New Dances week)
- Week 4 : Cha-Cha-Cha, Jive, Lindy Hop, Quickstep, Rumba, Samba or Waltz (Idol week)
- Week 5 : Contemporary, Foxtrot, Quickstep, Samba or Tango (Partner Switch-Up week)
- Week 6 : American Smooth, Jive, Quickstep, Rumba, Samba or Tango (Dance Marathon week)
- Week 7 : Contemporary, Charleston, Foxtrot, Pasodoble, Rumba, Samba, Tango or Waltz (Dance Fusion week)
- Week 8 : American Smooth, Cha-Cha-Cha, Contemporary, Jive, Pasodoble, Quickstep, Salsa, Tango or Waltz (Shameful Songs week)
- Week 9 : Cha-Cha-Cha, Foxtrot, Jive, Pasodoble, Rumba, Salsa, Tango (Semi-finals)
- Week 10 : Charleston, Waltz, Jive, Rumba, Contemporary, American Smooth, Samba, Freestyle (Finals)

Couple	1	2	3	4	5		6		7		8	9		10		
Rayane & Denitsa	Jive	Foxtrot	Bollywood	Samba	Contemporary (with Fauve)	Cha-Cha-Cha Relay	American Smooth	Jive / Flamenco / Country	Rumba / Waltz	Jive (with Nathalie)	Quickstep	Tango (with Luize)	Salsa	Contemporary	Charleston / Waltz / Jive	Freestyle
Rayane & Denitsa	Jive	Foxtrot	Bollywood	Samba	Contemporary (with Fauve)	Cha-Cha-Cha Relay	American Smooth	Jive / Flamenco / Country	Rumba / Waltz	Jive (with Nathalie)	Cha-Cha-Cha	Tango (with Luize)	Salsa	Jive	Charleston / Waltz / Jive	Freestyle
Nathalie & Christophe (& Grégoire)	Contemporary	Cha-Cha-Cha	Afro Jazz	Rumba	Quickstep (with Maxime)	Cha-Cha-Cha Relay	Rumba	Jive / Flamenco / Country	Tango / Pasodoble	Jive (with Rayane)	American Smooth	Jive (with Christian)	Cha-Cha-Cha	American Smooth	Charleston / Waltz / Jive	Freestyle
Nathalie & Christophe (& Grégoire)	Contemporary	Cha-Cha-Cha	Afro Jazz	Rumba	Quickstep (with Maxime)	Cha-Cha-Cha Relay	Rumba	Jive / Flamenco / Country	Tango / Pasodoble	Jive (with Rayane)	Salsa	Jive (with Christian)	Cha-Cha-Cha	Samba	Charleston / Waltz / Jive	Freestyle
Brian & Katrina	Contemporary	Tango	Ballet	Jive	Samba (with Denitsa)	Cha-Cha-Cha Relay	Rumba	Jive / Flamenco / Country	Charleston / Samba	American Smooth (with Corneille)	Waltz	Pasodoble (with Silvia)	Foxtrot	Rumba	Charleston / Waltz / Jive	
Brian & Katrina	Contemporary	Tango	Ballet	Jive	Samba (with Denitsa)	Cha-Cha-Cha Relay	Rumba	Jive / Flamenco / Country	Charleston / Samba	American Smooth (with Corneille)	Argentine Tango	Pasodoble (with Silvia)	Foxtrot	Jive	Charleston / Waltz / Jive	
Miguel & Fauve	Tango	Samba	Bolero	Cha-Cha-Cha	Foxtrot (with Katrina)	Cha-Cha-Cha Relay	Rumba	Jive / Flamenco / Country	Samba / Pasodoble	Cha-Cha-Cha (with Tonya)	Waltz	Rumba (with Candice)	Jive			
Miguel & Fauve	Tango	Samba	Bolero	Cha-Cha-Cha	Foxtrot (with Katrina)	Cha-Cha-Cha Relay	Rumba	Jive / Flamenco / Country	Samba / Pasodoble	Cha-Cha-Cha (with Tonya)	Contemporary	Rumba (with Candice)	Jive			
Tonya & Maxime	Rumba	Foxtrot	Country	Quickstep	Tango (with Guillaume)	Cha-Cha-Cha Relay	Samba	Jive / Flamenco / Country	Contemporary / Foxtrot	Cha-Cha-Cha (with Miguel)	Paso Doble					
Tonya & Maxime	Rumba	Foxtrot	Country	Quickstep	Tango (with Guillaume)	Cha-Cha-Cha Relay	Samba	Jive / Flamenco / Country	Contemporary / Foxtrot	Cha-Cha-Cha (with Miguel)	Jive					
Corneille & Candice	Foxtrot	Rumba	Hip Hop	Lindy Hop	Samba (with Silvia)	Cha-Cha-Cha Relay	Quickstep	Jive / Flamenco / Country	Rumba / Contemporary	American Smooth (with Brian)						
Louisy & Guillaume	Cha-Cha-Cha	Contemporary	Lindy Hop	Rumba	Samba (with Grégoire)	Cha-Cha-Cha Relay	Tango	Jive / Flamenco / Country								
Anthony & Silvia	Cha-Cha-Cha	Paso Doble	Bolero	Samba	Quickstep (with Candice)	Cha-Cha-Cha Relay	Jive	Jive / Flamenco / Country								
Joyce & Julien	Tango	Cha-Cha-Cha	Flamenco	Waltz												
Ophélie & Christophe	Cha-Cha-Cha	American Smooth	Flamenco													
Elisa & Christian	Tango	American Smooth														

Highest scoring dance
Lowest scoring dance
Danced, but not scored

== Musical Guests ==
Date	Performers	Tracks Performed	Dancers
October 10, 2014		Sing – Ed Sheeran	Christian Millette, Christophe Licata, Denitsa Ikonomova, Candice Pascal, Julien Brugel, Guillaume Foucault, Katrina Patchett, Silvia Notargiacomo, Maxime Dereymez, Fauve Hautot, Grégoire Lyonnet, Jean-Marc Généreux, Marie-Claude Pietragalla, Matt Pokora, Chris Marques
October 18, 2014	Matt Pokora	On Danse – Matt Pokora	Matt Pokora, Fauve Hautot, Denitsa Ikonomova, Katrina Patchett, Maxime Dereymez, Christian Millette, Christophe Licata
October 25, 2014		Everybody Needs Somebody to Love – The Blues Brothers	Jean-Marc Généreux, Chris Marques, Fauve Hautot, Katrina Patchett, Denitsa Ikonomova, Candice Pascal, Silvia Notargiacomo, Maxime Dereymez, Christian Millette, Julien Brugel, Guillaume Foucault, Christophe Licata
October 25, 2014		Purple Rain – Prince	Fauve Hautot, Katrina Patchett, Maxime Dereymez
November 1, 2014		Latch – Disclosure	Maxime Dereymez, Christian Millette, Christophe Licata, Denitsa Ikonomova, Candice Pascal, Katrina Patchett
November 1, 2014	Sia	Chandelier – Sia	Fauve Hautot, Denna Thomsen
November 8, 2014	Sister Christina	Like a Virgin – Sister Christina	Maxime Dereymez, Christian Millette, Christophe Licata, Julien Brugel, Denitsa Ikonomova, Candice Pascal, Katrina Patchett, Fauve Hautot
November 15, 2014		Born to Be Alive – Patrick Hernandez	Katrina Patchett, Matt Pokora, Jean-Marc Généreux, Silvia Notargiacomo, Chris Marques, Candice Pascal and couples
November 15, 2014		Stay with Me – Sam Smith	Katrina Patchett, Matt Pokora
November 15, 2014	Shy'm	L'effet de Serre – Shy'm	Maxime Dereymez, Christian Millette, Christophe Licata, Denitsa Ikonomova, Katrina Patchett, Fauve Hautot and professional dancers
November 22, 2014		The Bomb! (These Sounds Fall into My Mind) – The Bucketheads	Jean-Marc Généreux, Chris Marques, Denitsa Ikonomova
November 22, 2014		Dangerous – David Guetta	Christian Millette, Christophe Licata, Julien Brugel, Guillaume Foucault, Denitsa Ikonomova, Candice Pascal, Silvia Notargiacomo, Fauve Hautot
November 22, 2014		Habits (Stay High) (Hippie Sabotage Remix) – Tove Lo	Brahim Zaibat, Katrina Patchett, Fauve Hautot, Christian Millette, Julien Brugel, Guillaume Foucault, Denitsa Ikonomova, Candice Pascal, Yann-Alrick Mortreuil, Coralie Licata and professional dancers (Rock It All)
November 22, 2014	Corneille & Tal	Cheek to Cheek – Corneille & Tal (Forever Gentlemen-2)	Christian Millette, Christophe Licata, Guillaume Foucault, Denitsa Ikonomova, Katrina Patchett, Candice Pascal
November 29, 2014		Jungle – Emma Louise	Fauve Hautot, Guillaume Foucault, Julien Brugel, Christian Millette
November 29, 2014		Blame – Calvin Harris ft John Newman	Fauve Hautot, Christophe Licata, Julien Brugel, Guillaume Foucault, Silvia Notargiacomo, Candice Pascal
November 29, 2014	Zaho, Florent Mothe, David Carreira, Camille Lou, Fabien Incardona	Mon combat (Tir Nam Beo) – Zaho, Florent Mothe, David Carreira, Camille Lou, Fabien Incardona (La Légende Du Roi Arthur, a French stage musical by Dove Attia)	Christian Millette, Julien Brugel, Guillaume Foucault, Silvia Notargiacomo, Fauve Hautot, Candice Pascal

== France television ratings ==
Show	Episode	Air date	Viewers (millions)	Rating/share Viewers over 4	Rating/share Housewives under 50	Weekly Viewer rank	Note
1	"Top 11 Perform (Week 1)"	September 27, 2014	5.097	27.7%	41.3%	1	
2	"Top 11 Perform (Week 2) Personal Story"	October 4, 2014	4.904	25.4%	37%	1	
3	"Top 10 Perform (Week 3) New Dances"	October 10, 2014	5.215	24.8%	35%	1	
4	"Top 9 Perform (Week 4) Idol Week"	October 18, 2014	4.696	24%	33%	1	
5	"Top 8 Perform (Week 5) Switch-Up Week"	October 25, 2014	5.245	25.8%	34%	1	
6	"Top 8 Perform (Week 6) Dance Marathon"	November 1, 2014	5.205	24.4%	34%	1	
7	"Top 6 Perform (Week 7) Dance Fusion Week"	November 8, 2014	4.609	23%	32%	1	
8	"Top 5 Perform (Week 8) Shameful songs"	November 15, 2014	4.889	22.9%	30%	1	
9	"Top 4 Perform (Week 9) Dance trio week"	November 22, 2014	4.934	23.5%	32%	1	
10	"Top 3 Perform (Week 10) Finals"	November 29, 2014	5.074	25.1%	34%	1	
