= Nathalie Péchalat =

French ice dancer

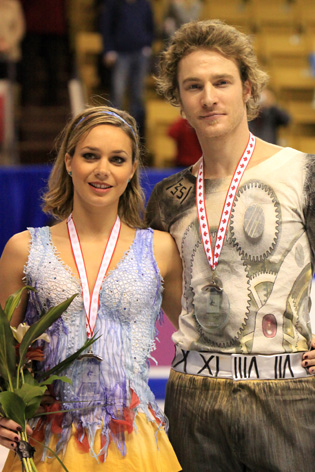
- Péchalat and Bourzat at 2009 Skate Canada

Personal information
- Born: 22 December 1983 (age 42) Rouen, France
- Height: 1.63 m (5 ft 4 in)

Figure skating career
- Country: France
- Partner: Fabian Bourzat
- Began skating: 1990
- Retired: 2014
Event	Gold medal – first place	Silver medal – second place	Bronze medal – third place
World Championships	0	0	2
European Championships	2	0	0
Grand Prix Final	0	1	4
French Championships	5	3	2
Medal list
World Championships
Bronze medal – third place	2012 Nice	Ice dance
Bronze medal – third place	2014 Saitama	Ice dance
European Championships
Gold medal – first place	2011 Bern	Ice dance
Gold medal – first place	2012 Sheffield	Ice dance
Grand Prix Final
Silver medal – second place	2010–11 Beijing	Ice dance
Bronze medal – third place	2009–10 Tokyo	Ice dance
Bronze medal – third place	2011–12 Quebec City	Ice dance
Bronze medal – third place	2012–13 Sochi	Ice dance
Bronze medal – third place	2013–14 Fukuoka	Ice dance
French Championships
Gold medal – first place	2009 Colmar	Ice dance
Gold medal – first place	2011 Tours	Ice dance
Gold medal – first place	2012 Dammarie-les-Lys	Ice dance
Gold medal – first place	2013 Strasbourg	Ice dance
Gold medal – first place	2014 Vaujany	Ice dance
Silver medal – second place	2005 Rennes	Ice dance
Silver medal – second place	2006 Besançon	Ice dance
Silver medal – second place	2007 Orléans	Ice dance
Bronze medal – third place	2003 Asnières	Ice dance
Bronze medal – third place	2004 Briançon	Ice dance

Nathalie Péchalat (French: [natali peʃala]; born 22 December 1983) is a French retired ice dancer and skating official, who served as the president of the Fédération française des sports de glace from 2020 to 2022.

During her competitive career with partner Fabian Bourzat, she was a two-time World bronze medalist (2012, 2014), a two-time European champion (2011–2012), and a five-time French national champion (2009, 2011–2014). They won five medals at the Grand Prix Final (2009, 2010, 2011, 2012, 2013) and thirteen other Grand Prix medals, including three golds at Cup of China and two at Trophée Eric Bompard.

== Personal life ==
Nathalie Péchalat was born 22 December 1983 in Rouen, France. She has an older brother and two sisters. She obtained a BSc degree in sports management and later pursued graduate studies at Emlyon Business School. While training in Moscow, she studied at the Finance University under the Government of the Russian Federation, a prestigious Russian university for economics and finance. She intends to pursue a career in business after her competitive retirement, with a preference for a company involved in sports.

Péchalat is married to French actor Jean Dujardin. Their relationship began in 2014. The couple's first daughter, Jeanne, was born on 5 December 2015. They married on 19 May 2018 in a small ceremony. Their second daughter, Alice, was born on 18 February 2021.

== Early years in skating ==
Nathalie Péchalat began skating at the age of seven, originally as a singles skater. At the age of ten, she switched to ice dancing after her coach, Anne Sophie Druet, suggested she was suited for the discipline and her son was looking for a partner.

Péchalat competed with Julien Deheinzelin on the ISU Junior Grand Prix series in autumn 1997 and 1998. She broke her arm in 1998 and missed six weeks of skating during her three-month recovery. She competed with Michael Zenezini in the 1999–2000 season. He ended their partnership.

== Partnership with Bourzat ==
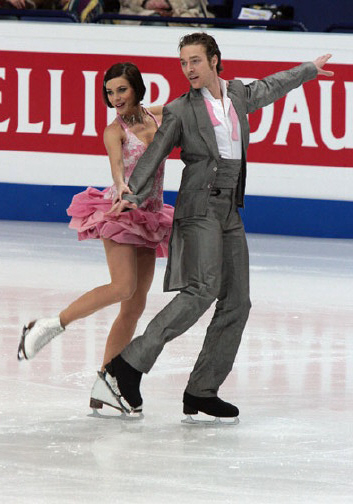
Péchalat and Bourzat at the 2009 Europeans.

In March 2000, Muriel Zazoui suggested Péchalat team up with Fabian Bourzat. The two did not get along well at first but became friends over time. In a 2011 interview, Péchalat said they had different personalities but that he was the ideal skating partner for her: "He is very gifted. He works through feeling and inspiration. As soon as he feels a move, he can reproduce it and interpret it. He does not need to intellectualize." According to Bourzat, "Nathalie is always pulling the couple ahead and pushing us to work. She brings her extraordinary capacity to work. She always wants to do everything perfectly."

Péchalat/Bourzat were coached by Muriel Boucher-Zazoui and Romain Haguenauer from 2000 to mid-2008 in Lyon, France. From 2000 to 2003, they also worked with Pasquale Camerlengo. They skated as juniors for two years, winning two Junior Grand Prix medals, before moving to seniors at the beginning of the 2002–03 season.

=== 2003–2006 ===
Péchalat/Bourzat won bronze medals at the 2003 and 2005 Winter Universiade. They made their Worlds debut in 2004, finishing 20th, and their Europeans debut in 2005, placing 12th. The duo competed at the 2006 Winter Olympics, where they came in 18th.

=== 2006–2008 ===
In the 2006–07 season, Péchalat/Bourzat won their first senior Grand Prix medal, a bronze at the 2006 Skate America. Péchalat lost around eight weeks of training in the winter due to a broken hand. The two missed the 2007 European Championships but were able to compete at the 2007 World Championships, where they finished in 12th place.

In the 2007–08 season, Péchalat/Bourzat won silver at both Skate America and the Cup of Russia, and qualified for their first Grand Prix Final, where they finished 6th. They were forced to miss the 2008 French National Championships after Bourzat underwent knee surgery for a torn meniscus, but returned to the ice in time for the 2008 Europeans, finishing 5th. They were 7th at the 2008 Worlds.

In July 2008, Péchalat/Bourzat moved to Moscow to train under Alexander Zhulin, with whom they had spent a few weeks in 2007, and his assistant Oleg Volkov. They said the move was difficult at first due to not knowing the Russian language and Moscow being a very expensive city to live in, however, from a skating perspective they felt it was a good move.

=== 2009–2010 season ===
For the 2009–10 season, Péchalat/Bourzat were assigned to the Trophée Eric Bompard and Skate Canada as their Grand Prix events. They finished in second place, behind Canadians Tessa Virtue / Scott Moir, in both events. These results qualified them for their second Grand Prix Final. Prior to the final, Bourzat suffered an ankle injury, but they were able to skate well enough to earn their first GPF medal, a bronze.

=== 2010–2011 season ===
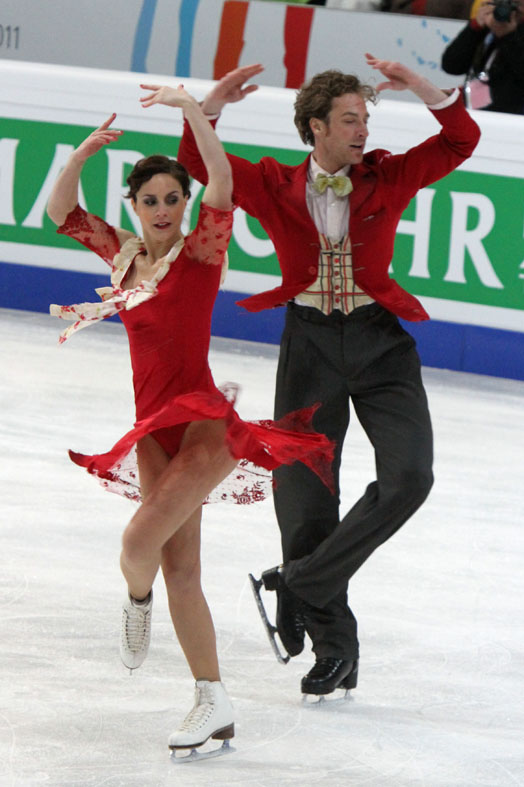
Péchalat and Bourzat compete at the 2011 Europeans.

Péchalat/Bourzat began the 2010–11 season with wins at the Nebelhorn Trophy and the Finlandia Trophy; the former was their first international gold medal at any level. They initially used Amélie for their short dance but replaced it with Doctor Zhivago prior to the 2010 Cup of China, which they won by a large margin. They won their second Grand Prix title at the 2010 Trophée Eric Bompard. Their results qualified them for the Grand Prix Final, where they won the silver medal. They followed this by winning French nationals for the second time in their career. Péchalat/Bourzat went on to win the 2011 Europeans, finishing first in both the short dance and the free dance, and breaking the 100-point barrier in the free dance for the first time in their career. It was their first ever medal at an ISU Championship. They produced France's fifth ice dancing European title.

In mid-February 2011, Péchalat/Bourzat performed in galas in North Korea along with other international skaters. Bourzat said, "Traveling there was not a political act at all. We came as open-minded people, who wanted to discover and exchange."

They dropped to fourth overall after Bourzat tripped and both fell during a step sequence. Following the event, reports surfaced that Péchalat / Bourzat would move to Michigan to train with Anjelika Krylova and Pasquale Camerlengo.

=== 2011–2012 season ===
In May 2011, Péchalat/Bourzat confirmed their move to the Detroit Skating Club in Bloomfield Hills, Michigan for the 2011–2012 season. They said that Camerlengo was the only coach they considered, based on their past experience of working with him during their time as juniors at Lyon, as well as wanting to continue the technique they learned under Zhulin: "[Krylova] is exactly in Zhulin's footsteps as she perpetuates the basics and technique he taught us." The French dancers remained on good terms with Zhulin and Volkov. In Michigan, they trained three hours a day on the ice and then did off-ice training. They lived close to the rink. They also spent time during the summer in Lyon to work with choreographer Kader Belmoktar on their Egypt-themed free dance.

Péchalat/Bourzat took up the new option of competing at three Grand Prix events and were assigned to 2011 Skate America, 2011 Skate Canada, and 2011 Trophee Eric Bompard. Although Bourzat was ill with bronchitis, they were able to win the silver medal at Skate America. They withdrew from Skate Canada due to Bourzat's bronchitis. Their second-place finish at the Trophee Eric Bompard, combined with their showing at Skate America, qualified them for their third straight Grand Prix Final. There, they set a new personal best score in the free dance and won the bronze medal. Their next competition was the French Championships, where they won their third national title.

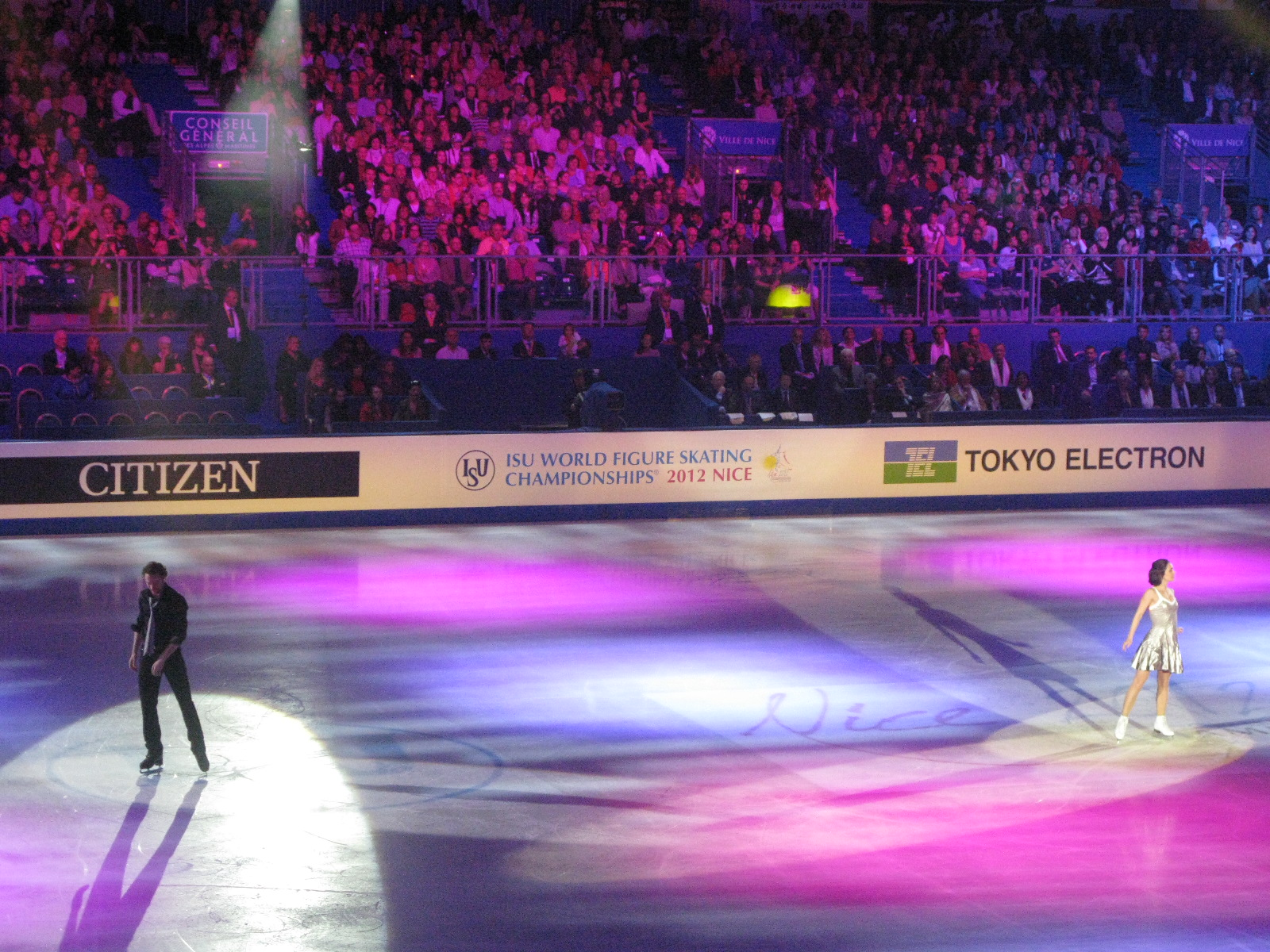
Nathalie and Fabian at 2012 World Championships.

At the 2012 European Championships, Péchalat/Bourzat were second after the short dance, but rallied in the free dance to win their second consecutive European title. Péchalat sustained a broken nose in training on 13 March. She said: "We just made a mistake during our twizzles, and I got knocked out." She began wearing a mask but decided to delay an operation until after the 2012 World Championships. On 25 March, Péchalat/Bourzat confirmed they would compete at the event and said surgery would not be necessary. At the World Championships, they recorded a season's best score in the short dance and a personal best score in the free dance on their way to winning the bronze, their first World medal.

=== 2012–2013 season ===
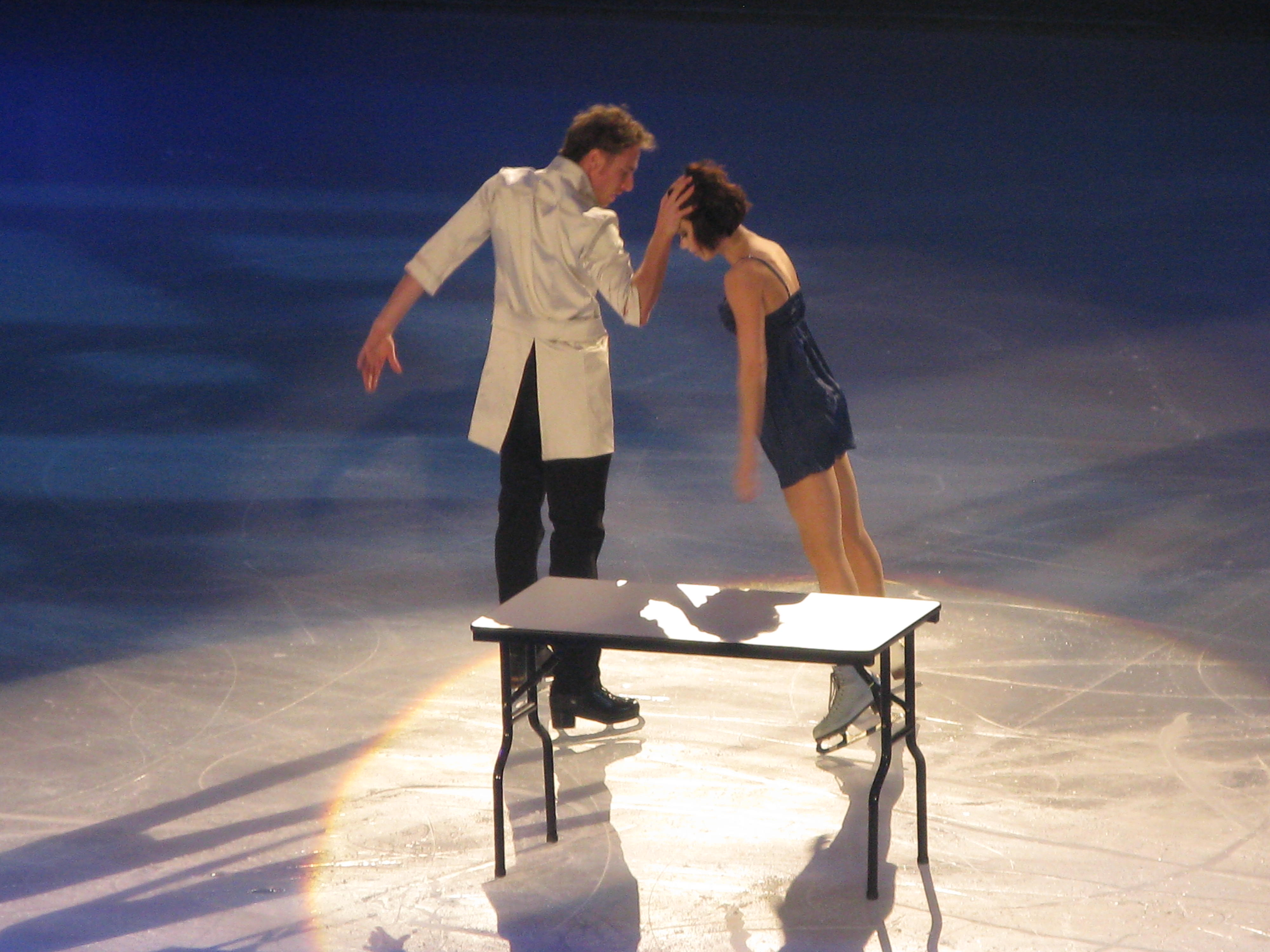
Péchalat at Bompard 2013.

Péchalat/Bourzat won gold at both of their events, the 2012 Cup of China and 2012 Trophee Eric Bompard, and qualified for their fourth Grand Prix Final, where they won bronze. On 9 January 2013, Bourzat sustained a partial tear of the adductor muscle of his right leg, resulting in the team's withdrawal from the 2013 European Championships. Péchalat remained captain of the French team for the event. The duo decided to compete at the 2013 World Championships, motivated in part by the desire to obtain two spots for French ice dancers at the 2014 Olympics. They finished 6th at the event.

On 20 May 2013, at the French skating federation's suggestion, Péchalat/Bourzat announced a coaching change to Igor Shpilband in Novi, Michigan.

=== 2013–2014 season ===
Péchalat/Bourzat won gold at the 2013 Cup of China ahead of Bobrova/Soloviev. They were bronze medalists at the 2013 Trophée Eric Bompard behind Virtue/Moir and Ilinykh/Katsalapov. At the Grand Prix Final in Fukuoka, Japan, the French won the bronze medal, their fifth medal at the event, and then ended 2013 with their fifth national title. They withdrew from the 2014 European Championships to focus on the Olympics.

Péchalat/Bourzat placed fourth at the 2014 Winter Olympics in Sochi, Russia. Although they initially planned to retire right after the Olympics, they ultimately decided to end their competitive career at the 2014 World Championships in Saitama, Japan.

In late 2014 she became a contestant on the fifth season of TF1's Danse avec les Stars.

== Danse avec les stars ==
In 2014, she participated in the fifth season of Danse avec les stars – the French version of Dancing with the Stars. She was firstly partnered with professional dancer Grégoire Lyonnet but after his departure in week 6 for personal reasons, she was so partnered with Christophe Licata. On November 29, 2014, they reached the final, losing to Rayane Bensetti and his partner Denitsa Ikonomova with 48% of the voting.

During 5th week, each contestant change partner for The week and Nathalie got in couple with Maxime Dereymez instead of Grégoire Lyonnet.

Week	Dancing style	Music	Judge points				Total	Ranking	Result
Week	Dancing style	Music	Jean-Marc Généreux	Marie-Claude Pietragalla	M. Pokora	Chris Marques	Total	Ranking	Result
1	Contemporary dance	Chandelier – Sia	8	8	8	8	32/40	2=/11	No eliminations
2	Cha-Cha-Cha	A Sky Full of Stars – Coldplay	8	8	9	7	32/40	2=/11	Safe
1 + 2	Cha-Cha-Cha	A Sky Full of Stars – Coldplay	8	8	9	7	64/80	2=/11	Safe
3	Afro Jazz	Animals – Martin Garrix	9 + 7	8 + 8	9 + 8	7 + 7	63/80	4/10	Safe
4	Rumba	Dis-lui toi que Je t'aime – Vanessa Paradis	9 + 8	9 + 8	9 + 9	8 + 8	68/80	2/9	Safe
5	Quickstep Cha-Cha-Cha Relay (+40 Points)	You Can't Hurry Love – The Supremes Counting Stars – OneRepublic	9 + 9	9 + 9	9 + 9	8 + 9	111/120	1/8	No Eliminations
6	Rumba Dance Marathon (Jive/Flamenco/Country) (+20 points)	La Ceinture – Élodie Frégé Ça (C'est vraiment toi) – Téléphone + Bella – Kendji Girac + Timber – Pitbull Ft Kesha	9 + 9	10 + 9	10 + 9	9 + 8	93/120	4/8	Safe
5 + 6	Rumba Dance Marathon (Jive/Flamenco/Country) (+20 points)	La Ceinture – Élodie Frégé Ça (C'est vraiment toi) – Téléphone + Bella – Kendji Girac + Timber – Pitbull Ft Kesha	9 + 9	10 + 9	10 + 9	9 + 8	204/240	2/8	Safe
7	Tango / Paso Doble Jive (with Rayane Bensetti & Denitsa Ikonomova)	Sweet Dreams – Eurythmics You're the One That I Want – Olivia Newton-John & John Travolta	9 + 9 9	10 + 10 10	10 + 10 9	9 + 9 9	113/120	1/6	Safe
8	American Smooth Salsa	Reality – Richard Sanderson I Like It – The Blackout All-Stars & Tito Nieves	8 + 8 9 + 8	9 + 9 10 + 9	10 + 9 9 + 9	8 + 8 9 + 8	140/160	1/5	Safe
9	Jive (with Christian Millette) Cha-Cha-Cha	Gabrielle – Johnny Hallyday Le Temps qui court – Alain Chamfort	9 + 9 9 + 9	9 + 9 10 + 9	9 + 10 10 + 10	9 + 9 9 + 9	148/160	1/4	Safe
10	American Smooth Samba Megamix (Charleston / Waltz / Jive) Freestyle	It's Oh So Quiet – Björk Don't Leave Me This Way – The Communards All Night – Parov Stelar / Hijo de la Luna – Mecano / C'est comme ça – Les Rita Mitsouko If I Ain't Got You – Alicia Keys	10 + 9 10 + 9 9	10 + 9 10 + 9 8	10 + 10 10 + 10 8	9 + 9 9 + 10 9	187/200	1/3	Runner-up (48%)

== Post-competitive career ==
Since her and Bourzat's retirement following the 2014 World Championships, Péchalat has been very active in the skating community. She has worked as a commentator and figure skating consultant for Eurosport France since 2014, commentating at Grand Prix, Championship, and Olympic events. At the 2018 Winter Olympics, Péchalat attended as a commentator and consultant. Péchalat partnered with French Olympic Team sponsor, L'Or Espresso, to produce videos interacting with Olympic athletes.

In July 2018, Péchalat hosted a training camp for young ice dancers and figure skaters. Ice dancer, Anna Cappellini, and pairs skater, Valentina Marchei, joined her as guest coaches as well as fitness and dance coach, Silvia Notargiacomo.

=== FFSG president ===
In February 2020, scandal engulfed longtime Fédération française des sports de glace (FFSG) president Didier Gailhaguet, who was accused by retired French pair skater Sarah Abitbol of having covered up sexual abuses committed by one of Gailhaguet's longtime allies, Gilles Beyer. Sports Minister Roxana Mărăcineanu demanded Gailhaguet's resignation, which was ultimately given. Péchalat subsequently announced her candidacy to lead the FFSG, and was elected to the position on 14 March 2020 after three rivals withdrew from the race as a result of the coronavirus pandemic.

Péchalat imposed new term limits on service as the federation president, a measure generally perceived as being aimed at preventing a third Gailhaguet tenure in the office. When she sought reelection in the summer of 2022, she was unexpectedly defeated by the largely unknown Gwenaëlle Noury, who was widely seen as being controlled by Gailhaguet.

== Programs ==
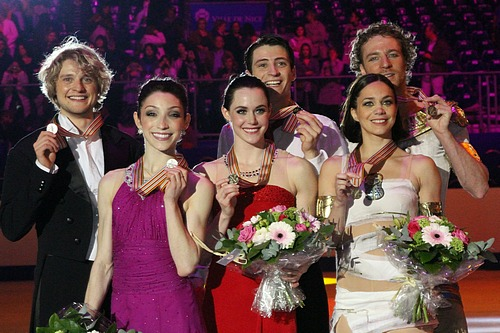
Péchalat/Bourzat during the medal ceremony at the 2012 World Figure Skating Championships

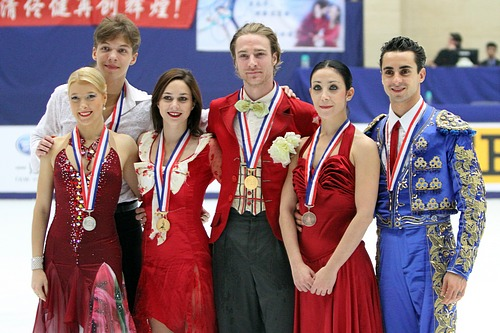
Péchalat/Bourzat after winning their first Grand Prix, the 2010 Cup of China

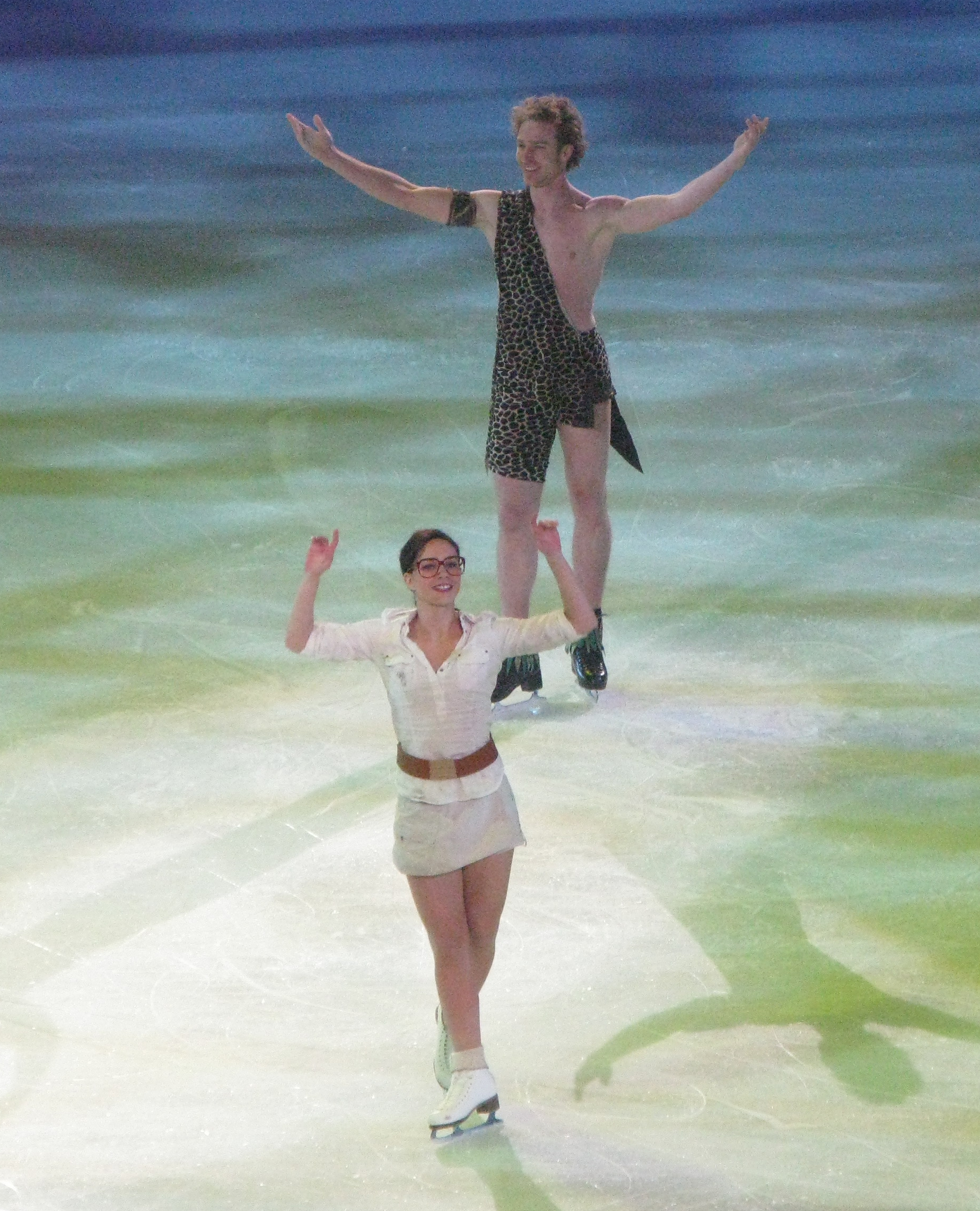
Péchalat/Bourzat at the 2010 Trophée Eric Bompard gala.

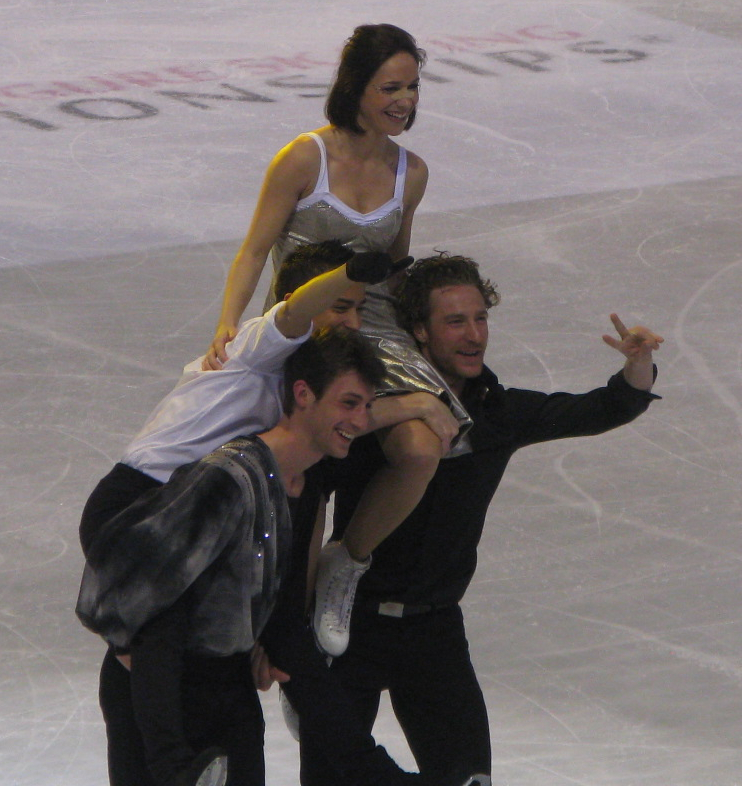
Péchalat/Bourzat with Brian Joubert and Florent Amodio at the 2012 World Figure Skating Championships

(with Bourzat)

Season	Short dance	Free dance	Exhibition
2013–2014	Final version: Slow foxtrot: Roxie (from Chicago) performed by Renée Zellweger; Quickstep: Sing, Sing, Sing by Louis Prima; Charleston: Mein Herr by John Kander choreo. by Laurie M. Ayivigan; Initial version: Slow foxtrot: Big Spender by Cy Coleman, Dorothy Fields; Quickstep: Sing, Sing, Sing by Louis Prima; Charleston: Mein Herr by John Kander choreo. by Laurie M. Ayivigan	"The Little Prince and his rose": Carrousel (from Quidam) by Benoît Jutras; Droit de Cite by Raphael Beaun and Max Steiner; Jeux Interdits by Fernando Sor; Le Petit Prince et sa Rose by Maxime Rodriguez choreo. by Julien Cottereau	Talk to Me; The Time of My Life (from Dirty Dancing); People Are Strange by The Doors; Tous les mêmes by Stromae
2012–2013	Polka: Gaîté Parisienne by Jacques Offenbach; Waltz: Sous le ciel de Paris performed by Yves Montand; Polka: Gaîté Parisienne by Jacques Offenbach	The Rolling Stones medley: Miss You; Angie; Sympathy for the Devil; Start Me Up	People Are Strange by The Doors; Charlie Chaplin medley
2011–2012	"Carnival in Rio": Mas que nada composed by Jorge Ben performed by Sérgio Mendes; Batucada by Abacaxi; Real in Rio by Sérgio Mendes choreo. by Ilia Ifraimov, Pasquale Camerlengo, Anjelika Krylova	"Mummy and Pharaoh": Passion by Peter Gabriel; In The Garden by Narada World; Le retour de Punt by Bernard Becker; Alf Layla Wa Layla by Ahmad Sidqi choreo. by Kader Belmoktar, Pasquale Camerlengo, Anjelika Krylova	The Time of My Life (from Dirty Dancing)
2010–2011	Lara's Theme (from Doctor Zhivago) by Maurice Jarre; Amélie by Yann Tiersen; Fuga y Misterio by Astor Piazzolla choreo. by Antonio Najarro	City Lights medley performed by London Symphony Orchestra choreo. by Alexander Zhulin	George of the Jungle; Chacun pour soi Tenue de soirée by Didier Barbelivien
	Original dance		
2009–2010	American country: Thank God, I'm a Country Boy by Roy Rivers, Dolly Parton; It's not over now by Dale Watson choreo. by Laurie May Ayvignan, P. Narboux	Kika by Ezekiel; Requiem for a Dream by Clint Mansell; Time by Maxime Rodriguez choreo. by Kader Belmoktar; Circus theme: La Notte di Favola by Nicola Piovani; La Marche des Gladiateurs; Jonglage by Maxime Rodriguez choreo. by Julien Cottereau	Circus theme: La Notte di Favola by Nicola Piovani; La Marche des Gladiateurs; Jonglage by Maxime Rodriguez; Andy by Les Rita Mitsouko
2008–2009	Lindy hop: It Don't Mean a Thing by The Puppini Sisters choreo. by Laurie May Ayvignan, S. Olive	Circus theme: La Notte di Favola by Nicola Piovani; La Marche des Gladiateurs; Jonglage by Maxime Rodriguez choreo. by Julien Cottereau	Mummy by Claude Challe; Andy by Les Rita Mitsouko
2007–2008	Spanish flamenco: Le Gitare al viento by Guadiana; Imagen del recuerdo by José Mercé; Blanca de Plata by Guadiana choreo. by Antonio Najarro	Organ Donor by DJ Shadow; Marla; Space Monkeys by Michael Simpson, John King choreo. by Laurie May Ayvignan, Kader Belmoktar	Mummy by Claude Challe
2006–2007	Mi Buenos Aires Querido by Carlos Libendinsky; Escualo by Astor Piazzolla choreo. by Laurie May Ayvignan	Four Seasons by Assen Merzouki choreo. by Mourad Merzouki	La Majorette by Bénabar; Four Seasons by Assen Merzouki choreo. by Mourad Merzouki
2005–2006	Samba: San-A-Samba by René Aubry; Rhumba: And I love Her by Jose Alberto; Salsa: From Chano	Les Misérables (musical) by Claude-Michel Schönberg choreo. by Laurie May Ayvignan	Mon cinema by Claude Nougaro
2004–2005	Slow foxtrot; Charleston; Quickstep	Cats (musical) by Andrew Lloyd Webber choreo. by Romain Haguenauer	Mon cinema by Claude Nougaro
2003–2004	Swing, Brother, Swing by Casey MacGill; If Can't Have You by Etta James; Swing, Brother, Swing by Casey MacGill choreo. by Pasquale Camerlengo	Babalu by Chano; Dance of the Soldiers by Red Army Choir; Hasta Siempre by Soledad Brave; Demasiado Corazon by Willy DeVille choreo. by Romain Haguenauer	
2002–2003	Masquerade by Aram Khachaturian; Tritsch Tratsch Polka by Johann Strauss II	Buddha Bar by Claude Challe; Elveda by Metin Arolat; Asla Vazgecemem by Tarkan version performed by unknown artist choreo. by Romain Haguenauer	
2001–2002	La Historia di un Amor by Claude Challe; Spanish Waltz; La Historia del' Amour by Claude Challe	Buddha Bar by Claude Challe	
2000–2001	The Sea; Katyusha – Midnight in Moscow	El Condor Pasa	

== Competitive highlights ==
=== With Bourzat ===
International
Event	00–01	01–02	02–03	03–04	04–05	05–06	06–07	07–08	08–09	09–10	10–11	11–12	12–13	13–14
Olympics						18th				7th				4th
Worlds				20th	19th	15th	12th	7th	5th	4th	4th	3rd	6th	3rd
Europeans					12th	11th		5th	4th	4th	1st	1st	WD	
Grand Prix Final								6th		3rd	2nd	3rd	3rd	3rd
GP Bompard			9th	8th	8th	5th	7th			2nd	1st	2nd	1st	3rd
GP Cup of China				7th	7th						1st		1st	1st
GP Cup of Russia						5th		2nd						
GP NHK Trophy									2nd					
GP Skate America							3rd	2nd				2nd		
GP Skate Canada			11th						3rd	2nd		WD		
Finlandia											1st			
Nebelhorn											1st			
Universiade			3rd		3rd									
International: Junior
Junior Worlds	8th	6th												
JGP Final		7th												
JGP China	2nd													
JGP France	6th													
JGP Japan		2nd												
JGP Netherlands		4th												
National
French Champ.	1st J.	1st J.	3rd	3rd	2nd	2nd	2nd		1st		1st	1st	1st	1st
Masters	1st J.	1st J.	2nd	3rd	1st	2nd		2nd	2nd	1st	1st			
Team events
Olympics														6th T (4th P)
WTT												4th T (3rd P)		
GP = Grand Prix; JGP = Junior Grand Prix; J. = Junior level; WD = Withdrew; T = Team result; P = Personal result; Medals awarded for team result only.

=== Earlier partnerships ===
(with Zenezini)

Event	1999–2000
JGP Norway	6th
JGP = Junior Grand Prix

(with Deheinzelen)

Event	1997–98	1998–99
JGP Hungary		5th
JGP Ukraine	12th	8th
JGP Slovakia	11th	
JGP = Junior Grand Prix
