= Masquelier =

Masquelier may refer to:

- Adeline Masquelier (born 1960), Associate Professor of Anthropology at Tulane University in New Orleans, Louisiana
- Prosper Masquelier (born 1981), French poker player and businessman
