= Tonya Kinzinger =

American dancer, model and actress (born 1968)

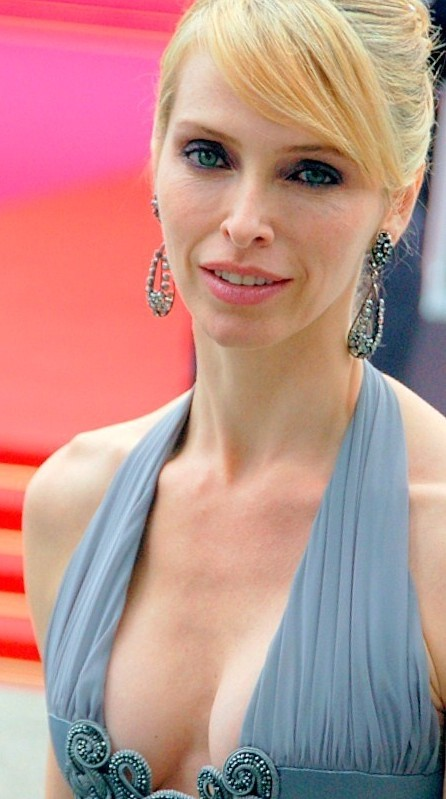
- Tonya Kinzinger at the Cannes festival
- Born: 20 June 1968 (age 58); Monroe, Michigan, U.S.
- Occupations: Dance, model, actress
- Years active: 1990–present
- Spouse: Bernard Lignon (m. 1998)
- Children: 1

Tonya Kinzinger is an American dancer, model and actress who has attained fame in France.

== Biography ==
Kinzinger was born on 20 June 1968 in Monroe, Michigan. She began dancing at three years old, when her mother enrolled her in tap dancing lessons, and became passionate about ballet dancing at the age of six. Several years later, she left Michigan to study at a well known dance school in New York. Scouted by a photographer, Kinzinger joined a modelling agency and worked as a model in Paris. She returned to the US to finish high school before moving to France to pursue a career in acting.

She appeared in the film Dancing Machine with Alain Delon. She then played Jessica in the TV series Sous le soleil (Under the Sun), from 1996 to 2008, for which she is best known in France. In 2006, she appeared in two episodes of the series The Bold and the Beautiful in Los Angeles. In 2007, she also launched a fashion collection called "Tonya - K." in collaboration with Christophe Lebo. She played Sally in the movie Fool Moon, directed by Jérôme L'Hotsky, which was filmed in Britain in July and August 2007. Kinzinger acted in Dreams, a series broadcast on the French television network NRJ 12. In 2011, after meeting Stéphane Slima on the set of Sous le soleil, she acted in the play Le Président, sa femme et moi. (The President, His Wife, and Me). In 2012, she hosted season 9 of Star Academy on the NRJ 12 network. In 2014, she was a contestant on Danse avec les stars 5 and reached the semifinals.

Kinzinger married Bernard Lignon on 27 December 1998. They have one son Sacha, born in 2003.

== Filmography ==
Year	Title	Role	Director	Notes
1990	Dancing Machine	Daphné	Gilles Béhat	
1991	Les dessous de la passion	Terry	Jean Marboeuf	TV movie
1992	Les danseurs du Mozambique	Elise	Philippe Lefebvre	TV movie
1992	Nestor Burma	Jennifer Corbin	Joyce Buñuel	TV series (1 episode)
1994	Highlander: The Series	Juliette	Dennis Berry	TV series (1 episode)
1994	Placé en garde à vue		Marco Pauly	TV series (1 episode)
1994-99	Extrême limite	Cathie	Bernard Dubois, Laurent Levy, ...	TV series (54 episodes)
1996-2008	Sous le soleil	Jessica Lowry	Eric Summer, Sylvie Ayme, ...	TV series (345 episodes)
1998	Tatoo	The fiancée	Grégori Baquet	Short
2001	Dark Realm	Rebecca	Eric Summer (2)	TV series (1 episode)
2003	Largo Winch	Rosalind Campbell	Paolo Barzman	TV series (1 episode)
2007	The Bold and the Beautiful	Yvette St. Julienne	Deveney Kelly & Cynthia J. Popp	TV series (3 episodes)
2008	Fool Moon	Nina	Jérôme L'hotsky	
2009	Presque célèbre	Cassandra Brown	Jean-Marc Thérin	TV movie
2010	L'été où tout a basculé	Maude	Olivier Jamain	TV series (1 episode)
2011	Camping paradis	Virginie	Eric Duret	TV series (1 episode)
2012	Bienvenue aux acteurs anonymes	Herself	Mathias Gomis	Short
2014	Griot's Lament	Kat	Alex Munoz	Short
2014	Dreams : 1 Rêve 2 Vies	Amanda	Jon Carnoy & Dan Occo	TV series (1 episode)
2016	A Sunday Horse	Mrs. Dumar	Vic Armstrong	
2017	Do You Know the Way to San Jose	Iris	Alex Munoz (2)	
2019-present	Un si grand soleil	Dr. Janet Lewis		TV series, Main role
