= Nice People (TV France) =

Nice People was a French reality television show presented by Flavie Flament (daily) and Arthur (specials) and broadcast on TF1 from 26 April 2003 to 5 July 2003. The show was produced by So Nice Production and Endemol.

== Principle ==
The show, inspired by the film L'Auberge Espagnole, put 12 young people representing different European countries in a luxurious villa in the Cote d'Azur in Nice to live for two and a half months. Much as in Loft Story, the French version of Big Brother, broadcast on M6 in 2001 and 2002, these young people were filmed 24 hours and eliminated progressively by the public. Each week, one or two celebrities also visited and stayed a few days with the contestants. The celebrities also joined the contestants in voting whom to evict each week. The winner was Serena Reinaldi.

== Candidates ==
Housemates	Residence	Occupation	Age
(Finland) Antti Timonen		Student	27
(United Kingdom) Eleanor Legge-Bourke		Public relations executive	22
(Russia) Elena Lenina		TV presenter	27
(Portugal) Helder Silva		Clerk	23
(Poland) Karolina Bomba-Petrajtis		Musician	24
(Germany) Katrin Jeckstat		Student	21
(Belgium) Michaël Darchambeau		Student	22
(Sweden) Nallé Grinda		Tennis player	27
(France) Prosper Masquelier		Comedian	22
(Italy) Raimondo Palermo		Financial adviser	29
(Spain) Raquel Morcillo		Receptionist	24
(Italy) Serena Reinaldi		Art student	25

== Nominations ==
	Week 1	Week 2	Week 3	Week 4	Week 5	Week 6	Week 7	Week 8	Week 10
Serena	Raquel, Antti	Prosper, Elena	Prosper, Antti	Nallé, Katrin	Katrin, Eleanor	Nallé, Katrin	Michael, Helder, Katrin	No nominations	Winner (Day 70)
Helder	Elena, Nallé	Prosper, Elena	Prosper, Antti	Prosper, Eleanor	Karolina, Nallé	Katrin, Eleanor	Serena, Eleanor, Katrin	No nominations	Runner-Up (Day 70)
Katrin	Karolina, Elena	Prosper, Elena	Prosper, Helder	Prosper, Nallé	Karolina, Serena	Michael, Nallé	Helder, Michael, Eleanor	No nominations	Evicted (Day 63)
Raimondo	Serena, Raquel	Prosper, Elena	Prosper, Antti	Prosper, Eleanor	Karolina, Nallé	Eleanor, Nallé	Serena, Eleanor, Katrin	No nominations	Evicted (Day 63)
Eleanor	Helder, Katrin	Katrin, Nallé	Helder, Nallé	Helder, Nallé	Karolina, Raimondo	Michael, Helder	Raimondo, Michael, Helder	Evicted (Day 49)	
Michael	Karolina, Nallé	Prosper, Elena	Prosper, Antti	Prosper, Eleanor	Karolina, Nallé	Eleanor, Nallé	Serena, Eleanor, Katrin	Evicted (Day 49)	
Nallé	Helder, Elena	Helder, Elena	Prosper, Michael	Prosper, Helder	Katrin, Helder	Raimondo, Katrin	Evicted (Day 42)		
Karolina	Raquel, Katrin	Prosper, Elena	Prosper, Helder	Helder, Prosper	Helder, Katrin	Evicted (Day 35)			
Prosper	Katrin, Raquel	Raimondo, Katrin	Michael, Nallé	Karolina, Nallé	Evicted (Day 28)				
Antti	Karolina, Prosper	Elena, Karolina	Prosper, Nallé	Evicted (Day 21)					
Elena	Raquel, Katrin	Antti, Katrin	Evicted (Day 14)						
Raquel	Michael, Elena	Evicted (Day 7)							
Celebrity Guest	Ophélie Winter	Doc Gynéco	Christophe Dechavanne	Les Models	Gilbert Montagné	Brahim Asloum	Smaïn	Francis Lalanne	None
Celebrity Guest	Ophélie Winter	Doc Gynéco	Christophe Dechavanne	Jean-Pascal Lacoste	Mareva Galanter	Sophie Favier	Smaïn	Irina (Helder's girlfriend)	None
Guest Nominations	Katrin, Raquel	Helder, Elena	Refused	Raimondo, Serena	Helder, Karolina	Katrin, Helder	Raimondo, Michael, Eleanor	No nominations	None
Guest Nominations	Katrin, Raquel	Helder, Elena	Refused	Prosper, Eleanor	Helder, Karolina	Nallé, Katrin	Raimondo, Michael, Eleanor	No nominations	None
Nominated	Raquel; Katrin	Prosper; Elena	Antti; Prosper	Prosper; Nallé; Eleanor	Helder; Karolina	Katrin; Nallé	Eleanor; Katrin; Michael	Serena; Raimondo; Helder; Katrin	Serena; Helder
Evicted	Raquel; 37% to save	Elena; 41% to save	Antti; 45% to save	Prosper; 30% to save	Karolina; 45% to save	Nallé; 36% to save	Eleanor; 35% to save	Raimondo ??% to save	Helder; 22% to win
Evicted	Raquel; 37% to save	Elena; 41% to save	Antti; 45% to save	Prosper; 30% to save	Karolina; 45% to save	Nallé; 36% to save	Michel; 21% to save	Katrin ??% to save	Serena; 78% to win

== Hearings ==
Day	Broadcast schedule	Audience	Share
Saturday	3 May 2003 to 20:50	6.900.000	34,9%
Saturday	10 May 2003 to 22:40	4.400.000	21,9%
Saturday	17 May 2003 to 22:20	5.000.000	-
Saturday	24 May 2003 to 22:10	5.500.000	-
Saturday	31 May 2003 to 22:10	4.000.000	-
Saturday	7 June 2003 to 22:10	3.950.000	27%
Saturday	14 June 2003 to 22:10	-	-
Saturday	21 June 2003 to 22:10	-	-
Saturday	28 June 2003 to 22:10	-	-
Saturday	5 July 2003 to 22:10	4.310.000	29,5%
