= Agathe Cléry =

- Directed by: Etienne Chatiliez
- Written by: Etienne Chatiliez; Laurent Chouchan
- Produced by: Charles Gassot
- Starring: Valérie Lemercier; Anthony Kavanagh; Dominique Lavanant; Isabelle Nanty
- Cinematography: Philippe Welt
- Edited by: Catherine Renault
- Music by: Bruno Coulais; Matthew Herbert
- Distributed by: Pathé
- Release date: December 3, 2008
- Running time: 113 minutes
- Country: France
- Language: French
- Budget: $25.4 million
- Box office: $10 million

Agathe Cléry is a 2008 French comedy film directed and co-written by Etienne Chatiliez, with co-writer Laurent Chouchan.

== Plot ==
Agathe Cléry is a marketing manager for a line of cosmetics for people with pale skin. She is also racist, particularly towards black people. However, she is diagnosed with Addison's disease, which turns her skin dark. The film follows her struggles as a black person dealing with discrimination against her due to her skin colour.

== Cast ==
- Valérie Lemercier - Agathe Cléry
- Anthony Kavanagh - Quentin Lambert
- Dominique Lavanant - Mimie
- Isabelle Nanty - Joëlle
- Jacques Boudet - Roland
- Artus de Penguern - Hervé
- Jean Rochefort - Louis Guignard
- Bernard Alane - Philippe Guignard
- Nadège Beausson-Diagne - Nathalie
- François Duval - Loïc Guignard
- Valentine Valera - Nathalie
- Élise Otzenberger - Lucie
- Claire Pataut - Alice
- Virginie Raccosta - Delphine
- Andy Cocq - Cédric
- Julie Ferrier - The Cop
