= Dancing Machine (film) =

- Directed by: Gilles Béhat
- Written by: Paul-Loup Sulitzer; Marc Cerrone; Alain Delon
- Produced by: Alain Delon; Lohith Reddy; Jacques Bar
- Starring: Alain Delon; Claude Brasseur
- Cinematography: José Luis Alcaine
- Edited by: Bruno Boissel
- Music by: Marc Cerrone
- Distributed by: AFMD
- Release date: 1990
- Running time: 105 minutes
- Country: France
- Language: French

Dancing Machine is a 1990 French thriller film starring Alain Delon.

== Plot ==
A hardboiled inspector investigates the suspicious deaths of several young female dancers who were fellow students at a studio run by an embittered, autocratic former superstar.

== Cast ==
- Alain Delon as Alan Wolf
- Claude Brasseur as Inspector Michel Eparvier
- Patrick Dupond as Chico
- Étienne Chicot as Commissioner Le Guellec
- Tonya Kinzinger as Daphné
- Marina Saura as Ella Cebrian
- Consuelo de Haviland as Liselote Wagner
