= Anthony Kavanagh =

Haitian-Canadian entertainer

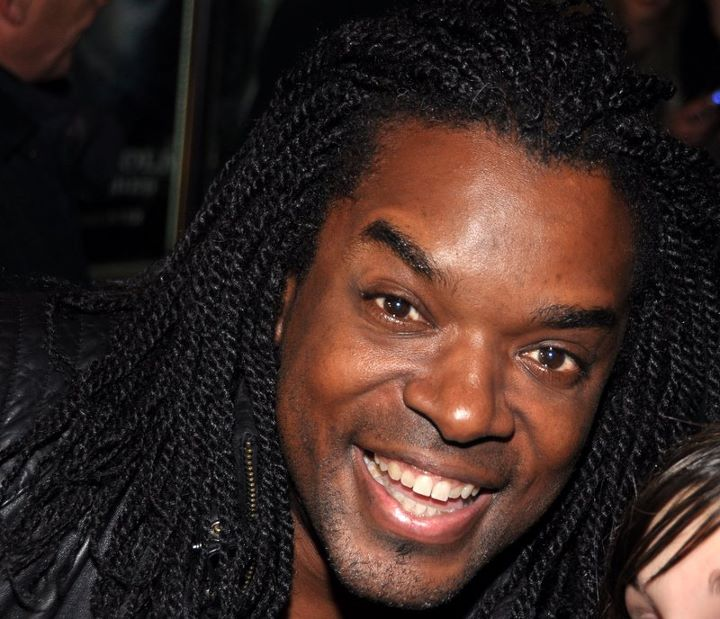
- Kavanagh in 2012
- Born: September 26, 1969 (age 57); Greenfield Park (Longueuil), Québec
- Spouse: Alexandra Kavanagh
- Children: 2

Comedy career
- Years active: 1992-present

Anthony Kavanagh (born September 26, 1969) is a Canadian stand-up comedian, actor, singer and TV presenter. After a successful career on the francophone stand-up scene in Quebec, he became a major star in France and is now a popular television host.

== Early life ==
Anthony Kavanagh was born to Haitian parents on September 26, 1969. He made his stage début in a high school talent show at the age of 14. In 1989, he won the Best New Comic Award of the Juste pour rire Festival ("Just for Laughs") in Montreal. This award propelled him onto the Quebec show business scene. Kavanagh charmed English and French speaking audiences alike. In 1992, Kavanagh opened for touring artists such as Julio Iglesias and Natalie Cole and spent two years as Céline Dion's opening act across Canada, in French and in English.

Kavanagh got his own television talk show in 1993 "...et Anthony", becoming the youngest talk show host in Quebec at age 23. He co-starred on the French Canadian comedy radio show Les Midis fous on CKOI (No.1 in their time slot), then in a recurring role on the television series Super sans plomb and a starring role in the made-for-TV movie "Voodoo Taxi" for Canadian Broadcasting Corporation (CBC).

== Career ==
=== Stand-up comedy ===
Kavanagh presented his first stand-up comedy show, "Kavanagh!" across Quebec in 1995. The one-man show was a success and garnered rave reviews. That same year, he received the Outstanding New Talent award at the Montreux Comedy Festival in Switzerland. In December, Kavanagh once again opened for Celine Dion in Paris at the Paris-Bercy and Zenith arenas.

In 1998, after taking a year to adapt and prepare his show "Kavanagh!" for France with famous French comedian Pascal Légitimus, Kavanagh debuted in Lyon right in the middle of the FIFA World Cup. Nevertheless, the show drew sold-out crowds, even turning away more than 150 people a day. In the fall, he took up residence at Theâtre Trévise in Paris for seven months to sold-out audiences. After less than one year in France, Kavanagh was asked to do four shows at the Olympia, the most prestigious theater in France. After 5 years, in 2003, his Kavanagh! Tour ended after 500 shows in 7 countries and 250,000 DVDs sold.

In 2008, after a five-year break from stand-up comedy, Kavanagh returned to the comedy stage with a new one-man show "Anthonykavanagh.com" touring in Canada, France and Switzerland. The following year, he returned to Théâtre du Gymnase with another new comedy show called "Ouate Else". Kavanagh took this show on tour across France and Switzerland in 2010.

Kavanagh has since performed the one-man show "Anthony Kavanagh fait son coming out" at Bobino Theater in Paris and is on tour throughout France and the French-speaking world.

Every year, since 2010, Kavanagh has hosted the "Grand Gala at the Festival Grand Rire de Québec", a Quebec comedy festival which airs on Radio-Canada.

=== Acting career ===
Following in the footsteps of Richard Gere on film and Usher on Broadway, Kavanagh was chosen in 2003 to play lawyer Billy Flynn in the French version of the musical comedy Chicago in Montreal and Paris.

In 1998, Kavanagh voiced the character Mushu for the French-Canadian dub of the Disney animated film Mulan. He also provided voice work in French for Home on the Range (2004) by Disney: Buck (French voice); Madagascar 1 (2005), 2 (2008) & 3 (2012) by DreamWorks: Marty the zebra (French and French-Canadian voice); Happy Feet 1 (2006) and 2 (2011) by Warner Bros: Memphis and Lovelace (French voice); The Princess and the Frog by Disney (2010): Ray (French and French Canadian voice).

In 2006, Kavanagh launched the show "Les démons de l'Arkange" accompanied by the album by the same name. The show was a musical, a concert, and standup comedy show all rolled into one. The show debuted at the Grand Rex in Paris, and then moved to Théâtre des Variétés.

French filmmaker Étienne Chatiliez gave him the leading male role in his 2008 film "Agathe Clery" in which he played Quentin Lambert, a French businessman.

Kavanagh played American GI Gary Larochelle in the Philippe Niang made-for-TV movie "Les amants de l'ombre" in 2009. It was a huge hit, attracting over four million viewers.

Kavanagh took a supporting role in the mini-series "La Fille au Fond du Verre à Saké" by Emmanuel Sapolsky, which aired on Canal Plus in 2009, playing a gay French-Canadian car designer living in Paris.

This year for the new season of "Fais pas ci, fais pas ça", (French hit TV series), Kavanagh guest starred as the new neighbour, sports agent Chris Lenoir.

=== Television ===
Since 2001, TF1, the biggest television network in Europe and the most popular in France, has invited him to MC the "NRJ Music Awards" (equivalent to the MTV Music Awards) six years in a row welcoming major French and international stars like David Guetta, Beyoncé, Jay-Z, Britney Spears, U2, Black Eyed Peas, Usher, Coldplay, Madonna.

In 2006, Kavanagh hosted numerous primetime French TV shows on France 2 television network – "The Dancing Show", "Fête de la Musique" and the "Symphonic Show" and the renowned «Night of Proms» orchestra.

Kavanagh also returned to television in 2010 as host of a show he co-wrote and co-produced called "Nous avons les images", broadcast on Comédie Channel in France and Super Écran in Canada.

In 2014, he participated in the fifth season of Danse avec les stars – the French version of Dancing with the Stars. He was partnered with professional dancer Silvia Notargiacomo. On November 1, 2014, they were eliminated finishing 7th out of 11 contestants.

== Various shows ==
- 2010 : Anthony Kavanagh fait son coming out
- 2009 : Ouate Else
- 2008 : Anthonykavanagh.com
- 2006 : Les Démons de L'Arkange
- 2003 : Chicago, the musical - Billy Flynn
- 1995-99 : Kavanagh !

== Filmography ==
- 1998 - Mulan - Mushu (Quebec voice)
- 2000 - Antilles sur Seine
- 2004 - Home on the Range - Buck (French voice)
- 2005 - Madagascar - Marty le zèbre (French voice)
- 2008 - Madagascar 2 - Marty le zèbre (French voice)
- 2008 - Agathe Cléry - Quentin Lambert
- 2010 - The Princess and the Frog : Ray (French and Quebec voices)
- 2016 - Moana : Maui (French and Quebec voice)
- 2019 - Aladdin : Genie (French and Quebec voice)
- 2021 - Fatherhood - ER doctor
- 2024 - Moana 2 : Maui (French and Quebec voice)
- 2026 - Lydia and the Mist Rider (Lydia et le vaisseau des tempêtes)

== Television ==
=== Movies ===
- 2011 : Fais pas ci, fais pas ça - Chris Lenoir
- 2011 : Oggy et les cafards (voices)
- 2009 : Les Amants de l'ombre - Gary Larochelle
- 2008 : La Fille au fond du verre à saké - Maxime Leroy
- 2005 : Le cœur a ses raisons - Brock Steel
- 1989 - 1991 : Super sans plomb
- 1991 : Voodoo Taxi

=== Shows ===
- 2010 : Nous avons les images on Comédie channel !
- 2006 : Shymphonic Show on France 2.
- 2006 : Dancing Show on France 2.
- 2001 à 2006 : NRJ Music Award

== Radio ==
- 1994 : Midis Fous de CKOI, on CKOI-FM

== Video games ==
- 2011 : Skylanders: Spyro's Adventure - Kaos (Quebec French)
- 2012 : Skylanders: Giants - Kaos (Quebec French)

== See also ==
- List of Quebec comedians
- Culture of Quebec
