= Splash: Le Grand Plongeon =

Splash: Le Grand Plongeon is a French reality television series based on the international series Celebrity Splash! and broadcast on TF1. Only one series was aired.

Season 1 debuted on 8 February 2013 and was hosted by Estelle Denis accompanied by Julie Taton and Gérard Vives with judges Grégory Couratier, Muriel Hermine, Taïg Khris and Laure Manaudou. The trainers were Fanny Aron, Aurélien Bonnaud, Alexis Coquet, Audrey Labeau, Hassan Mouti and Cyrille Oumedjkane. The title was won by swimmer Clément Lefert with rugby player Christian Califano runner-up and handball player Jackson Richardson third.

Although TF1 announced a second season, this never materialized.

Contestant	Known For	Rank
Clément Lefert	Olympic Gold Medalist in Swimming	Winner
Christian Califano	Former Rugby Player	2nd
Jackson Richardson	French Men's Handball Team Captain	3rd
Laury Thilleman	Miss France 2011	4th
Nadège Lacroix	Actress & Winner of Secret Story 6	5th
Keen'V	Singer	6th
Christophe Beaugrand	Journalist & Animator on TF1 and NT1	7th
Gégé	Koh-Lanta 11 Contestant	8th
Jennifer Lauret	Julie Lescaut & A Wonderful Family Actress	9th
Golan Yosef	Musical Theatre Actor	10th
Katrina Patchett	Dancing with the Stars Professional Dancer	11th
Jean-Pascal Lacoste	Singer, Actor, TV Host, Star Academy 1 Contestant	12th
Jean-Luc Lahaye	Singer & TV Host	13th
Sheryfa Luna	Popstars Winner	14th
Danièle Évenou	Comedienne	15th
Ève Angeli	Singer	16th
