= Prosper Masquelier =

French businessman, television producer, actor and entrepreneur (born 1981)

- Born: 18 March 1981 (age 45); Montpellier, France
- Occupations: Businessman; Television producer Actor; Entrepreneur.

Prosper Masquelier (born 19 March 1981 in Montpellier) is a French businessman, television producer, actor and entrepreneur, and creator of the first French television series about poker, Le Tournoi des As (or Tournament of Aces), and the French online gambling website PokerXtrem.fr.

== Background ==
Masquelier is the son of Jean and Marlene Masquelier. Marlene, his mother, is owner of Brasserie du Théâtre de Montpellier and a member of the Partouche family, operators of French casinos. Jean, his father, heads the casinos Palavas-les-Flots and La Grande-Motte for the Partouche group.

In September 2001, Prosper Masquelier entered the French drama school Cours Florent to study acting. and during the summer of 2002, he worked for Palavas-les-Flots, prior to his joining the show Nice People in 2003.

== Career ==
In 2003, Masquelier participated as French representative in the reality show Nice People, produced by So Nice Productions and Endemol, and broadcast on the TF1 channel from 26 April to 5 July 2003. The idea of the show was to place twelve young people from different European countries in a "luxurious" villa on the French Riviera and to film them round the clock.

Following Nice People, Masquelier started the company 'Sogimage Productions', to feature previous participants of various reality TV programs as guests at concerts sponsored by Orange and organized in French Overseas Departments and Territories.

In 2004, Prosper Masquelier created the first French television series dedicated to poker, the Tournament, broadcast for four years on the Paris Première channel. The show's concept was to invite celebrities to the same poker table. Tournament of Aces broadcast about fifteen shows each year from 2004 till 2008.

In 2006, Masquelier joined the Partouche Group and headed the subsidiary Partouche Interactive from 2006 till 2009. In 2008, he launched Charity Poker Festival as a poker tournament to bring together Hollywood celebrities. Those participating have included Salma Hayek, Edward Norton, Adrien Brody, and Dennis Hopper.

In 2010, Masquelier left Partouche and joined with Georges Djen, Managing editor of Live Poker, the first French poker magazine, to create 'Full Fun Company'. Building upon French legislation authorizing online gambling, the company submitted an application for a license to operate an online poker website. On 26 July 2010 Full Fun was granted a license from the French on-line gaming regulatory authority, ARJEL, and was allowed to create and operate the website pokerxtrem.fr. The website has been operational since October 2010.

At the end of 2010, Masquelier joined with together with Laurent and Bernard Tapie to create 'ISPT Production Company' as the biggest poker tournament on a global scale, organized exclusively in football stadiums.

2024 November 1, Prosper MASQUELIER becomes the PDG of the Pasino Grand La Tour De Salvagny near LYON

=== Filmography ===
- Nice People (2003)
- La Méthode Cauet (The Cauet Method) (1 episode, 2005)

Television producer

- Le Tournoi des As (Tournament of Aces) (2005)
- Game of the Century (2007)
- Charity Poker Festival (2008)
