= Jean-Pascal Lacoste =

French television personality (born 1978)

Jean-Pascal
- Born: Jean-Pascal Lacoste; 21 June 1978 (age 48); Toulouse, France
- Occupations: TV personality; presenter; former singer; former actor
- Years active: 2001–present
- Known for: Star Academy 1
- Television: Star Academy; Nice People; Section de recherches; Splash: Le Grand Plongeon

Jean-Pascal Lacoste (also known as Jean-Pascal or Jipé; born 21 June 1978) is a French television personality, TV host and former singer and actor.

== Career ==
In 2001, he participated in the first edition of French TV reality show Star Academy, but was eliminated on 5 January 2002. He was semi-finalist and participated in the Star Academy Tour. He remained famous for his quarrels with Jenifer Bartoli.

After his participation, he released his singles "L'Agitateur" (#2 in France, #1 in Belgium) and "Rue de la liberté" (#13 in France, #3 in Belgium) and his debut album Jean-Pascal, qui es-tu ? (#7 in France, #1 in Belgium).

In June 2002, he became a TV host in a sport program Tous ensemble, then in a Incroyable mais vrai !, along with Bruno Roblès, Roger Pierre et Sophie Favier, on TF1.

In 2006, he started a career as actor in the police series Section de recherches.

In January 2007, he participated in the "Grand Concours des Animateurs", hosted by Carole Rousseau.

In 2008, he has hosted various TV shows on NRJ 12.

== Personal life ==
He married Jennifer Jacobs in early 2007 and became Kylie's father on 29 March 2008. In 2014, Jean-Pascal and Jennifer divorced.

== Discography ==
=== Albums ===
- 2002 : Jean-Pascal, qui es-tu ? – #1 in Belgium, #7 in France, #61 in Switzerland
- 2003 : Plein sud – #12 in Belgium, #42 in France

=== Singles ===
- 2002 : "L'Agitateur" – #1 in Belgium, #2 in France
- 2002 : "Rue de la liberté" – #3 in Belgium, #13 in France
- 2002 : "La chanson con" – #22 in Belgium, #17 in France

== Filmography ==
=== Contestant ===
Year	Title	Television channel	Notes
2001	Star Academy 1	TF1	
2003	Nice People	TF1	
2004	Fear Factor	TF1	
2004–2007	Le Grand Concours des animateurs	TF1	3 episodes
2006	Le Grand show de la glace	TF1	
2010	Attention à la marche !	TF1	
2013	Splash: Le Grand Plongeon	TF1	
2015	Fort Boyard	France 2	
2016	Un dîner presque parfait	W9	
2018	Vous avez un colis	6ter	
2018	Perdus au milieu de nulle part	W9	
2018	Strike	C8	

=== TV Series actor ===
Year	Title	Role	Director	Notes
2003	Le Bleu de l'océan	José Ferrera		TV mini-series (2 episodes)
2009	Père et maire	Nic	Pascal Heylbroeck	TV series (1 Episode : "Père et maire")
2013	Camping paradis	Jean-Pat	Bruno Garcia	TV series (1 Episode : "Indiana Camping")
2006–2014	Section de recherches	Luc	Several directors	TV series (76 episodes)
