= Marie-Claude Pietragalla =

French dancer and choreographer (born 1963)

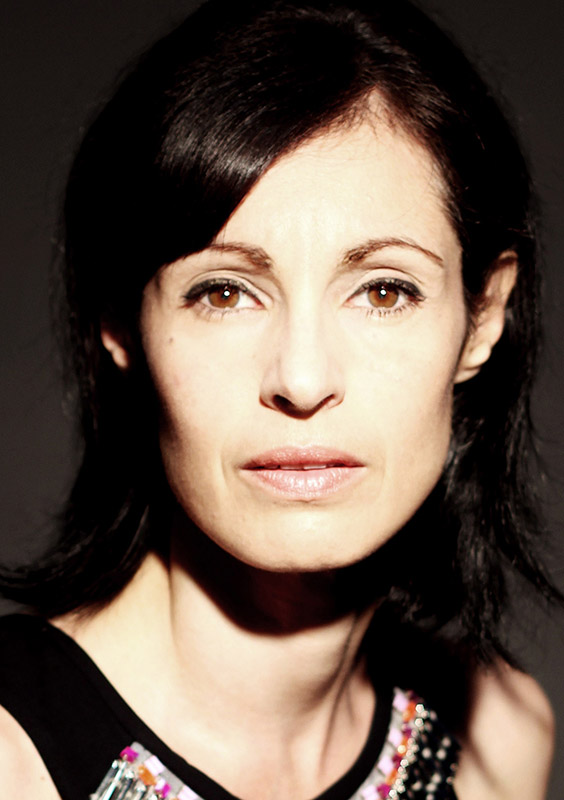
- Marie-Claude Pietragalla
- Born: Marie-Claude Georgette Yvonne Pietragalla; 2 February 1963 (age 63); Paris, France
- Occupations: Dancer, choreographer
- Years active: 1979–present
- Spouse: Julien Derouault

Marie-Claude Georgette Yvonne Pietragalla (born 2 February 1963 in Paris) is a French dancer and choreographer.

== Biography ==
Pietragalla was born in Paris to a Corsican father and mother from Bordeaux. At 16, she joined the Ballet de l'Opera National de Paris and was named étoile on 22 December 1990 after the performance of Don Quixote in which she played the role of Kitri. In 1998, she was appointed to the leadership of the National Ballet of Marseille, where she remained five years. After a protracted conflict with the company's dancers and staff, she stepped down from her position.

She danced at the Opéra Bastille with Patrick Dupond the "Swan Lake" (1992) and "Les Variations d'Ulysse" (1995) under the direction of Jean-Claude Gallotta. In 1998 she received the Prix Benois de la Danse. In 2000 she appeared in a one-woman show "Don't look back", a solo performance created for her by Carolyn Carlson. In October that year she introduced the ballet Sakountala that evokes the internal struggle of the sculptor Camille Claudel with her own demons.

In 2002 she choreographed the show "Enzo", a duo created for the show at the Olympia of Christophe (Victoire de la Musique 2002).

In 2003 she choreographed the show "Metamorphoses" for the dance school of Marseille. The same year she also choreographed "Ni Dieu ni maître", a show about anarchist poet and singer-songwriter Léo Ferré, which was presented first at the Théatre Toursky in Marseille, then at the Olympia in Paris. The show was about music and songs by Léo Ferré (and Elizabeth Cooper). She signed a new version of "Don Quixote" (Minkus-Cooper).

Since 2004 she has run her own company, the Pietragalla Company. In 2006 she presented a show called "Conditions humaines". In 2007 she began her second year of residency at the Nord-Pas-de-Calais and under the direction of Pierre Cardin created the dance-drama "Sade ou le théâtre des fous". Presented first at the castle of Lacoste in July 2007, this ballet was also given in February 2008 at the Espace Pierre Cardin in Paris. In March 2009 she presented the show "Marco Polo" at the Palais des Congrès in Paris.

== Personal life ==
She is married to the dancer Julien Derouault. In 2011 she reappeared alone on the stage of the Palace with his new creation, "The temptation of Eve", which was originally scheduled to run from 25 January-12 February 2011 but was extended until 12 March, after which she went on a tour in France and Switzerland. She is currently a judge on Danse avec les Stars, the French version of Dancing with the Stars.

== Bibliography ==
=== Works of Marie-Claude Pietragalla ===
- Corps et âme, Paris, Somogy, 1999
- La Légende de la danse, Paris, Flammarion, 1999
- Écrire la danse : de Ronsard à Antonin Artaud, Paris, Atlantica, 2001
- La Femme qui danse with Dominique Simonnet, Paris, Seuil, 2008

=== Book on Marie-Claude Pietragalla ===
- Pietragalla, Bernard Raffali text, photographs by Claude Alexander, Arles, Actes Sud, 1996

== Filmography ==
- Sahara, Pietra (voice)
- Mongeville (TV Series), Letizia Jacomino
- Livid, Jessel
- Quand je vois le soleil, Jacques Cortal, 2003. Marie-Claude Pietragalla, Florent Pagny, Francois Cluzet and Sophie Broustal.
- Le lac des cygnes (TV Movie), Odette/Odile
