= List of number-one singles of 2000 (France) =

This is a list of the French SNEP Top 100 Singles and Top 75 Albums number-ones of 2000.

== Number-ones by week ==
=== Singles Chart ===
Week	Issue Date	Artist	Single
53	January 1	Lou Bega	"Mambo No. 5"
1	January 8	Lou Bega	"Mambo No. 5"
2	January 15	Eiffel 65	"Move Your Body"
3	January 22	Eiffel 65	"Move Your Body"
4	January 29	Hélène Ségara	"Il y a trop de gens qui t'aiment"
5	February 5	Eiffel 65	"Move Your Body"
6	February 12	Eiffel 65	"Move Your Body"
7	February 19	Hélène Ségara	"Il y a trop de gens qui t'aiment"
8	February 26	Tom Jones and Mousse T.	"Sex Bomb"
9	March 4	Tom Jones and Mousse T.	"Sex Bomb"
10	March 11	Tom Jones and Mousse T.	"Sex Bomb"
11	March 18	Tom Jones and Mousse T.	"Sex Bomb"
12	March 25	Tom Jones and Mousse T.	"Sex Bomb"
13	April 1	Tom Jones and Mousse T.	"Sex Bomb"
14	April 8	Tom Jones and Mousse T.	"Sex Bomb"
15	April 15	Yannick	"Ces soirées-là"
16	April 22	Yannick	"Ces soirées-là"
17	April 29	Yannick	"Ces soirées-là"
18	May 6	Yannick	"Ces soirées-là"
19	May 13	Yannick	"Ces soirées-là"
20	May 20	Yannick	"Ces soirées-là"
21	May 27	Yannick	"Ces soirées-là"
22	June 3	Yannick	"Ces soirées-là"
23	June 10	Yannick	"Ces soirées-là"
24	June 17	Yannick	"Ces soirées-là"
25	June 24	Yannick	"Ces soirées-là"
26	July 1	Yannick	"Ces soirées-là"
27	July 8	Yannick	"Ces soirées-là"
28	July 15	Yannick	"Ces soirées-là"
29	July 22	Yannick	"Ces soirées-là"
30	July 29	Santana featuring The Product G&B	"Maria Maria"
31	August 5	Santana featuring The Product G&B	"Maria Maria"
32	August 12	Santana featuring The Product G&B	"Maria Maria"
33	August 19	Santana featuring The Product G&B	"Maria Maria"
34	August 26	Philippe d'Avilla, Damien Sargue and Gregori Baquet	"Les Rois du monde"
35	September 2	Philippe d'Avilla, Damien Sargue and Gregori Baquet	"Les Rois du monde"
36	September 9	Philippe d'Avilla, Damien Sargue and Gregori Baquet	"Les Rois du monde"
37	September 16	Philippe d'Avilla, Damien Sargue and Gregori Baquet	"Les Rois du monde"
38	September 23	Philippe d'Avilla, Damien Sargue and Gregori Baquet	"Les Rois du monde"
39	September 30	Philippe d'Avilla, Damien Sargue and Gregori Baquet	"Les Rois du monde"
40	October 7	Philippe d'Avilla, Damien Sargue and Gregori Baquet	"Les Rois du monde"
41	October 14	Philippe d'Avilla, Damien Sargue and Gregori Baquet	"Les Rois du monde"
42	October 21	Philippe d'Avilla, Damien Sargue and Gregori Baquet	"Les Rois du monde"
43	October 28	Philippe d'Avilla, Damien Sargue and Gregori Baquet	"Les Rois du monde"
44	November 4	Philippe d'Avilla, Damien Sargue and Gregori Baquet	"Les Rois du monde"
45	November 11	Philippe d'Avilla, Damien Sargue and Gregori Baquet	"Les Rois du monde"
46	November 18	Daft Punk	"One More Time"
47	November 25	Philippe d'Avilla, Damien Sargue and Gregori Baquet	"Les Rois du monde"
48	December 2	Philippe d'Avilla, Damien Sargue and Gregori Baquet	"Les Rois du monde"
49	December 9	Philippe d'Avilla, Damien Sargue and Gregori Baquet	"Les Rois du monde"
50	December 16	Philippe d'Avilla, Damien Sargue and Gregori Baquet	"Les Rois du monde"
51	December 23	Philippe d'Avilla, Damien Sargue and Gregori Baquet	"Les Rois du monde"
52	December 30	Alizée	"L'Alizé"

=== Albums Chart ===
Week	Issue Date	Artist	Title
1	8 January	Johnny Hallyday	Sang pour sang
2	15 January	Patrick Bruel	Juste avant
3	22 January	Louise Attaque	Comme on a dit
4	29 January	Louise Attaque	Comme on a dit
5	5 February	Louise Attaque	Comme on a dit
6	12 February	Louise Attaque	Comme on a dit
7	19 February	Louise Attaque	Comme on a dit
8	26 February	Santana	Supernatural
9	4 March	Les Enfoirés	Les Enfoirés en 2000
10	11 March	Les Enfoirés	Les Enfoirés en 2000
11	18 March	Les Enfoirés	Les Enfoirés en 2000
12	25 March	Les Enfoirés	Les Enfoirés en 2000
13	1 April	Les Enfoirés	Les Enfoirés en 2000
14	8 April	Santana	Supernatural
15	15 April	Santana	Supernatural
16	22 April	Etienne Daho	Corps et armes
17	29 April	Santana	Supernatural
18	6 May	Santana	Supernatural
19	13 May	Santana	Supernatural
20	20 May	Britney Spears	Oops!… I Did It Again
21	27 May	Britney Spears	Oops!... I Dit It Again
22	3 June	Santana	Supernatural
23	10 June	Santana	Supernatural
24	17 June	Santana	Supernatural
25	24 June	Moby	Play
26	1 July	Johnny Hallyday	Live à la Tour Eiffel
27	8 July	Johnny Hallyday	Live à la Tour Eiffel
28	15 July	Moby	Play
29	22 July	Moby	Play
30	29 July	Moby	Play
31	5 August	Moby	Play
32	12 August	Moby	Play
33	19 August	Moby	Play
34	26 August	Moby	Play
35	2 September	Moby	Play
36	9 September	Moby	Play
37	16 September	Michel Sardou	Français
38	23 September	Madonna	Music
39	30 September	Madonna	Music
40	7 October	Radiohead	Kid A
41	14 October	Placebo	Black Market Music
42	21 October	Vanessa Paradis	Bliss
43	28 October	Lynda Lemay	Du coq à l'âme
44	4 November	U2	All That You Can't Leave Behind
45	11 November	Florent Pagny	Châtelet Les Halles
46	18 November	Julien Clerc	Si j'étais elle
47	25 November	Noël ensemble	100 artistes ensembles contre le Sida
48	2 December	Noël ensemble	100 artistes ensembles contre le Sida
49	9 December	Mylène Farmer	Mylenium Tour
50	16 December	Roméo et Juliette, de la Haine à l'Amour	Roméo et Juliette
51	23 December	Roméo et Juliette, de la Haine à l'Amour	Roméo et Juliette
52	30 December	Roméo et Juliette, de la Haine à l'Amour	Roméo et Juliette

== Top Ten best sales ==
This is the ten best-selling singles and albums in 2000.

=== Singles ===
Pos.	Artist	Title
1	Yannick	"Ces Soirées-là"
2	Baquet, Sargue & D'Avilla	"Les Rois du monde"
3	Alizée	"Moi... Lolita"
4	Daniel Lévi	"L'Envie d'aimer"
5	Cécilia Cara & Damien Sargue	"Aimer"
6	Anastacia	"I'm Outta Love"
7	Saïan Supa Crew	"Angela"
8	Santana	"Maria Maria"
9	Assia	"Elle est à toi"
10	Tom Jones & Mousse T.	"Sex Bomb"

=== Albums ===
Pos.	Artist	Title
1	Roméo et Juliette	Roméo et Juliette
2	Santana	Supernatural
3	Moby	Play
4	Hélène Ségara	Au Nom d'une Femme
5	Les Enfoirés	Enfoirés en 2000
6	Les Dix Commandements	Les Dix Commandements
7	Louise Attaque	Comme on a dit
8	Patrick Bruel	Juste avant
9	Shania Twain	Come on Over
10	Eminem	The Marshall Mathers LP

== See also ==
- 2000 in music
- List of number-one hits (France)
- List of artists who reached number one on the French Singles Chart
