= Ultratop 40 number-one hits of 2000 =

This is a list of songs that topped the Belgian Walloon (francophone) Ultratop 40 in 2000.

Date	Title	Artist
January 1	"If I Could Turn Back the Hands of Time"	R. Kelly
January 8	"If I Could Turn Back the Hands of Time"	R. Kelly
January 15	"If I Could Turn Back the Hands of Time"	R. Kelly
January 22	"If I Could Turn Back the Hands of Time"	R. Kelly
January 29	"Parce que c'est toi"	Axelle Red
February 5	"Il y a trop de gens qui t'aiment"	Hélène Ségara
February 12	"Il y a trop de gens qui t'aiment"	Hélène Ségara
February 19	"Il y a trop de gens qui t'aiment"	Hélène Ségara
February 26	"Il y a trop de gens qui t'aiment"	Hélène Ségara
March 4	"Il y a trop de gens qui t'aiment"	Hélène Ségara
March 11	"Il y a trop de gens qui t'aiment"	Hélène Ségara
March 18	"Il y a trop de gens qui t'aiment"	Hélène Ségara
March 25	"Pure Shores"	All Saints
April 1	"Pure Shores"	All Saints
April 8	"Lucky Star"	Superfunk featuring Ron Carroll
April 15	"Les trois cloches"	Tina Arena
April 22	"Les trois cloches"	Tina Arena
April 29	"Les trois cloches"	Tina Arena
May 6	"Oops!... I Did It Again"	Britney Spears
May 13	"Freestyler"	Bomfunk MC's
May 20	"Freestyler"	Bomfunk MC's
May 27	"Freestyler"	Bomfunk MC's
June 3	"Ces soirées-là"	Yannick
June 10	"Ces soirées-là"	Yannick
June 17	"Ces soirées-là"	Yannick
June 24	"Ces soirées-là"	Yannick
July 1	"Ces soirées-là"	Yannick
July 8	"Ces soirées-là"	Yannick
July 15	"Ces soirées-là"	Yannick
July 22	"Ces soirées-là"	Yannick
July 29	"Ces soirées-là"	Yannick
August 5	"Ces soirées-là"	Yannick
August 12	"I'm Outta Love"	Anastacia
August 19	"I'm Outta Love"	Anastacia
August 26	"I'm Outta Love"	Anastacia
September 2	"Les Rois du monde"	Damien Sargue, Philippe D'Avilla and Grégori Baquet
September 9	"Les Rois du monde"	Damien Sargue, Philippe D'Avilla and Grégori Baquet
September 16	"Les Rois du monde"	Damien Sargue, Philippe D'Avilla and Grégori Baquet
September 23	"Les Rois du monde"	Damien Sargue, Philippe D'Avilla and Grégori Baquet
September 30	"Les Rois du monde"	Damien Sargue, Philippe D'Avilla and Grégori Baquet
October 7	"Les Rois du monde"	Damien Sargue, Philippe D'Avilla and Grégori Baquet
October 14	"Les Rois du monde"	Damien Sargue, Philippe D'Avilla and Grégori Baquet
October 21	"Les Rois du monde"	Damien Sargue, Philippe D'Avilla and Grégori Baquet
October 28	"Les Rois du monde"	Damien Sargue, Philippe D'Avilla and Grégori Baquet
November 4	"Les Rois du monde"	Damien Sargue, Philippe D'Avilla and Grégori Baquet
November 11	"Les Rois du monde"	Damien Sargue, Philippe D'Avilla and Grégori Baquet
November 18	"Les Rois du monde"	Damien Sargue, Philippe D'Avilla and Grégori Baquet
November 25	"Les Rois du monde"	Damien Sargue, Philippe D'Avilla and Grégori Baquet
December 2	"Les Rois du monde"	Damien Sargue, Philippe D'Avilla and Grégori Baquet
December 9	"Parle-moi"	Isabelle Boulay
December 16	"Seul"	Garou
December 23	"Seul"	Garou
December 30	"Seul"	Garou

== See also ==
- 2000 in music
