= Brian Joubert =

French figure skater (born 1984)

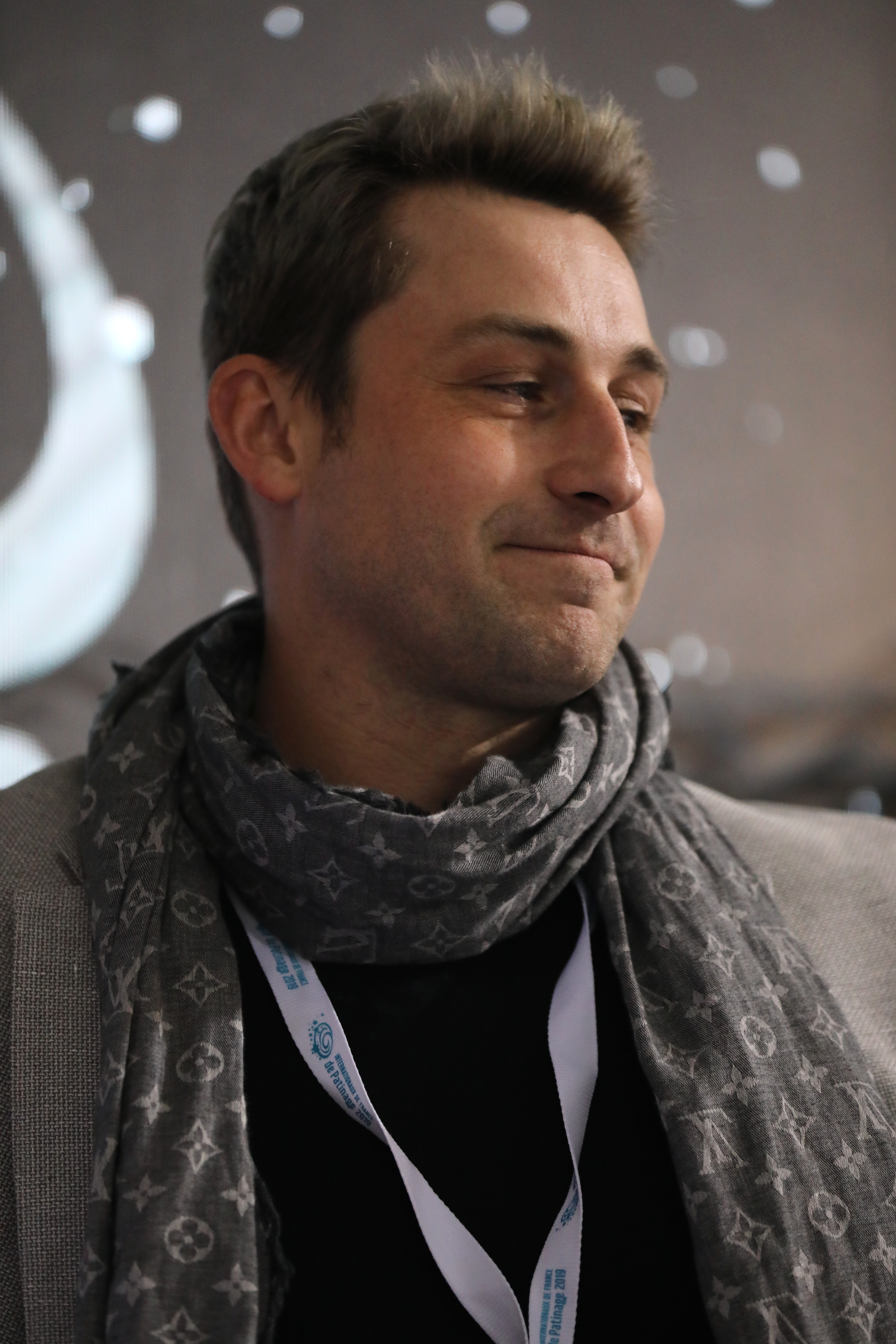
- Joubert in 2019

Personal information
- Born: 20 September 1984 (age 41) Poitiers, France
- Height: 1.79 m (5 ft 10 in)

Figure skating career
- Country: France
- Skating club: Club France F.F.S.G.
- Began skating: 1988
- Retired: February 14, 2014

Medal record
Event	Gold medal – first place	Silver medal – second place	Bronze medal – third place
World Championships	1	3	2
European Championships	3	3	4
Grand Prix Final	1	0	1
French Championships	8	1	1
Medal list
World Championships
Gold medal – first place	2007 Tokyo	Singles
Silver medal – second place	2004 Dortmund	Singles
Silver medal – second place	2005 Calgary	Singles
Silver medal – second place	2008 Gothenburg	Singles
Bronze medal – third place	2009 Los Angeles	Singles
Bronze medal – third place	2010 Turin	Singles
European Championships
Gold medal – first place	2004 Budapest	Singles
Gold medal – first place	2007 Warsaw	Singles
Gold medal – first place	2009 Helsinki	Singles
Silver medal – second place	2003 Malmö	Singles
Silver medal – second place	2005 Turin	Singles
Silver medal – second place	2011 Bern	Singles
Bronze medal – third place	2002 Lausanne	Singles
Bronze medal – third place	2006 Lyon	Singles
Bronze medal – third place	2008 Zagreb	Singles
Bronze medal – third place	2010 Tallinn	Singles
Grand Prix Final
Gold medal – first place	2006–07 Saint Petersburg	Singles
Bronze medal – third place	2002–03 Saint Petersburg	Singles
French Championships
Gold medal – first place	2003 Asnières	Singles
Gold medal – first place	2004 Briançon	Singles
Gold medal – first place	2005 Rennes	Singles
Gold medal – first place	2006 Besançon	Singles
Gold medal – first place	2007 Orléans	Singles
Gold medal – first place	2008 Megève	Singles
Gold medal – first place	2011 Tours	Singles
Gold medal – first place	2012 Dammarie-les-Lys	Singles
Silver medal – second place	2014 Vaujany	Singles
Bronze medal – third place	2002 Grenoble	Singles

Brian Joubert (French pronunciation: [bʁajan ʒubɛʁ]; born 20 September 1984) is a French figure skating coach and former competitor. He is the 2007 World champion, a three-time (2004, 2007 & 2009) European champion, and the 2006–07 Grand Prix Final champion. On the domestic level, he is an eight-time (2003–2008, 2011, 2012) French National champion.

In total, he is a six-time World medalist, a ten-time European medalist, and competed in four Winter Olympics for France.

Joubert is one of the four male skaters who achieved a Grand Slam, winning all major international competitions throughout the same season, as well as the first man to land 100 quadruple jumps in international competitions.

== Personal life ==
Brian Joubert was born in Poitiers, Vienne to Raymonde and Jean-Michel Joubert. He has two older sisters, Sarah and Alexandra. He suffered a life-threatening illness at the age of 11 months, which led to the removal of one kidney.

Joubert has been considered a heartthrob in his native country, France. This reputation has been contributed by media appearances after his first victory at the 2004 European Championships and silver medal at the World Championships and short relationship with former Miss France, Lætitia Bléger. He later brought a lawsuit against Bléger for 40,000 Euros for insinuating that he was homosexual and that their relationship was arranged to hide this. Bléger and two magazines that published her allegations were ordered by a French court to pay a total of 17,000 Euros, and to publish the court ruling in one of the two magazines. Joubert was later involved with Italian figure skater Valentina Marchei but the relationship ended by 2009.

Joubert keeps many pets, which can be seen in television reports about his home life. He is also known as a motorcycle and car racing enthusiast.

In March 2006, Joubert's biography, Brian Joubert: le Feu sur la Glace (Brian Joubert: the fire on ice), was published in French. A second book about him, entitled Brian Joubert sur papier glacé (Brian Joubert on glossy paper), was published in February 2010.

== Career ==
=== Early career ===
Brian Joubert began skating at the age of four, with his sisters. Although he originally hoped to play hockey, Joubert became fascinated with the jumping aspect of figure skating.

Joubert took part in few international events as a junior. His first major international competition was the 2000 World Junior Championships, where he placed 15th. The following season, he placed 4th at both his junior Grand Prix assignments, and later finished 14th at senior nationals, and failed to qualify for the French team for 2001 Junior Worlds. The president of the French Ice Sports Federation, Didier Gailhaguet, entered Joubert in the 2001 Top Jump competition, where he placed second. Joubert turned senior following the 2000–2001 season.

=== Senior career ===
==== 2001–2006 ====
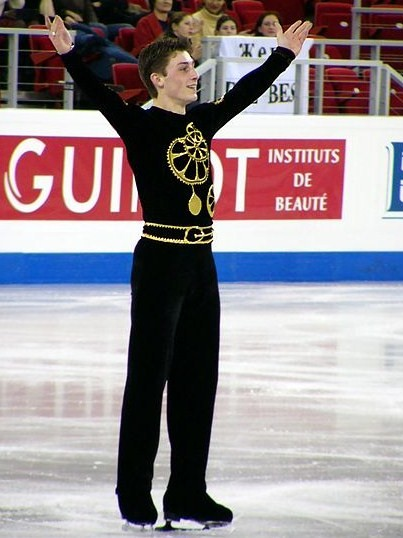
Joubert at the 2004 Europeans

Joubert made his international senior debut at the 2001 Skate America, where he placed 9th. At French Nationals, he won the bronze medal, qualifying him for the 2002 European Championships. At the Europeans, Joubert surprised many by winning the bronze medal, which earned him a spot on the 2002 Olympic team. Joubert was the youngest athlete to represent France at the Salt Lake City games and finished 14th. He rose one spot to 13th at the 2002 World Championships the following month.

Joubert improved upon his debut season in 2002–2003. Following the withdrawal of Alexei Yagudin from 2002 Skate America due to a hip injury, Joubert won the event; it was his first international title. Combined with a fifth-place finish at the 2002 Trophée Lalique, he qualified for his first Grand Prix of Figure Skating Final, where he won the bronze medal. Joubert also won the French national championships that season, the first of six consecutive titles. He was the silver medalist at the 2003 Europeans and placed 6th at the 2003 Worlds.

In the 2003–2004 season, Joubert once again won a medal on the Grand Prix circuit. At the 2004 European Championships, he became the first Frenchman to win the event in 40 years and the first non-Russian to win the event since 1996. He won his first World medal, a silver, at that year's World Championships.

The 2004–2005 season started well for Joubert; he won two Grand Prix medals and was the silver medalist at the 2005 European Championships, but dropped to 6th at the World Championships. Joubert fought back in 2005-2006, but had inconsistent results: he won two Grand Prix medals but did not qualify for the final, and won the bronze medal at the 2006 Europeans. Billed by the French media as a top medal contender for the Olympics, Joubert finished a disappointing sixth at the 2006 Winter Olympics. He had a better showing at the 2006 World Championships, winning the short program and finishing with a silver medal behind Stéphane Lambiel.

==== 2006–2007 season ====
Joubert won every event he entered in the 2006–2007 season, including his two Grand Prix assignments, the Trophée Eric Bompard and the Cup of Russia, as well as the Grand Prix Final in Saint Petersburg. He then reclaimed his European title at the 2007 European Championships in Warsaw.

Joubert was injured while training in February 2007: the blade of his left skate slashed into his right foot during a triple lutz, an injury that required stitches to his tendon. He returned to the ice only a few days later but the injury did not fully heal until a few days prior to the 2007 World Championships, and he was unable to properly train lutzes and flips. Despite this setback, Joubert skated well enough in Tokyo to earn his first World title. He finished 3rd in the long program, but had built up enough of a lead in the short program to win overall, with a then-personal best score of 240.85. French daily evening newspaper Le Monde and French nationwide daily sports newspaper L'Équipe put him on the front page.

==== 2007–2008 season ====
Joubert began the 2007–2008 season at Skate Canada, which he won. He was forced to withdraw from the Trophée Éric Bompard, his second Grand Prix event, due to illness. Although he continued to suffer from fatigue for several weeks afterward, Joubert was able to win his sixth consecutive national title; at that point, he had won ten consecutive events over two seasons. At the 2008 European Championships in January 2008, Joubert earned the bronze medal despite a fall on the triple axel in the short program and mistakes in the long program. In March 2008, he competed at the 2008 World Championships, where he was sixth after the short program but rallied to win the silver medal behind Canadian Jeffrey Buttle.

==== 2008–2009 season ====
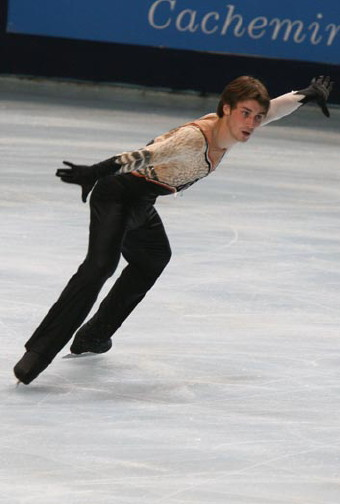
Joubert at the 2008 Trophée Eric Bompard.

In the 2008–09 ISU Grand Prix season, Joubert finished 4th at the Trophée Eric Bompard, then won the Cup of Russia and qualified for the Grand Prix Final. He withdrew from the Final before the long program due to a back injury, and withdrew from the 2009 French Championships prior to the event. He replaced his first long program with a new one, the first time he had made such a change in the middle of a season.

At the 2009 European Championships, Joubert scored a new personal best to take the lead after the short program, and finished second in the long program, with a total score high enough to win his third European title. At the 2009 World Championships, he led after the short program, but had problems on some of his jumps in the long program and finished third overall. He then made a coaching change prior to the season ending event, the inaugural World Team Trophy, where he finished second in the men's event; Team France finished 4th.

==== 2009–2010 season ====
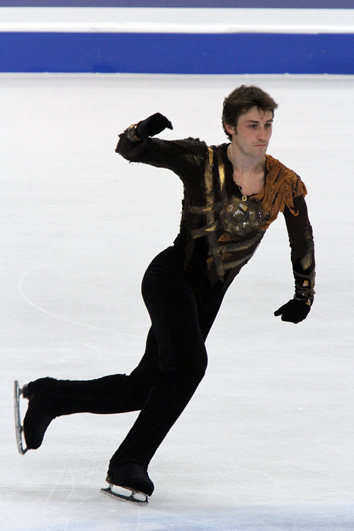
Joubert at the 2010 World Championships

In the 2009–10 ISU Grand Prix season, Joubert again had a disappointing fourth-place finish at the Trophée Éric Bompard, before winning the NHK Trophy for the first time in his career. The combined placements enabled him to qualify for the 2009–10 Grand Prix Final. However, he sustained a serious foot injury in practice in late November 2009. During a triple lutz attempt, his left blade sliced his right foot and cut to the bone – a similar injury to the one he had suffered in February 2007, but more serious than the previous time. Joubert required surgery to repair tendon and ligament damage, and consequently withdrew from the Grand Prix Final and from the French Championships in December. He was unable to resume normal training for several weeks. Joubert returned in time for the 2010 European championships, where he set a new personal best score for the short program but faltered in the free skate, finishing third overall.

At the 2010 Winter Olympics, Joubert, considered by many to be a gold medal contender, skated poorly in the short program and wound up in 16th place at the end of the competition. "It's another disappointment at the Olympic Games. These Games have beaten me", Joubert told reporters. "I just can't do it at the Olympic Games. Every time it goes badly. I don't understand why. I can't explain why." Forced to undergo a selection test in order to be sent to the World Championships, Joubert made an impressive recovery at that event. In the short program, he successfully landed a quad toe loop-triple toe loop combination and two additional triples, finishing third in that segment of the competition. He then landed two more quadruple toe loops in the free skate but made mistakes on some of his other jumps, finishing fourth in that segment and winning his fifth consecutive medal at Worlds, a bronze. Joubert later said that he was very proud of his performance; he added that he had been unsure whether he would be able to compete again and had achieved his main goal, which was to regain his confidence.

==== 2010–2011 season ====
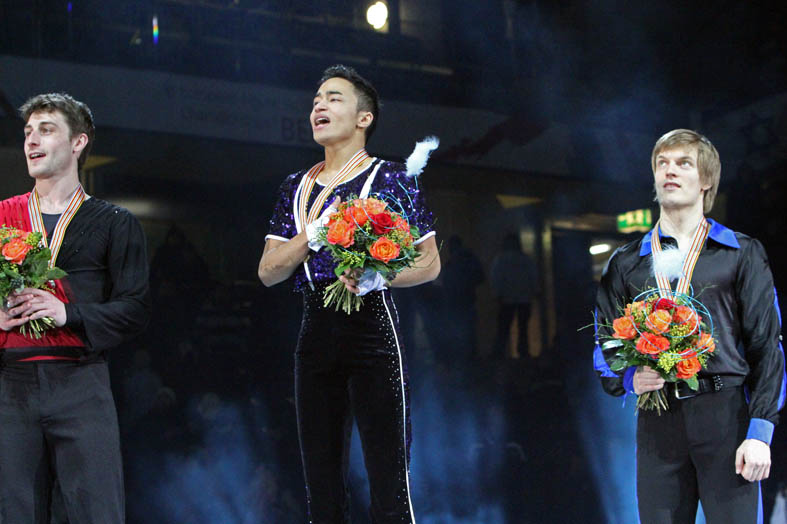
Joubert, Florent Amodio and Tomas Verner on the podium at the 2011 Europeans

Joubert's assigned events for the 2010–2011 ISU Grand Prix season were the 2010 Cup of China and the 2010 Trophée Eric Bompard. He once again began the season with a fourth-place finish at his first Grand Prix. Needing a win at the Trophée Eric Bompard to qualify for the Grand Prix final, Joubert had a difficult short program and withdrew prior to the long program because of gastroenteritis. Joubert recovered in time to compete at the French National Championships, and won his seventh national title.

Only seventh after the short program, Joubert was first in the free skate to win the silver medal at the 2011 European Championships, with compatriot Florent Amodio taking gold. It was Joubert's tenth medal at the competition, equaling the record set by Ulrich Salchow and matched by Karl Schäfer for most medals by a singles skater at the Europeans; both Schäfer and Joubert won their medals consecutively. Joubert later said he feels less pressure with Amodio's emergence, "It's good for me; [the media] are no longer focused on just me."

Joubert injured his left knee during the season, and by the time of the 2011 Worlds, he was receiving injections in an attempt to manage the pain. A mistake on his quad jump, meant to be part of a jump combination, left Joubert in ninth place after the short program. In the free skating, Joubert cut his hand on his skate blade and required medical attention afterward, but skated well nonetheless to finish fourth in that segment, moving up one spot to eighth. Although it was the first time he had finished off the podium at Worlds since 2005, Joubert stated that he was very happy with his free skate, referring to it as the most emotional of his career. He added that it felt good to finish his season with such a performance.

In a post-season interview, Joubert said that the 2010–11 season had not turned out as he had hoped, but that he still had a strong record throughout his career. He added that "perhaps I was burned out after so many years. I was also worried about my left knee. I put pressure on my hips more and more to compensate for the pain I was feeling". Following the season, Joubert consulted different specialists about his knee injury and was told he would be unlikely to fully recover his normal strength if he underwent surgery; he therefore decided on a strict diet and specific exercises to restore his musculature balance.

==== 2011–2012 season ====
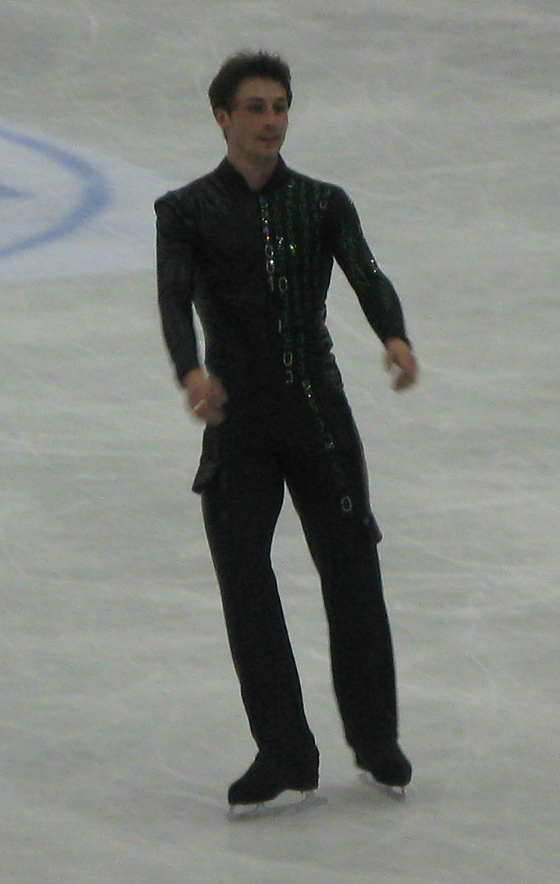
Joubert at 2012 Worlds.

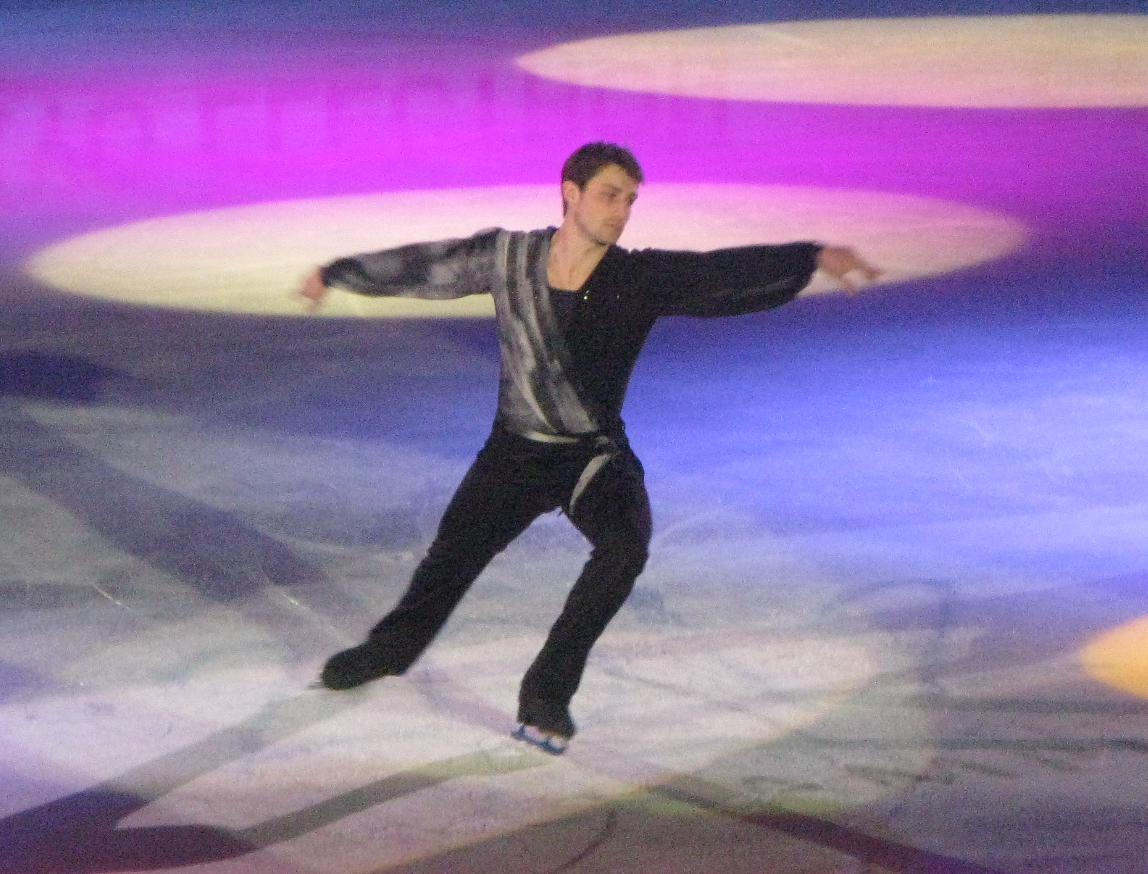
Joubert at 2012 Worlds.

At the beginning of the season, Joubert announced that he would continue working with coach Veronique Guyon and choreographer David Wilson. As part of his preparation for the season, he also spent three weeks beginning in mid-July in Luleå, Sweden at a summer camp headed by Alexei Urmanov, and then went to Toronto, Ontario, Canada to work with Wilson.

Joubert intended to begin the 2011–12 season at the 2011 Nebelhorn Trophy, but withdrew prior to the event. His assignments for the 2011–12 Grand Prix season were the 2011 Cup of China and the 2011 Trophée Eric Bompard. He sustained a back injury in practice shortly before the Cup of China and consequently withdrew from that event as well as from the Trophée Eric Bompard. Although not fully healed, Joubert returned in time for the 2012 French National Championships and won his eighth national title. Joubert did not fare well at the 2012 European Figure Skating Championships and placed 8th, the first time he had failed to win a medal at the Europeans. His next event was the 2012 International Challenge Cup; he finished first in the free skating and overall, as well as receiving credit for two different quad jumps in the short program.

At the 2012 Worlds, Joubert skated his best short program in two years and set a new personal best score in the free skating and overall to finish fourth. Joubert declared that skating at the World Championships in France was the highlight of his career and that he was very pleased with his performance and looking forward to the next season. Joubert's final event in the 2011-12 season was the 2012 World Team Trophy, where he competed as part of Team France and finished third in the men's event.

At the end of the season, Joubert discussed his decision to use the older Matrix program: "I knew that this wasn't a program to win or to achieve great results but it is a program I feel comfortable with and I needed it in order to take off next season." He added that "With a program like The Matrix, you have a handicap of ten points from the outset compared to Patrick Chan. That means I am not allowed to make a technical mistake. If your components are good and you know that they can make up for an error on a jump, it is much easier psychologically."

==== 2012–2013 season ====
Joubert was assigned to the Cup of China and the Trophée Eric Bompard for the 2012–13 Grand Prix series. After placing 7th in the short program, he withdrew from the Cup of China due to abdominal pain and fever. Joubert returned to the ice in time to compete at the Trophee Eric Bompard, but stated that he was not fully prepared due to his illness. He went on to finish third in the short program and fourth overall.

Joubert withdrew from the 2013 French National Championships on the day prior to the event as a result of the flu. In January 2013, it was reported that he had scrapped his free program and would instead skate to the Gladiator. At the 2013 Europeans, Joubert skated well in the short program to place third in that segment, but dropped to fourth overall after the free skate. He next competed at the 2013 Challenge Cup, where he successfully defended his title. He finished 9th at the 2013 World Championships.

==== 2013–2014 season ====
Joubert's assigned events for the 2013 Grand Prix season were Skate America and the 2013 Rostelecom Cup.

Joubert returned to Poitiers and coach Veronique Guyon at the end of September 2013. He withdrew from the 2013 Master's de Patinage competition several days prior to the event, stating that he needed additional training time in order to prepare for the season.

On 14 October Joubert was removed from the entry list for Skate America. Some reports indicated that this was a sanction for his withdrawal from the Masters competition, although the French ice skating federation claims that Joubert was withdrawn from the event due to illness. Joubert later withdrew from the Rostelecom Cup due to a back injury. He returned to competition at the 2013 NRW Trophy, where he finished second. At the 2014 French Nationals, Joubert finished second in the short program and first in the long program, winning silver overall.

Joubert was 8th at the 2014 European Championships, finishing as the top Frenchman at the event. He competed at the 2014 Winter Olympics, his fourth time at the Olympics. The oldest competitor in the men's event, Joubert was 7th in the short program and 14th in the free skate, finishing 13th overall. He announced his retirement from competitive skating immediately following the free skate, and stated his intention to become a coach.

=== Post-competitive career ===
In mid-May 2014, Joubert began learning pair skating in Caen with Daria Popova and coach Jean-François Ballester. For several days in June 2014, Joubert worked as a coach in Kazakhstan together with Denis Ten and Alexei Yagudin. From 7 July to 13 July, he trained in Moscow in partnership with Katarina Gerboldt and coach Oleg Vasiliev. His mother said it was a test and denied that he intended to compete for Russia. Joubert previously experienced back problems and said his condition would factor in his decision whether to compete in pairs. In November 2014, he confirmed his competitive retirement.

In autumn 2014, he participated in the fifth season of TF1's Danse avec les Stars, finishing third.

Joubert is studying for a coaching diploma and intends to pursue a career as a skating coach. As part of his degree requirement, he intended to begin coaching in summer 2013 in Vaujany; however, due to travel problems he was unable to do so.

Joubert coaches in Poitiers. He has worked with the following skaters:

- Romain Ponsart, from autumn 2015 to November 2015
- Adam Siao Him Fa, from autumn 2017
- Lea Serna, from January 2019
- Laurine Lecavelier - Joubert mentored her training for the 2019 European Championships following the death of her coach

== Skating technique ==
Joubert was considered a strong jumper during his competitive career. He landed the quadruple salchow jump in competition and had a consistent quadruple toe loop jump. In 2013, he became the first skater to land 100 quadruple jumps in international competition. At the 2006 Cup of Russia competition, Joubert landed three quadruple jumps in his free skate: two toe loops (one in combination) and a Salchow, the first skater to accomplish this under the IJS. Joubert has stated in interviews that he considers quadruple jumps to be important for the future of figure skating as a sport. Although the triple lutz was normally consistent for him in practice, he twice cut his right foot while picking in for the jump.

According to the Japanese TV program "Miracle Body", Joubert's abdominal muscle is very strong, and he does not lose centrifugal force at the time of a turn. His muscular strength of the foot was compared to that of a track-and-field athlete who can run 100m in ten seconds. A sports science physician of the University of Poitiers said Joubert jumps at the best angle possible for quadruple jumps.

== Coaching changes and training ==
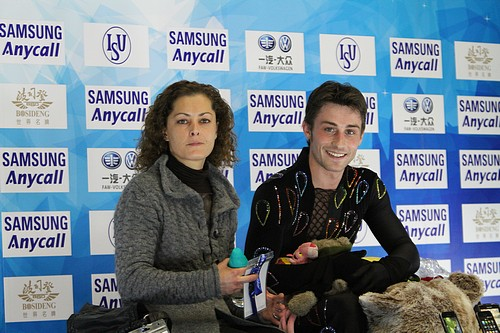
Joubert with coach Veronique Guyon at the 2010 Cup of China

Joubert kept his training base in Poitiers throughout his career, in order to remain close to his family. He trained for 15 years with Veronique Guyon, until she resigned from her position in the summer of 2003 to spend more time with her family. Joubert then started training with Laurent Depouilly, and took on Alexei Yagudin as an 'advisor'. Joubert later parted ways with Yagudin because of Yagudin's dislike for Nikolai Morozov, Joubert's choreographer at the time.

Citing a lack of support from his coach, Joubert fired Depouilly and returned to Guyon for a brief period of time. However, Guyon's demands that Joubert stop working with his mother and that she should receive 10% of his prize money from the 2005–06 season caused their relationship to deteriorate, and they parted ways. Joubert switched to Andrei Berenzitsev until he stopped coaching; Joubert then briefly worked with Annick Dumont but they parted ways because she lived in Paris while he did not wish to leave Poitiers. In September 2006, he began working with Jean-Christophe Simond. Joubert left Simond following the 2009 Worlds, citing lack of trust. He returned to Laurent Depouilly in April 2009 and was coached by him until May 2010. Joubert later returned to his first coach, Veronique Guyon, and worked with Patrick Gueppe for part of the 2011-12 season.

Following the 2012 World Championships, Joubert stated that he would train in different locations during the 2012–2013 season, because his home rink in Poitiers was to be torn down in order to build a new one by the 2013–2014 season. He was unable to get ice in nearby Niort. In September 2012, shortly before the Poitier rink's closure, Joubert relocated to Paris; he trained with Annick Dumont at Champigny-sur-Marne and remained in contact with Guyon. Joubert lived at the Institute of Physical Education (INSEP) and said that he might be able to return to the Poitiers rink at the end of June 2013. By January 2013, he had returned to Poitiers and was training in La Roche-sur-Yon. Later in the season, he trained with Katia Krier in Paris-Bercy. After it was announced that the Poitiers rink would reopen later than originally expected, Joubert decided to continue training with Katia Krier and Claude Péri in Paris in 2013–2014. However, the Poitiers rink renovation was ultimately ready in time for the season, and Joubert returned there in September to work with his longtime coach Veronique Guyon.

In an April 2012 interview, Joubert said that he prefers to practice programs in parts: "I like to train the programs in pieces over and over to know in order to really know them by heart. [...] Later, you have to combine both – skating a lot of pieces and skating the programs as a whole. Doing run-throughs all the time is something that I don't like and don't feel comfortable with."

== Public life and endorsements ==
Joubert received the François Lafon Prize (Prize for young hope) 2003, the prize of the City of Paris 2007 from the French Academy of Sport. He also won the special prize of French Senate Trophy for Sports 2007.

Joubert has sponsored an association for children with Williams syndrome, the assistance pet association Europe and others. He has also taken part in many local events of Poitiers city and Poitou-Charentes region.

Joubert has toured primarily with the French show Stars Sur Glace (Stars on Ice) during the off-season in France, but has also performed in other countries, including Monaco, Italy, the United States, Russia, Japan and South Korea.

Joubert has made many guest appearance on TV, including France 2's television gala Tenue de Soiree, figure skating world champion special (2 February 2008), Tous ensemble (the French version of Extreme Makeover: Home Edition, 12 February 2011) on TF1, the popular adventure game show Fort Boyard on France 2 in 2004, 2007, 2008 and 2012. He took on a starring role in the mini-series Brisons la Glace in 2012.

Joubert has appeared in advertisements as a spokesperson for the French Olympic committee, his home city of Poitiers, and sponsor Damart, Risport Skate. His other former and current sponsors are the Eric Bompard company, MK, LPG Systems, Rossignol. He has also forged a partnership with French Alps ski resort Vaujany.

In January 2014, he supported the socialist Alain Claeys in the Poitiers mayoral election.

== Programs ==
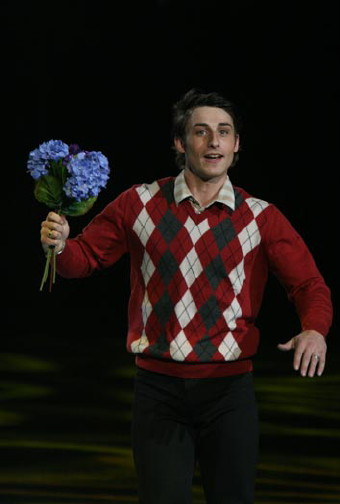
Joubert performs his Madeleine exhibition at the 2008 Trophée Eric Bompard gala

=== Post-2014 ===
Season	Exhibition
2016–17	Sarabande Suite by Globus
2015–16	My Treasure by Kaname Kawabata Apocalypse by Edvin Marton & Vienna Straus Symphony Orchestra Die Another Day (from James Bond) by David Arnold Jazz: Where Was I by Eddie Baxter; I Love Paris by Louis Prima; Viens a Saint Germain by Dany Brillant; Sarabande Suite (Aeternae) by Globus choreo. by Nikolai Morozov Rise (Leave Me Alone) by Safri Duo Time by Pink Floyd Gladiator by Hans Zimmer Con te partirò (Time to Say Goodbye) by Sarah Àlainn & Tomotaka Okamoto
2014–15	Missing by Che'Nelle Con te partirò (Time to Say Goodbye) by Sarah Àlainn & Tomotaka Okamoto Stay with Me by Sam Smith Time by Pink Floyd Ces soirées-là by Yannick The Snow King: The Prince and the Princess are dancing with the Dance Teacher by Valery Paramonov; The Prince and the Princess are seeing Gerda off by Valery Paramonov; The Shaman by Valery Paramonov; The Shaman saves Gerda by Valery Paramonov; When the ice melts by Dima Bilan; Christmas Lights by Coldplay Clubbed to Death (from The Matrix) by Rob Dougan Lord of the Dance by Ronan Hardiman I Gotta Feeling by Black Eyed Peas On the Run by Yello Sur ma peau (from 1789: Les Amants de la Bastille) by Louis Delort

=== Pre-2014 ===
Season	Short program	Free skating	Exhibition
2013–14	Mutation from Amaluna by Cirque du Soleil choreo. by Nikolai Morozov; Oblivion Tango; Concierto Para Quinteto by Astor Piazzolla choreo. by Maxim Staviski	Concierto de Aranjuez by Joaquín Rodrigo choreo. by Laurie May	SOS d'un terrien en détresse (from Starmania) by Grégory Lemarchal; Rise (Leave Me Alone) by Safri Duo; Beautiful People by Chris Brown feat. Benny Benassi; Hallelujah by Amaury Vassili; Sandstorm by Darude; Millennium and Let Me Entertain You by Robbie Williams; I Want It All by Queen; Dark Eyes by Joseph Kobzon; Lord of the Dance by Ronan Hardiman; I Gotta Feeling by Black Eyed Peas; Sur ma peau (from 1789: Les Amants de la Bastille) by Louis Delort
2012–13	Genesis by Justice; Aerodynamic by Daft Punk choreo. by Giuseppe Arena	Gladiator by Hans Zimmer choreo. by Laurie May; Inception by Hans Zimmer arranged by Maxime Rodriguez choreo. by Albena Denkova, Maxim Staviski	Gladiator by Hans Zimmer; L'assasymphonie (from Mozart, l'opéra rock) by Florent Mothe; SOS d'un terrien en détresse (from Starmania) by Grégory Lemarchal; Canción sefaradí by Luc Arbogast; Rise (Leave Me Alone) by Safri Duo; Superman by Crystal Kay; I Look to You by R. Kelly; Words Are Flying Out by Stéphane Lafrance; Battle Without Honor or Humanity (from Kill Bill) by Gilles Pellegrini & Orchestra; Luna tu by Mezzo; The Four Seasons by Antonio Vivaldi; La donna è mobile (from Rigoletto) by Giuseppe Verdi
2011–12	Genesis by Justice; Aerodynamic by Daft Punk choreo. by David Wilson	Clubbed to Death (from The Matrix) by Rob Dougan	Little Love by AaRON; L'assasymphonie (from Mozart, l'opéra rock) by Florent Mothe; Rise (Leave Me Alone) by Safri Duo; SOS d'un terrien en détresse (from Starmania) by Grégory Lemarchal; Ça ira mon amour (from 1789: Les Amants de la Bastille) by Rod Janois; An freij de an neo era by Luc Arbogast; Lord of the Dance by Ronan Hardiman; My Star by Roza Rymbayeva; New year's melody for Sashen'ka by Igor Krutoy
2010–11	Malagueña (from Once Upon a Time in Mexico) by Robert Rodriguez performed by Brian Setzer choreo. by Antonio Najarro	Symphony No. 9 by Ludwig van Beethoven choreo. by David Wilson	Sandstorm by Darude; Love Is All by Roger Glover; Aerodynamic by Daft Punk; Little Love by AaRON; C'est bientôt la fin (from Mozart, l'opéra rock); I Gotta Feeling by Black Eyed Peas; Rise (Leave Me Alone) by Safri Duo
2009–10	Rise (Leave Me Alone) by Safri Duo choreo. by Evgeny Platov	Ancient Lands by Ronan Hardiman arranged by Maxime Rodriguez choreo. by Albena Denkova, Maxim Staviski	Infinity 2008 by Guru Josh Project; Le patineur by Julien Clerc; Merci by Grégoire; L'assasymphonie (from Mozart, l'opéra rock) by Florent Mothe; Sandstorm by Darude; Madeleine by Jacques Brel
2008–09	Rise (Leave Me Alone) by Safri Duo choreo. by Evgeny Platov	The Last of the Mohicans by Randy Edelman, Trevor Jones, Daniel Lanois choreo. by Evgeny Platov; The Matrix Reloaded by Don Davis; Requiem for a Dream by Clint Mansell	Hallelujah by Rufus Wainwright; Sandstorm by Darude; Le patineur by Julien Clerc; Madeleine by Jacques Brel; I'm yours by Jason Mraz
2007–08	All For You by Sébastien Damiani	Enter Sandman; Nothing Else Matters; Creeping Death; Unforgiven by Apocalyptica; O Verona (from Romeo + Juliet) by Nellee Hooper, Craig Armstrong, Marius de Vries	Clocks by Coldplay; Rise (Leave Me Alone) by Safri Duo; Le patineur by Lââm
2006–07	Die Another Day (from James Bond) by David Arnold	Enter Sandman; Nothing Else Matters; Creeping Death; Unforgiven by Apocalyptica; O Verona (from Romeo + Juliet) by Nellee Hooper, Craig Armstrong, Marius de Vries	You Are Loved (Don't Give Up) by Josh Groban; Rise (Leave Me Alone) by Safri Duo; Tu aurais du me dire by Tina Arena; Armonia by Sébastien Damiani; SOS d'un terrien en détresse (from Starmania) by Daniel Balavoine; Medley by Elvis Presley; Love Is All by Roger Glover; Aerodynamic by Daft Punk
2005–06	Die Another Day (from James Bond) by David Arnold	Lord of the Dance by Ronan Hardiman; Clubbed to Death (from The Matrix) by Rob Dougan	Medley by Daft Punk; Aerodynamic by Daft Punk; Tant qu'on rêve encore (from Le Roi Soleil); Mon ami, mon maître by Serge Lama
2004–05	Selection by Blue Man Group	1492: Conquest of Paradise by Vangelis	Lord of the Dance by Ronan Hardiman; Caruso by Andrea Bocelli
2003–04	Time by Pink Floyd	Clubbed to Death (from The Matrix) by Rob Dougan	J'ai demandé à la lune by Indochine; Love's Divine by Seal; Lettre à France by Michel Polnareff; Ces soirées-là by Yannick; On se retrouvera by Francis Lalanne
2002–03	Time by Pink Floyd	The Untouchables Soundtrack by Nelson Riddle and Ennio Morricone	Le lacs du Conemara by Michel Sardou; SOS d'un terrien en détresse (from Starmania) by Daniel Balavoine; Quelques cris by Johnny Hallyday; Ma gueule by Johnny Hallyday; Nos différences by Ève Angeli
2001–02	The Mexican Hat	The Mission by Ennio Morricone and London Philharmonic Orchestra; Robot Fight (from Dune) by Toto	L'aigle noir by Florent Pagny; The Four Seasons by Antonio Vivaldi
2000–01		Excalibur by Trevor Jones	

== Competitive highlights ==
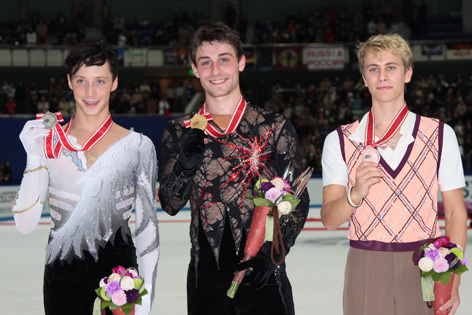
Joubert (center) with the other medalists at the 2009 NHK Trophy

GP: Grand Prix; JGP: Junior Grand Prix

International
Event	99–00	00–01	01–02	02–03	03–04	04–05	05–06	06–07	07–08	08–09	09–10	10–11	11–12	12–13	13–14
Olympics			14th				6th				16th				13th
Worlds			13th	6th	2nd	6th	2nd	1st	2nd	3rd	3rd	8th	4th	9th	
Europeans			3rd	2nd	1st	2nd	3rd	1st	3rd	1st	3rd	2nd	8th	4th	8th
Grand Prix Final				3rd		5th		1st		WD					
GP Bompard				5th	4th	2nd	2nd	1st		4th	4th	WD		4th	
GP Cup of China					2nd							4th		WD	
GP Cup of Russia								1st		1st					
GP NHK Trophy					4th						1st				
GP Skate Canada									1st						
GP Skate America			9th	1st		1st	3rd								
Challenge Cup													1st	1st	
NRW Trophy															2nd
International: Junior
Junior Worlds	15th														
JGP France		4th													
JGP Poland		4th													
National
Event	99–00	00–01	01–02	02–03	03–04	04–05	05–06	06–07	07–08	08–09	09–10	10–11	11–12	12–13	13–14
French Ch.	10th	14th	3rd	1st	1st	1st	1st	1st	1st			1st	1st		2nd
French Jr. Ch.	2nd	4th													
Masters				3rd	1st	3rd	1st	1st	1st	2nd	2nd	1st	2nd	2nd	

Team events
Event	06–07	08–09	11–12	12–13	15–16
World Team; Trophy		4th T (2nd P)	4th T (3rd P)	6th T (7th P)	
Japan Open	2nd T (3rd P)				3rd T (6th P)
