= Les Rois du monde =

2000 single by Philippe D'Avilla, Damien Sargue & Grégori Baquet

"Les Rois du Monde"

Single by Philippe D'Avilla, Damien Sargue & Grégori Baquet

from the album Roméo et Juliette, de la Haine à l'Amour
- B-side: "Un Jour"
- Released: July 2000
- Recorded: France
- Genre: Pop
- Length: 3:26
- Label: Mercury
- Songwriter: Gérard Presgurvic
- Producer: Daniel Moyne

Roméo et Juliette, de la Haine à l'Amour singles chronology
"Aimer" (2000)	"Les Rois du Monde" (2000)	"On dit dans la rue" (2000)

"Les Rois du monde" is a 2000 song performed by Philippe d'Avilla, Damien Sargue and Grégori Baquet. It was the second single from the French musical Roméo et Juliette, de la Haine à l'Amour, featuring as the fourth track on the album of the same name. Released in July 2000, the single achieved huge success in France and Belgium, topping the charts for many months.

== Lyrics and music ==
The song was written and the music composed by Gérard Presgurvic.

Elia Habib, a specialist of the French charts, commented on this song: "its refrain, bewitching choirs chiselled in its words as much as in its melody," compensating for "the tasteless of the performance" and "the clumsiness of some of its verses."

In 2001, "Les Rois du monde" won an NRJ Music Awards in the category 'Francophone song of the year.'

In 2003, the song was covered by Marc Lavoine, MC Solaar, Pierre Palmade and Dany Brillant. It features as sixth track on the album La Foire aux Enfoirés, released on 24 February 2003.

== Chart performance ==
In France, "Les Rois du monde" debuted at number 30 on the French Singles Chart on 29 July 2000 and reached number one in its fifth week, where it stayed for 17 non consecutive weeks, blocking at number two Alizée's "Moi... Lolita" for thirteen weeks. It totalled 22 weeks in the top ten, 36 weeks in the top 50 and 40 weeks on the chart (top 100), and was certified Diamond disc by the Syndicat National de l'Édition Phonographique. In Belgium (Wallonia), the single went to number 27 on the Ultratop 40 Singles Chart on 12 August 2000, reached the top ten the week after and became number one two weeks later. It remained at the top for 14 consecutive weeks and spent 22 weeks in the top ten and 32 on the chart (top 40). As in France, it was the second best-selling single of 2000, behind "Ces Soirées-là" by Yannick. In Switzerland, the single charted for 23 weeks from 24 September 2000, peaking at number nine in its fourth week and stayed for 11 weeks in the top 20. Released in the Netherlands in July 2001, it missed the top 70 and charted for four weeks on the Single Top 100 chart.

== Track listings ==
CD single

1. "Les Rois du monde" — 3:26
2. "Un Jour" by Damien Sargue and Cécilia Cara — 3:44

== Charts ==
=== Weekly charts ===
Weekly chart performance for "Les Rois du monde"
Chart (2000–01)	Peak position
Belgium (Ultratop 50 Wallonia)	1
France (SNEP)	1
Netherlands (Single Top 100)	71
Switzerland (Schweizer Hitparade)	9

=== Year-end charts ===
2000 year-end chart performance for "Les Rois du monde"
Chart (2000)	Position
Belgium (Wallonia Ultratop 40)	2
Europe (Eurochart Hot 100 Singles)	21
France (SNEP)	2
Switzerland (Schweizer Hitparade)	62

2001 year-end chart performance for "Les Rois du monde"
Chart (2001)	Position
Europe (Eurochart Hot 100 Singles)	62

== Certifications ==
Country	Certification	Date	Sales certified
France	Diamond	2000	750,000
Swiss	Gold	2001	20,000
