= Sébastien El Chato =

French singer and guitarist

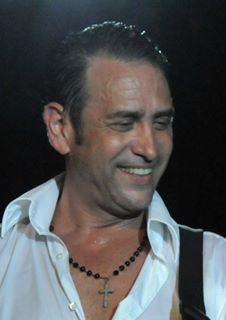
Jean-Sébastien Abaldonato

Jean-Sébastien Abaldonato better known as Sébastien El Chato (born in Marseille, France, on 5 April 1961) is a French singer and guitar player of Romani origin. He is based in Paris and has had a long string of albums since 1976.

Born to a French gypsy family of Andalusian descent, he started singing at the age of 5 in Marseille. He had his first studio recording in Spain appearing with Manolo Escobar and at age 8 was introduced by Dalida to the French public. He released a number of gitane songs in 1978, and throughout the 1980s appeared on French television with his interpretations. In 1987, his album Je l'aime had great commercial success followed by Imagine, Garde la and Le cœur d'une mère.

El Chato also took part in French musical comedy adaptations, appearing in 2001 as Count Capulet in Roméo et Juliette, de la haine à l'amour, by metteur en scène Gérard Presgurvic. In 2004, he also appeared in another French musical Les enfants du soleil written by Didier Barbelivien and mise en scène by Alexandre Arcady.

In 2011 he released the album Gipsy Rumbas, and in 2013 Venga Venga. Both have appeared on SNEP, the official French Albums Chart.

== Discography ==
=== Albums ===
Charting

Year	Album	Peak positions	Certification
Year	Album	FR	Certification
2005	L'Album	187	
2011	Gipsy Rumbas	98	
2013	Venga Venga	233	

Listing

- 1976 - Ambiance explosive
- 1976 - Ambiance explosive n°2
- 1978 - Que bonita eres
- 1979 - Medley original
- 1983 - La chunga (2 version française et espagnole)
- 1984 - Siempre mañana / baila
- 1985 - Je veux l'aimer (1ère version)
- 1985 - Ci vorrebbe un amico (sous le nom sebastian)
- 1986 - Espanito
- 1987 - Je l'aime
- 1988 - Le cœur d'une mère (version 45 tours)
- 1988 - Tous les medleys ambiance explosive
- 1989 - Imagine
- 1989 - Imagine (remix)
- 1990 - Garde-la
- 1990 - Que bonita eres (version 1990) album
- 1992 - Tous ses slows
- 1992 - Je serai là
- 1992 - Plein succès
- 1993 - A la vie, a la l'amour
- 1993 - The Collection
- 1993 - The very Best of El Chato
- 1993 - Te quiero ven
- 1994 - El Chato à Barcelona
- 1994 - Si tu te vas
- 1995 - Le coeur à l'envers
- 1996 - Viens m'embrasser
- 1998 - Dalida Le rêve Oriental
- 1999 - Collection Ambiance Explosive
- 2000 - Dalida Révolution
- 2000 - Noël ensemble
- 2001 - Avoir une fille
- 2002 - Greatest hits The Rumba
- 2003 - Face à ce monde
- 2003 - Vivant
- 2005 - L'Album
- 2007 - Besame mucho
- 2008 - L'essentiel
- 2009 - Les années gipsy
- 2010 - Quiero vivir
- 2011 - Gipsy Rumbas
- 2013 - Venga Venga

Appearances

- 2000 - Roméo et Juliette, de la Haine à l'Amour
- 2000 - Roméo et Juliette, de la haine à l'amour Live

== Musical comedies ==
- 2001: Roméo et Juliette as Count Capulet (father of Juliette)
- 2004: Les enfants du soleil
- 2015: Roméo et Juliette as Count Capulet (father of Juliette)
