= Forever Gentlemen =

French compilation album series

Compilation album by Various artists
- Released: 21 October 2013
- Label: TF1 Musique

Various artists chronology
Forever Gentlemen (2013)	Forever Gentlemen (2014)

Singles from Forever Gentlemen
- 1. "La belle vie" Released: October 2013

Forever Gentlemen is an album produced by TF1 Musique joining well-known artists. The album was released on 21 October 2013 and includes tributes to crooners of the 1950s.

The album entered the SNEP French Albums Chart at number 2 in its first week of release.

In 2015 a compilation album of Volumes 1 and 2 was released in Canada, reaching No. 2 on the Canadian album chart and No.1 on the Quebec chart.

== Track list ==
Track #	Song title	Performer	Original artist / Made famous by or theme	Length
1	"Intro"			0:40
2	"La belle vie"	Dany Brillant, Damien Sargue & Roch Voisine	Sacha Distel / Tony Bennett	2:44
3	"New York, New York"	Gad Elmaleh & Garou	Liza Minnelli / Frank Sinatra	3:09
4	"Toute la pluie tombe sur moi"	Dany Brillant, Philippe Lellouche & Emmanuel Moire	B.J. Thomas / Sacha Distel	3:14
5	"I've Got You Under My Skin"	Vincent Niclo, Dany Brillant & Paul Anka	Frank Sinatra / The Four Seasons	3:44
6	"For Me Formidable"	Bruce Johnson, Philippe Lellouche & Damien Sargue	Charles Aznavour	2:43
7	"Fly Me to the Moon"	Corneille, Vincent Niclo & Roch Voisine	Kaye Ballard / Peggy Lee	2:39
8	"Se retrouver un jour (Quien sera)"	Damien Sargue & Dany Brillant		2:22
9	"Singin' in the Rain"	Gad Elmaleh & M. Pokora	Theme from Singin' in the Rain	2:32
10	"Somethin' Stupid"	Elodie Frégé & Emmanuel Moire	Frank and Nancy Sinatra	2:36
11	"The Lady Is a Tramp"	Gilles Lellouche & Sinclair	Theme from Babes in Arms	3:36
12	"Unforgettable"	Sofia Essaïdi, Bruce Johnson, Vincent Niclo & Damien Sargue	Irving Gordon / Nat King Cole	3:25
13	"It's Impossible"	Bruce Johnson, Damien Sargue & Roch Voisine	Perry Como	3:37
14	"My Way"	Paul Anka & Garou	Frank Sinatra	4:36
15	"Outtro"			1:05

== Charts ==
=== Weekly charts ===
Chart (2013–15)	Peak position
Belgian Albums (Ultratop Flanders)	146
Belgian Albums (Ultratop Wallonia)	3
Canadian Albums (Billboard)	2
French Albums (SNEP)	2

=== Year-end charts ===
Chart (2013)	Position
Belgian Albums (Ultratop Wallonia)	33
French Albums (SNEP)	12
Chart (2014)	Position
Belgian Albums (Ultratop Wallonia)	17
French Albums (SNEP)	75
Chart (2015)	Position
Canadian Albums (Billboard)	42

=== Singles ===
Year	Song	Credited performer(s)	Peak positions	Ref	Music video
Year	Song	Credited performer(s)	FRA	Ref	Music video
2013	"La belle vie"	Dany Brillant, Damien Sargue & Roch Voisine	95		

== Forever Gentlemen Volume 2 ==
Forever Gentlemen Vol. 2

Compilation album by Various artists
- Released: 24 October 2014
- Label: TF1 Musique

Various artists chronology
Forever Gentlemen (2013)	Forever Gentlemen Vol. 2 (2014)

Because of the immense success of the album, Forever Gentlemen Vol. 2 was released as a compilation album produced again by TF1 Musique and joining another set of well-known artists. The album was released on 24 October 2014, exactly a year after the release of the original, and includes tributes to crooners of the 1950s. The selection includes classics in English and French and has notable participation of Paul Anka in a number of the interpretations.

The album entered the SNEP French Albums Chart at number 3 in its first week of release.

Track #	Song title	Performer	Original artist / Made famous by or theme	Length
1	"L-O-V-E"	Corneille - Claire Keim & Roch Voisine		3:05
2	"Grands boulevards"	Dany Brillant, Antoine Duléry & Damien Sargue	Yves Montand	2:40
3	"That's Life"	Paul Anka & Ben l'Oncle Soul	Frank Sinatra	3:03
4	"La mer"	Vincent Niclo & Roch Voisine	Charles Trenet	3:22
5	"Cheek to Cheek"	Corneille & Tal	Written by Irving Berlin	3:16
6	"Mes emmerdes"	Dany Brillant, Philippe Lellouche & Damien Sargue		3:31
7	"Que reste-t-il de nos amours?" / "I Wish You Love"	Paul Anka & Claire Keim		3:13
8	"Ain't That a Kick in the Head"	Corneille - Sinclair	Dean Martin	2:33
9	"Syracuse"	Dany Brillant, Damien Sargue & Roch Voisine		2:51
10	"Strangers in the Night"	Paul Anka & Roch Voisine	Frank Sinatra	3:04
11	"C'est si bon"	Ben l'Oncle Soul - Sinclair	Eartha Kitt	3:15
12	"Everybody Loves Somebody"	Dany Brillant, Sofia Essaïdi & Bruce Johnson	Dean Martin	3:38
13	"Le soleil de ma vie"	Amir & Camille Lou	Brigitte Bardot / Sacha Distel	2:59
14	"Misty"	Sofia Essaïdi & Roch Voisine	Written by Erroll Garner	2:59

=== Weekly charts ===
Chart (2014)	Peak position
Belgian Albums (Ultratop Flanders)	164
Belgian Albums (Ultratop Wallonia)	3
French Albums (SNEP)	3
Swiss Albums (Schweizer Hitparade)	9

=== Year-end charts ===
Chart (2014)	Position
Belgian Albums (Ultratop Wallonia)	71
French Albums (SNEP)	54
Chart (2015)	Position
Belgian Albums (Ultratop Wallonia)	80
