= Suzette (song) =

1991 single by Dany Brillant

Single by Dany Brillant

from the album C'est ça qui est bon
- B-side: "Ma fiancée, elle est partie"
- Released: 1992
- Studio: Studio de la Grande Armée, Paris (recording); Studio d'Auteuil, Paris (mixing)
- Genre: Swing-jazz, chanson, pop rock
- Length: 3:52
- Label: Warner
- Songwriter(s): Dany Brillant
- Producer(s): Varda Kakon, Alain Pewzner, Daniel Lellauche

Dany Brillant singles chronology
"Suzette" (1992)	"Y'a qu'les filles qui m'intéressent" (1992)

"Suzette" is a 1986 song recorded by French singer Dany Brillant. Written by Brillant initially for a film in which it starred, it was released only six years later as his debut single, and included on his first studio album C'est ça qui est bon, on which it appears as the sixth track. Released in the last days of 1991, it was a top three hit in France in 1992 and became Dany Brillant's signature song.

== Background and release ==
In 1986, Brillant, then a student at Cours Florent and singer in the cabaret Aux Trois Mailletz, was hired to play in Francis Huster's film On a volé Charlie Spencer in which Béatrice Dalle played the character of Suzette. Brillant was to portray a young man singing a song by Frank Sinatra, but this was not possible for budget reasons, so the director's assistant asked him to create a new song, which Brillant wrote with the help of a rhyming dictionary from the Centre Beaubourg library, Paris. However, the role of Brillant and his song "Suzette", which he had performed dozens of times for the film, were removed in the final cut. Brillant continued to sing "Suzette" with his orchestra in his cabaret, proposing it to various record companies, but each time they refused it as they considered it old-fashioned; nevertheless, in 1990, a friend of Brillant helped him to meet a Warner director who came to the cabaret, which resulted in a contract and the song's release as a single.

== Lyrics and video ==
Lyrically, "Suzette" deals, in a marked retro style, with the narrator's love at first sight with Suzette and their romantic. The music video accompanying the song was inspired by the retro-vintage of the Jazz Age and the 1950s, the Parisian jazz clubs of Saint-Germain-des-Prés and the Paris Latin Quarter.

== Chart performance ==
In France, "Suzette" debuted at number 43 on the chart edition of 8 February 1992, entered the top ten six weeks later where it remained for 14 weeks with a peak at number three twice, and fell off the top 50 after 23 weeks of presence. It earned a silver disc, awarded by the Syndicat National de l'Édition Phonographique, and remained Brillant's most successful single. On the Eurochart Hot 100 Singles, it started at number 97 on 14 March 1992, reached number 20, its highest position, in its 14th week, and dropped from on the chart after 19 weeks.

== Track listings ==
- 7" single
1. "Suzette" — 3:51
2. "Ma fiancée, elle est partie" — 2:15
- CD single
1. "Suzette" — 3:51
2. "Ma fiancée, elle est partie" — 2:15
- Cassette
1. "Suzette" — 3:51
2. "Ma fiancée, elle est partie" — 2:15

== Personnel ==
- Arrangement — Alain Pewzner, Dany Brillant
- Engineer — Patrice Kung
- Producer — Daniel Lellouche, Varda Kakon, Alain Pewzner
- Lyrics and music — Dany Brillant
- Photography — Filippa Lidholm

== Charts and certifications ==
=== Weekly charts ===
Chart (1992)	Peak position
Europe (Eurochart Hot 100)	20
France (Airplay Chart [AM Stations])	5
France (SNEP)	3

=== Certifications ===
Certifications for "Suzette"
Region	Certification	Certified units/sales
France (SNEP)	Silver	125,000^{*}
^{*} Sales figures based on certification alone.

== Release history ==
Country	Date	Format	Label
France	1991	7" single	Warner
France	1991	CD single	Warner
France	1991	Cassette	Warner
