= Damien Sargue =

French pop singer (born 1981)

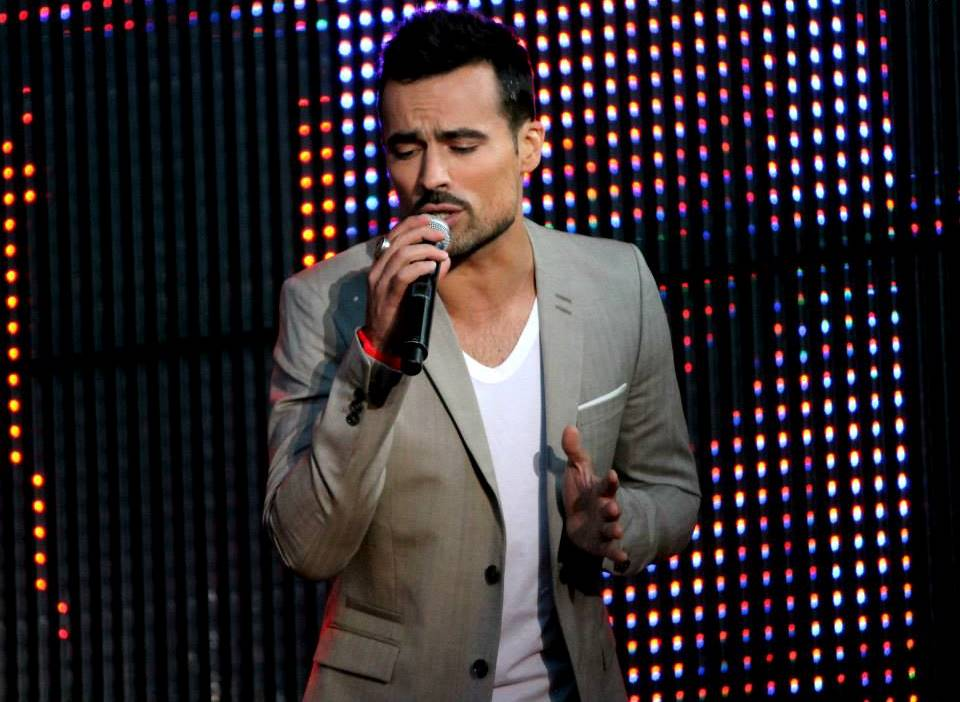
- Sargue in 2014
- Born: 26 June 1981 (age 44)
- Occupation: Singer
- Spouses: Joy Esther (divorced); Emilie Sudre (m. 2017)
- Children: 1

Damien Sargue (born 26 June 1981) is a French pop singer and actor. He is best known for his role as Romeo in Gérard Presgurvic's Roméo et Juliette, de la Haine à l'Amour.

== Career ==
A French native, Sargue grew up in Caen, Normandy, France with his mother Miriam, his father Pierre, brother Julien, and his sisters Julie and Sarah, until his parents divorced when he was only a year old. He originally wanted to practice karate as a child, but his mom registered him in song lessons in Caen Ecole des Variétés de Caen. He started his career as a singer in 1992 in the program Numéros 1 de Demain in France and with his first single Emmène-moi. Five years later, he auditioned in the show Notre-Dame de Paris for the character of a sculptor but that character was removed of the show, so they offered him to be an alternate for Phoebus and Gringoire. The year 1998 was his first time on stage in Palais des congrès de Paris, being on stage almost 80 times supplying Patrick Fiori or Bruno Pelletier.

His breakthrough role came in 2001 when he performed the principal role of Romeo Montague in Roméo et Juliette, de la Haine à l'Amour with Cécilia Cara in the role of Juliette Capulet. In 2004, he provided the French dub for Raoul de Chagny in The Phantom of the Opera by Joel Schumacher. His first solo, Merci was released that same year. 2006 saw him reprise the role of Romeo again in the Asia tour of Romeo et Juliette that launched in Korea.

In 2007, Sargue created his first album in Asia and the following year saw him have his first concert as a solo artist in Seoul, Korea on May 23. In 2010, he reprised the role of Romeo in the new version of Romeo et Juliette in Paris (Romeo et Juliette, Les enfants de Vérone). Two years later, he participated to the Jean-Jacques Goldman's tribute with Génération Goldman's album. He sang Né en 17 à Leidenstadt with Amaury Vassili, Anggun.

In 2013, Sargue participated in the fourth season of Danse avec les stars. He also joined the Forever Gentlemen's project in 2014, along with the Latin Lovers opposite Julio Iglesias Jr. and Nuno Resende plus others.

In 2016, he played Aramis in the French musical rendition of The Three Musketeers. In 2018, he once again reprised the role of Romeo in Roméo et Juliette for the Asia Tour in China.

== Personal life ==
When he was eleven, Sargue originally wanted his artistic name to be "Damien Danza", in relation to his favorite TV program Who's the Boss?, after actor Tony Danza.

Sargue was married to his Roméo et Juliette principal co-star Joy Esther in 2009, but the couple divorced a year later. In 2017, he married dancer Emilie Sudre, who was also in the Romeo et Juliette dance troupe, with whom he has a daughter, Billie-Rose, born in 2014.

== Discography ==
=== Singles ===
- Emmène-moi (1992)
- Les Rois du monde (2000 France No.1, Belgium No.1)
- Aimer with Cécilia Cara (2000 France No.2, Belgium No.2)
- On dit dans la rue (2000 France No.21, Belgium No.32)
- Merci (2004 France No.64)
- Quelque chose pour quelqu'un (2004)
- Elle vient quand elle vient (2005)
- Avoir 20 ans (Roméo et Juliette, 2010)
- On prie (Roméo et Juliette, 2010)
- Un faux départ (Single caritatif, 2013)
- La belle vie with Roch Voisone & Dany Brillant (2013 France No.95)
- Vous les femmes with Nuno Resende & Julio Iglesias Jr. (2014 France No.108)
- Solamente Tù with Pablo Alborán (2014)
- Un Jour (2015 France No.155)
- J'ai Besoin D'amour Comme Tout Le Monde (2016)

=== EP ===
- Pinocchio, la renaissance (2011)
  - Ca sert à quoi tout ça : Damien Sargue
  - Me déchaîner de toi : Frédéric Charter
  - A force d'amour : Aurore Delplace
  - Tout savoir : Damien Sargue, Aurore Delplace
  - Etre un homme : Stefanny Rodrigue

=== Albums ===
- Roméo et Juliette, de la haine à l'amour (2000 France No.1, Belgium No.1, Switzerland No.9)
- Roméo et Juliette, de la haine à l'amour: L'Integrale (2000 France No.4, Belgium No.30)
- Roméo et Juliette, de la haine à l'amour: Live (2001 France No.15, Belgium No.28)
- Damien Sargue (2007)
- Roméo et Juliette, les enfants de Vérone (2010 France No.80)
- Forever Gentlemen (2013 France No.2, Belgium No.2)
- Latin Lovers (2014 France No.7, Belgium No.13)
- Forever Gentlemen 2 (2014 France No.3, Belgium No.3, Switzerland No.9)
- Les Trois Mousquetaires (2016 France No.6, Belgium No.36)

== DVDs ==
- Romeo et Juliette (2000 DVD)
- Romeo et Juliette (2000 VHS)
- Romeo et Juliette, Les enfants de Vérone (2010,2011 DVD)
