= Roméo et Juliette (musical) =

2001 musical by Gérard Presgurvic

Romeo and Juliette: From Hate to Love
- Music: Gérard Presgurvic
- Lyrics: Gérard Presgurvic
- Basis: Romeo and Juliet by William Shakespeare
- Productions: 2001 Paris

Roméo et Juliette: de la Haine à l'Amour is a French musical based on William Shakespeare's play Romeo and Juliet, with music and lyrics by Gérard Presgurvic. It premiered in Paris on January 19, 2001. The production was directed and choreographed by Redha, with costumes designed by Dominique Borg and sets by Petrika Ionesco. The producers were Gérard Louvin, GLEM, and Universal Music. Since then, the musical has been performed in Verona, Rome, Canada, Antwerp, London, Amsterdam, Budapest, Szeged, Moscow, Vienna, Bucharest, Seoul, Pusan (South Korea), Taipei, Monterrey, Japan, Hong Kong, Shanghai, Portugal and Beijing, and has been translated into several languages, including Dutch, Italian, Hungarian, Russian, English, German, Spanish, Romanian, Japanese, Korean, Portuguese, and Slovak.

== Plot ==
Differences from Shakespeare's plot include that the nature of the lovers' deaths is different, depending on the production. New characters such as Death (French, Belgian, Japanese, Netherlands, Moscow and Chinese productions only) and the Poet (French production only) appear for dramatic effect. Lady Capulet has a greatly increased role and in the case of the Hungarian version, has an affair with her servant. The role of Tybalt has changed slightly from being purely dark to a more pitiful character because of his growing up with the hate and a dark childhood, as well as an unrequited attraction to Juliet.

=== Synopsis ===
Act 1

A long-standing feud between the two leading families of the city of Verona, the Montagues and the Capulets, regularly erupts into violence on the city's streets. Irritated, the Prince of Verona decrees, on pain of death, the absolute prohibition on fighting in the city (Vérone). While Lady Capulet and Lady Montague denounce the violence of the two clans (La haine), Romeo (the sole heir of the Montagues) and Juliet (the daughter of the Capulets) are hopelessly in search for love (Un jour).

At the Capulets, a ball is being held so that Juliet can meet Count Paris, who asked Lord Capulet for her hand (La demande en mariage, Tu dois te marier). In Verona, Romeo and his friends, Benvolio and Mercutio, hang about the streets (Les rois du monde, La folie). Romeo is afraid of... he doesn't really know, but he's afraid (J'ai peur). In the hope of distracting him, Benvolio and Mercutio persuade him to accompany them, in disguise, to a ball being held at the house of the Capulets (Le bal). At his first sight of Juliet, the daughter of the Capulets, Romeo instantly falls in love with her, without knowing who she is (L'amour heureux). Tybalt recognize Romeo and informs Juliet's parents. Romeo and Juliet learn from the Nurse who they are (Le bal 2). Tybalt, broken (he loves Juliet in secret), acknowledges that he is the son of hate and contempt (C'est pas ma faute).

After the ball, Juliet takes refuge in her room and dreams of Romeo (Le poète), who woos her at great personal risk in the Capulets' garden. They exchange lovers' vows and plan to marry in secret as soon as possible (Le balcon). Knowing that their families will never agree to their marriage, Romeo meets Friar Lawrence and asks him to marry them. He accepts hoping that this union will reconcile the two families (Par amour).

In the morning, Romeo meets his friends and tells the Nurse, whom everyone makes fun of (Les beaux, les laids), that Friar Lawrence will marry them the following afternoon. The Nurse, who deeply loves Juliet as her own daughter, announces the good news to Juliet (Et voilà qu'elle aime). Finally, Romeo and Juliet are married (Aimer).

Act 2

The next day, Benvolio and Mercutio meet Romeo: they accuse him of betrayal (On dit dans la rue). Out on the streets of Verona, Tybalt - unaware of his new blood tie to Romeo - searches for Romeo (C'est le jour) and when he finds him, challenges him to a fight, which Romeo refuses (Le duel). Mercutio takes up the challenge and is mortally wounded. Driven by guilt, grief, and youthful-hotheadedness, Romeo kills Tybalt (Mort de Mercutio). The two families, plunged into mourning, ask the Prince for revenge (La vengeance). Finally, he banishes Romeo from Verona and thinks about the political power (Le pouvoir). In her bedroom, Juliet learns the bad news from the Nurse. She is torn between the love for her cousin and for her husband. Romeo goes to Friar Lawrence's. He thinks banishment is worse than death (Duo du désespoir).

Romeo and Juliet spend their wedding night together and Romeo makes his escape to Mantua (Le chant de l'alouette). Shortly after her husband has left, Juliet is informed by her parents that she is to be married to Paris. She refuses and they threaten to disown her (Demain). Upset, Lord Capulet sings about the love he has for his daughter (Avoir une fille). In her room, Juliet asks why she has to obey (Pourquoi). In Mantua, Romeo thinks of Juliet. In desperation, she turns to Friar Lawrence, who devises an ingenious plan, which he hopes will ultimately bring a happy ending for both the lovers and their two families (Sans elle).

Juliet appears to go along with the marriage plans but, in the night before the wedding, she takes the drug prepared by Friar Lawrence which makes her appear dead (Le poison). Juliet is duly laid in the family vault, hoping to wake up to find Romeo waiting for her. Unfortunately, The Friar's message telling Romeo of the plan somehow goes astray, and instead he hears only from Benvolio that his wife Juliet is dead (Comment lui dire).

Grief-stricken, he breaks into the Capulet vault, finds what he believes to be the mortal remains of his beloved, and takes poison to be reunited with her in death (Mort de Roméo). Soon afterwards, Juliet awakes to find her husband dead and she stabs herself with Romeo's dagger (La mort de Juliette). Friar Lawrence enters the vault and finds the two lovers dead. He complains to God (J'sais plus). When the whole story is told, the two devastated families agree henceforward to live in peace (Coupables).

== Reception ==
In the two years since opening at Palais des Congres in Paris, Roméo et Juliette sold more tickets in France than 1998 musical Notre Dame de Paris.

== Songs ==
Act I

- “Ouverture” – Gérard Presgurvic
- "Vérone" – Le Prince de Vérone
- "La Haine" – Lady Capulet & Lady Montaigu
- "Un Jour" – Roméo & Juliette
- "La Demande en mariage" – Pâris & Comte Capulet
- "Tu dois te marier" – Lady Capulet & La Nurse
- "Les Rois du monde" – Roméo, Benvolio & Mercutio
- "J'ai peur" – Roméo
- "La Folie" –Roméo, Benvolio & Mercutio
- "Le Bal" (Instrumental)
- "L'Amour heureux" – Roméo & Juliette
- "Le Bal 2" (Instrumental)
- "C'est pas ma faute" – Tybalt
- "Le Poète" – Le Poète & Juliette
- "Le Balcon" – Roméo & Juliette
- "Par amour" – Frère Laurent, Roméo & Juliette
- "Les Beaux, les Laids" – La Nurse, Benvolio & Mercutio
- "Et voilà qu'elle aime" – La Nurse
- "Aimer" – Roméo & Juliette

Act II

- "On dit dans la rue" – Roméo, Mercutio & Benvolio
- "C'est le jour" – Tybalt
- "Le Duel" – Mercutio, Tybalt, & Roméo
- "Mort de Mercutio" – Mercutio & Roméo
- "La Vengeance" – Comte Capulet, Lady Montaigu, Le Prince de Vérone & Roméo
- "Le Pouvoir" – Le Prince de Vérone
- "Duo du désespoir" – La Nurse & Frère Laurent
- "Le Chant de l'alouette" – Roméo & Juliette
- "Demain" – Comte Capulet, Lady Capulet, Juliette & La Nurse
- "Avoir une fille" – Comte Capulet
- "Pourquoi" – Juliette
- "Sans Elle" – Roméo & Juliette
- "Le Poison" – Juliette
- "Comment lui dire" – Benvolio
- "Mort de Roméo" – Roméo
- "La Mort de Juliette" – Juliette
- "J'sais plus" – Frère Laurent
- "Coupables" (final) – Lady Capulet, Lady Montaigu, La Nurse & La Troupecurt

Notes :
- "La folie" and "Pourquoi" were sung until Jun. 27, 2001. They can be found on the L'Integrale recording and the second disc of some DVD recordings.
- "Sans elle" is sung only by Roméo on the cast recording, but by Roméo and Juliette during the show
- Curtain calls were "Aimer", and "Les rois du monde"

== Original French Cast ==
- Romeo: Damien Sargue/Vincent Niclo
- Juliette: Cécilia Cara
- Benvolio: Grégori Baquet
- Mercutio: Philippe D'Avilla
- Tybalt: Tom Ross
- Lady Montague: Eléonore Beaulieu
- Lady Capulet: Isabelle Ferron/Karoline Blandin
- The Nurse: Réjane Perry
- Lord Capulet: Sébastien El Chato
- Friar Laurent: Jean Claude-Hadida
- The Prince: Frederic Charter
- Paris: Essaï
- The Poet: Serge Le Borgne
- Death: Anne Mano

== International casts ==
=== Austria ===
- Romeo: Lukas Perman
- Juliette: Marjan Shaki
- Benvolio: Mathias Edenborn
- Mercutio: Rasmus Borkowski
- Tybalt: Mark Seibert
- Lady Montague: Zuzanna Maurery
- Lady Capulet: Annette Wimmer
- The Nurse: Carin Filipčić
- Lord Capulet: Paul Vaes
- Friar Laurent: Charlie Serrano
- The Prince: Boris Pfeifer
- Paris: Thomas Mülner

=== Italy ===
- Romeo: Davide Merlini
- Juliette: Giulia Luzi
- Benvolio: Riccardo Maccaferri
- Mercutio: Luca Giacomelli Ferrarini
- Tybalt: Gianluca Merolli
- Lady Montague: Roberta Faccani
- Lady Capulet: Barbara Cola
- The Nurse: Silvia Querci
- Lord Capulet: Vittorio Matteucci
- Friar Laurent: Giò Tortorelli
- The Prince: Leonardo Di Minno
- Paris: Nicolò Noto
- Le Chat: Tiwany Lepetitgalande

=== Portugal ===
- Romeo: Samuel de Albuquerque / Miguel Ribeiro
- Juliette: Mariana Castro / Inês Branco
- Benvolio: Diogo Bach / Gonçalo Lima
- Mercutio: Camila Ribeiro / Érica Liane
- Tybalt: Martim Fornetti / Nuno Jacinto
- Lady Montague: Rute Banha / Cláudia Soares
- Lady Capulet: Sara César / Sofia de Castro
- The Nurse: Maria Inês Courinha / Mafalda Falcão
- Lord Capulet: Artur Marques
- Friar Laurent: Bruno Ribeiro
- The Prince: Diogo Oliveira
- Paris: Samuel Cardita
- The Poet: Inês de Campos / Teresa Amorim
- Death: Beatriz Teixeira
- Love: Mariana Dominguez / Mariana Gomes

== Productions ==
Multiple productions of the musical have occurred.

=== Quebec ===
The Quebec production opened at Théâtre Saint-Denis, Montreal in June 2002 with the roles of Roméo and Juliette played by Hugo and Ariane Gauthier respectively. Direction and choreography was by Jean Grand-Maître, a former dancer, who along with Gauthier, hails from Aylmer, Quebec. Due to differences between Quebec and French audiences, Grand-Maître said that the production would be "completely different" from its French counterpart; maintaining the same music and costumes by Francaise Dominique Borg but employing different choreography and staging. Grand-Maître aimed for an intimate performance, in contrast to the "huge" and "much more operatic" French version. More than 2,000 actors applied to fill the eleven roles with five understudies. In the opening month, the Montreal press was highly critical of the music.

=== Others ===
- "Roméo et Juliette: de la Haine à l'Amour" (Jan. 19, 2001 - Dec. 21, 2001)/(June 18, 2002 - Sep. 21, 2002) -- (Paris, Palais des Congrès) and French-Canadian tour (opening at Montreal, Théâtre St-Denis).
- "Romeo en Julia: van Haat tot Liefde" (Sep. 22, 2002 - March 16, 2003)/(Jan. 27, 2004 - Apr. 25, 2004) -- (Antwerp, Stadsschouwburg Theatre) and Netherlands Tour. The cast included Davy Gilles as Romeo and Veerle Casteleyn as Juliet. Direction and Choreography were by Redha.
- "Romeo and Juliet: the Musical" (Oct. 18, 2002 - Feb. 8, 2003) -- (London, Piccadilly Theatre). The cast included Andrew Bevis as Romeo and Lorna Want (later Zara Dawson) as Juliet. The translation was by Don Black, direction and choreography were by David Freeman, and musical staging was by Redha. Casting Director was Anne Vosser.
- "Rómeó és Júlia" (Jan. 23, 2004 - May 21, 2018) -- (Budapest, Budapest Operetta Theatre). The cast had included, as Romeo (Rómeó), Dolhai Attila (01/2004-), György Rózsa Sándor (01/2004-06/2005, 09/2006-06/2007), Bálint Ádám (09/2004-06/2008), Száraz Tamás (09/2006-), and Szerényi László (09/2008-); and as Juliet (Júlia), Szinetár Dóra (01/2004-), Mahó Andrea (01/2004-06/2006), Vágó Bernadett (09/2006-), and Vágó Zsuzsi (09/2006-). Direction was by Kerényi Miklós Gábor, and choreography was by Duda Éva.
- January 27, 2004 (Rotterdam, Nieuwe Luxor Theatre). In the Netherlands / Belgium tour version, the cast included Davy Gilles as Romeo and Jennifer Van Brenk as Juliet. Direction and choreography were by Redha.
- "Roméo i Juliette: ot Nenavisti do Lubvi" (May 20, 2004 - June 12, 2006) -- Russian (Moscow, Moscow Operetta Theatre). The cast included Eduard Shuljevskii as Romeo (Ромео) and Sopho Nizharadze as Juliet (Джульетта).
- "Romeo und Julia: das Musical" (Feb. 24, 2005 - July 8, 2006) -- Austrian (Vienna, Raimund Theatre). The cast included Lukas Perman as Romeo and Marjan Shaki as Juliet. Direction and choreography were by Redha.
- "Roméo et Juliette 2007" (Jan. 20, 2007 - Mar. 21, 2007)/(Apr. 5, 2007 - Apr. 21, 2007) -- Asia Tour. The cast included Damien Sargue as Roméo and Joy Esther as Juliette. Direction and choreography were by Redha.
- "Romeo y Julieta: el Musical" (Aug. 28, 2008 - Oct. 19, 2008) -- Mexico (Monterrey, Espacio Verona/Parque Funidora). The cast included Ángelo Saláis as Romeo and Melissa Barrera as Juliet. Direction was by Marcelo González and choreography was by Miguel Sahagún.
- "Romeo si Julieta ( April 30, 2009 - February 15, 2015 ) -- Romania (Bucharest, Teatrul National de Opereta). The cast included Jorge/Mihai Mos/Vlad Robu as Romeo, Simona Nae/Diana Nitu as Juliet.
- "Roméo and Juliette" 「ロミオとジュリエット」 (July 10, 2010 - July 26, 2010; August 2, 2010 - August 24, 2010 ) -- Japan (Umeda Arts Theatre; Hakataza Theatre). Presented by the all-female Takarazuka Revue, the production was performed by Star Troupe, the cast included Reon Yuzuki as Romeo and Nene Yumesaki as Juliet. Adaption and direction by Shuuichiro Koike.
- "Roméo and Juliette" 「ロミオとジュリエット」 (Jan. 1, 2011 - Jan. 31, 2011; Feb. 17 - Mar. 20, 2011) -- Japan (Takarazuka Grand Theater; Tokyo Takarazuka Theater). Presented by the all-female Takarazuka Revue, the production will be performed by Snow Troupe, the cast will include Kei Otozuki as Romeo, and Mimi Maihane/Ami Yumeka as Juliet on a rotating basis. Direction by Shuuichiro Koike.
- "Roméo and Juliette" 「ロミオとジュリエット」 (May 31, 2013 - July 8, 2013; July 26, 2013 - August 25, 2013) -- Japan (Takarazuka Grand Theater; Tokyo Takarazuka Theater). Presented by the all-female Takarazuka Revue, the production was performed by Star Troupe, the cast included Reon Yuzuki as Romeo and Nene Yumesaki as Juliet. Adaption and direction by Shuuichiro Koike.
- "Romeo e Giulietta: Ama e Cambia il mondo" (Oct. 2013) -- Italy (Verone, Arena di Verona)/(Nov. 2013) -- Italy (Rome, Gran Teatro).
- "Romeu e Julieta: do Ódio ao Amor" (Sep. 19, 2019 - Oct. 20, 2019) -- Portugal (Lisboa, Auditório Casino Estoril). Rotating cast for most characters. Adaption and direction by Sofia de Castro, choreography by David Bernardino and João Nascimento.
- "Roméo and Juliette" 「ロミオとジュリエット」(Jan. 14, 2021 - March 29, 2021; April 16, 2021 - May 23, 2021) -- Japan (Takarazuka Grand Theater; Tokyo Takarazuka Theater). Presented by the all-female Takarazuka Revue, the production was performed by Star Troupe, the cast included Makoto Rei as Romeo and Hitomi Maisora as Juliet. Adaption and direction by Shuuichiro Koike.

== Differences among productions ==
=== Characters ===
- French Version: There are 15 title characters in the original production: Romeo, Juliet, Benvolio, Mercutio, Tybalt, Lady Montague, Lady Capulet, Lord Capulet, The Nurse, Friar Laurence, The Prince, Paris, The Poet, The Mute, and Death.
- French Canadian Version: There is no Poet or Death.
- Belgian/Netherlands Tour Version: There is no Poet.
- British Version: There is no Poet or Death. However, there is a Lord Montague(a silent one).
- Hungarian Version: There is no Poet or Death. Paris has a greater role and two new scenes.
- Russian Version: There is no Poet. Death is played by a male.
- Austrian Version: There is no Poet or Death.
- Asia Tour: There is no Poet, and while there's a Paris, he doesn't sing.
- Romanian Version: There is no Poet and no Death. Paris has a greater role and two new scenes
- Japanese Version: There is no Poet. Death is split into two characters: a male one that is "death" (死) and a female one that is "love" (愛) (silent dancers, working against each other in the story line). There are also Lord Montague (a silent one) and Peter (nurse's servant). In the 2011 production, a character of John (a monk) was introduced.
- Portuguese Version: There is the character Love (silent, dancer, working against Death in the story line). Mercutio is female in the Portuguese production, her birth name was Zora which she changed to Mercutio to distance herself from her family. Mercutio is very masculine and breaks the expected gender roles in the highly male dominated society of the story, being referred to with both masculine and feminine pronouns.

=== Songs ===
- Belgian/Netherlands Tour Version: There are no versions of "Le Poete", "Par Amour", "Le Pouvoir", "La Folie", or "Pourquoi?". However, there is a "Verona Reprise" which the Prince sings, after a shortened "Het Lied Van De Leeuwerik" (Le Chant de L'Alouette). Julia has a short reprise of "Ooit Komt" (Un Jour) just before "De Koningen" (Les Rois du Monde).
- French Canadian: "C'est Pas Ma Faute" and "Le Balcon" are switched. There is no "Le Poete", "Le Pouvoir", "La Folie", or "Pourquoi?".
- British Version: The orchestrations are very different from the other productions. There are no English versions of "J'ai Peur", "Le Poison", "La Folie", or "Pourquoi?". "Le Pouvoir" was replaced by a "Verona" reprise. "Sans Elle" was replaced with an "All Days Are the Same Without You" reprise, and there is a reprise of "Ugly or Beautiful" (Les Beaux, les Laids) and "Born to Hate" (La Haine) after it. "C'est Pas Ma Faute" has been replaced with "She Can't See Me" along with different music. "Guilty" (Coupables) was turned into a "Fools" (Duo Du Desespoir) reprise.
- Hungarian Version: The order of the songs has been changed and there are some new songs which are reworkings of existing tunes. There are 3 reprises, Paris has his own song, (to the tune of "La Folie") and he shares a duet with Romeo (a "Le Duel" reprise). "La Haine" is about Lady Capulet and Montague insulting each other instead of resenting the feud. There is no "Pourquoi", "Avoir une Fille" or "Le Poete".
- Russian Version: Orchestrations are the same (with a slight variation of "Le Bal 1"). There are no Russian versions of "La Folie", "Pourquoi?", "Le Poete", and "Par Amour". However, there are versions of "Par Amour" and "Pourquoi?" on the cast recording. Like the Belgian/Netherlands production, "Utro" (Le Chant de L'Alouette) was also shortened, and the Prince sings "Vlast" (Le Pouvoir) after it.
- Austrian Version: Some of the music is reminiscent to the British, but most stays true to the original score. Julia has a short reprise of "Einmal" (Un Jour), just before "Herrscher der Welt" (Les Rois du Monde). There is no Austrian version of "Le Poete", "Par Amour", "La Folie", or "Pourquoi?". "Der Gesang der Lerche" has been shortened, and there is a "Verona" reprise sung by The Prince after "Das Gift" (Le Poison).
- Asia Tour Version: The arrangements are a mix between the Austrian and the original French. "Tu Dois Te Marier", "On Dit Dans la Rue", and "Le Pouvoir" were cut from the show. New songs include "Grosse", "A La Vie, A La Mort", "Je Veux L'Aimer", "La Folie", (originally cut from the French production, then brought back) and "Verone 2". "La Demande En Mariage" has been turned into a solo song sung by Lord Capulet.
- Romanian Version: The order of the songs is changed and there are three new songs, reworkings of existing tunes. Paris has his own song on the tunes of "La Folie" and shares a duet with Romeo on "Le Duel". There is no "Pourquoi", "Avoir une Fille", "Le pouvoir" or "Le Poete"
- Japanese Version: In the 2010 production Tybalt is a second lead role, so he gets another theme song by the name "Tybalt".
- Portuguese Version: "C'est Pas Ma Faute" was replaced by "Quem Sou Eu?" ("Chi son io?" from the Italian version). "Mantova - Verona" (Instrumental track from the Italian version) was added after "Comment lui dire", it's a fight/dance duet between Death and Love for Friar Laurence's letter which Death rips in the end. "Coupables" was shortened to only the second half of the song. There is no "Tu dois te marier", "La Folie", "Par amour", "Le Pouvoir", "Pourquoi" or "Sans Elle".

=== Costume Designs ===
Costume designs in the various productions are influenced by local renaissance costume traditions.

- French Version: The costumes are 14th century with a touch of 20th century and are largely made of leather. The costumes of the Montagues are in shades of blue while the Capulets' are in shades of red. Costumes dignitaries of Verona are brown (Friar Laurence), gray and black (The Prince), and golden (Paris).
- French Canadian Version: The costumes are exactly the same as the French version, except that of Juliet's.
- Belgian/Netherlands Tour Version: Most of the costumes are the same as the French version, excepting those of Lady Montague, Friar Laurence, the Nurse, Mercutio, the ball gowns, and the wedding of Juliet.
- British Version: The costumes from this production are very different from the French and Dutch. Generally they are a mixture of Renaissance, Victorian, Elizabethan, and 20th century. The colors for the Capulet's are dark blue and white while the Montague's are dark red and black.
- Hungarian Version: The Hungarian costumes are perhaps the most different from all the productions. Some are reminiscent to the film Moulin Rouge, some have medieval connotations, and some are futuristic (like Benvolio's).
- Russian Version: Costumes are a mix of French, Belgian, and new design (like that of Death's).
- Austrian Version: The original designer of the French version, Dominique Borg, seemed to have gone with a more futuristic feel to the costumes in this production. Skin-tight and vibrant, they still perceptibly retain that 14th century touch.
- Asia Tour Version: The Asian Tour costumes are different from the original French. Most are inspired by the film Moulin Rouge. The Montague boys wear colorful trench coats while the costumes of the ball are distinctly Roman. Others are similar to the costumes of the Hungarian version.
- Romanian Version: The costumes are similar to those in the Hungarian version.
- Japanese Version: The costumes are close to the fashion of the Austrian and Asia tour productions. Romeo and Juliette have the most costume changes. Montagues are seen in shades of blue (and sometimes green-blue) and the Capulets in red. The Prince wears silver and gold and Paris light silver with brown details. The ball outfits are white, with only blue or red touches on their masks to define them as Montagues or Capulets, Paris' mask has orange and yellow on it. Romeo is seen with his trademark Montague blue costume, the white for the ball, a baby-blue one with light brown shirt and another outfit of brown pants and boots and a light blue shirt. Juliette is seen with white and pink gowns, a white dress for the ball and her trademark Capulet red dress. Death wears a black tail tuxedo, with asymmetric tails, his costume is combined with a silver-white long haired wig and occasionally a tribal tattoo on his right cheek. Love wears a silk, light pink gown.
- Portuguese Version: Set in a post-apocalyptic world, the clothes are ripped and use several different fabrics, except for the high status characters (Prince, Paris, Ladies, Lord, and Juliet). Capulets wear all black clothes and makeup in a goth like style, Juliet wears a brown leather skirt, a black and red dress for the ball and a white dress on her death (what would've been her wedding dress). Montagues wear very colourful clothes and makeup, Romeo and Lady Montague wear blue (including makeup), Benvolio wears green makeup, Mercutio wears red and pink makeup and hair. The Prince wears a red cape and Paris wears a red Jacket. The Poet wears a flowy light pink dress with flowers and leaves, nature inspired body paint with shades of pink, green, brown and white and a gold tiara. Death wears black and purple body paint with a black feather set, Love wears white and pink body paint with a white feather set.

=== The Deaths of Romeo and Juliet ===
Below are descriptions of differences among productions in the treatment of the deaths of Romeo and Juliet.

- Original French production: After Romeo sings "Mort de Romeo", the character known as "Death" kills Romeo with a kiss. When Juliet wakes up to find him dead, she sings "La Mort de Juliette". Death then hands her Romeo's dagger, which she uses to kill herself. The Belgian/Dutch version follows this treatment as do the Russian/Asia Tour versions with some slight variation.
- French Canadian Version: After singing "Mort de Romeo", Romeo drinks a poison and falls lifeless in front of Juliet's "death bed"; Juliet then finds him dead, and with his head on her lap she sings "La Mort de Juliette" and then kills herself with Romeo's dagger.
- British Version: Romeo and Juliet both kill themselves with Romeo's dagger.
- Hungarian Version: Taking Juliet into a harness, Romeo hangs himself as he is strapped to Juliet. Juliet kills herself with Romeo's dagger, however she slits her wrists instead of plunging the dagger into her heart.
- Russian Version: Same as the French production.
- Austrian Version: Romeo drinks a vial of poison, and similar to Romeo + Juliet, Juliet wakes up just in time to watch him die. She kills herself with Romeo's dagger.
- Asia Tour Version: Same as the Austrian version. Romeo drinks a vial of poison after singing "Mort de Romeo", with Juliet waking up just in time to see him die. After singing "La Mort de Juliette", she uses Romeo's dagger to kill herself.
- Romanian Version: Same as the Hungarian version.
- Japanese Version: After singing "Mort de Romeo", Romeo drinks a vial of poison and falls dead next to Juliet. Juliet wakes up and sings "La Mort de Juliette", believing that Romeo is still alive and is sleeping next to her. Juliet later discovers that Romeo is actually dead and kills herself with his dagger. Additionally, after the last song they dance in an "afterlife" under "Aimer" reprise, with "Death" and "Love" also uniting as forever intertwined.
- Italian version: Similar to the Austrian production and therefore that of Romeo + Juliet. She wakes up as Romeo is dying, having just drunk a vial of poison. Romeo dies in her arms. Juliet then sings "La Mort de Juliette", kisses Romeo and kills herself with his dagger.
- Portuguese Version: After singing "Mort de Romeo", Romeo drinks a vial of poison handed to him by Death who gives him a kiss right before he falls dead next to Juliet. Juliet wakes up to find Romeo dead next to her, after singing "La Mort de Juliette", Death places Romeo's dagger in front of her which she plunges into her heart.
