= Dany Brillant =

French singer

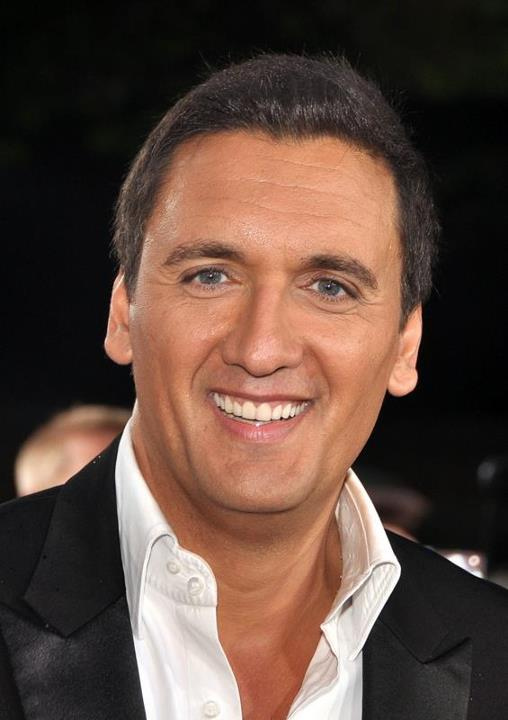
- Dany Brillant (2012)

Background information
- Born: Daniel Cohen-Biran; 28 December 1965 (age 60); Tunis, Tunisia
- Origin: French singer of Jewish Tunisian origin
- Genres: Pop, Salsa
- Occupations: Singer, songwriter, record producer, musician
- Instruments: Vocals, guitar
- Years active: 1985 – present
- Website: danybrillant.com

Dany Brillant (French: [da.ni bʁi.jɑ̃]; né Daniel Cohen-Biran; born 28 December 1965 in Tunis), is a French singer of a Jewish-Tunisian origin.

Born in Tunis, his parents immigrated to France while he was a newborn infant. They settled in Sainte-Geneviève-des-Bois near Paris. His uncle Nathan, was a famous luth player and interpreter of oriental music. At age 12, Dany Brilliant's family moved to Paris and at 14 his grandfather gave him a guitar. He started performing at various events, including important debut at cabaret "Aux Trois Maillets" where he got his artistic name. His adopted name Brillant comes after Jacques Boni, the owner of the cabaret invited him to stage by saying: "Dany! Sois brillant!" (Dany! be brilliant!).

In June 2005, Brillant appeared on Les stars chantent leurs idoles, on France 2, alongside stars such as Julio Iglesias and Il Divo.

== Discography ==
=== Studio albums ===
Title	Year	Peak positions			Certification
Title	Year	FRA	BEL (Wa)	SWI	Certification
C'est ça qui est bon	1991	101	—	—	
C'est toi	1993	—	—	—	
Havana	1996	10	—	—	
Nouveau jour	1999	19	—	—	
Dolce Vita	2001	9	14	—	
C'est ça qui est bon	2002	101	—	—	
Jazz... à la Nouvelle Orléans	2004	5	9	—	
Casino	2005	11	28	—	
Histoire d'un amour	2007	3	6	44	Mü-Yap: Gold
Viens dancer	2009	83	—	—	
Puerto Rico	2009	2	10	93	
Viens à Saint-Germain	2012	25	15	—	
Le dernier romantique	2014	5	6	—	
Rock and Swing	2018	10	9	64	
Dany Brillant chante Aznavour - La Bohème	2020	23	13	—	
Dany Brillant chante Aznavour en duo	2021	—	4	—	
Seventies	2024	—	130	—	

=== Compilation albums ===
Title	Year	Peak positions	Certification
Title	Year	FRA	Certification
Dany Brillant Best Of	2011	—	
Tant qu'il y aura des femmes - l'intégrale	2014	38	

=== Singles ===
(selective charting songs on SNEP)

Title	Year	Peak positions	Albums
Title	Year	FRA	Albums
"Suzette"	1992	3	
"Y'a qu'les filles qui m'intéressent"	1992	40	
"Quand je vois tes yeux"	1996	21	
"Dieu" (remix)	2000	65	
"Tant qu'il y aura des femmes"	2002	47	
"Tu vuo' fa l'americano"	2002	65	
"La belle vie" (with Damien Sargue and Roch Voisine)	2013	95	
"C'est l'amour qui rend heureux"	2018		

== Filmography ==
=== Films ===
- 1995: Le Nouveau Monde (English title New World as the singer)
- 1996: Des nouvelles du bon Dieu
- 2004: Les seins de ma prof d'anglais as Monsieur Lambert
- 2006: Changement d'adresse as Julien
- 2008: Astérix aux Jeux olympiques (English title Asterix at the Olympic Games)
- 2008: Le Grand Alibi (English title The Great Alibi) as Michel the taxi driver and the factotum of Léa
- 2009: Fais-moi plaisir! as Rudolph
- 2012: La Vérité si je mens! 3 as himself

=== Television ===
- 2004: Les Cordier, juge et flic (TV series) as Lucas (Cordier's cousin)
- 2008: Roméro et Juliette (TV film) as lead actor Patrice Roméro
