= Cécilia Cara =

French actress and singer

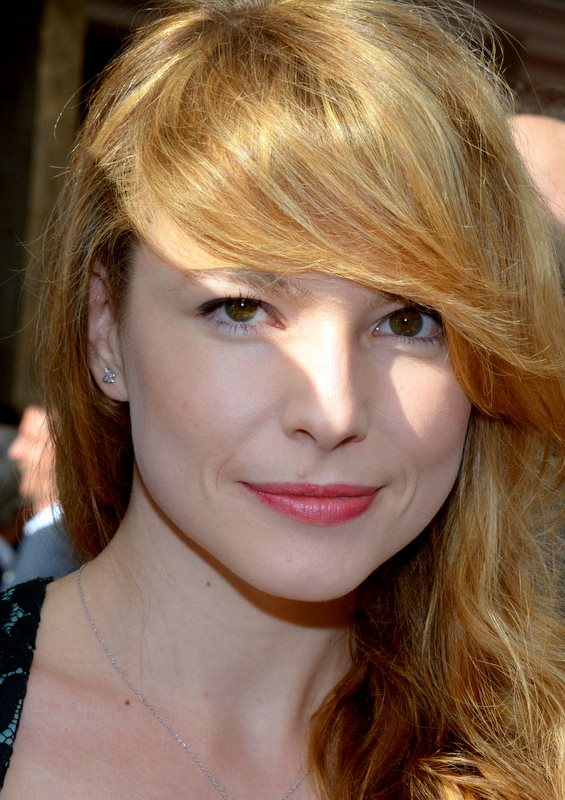
- Cara in 2014

Background information
- Born: 5 June 1984 (age 42); Cannes, France
- Occupations: Actress, singer
- Years active: 2001–present
- Website: www.ceciliacara.fr

Cécilia Cara (born 5 June 1984) is a French actress and singer. She is best known for playing the role of Juliet in the French musical Romeo and Juliet after being spotted on talent show Graines de star.

== Career ==
During her time in Roméo et Juliette, she recorded duets with French recording artist Florent Pagny (L'air du Temps), as well as former Boyzone member Ronan Keating (Je T'aime Plus Que Tout).

Cara's first feature role was as Alice in the French movie Le Carton. In 2005, she finished a movie-short called "Droit au cœur", in which she played the lead role of a Love Angel named Jasmine who fell in love with a young man on earth. Cara was also given the task in 2004 of vocally dubbing the role Christine Daaé for the French cinema release of Andrew Lloyd Webber's musical The Phantom of the Opera.

In 2023, she was featured in the song 'La vaguelette' as part of the musical score for the video game Genshin Impact, recorded by HOYO-MiX.

== Filmography ==
- Roméo et Juliette, de la Haine à l'Amour (Juliette Capulet) (2002)
- Le Carton (Alice) (2004)
- Droit au cœur (Jasmine) (2005)
- Andrew Lloyd Webber's Le Fantôme de L'Opéra (voice of Christine Daaé)
- Joséphine, ange gardien TV series (1 episode: "Chasse aux fantômes") (2010)
- Nina TV Series (1 episode: "La dernière épreuve") (2015)
- Camping Paradise TV Series (1 episode: "La colo au camping") (2016)
- Meurtres à... TV Series (2021)
- Crime à Ramatuelle (2022)

== Discography ==
=== Albums ===
- Noël ensemble (Compilation. She sings in "Noël ensemble" and "Ava Maria")
- Roméo et Juliette: de la Haine à l'Amour (Highlights)
- Roméo et Juliette: de la Haine à l'Amour (L'Integrale)
- Roméo et Juliette: de la Haine à l'Amour (En Live)

=== Singles ===
- Aimer
- Les Rois du Monde (B-Side "Un Jour")
- Vérone (B-Side "L'Amour Heureux")
- Avoir une Fille (B-Side "La Mort de Juliette")
- Comment Lui Dire (B-Side "Pourquoi?" live)
- L'air du Temps (Duet with Florent Pagny)
- Je T'aime Plus Que Tout (Duet with Ronan Keating)
- Donne-Moi (Back-up vocals)
- Le Dernier Reflet (B-Side "Et Je Danse")
- Paris-Bogota
- Me Acerco a Tu Boca (Steed Watt Remix)
- La vaguelette (HOYO-MiX)
