= Gérard Presgurvic =

French popular composer (born 1953)

Gérard Presgurvic (born 1953) is a French popular composer. He was the author of 1980s pop hits "Chacun fait c'qui lui plait" and "Marre de cette nana-là", but is best known for the 2001 musical spectacle Roméo et Juliette, de la haine à l'amour.

His other works include composing for Pause-café (TV series), Omer et le fils de l'étoile (TV series), Commissaire Moulin (TV series), and L'ex (TV movie).
