= Yannick (rapper) =

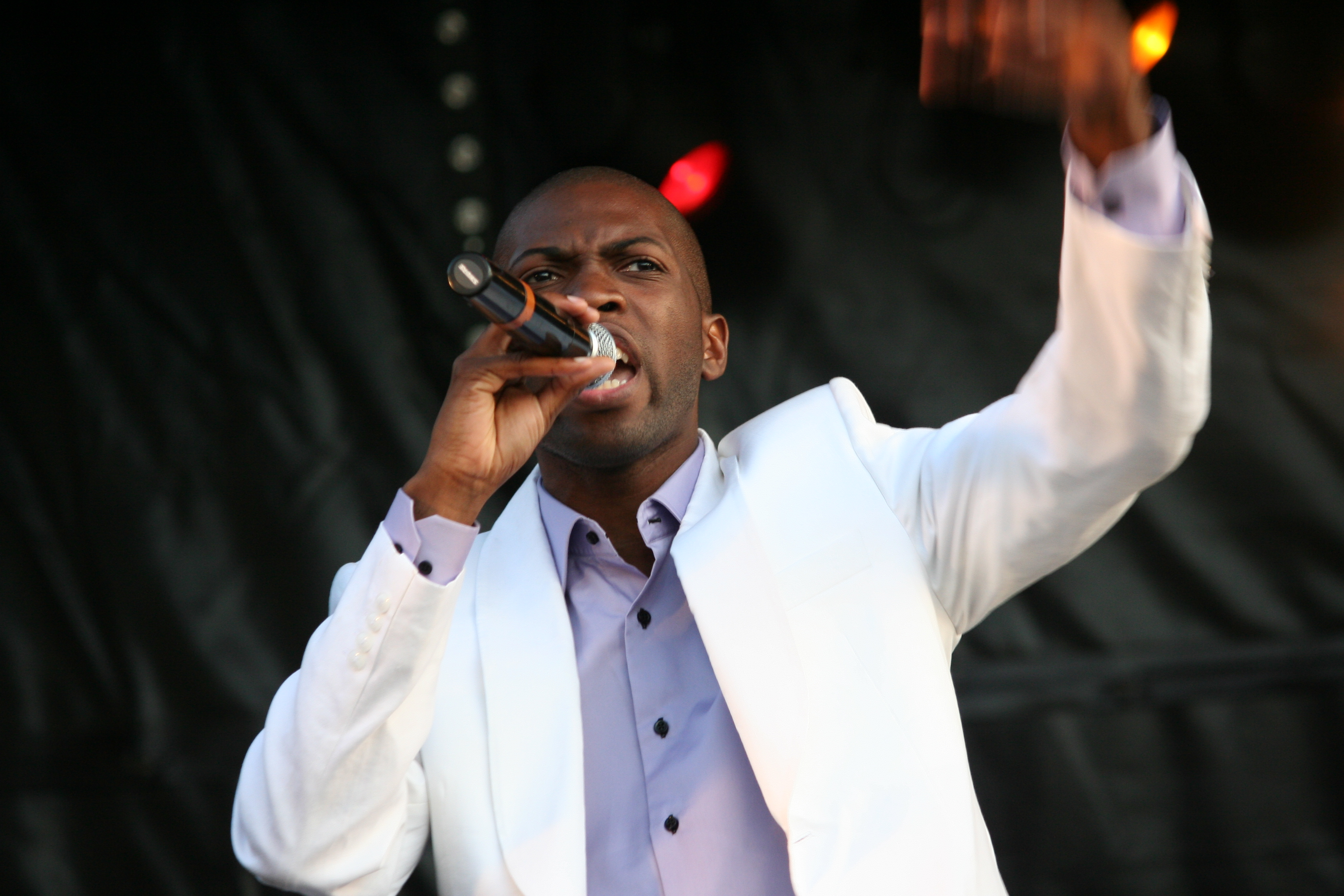
- Yannick performing live in Saint-Lô (June 2009).

Background information
- Born: Yannick M'Bolo; December 19, 1978 (age 47)
- Origin: Paris, France
- Genres: French hip hop, dance-pop, chanson
- Occupation: Vocalist

Yannick M'Bolo (born December 19, 1978, in Paris) is a French hip hop/chanson musician. His parents are from Cameroon. He is best known for his internationally successful song "Ces soirées-là" (English: "Those Nights"), a 2000 dance-based re-imaging of the Four Seasons' hit pop song "December, 1963 (Oh, What a Night)".
