= Ces soirées-là =

2000 song by Yannick

Single by Yannick

from the album C'est ça qu'on aime
- B-side: "Qui ne tente rien n'a rien"
- Released: 25 March 2000
- Genre: Rap, pop
- Length: 3:21
- Label: M13, Sony Music
- Songwriters: Bob Gaudio, DJ Effa; Judy Parker, Yannick
- Producer: DJ Effa

Yannick singles chronology
| "J'aime ta maille" (1998) | "Ces soirées-là" (2000) | "Fais ce qu'il te plait" (2000) |

"Ces soirées-là" (French pronunciation: [se swaʁe la], lit. 'These evenings') is a 2000 song recorded by French singer/rapper Yannick. It was the second single from his debut album C'est ça qu'on aime and was released in March 2000. Based on a Claude François' song “Cette année-là”, it achieved a smash success in France, becoming one of the best-selling singles of all time.

== Background and structure ==
In 1976, the band Four Seasons recorded the hit single "December, 1963 (Oh, What a Night)". The same year, Claude François adapted the song in French-language under the title "Cette année-là" ("That Year"). In 2000, Yannick made a partial cover of François' version: it used almost the same music, but changed the verses. The song, a "dancing and joyful rap", is "festive and lively". According to an analysis of an expert of French charts, the song is characterized by "the brass instruments support[ing] then punctuat[ing] the refrain, the rhythmic tune so characteristic (...) and the bass [playing] in the soloist passage". The lyric "avec bien plus de style que Travolta" pays homage to John Travolta as Tony Manero in Saturday Night Fever.

== Chart performance ==
In France, "Ces soirées-là" debuted at number 13 on 25 March 2000 on the SNEP Singles chart, reached number one three weeks later, staying there for 15 consecutive weeks, and totalled 24 weeks in the top ten, 36 weeks in the top 50 and 37 weeks on the chart (top 100). It was certified Diamond disc by the SNEP. It was also successful in Belgium (Wallonia), where it debuted at number 33 on 6 May 2000, reached number one three weeks and for 10 weeks, and fell off the chart (top 40) after 24 weeks. In both territories, it was the most successful single of the year, ranking at number one on the 2000 year-end chart. In addition, it peaked at number four for two weeks in July 2000 in Switzerland, and remained on the chart for 30 weeks, 14 of them spent in the top ten, and was a top-60 hit in the Netherlands. On the pan-Eurochart Hot 100 Singles chart, it reached number four, a position it held for six consecutive weeks, and remained on the chart for 34 weeks.

== Cover versions ==
The song was covered by The Song Family on the cover album of the same name. Pierre Palmade and Patrick Timsit recorded their own version of the song on Les Enfoirés' album 2002: Tous dans le même bateau, on which it features as second track. It is also the opening number in worldwide smash-hit musical Jersey Boys, which features the life story of Frankie Valli and the Four Seasons.

== Track listings ==
- CD single
1. "Ces soirées-là" (edit radio) – 3:21
2. "Ces soirées-là" (extended version) – 4:43
3. "Qui ne tente rien n'a rien" – 4:45
- Sales in private circuit
1. "Ces soirées-là" (edit radio) – 3:21
2. "Ces soirées-là" (house mix) – 5:08
3. "Ces soirées-là" (instrumental) – 3:21
4. "Ces soirées-là" (a capella) – 3:25

== Charts ==
=== Weekly charts ===
Weekly chart performance for "Ces soirées-là"
| Chart (2000) | Peak position |
|---|---|
| Belgium (Ultratop 50 Wallonia) | 1 |
| Europe (Eurochart Hot 100 Singles) | 4 |
| France (SNEP) | 1 |
| Netherlands (Single Top 100) | 60 |
| Switzerland (Schweizer Hitparade) | 4 |

=== Year-end charts ===
Year-end chart performance for "Ces soirées-là"
| Chart (2000) | Position |
|---|---|
| Belgium (Ultratop 50 Wallonia) | 1 |
| Europe (Eurochart Hot 100 Singles) | 9 |
| France (SNEP) | 1 |
| Switzerland (Schweizer Hitparade) | 14 |

== Certifications and sales ==
"Certifications for "Ces soirées-là"
| Region | Certification | Certified units/sales |
|---|---|---|
| Belgium (BRMA) | 2× Platinum | 100,000^{*} |
| France (SNEP) | Diamond | 750,000^{*} |
| Switzerland (IFPI Switzerland) | Gold | 25,000^{^} |
^{*} Sales figures based on certification alone.^{^} Shipments figures based on certification alone.
