= Indochine discography =

- Studio albums: 14
- Live albums: 12
- Compilation albums: 7
- Singles: 72
- Music videos: 59

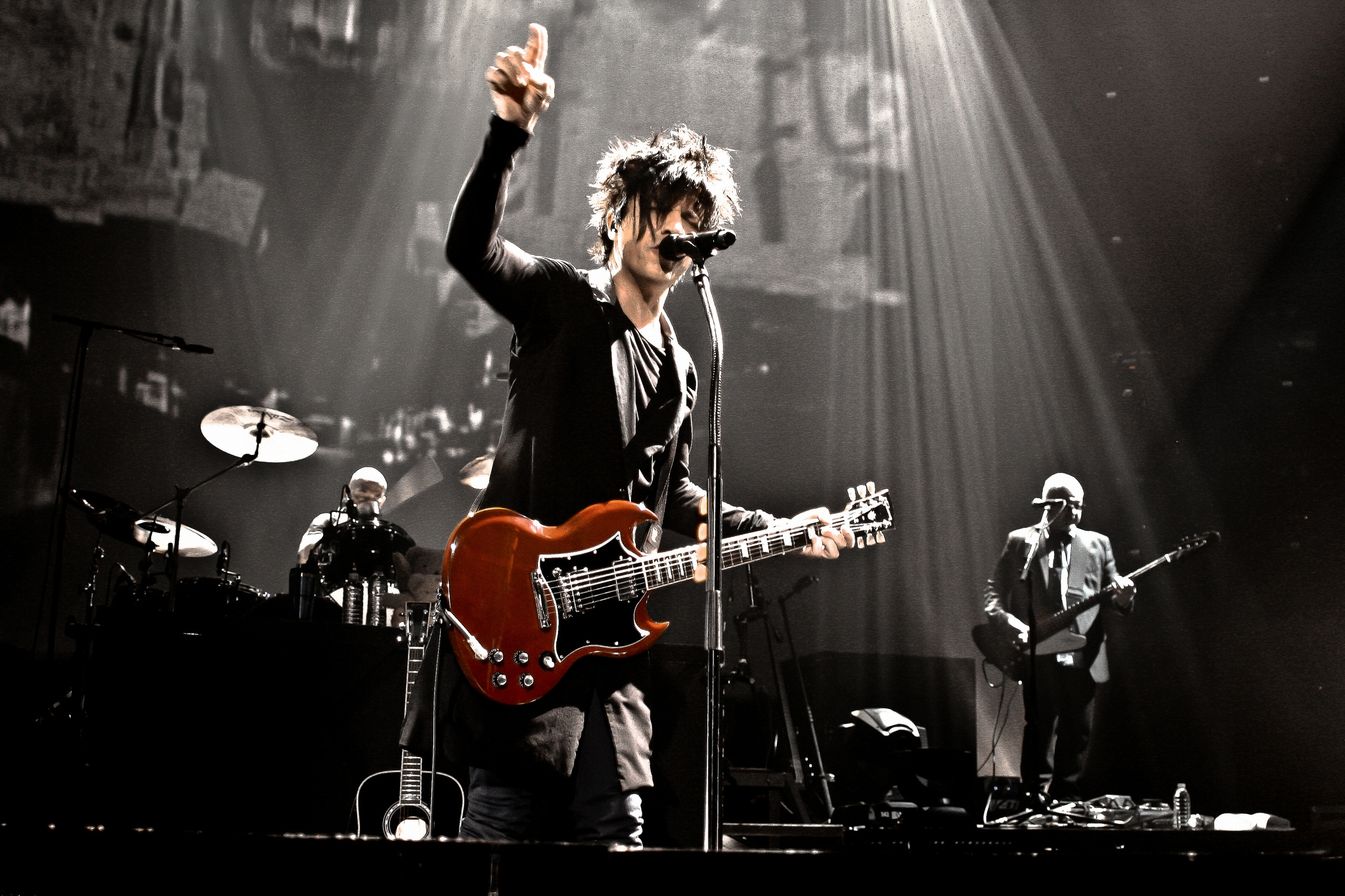
Indochine, Meteor Tour

This is the discography of French rock band Indochine.

== Albums ==
=== Studio albums ===
Title	Album details	Peak chart positions							Certifications
Title	Album details	FRA	BEL (FL)	BEL (WA)	QUE	SWI (ROM)	SWE	SWI	Certifications
L'aventurier	Released: 15 November 1982; Label: Clemence Melody; Formats: LP, MC	7	—	—	—	—	50	—	
Le péril jaune	Released: 28 November 1983; Label: Clemence Melody; Formats: LP, MC	12	—	—	—	—	9	—	
3	Released: 10 May 1985; Label: Ariola; Formats: CD, LP, MC	2	—	—	27	41 (Note: Chart position is from 2020.)	9	—	FRA: Platinum
7000 danses	Released: 12 October 1987; Label: Ariola; Formats: CD, LP, MC	5	—	—	25	—	—	—	FRA: 2× Gold
Le baiser	Released: 5 February 1990; Label: Ariola; Formats: CD, LP, MC	9	—	—	17	—	—	—	FRA: Gold
Un jour dans notre vie	Released: 22 November 1993; Label: BMG Ariola; Formats: CD, MC	—	—	—	25	—	—	—	
Wax	Released: 4 November 1996; Label: BMG; Formats: CD, MC	—	—	26	—	—	—	—	
Dancetaria	Released: 24 August 1999; Label: Double T Music; Formats: CD, 2xLP, MC, MD	14	—	7	—	—	—	—	
Paradize	Released: 14 May 2002; Label: Columbia; Formats: CD, MC	2	—	1	60	—	—	6	BE: Platinum; FRA: Diamond; SWI: Gold
Alice & June	Released: 19 December 2005; Label: Jive/Epic; Formats: CD, 2×CD	1	—	1	17	—	—	17	BE: Gold; FRA: Platinum
La république des meteors	Released: 9 March 2009; Label: Jive/Epic; Formats: CD, 2×LP, digital download	2	31	2	10	—	—	4	BE: Gold; FRA: Platinum; SWI: Gold
Black City Parade	Released: 8 February 2013; Label: Arista/Sony Music; Formats: 2×CD, 2×LP, digital download	1	41	1	15	1	—	3	FRA: 2× Platinum
13	Released: 8 September 2017; Label: Indochine; Formats: 2×CD, 2×LP, digital download	1	42	1	—	1	—	1	BE: Gold; FRA: Diamond
Babel Babel	Released: 7 September 2024; Label: Indochine; Formats: 2×CD, 2×LP, digital download	1	22	1	—	—	—	3	FRA: 3× Platinum
"—" denotes releases that did not chart or were not released in that territory.

==== Remastered reissues ====
Title	Album details	Peak chart positions			
Title	Album details	FRA	BEL (WA)	SWI (ROM)	SWI
Paradize +10	Released: 13 February 2012; Label: Sony Music; Formats: CD, 2×CD+DVD, 4×LP, digital download	3	1	8	41

=== Live albums ===
Title	Album details	Peak chart positions					Certifications
Title	Album details	FRA	BEL (WA)	QUE	SWI (ROM)	SWI	Certifications
Indochine au Zénith	Released: 20 October 1986; Label: Ariola; Formats: CD, LP, MC	7	—	35	—	—	FRA: 2× Gold
Radio Indochine	Released: 24 July 1995; Label: Ariola; Formats: CD, MC	—	44	—	—	—	
Indo Live	Released: 7 November 1997; Label: Une Musique; Formats: 2×CD, MC	12	13	—	—	—	
Nuits intimes	Released: 9 January 2001; Label: Columbia/Sony Music; Formats: CD, MC	22	12	—	—	—	
3.6.3	Released: 5 January 2004; Label: Columbia; Formats: 2×CD	1	1	—	—	41	FRA: Gold
Hanoï	Released: 15 February 2007; Label: Jive/Epic; Formats: CD, 2×CD, digital download	1	1	60	—	7	FRA: Gold
Alice & June Tour	Released: 3 December 2007; Label: Jive/Epic; Formats: 2×CD, digital download	15	12	—	—	39	
Le meteor sur Bruxelles	Released: 21 June 2010; Label: Sony Music; Formats: digital download	—	12	—	—	—	
Putain de stade	Released: 17 January 2011; Label: Jive/Epic; Formats: 2×CD, digital download	2	1	—	1	11	FRA: Gold
Black City Tour	Released: 1 December 2014; Label: Indochine/Sony Music; Formats: 2×CD, digital download	10	8	—	14	66	FRA: Gold
Black City Concerts	Released: 4 December 2015; Label: Indochine/Sony Music; Formats: 2×CD, 4xLP, digital download	25	9	—	28	92	FRA: Gold
Central Tour 2022	Released: 13 January 2023; Label: Indochine/Sony Music; Formats: 3×CD, digital download	1	1	—	—	9	FRA: 2× Platinum
"—" denotes releases that did not chart or were not released in that territory.

=== Compilation albums ===
Title	Album details	Peak chart positions						Certifications
Title	Album details	FRA	BEL (FL)	BEL (WA)	QUE	SWI (ROM)	SWI	Certifications
Indochine	Released: 1988; Label: Ariola; Formats: LP, MC; Peru-only release	—	—	—	—	—	—	
Le Birthday Album	Released: 6 November 1991; Label: BMG Ariola; Formats: CD, MC	3 (Note: Peak position on the Compilations Chart.)	—	49 (Note: Charted position is from 2004.)	19	—	—	FRA: Gold
Unita	Released: 19 February 1996; Label: BMG Ariola; Formats: CD, MC	6	—	16	—	—	—	FRA: Gold
Les versions longues	Released: 19 February 1996; Label: BMG Ariola; Formats: CD; Limited release	—	—	49	—	—	—	
Génération Indochine	Released: 10 April 2000; Label: BMG; Formats: CD, MC	3	—	18	—	—	—	FRA: Gold
Singles Collection 2001–2021	Released: 28 August 2020; Label: Indochine/Sony Music; Formats: 2×CD, 3×CD, 5×LP, 2×MC, digital download	1	52	1	—	1	3	FRA: 2× Platinum
Singles Collection 1981–2001	Released: 11 December 2020; Label: Indochine/Sony Music; Formats: 3×CD, 4×LP, 2×MC, digital download	1	—	1	—	13	9	FRA: 2× Platinum
"—" denotes releases that did not chart or were not released in that territory.

== Singles ==
Title	Year	Peak chart positions					Certifications	Album
Title	Year	FRA	BEL (WA)	SWI (ROM)	SWE	SWI	Certifications	Album
"Dizzidence Politik"	1982	—	—	—	—	—		L'aventurier
"L'aventurier"	1983	5	—	—	—	—		L'aventurier
"Miss Paramount"	1983	13	—	—	—	—		Le péril jaune
"Kao-Bang"	1984	34	—	—	9	—		Le péril jaune
"Canary Bay"	1985	29	—	—	8	—		3
"3e sexe"	1985	3	—	—	—	—	FRA: Gold	3
"Tes yeux noirs"	1986	8	—	—	—	—	FRA: Silver	3
"À l'assaut" (live)	1986	—	—	—	—	—		Indochine au Zénith
"Les Tzars"	1987	17	—	—	—	—		7000 danses
"La machine à rattraper le temps"	1987	—	—	—	—	—		7000 danses
"La chevauchée des champs de blé"	1988	—	—	—	—	—		7000 danses
"Le baiser"	1990	23	—	—	—	—		Le baiser
"Des fleurs pour Salinger"	1990	—	—	—	—	—		Le baiser
"Punishment Park"	1991	—	—	—	—	—		Le baiser
"La guerre est finie..."	1991	—	—	—	—	—		Le Birthday Album
"Savoure le rouge"	1993	—	—	—	—	—		Un jour dans notre vie
"Un jour dans notre vie"	1994	—	—	—	—	—		Un jour dans notre vie
"Sur les toits du monde" (promo-only release)	1994	—	—	—	—	—		Un jour dans notre vie
"3e sexe" (live)	1994	—	—	—	—	—		Radio Indochine
"Des fleurs pour Salinger" (live; promo-only release)	1995	—	—	—	—	—		Radio Indochine
"Kissing My Song"	1996	—	—	—	—	—		Unita
"Drugstar"	1996	—	—	—	—	—		Wax
"Je n' embrasse pas"	1997	—	—	—	—	—		Wax
"Satellite"	1997	—	—	—	—	—		Wax
"L'aventurier" (live; promo-only release)	1998	—	—	—	—	—		Indo Live
"Mes regrets" (live)	1998	—	—	—	—	—		Indo Live
"Juste toi et moi"	1999	86	37	—	—	—		Dancetaria
"Stef II"	1999	—	—	—	—	—		Dancetaria
"Atomic Sky" (Belgium-only release)	2000	—	—	—	—	—		Dancetaria
"Dancetaria"	2000	—	—	—	—	—		Dancetaria
"Justine"	2000	90	— (Note: "Justine" didn't enter the Ultratop Wallonia Top 40, but did peak at number 14 on the Ultratip chart.)	—	—	—		Dancetaria
"Tes yeux noirs" (live; promo-only release)	2001	—	—	—	—	—		Nuits intimes
"Punker"	2002	67	— (Note: "Punker" didn't enter the Ultratop Wallonia Top 40, but did peak at number 15 on the Ultratip chart.)	—	—	—		Paradize
"J'ai demandé à la lune"	2002	1	1	—	—	4	BE: Platinum; FRA: Diamond	Paradize
"Mao Boy"	2002	18	20	—	—	—		Paradize
"Le grand secret" (featuring Melissa Auf der Maur)	2003	9	35	—	—	37	FRA: Gold	Paradize
"Marilyn"	2003	22	25	—	—	71		Paradize
"Un singe en hiver"	2003	19	15	—	—	69		Paradize
"Electrastar" (live; promo-only release)	2003	—	—	—	—	—		3.6.3
"Popstitute" (live; promo-only release)	2004	—	—	—	—	—		3.6.3
"Alice & June"	2005	16	2	—	—	52		Alice & June
"Ladyboy"	2006	19	15	—	—	58		Alice & June
"Adora"	2006	20	34	—	—	70		Alice & June
"Pink Water" (promo-only release)	2006	—	—	—	—	—		Alice & June
"Crash Me"	2007	—	—	—	—	—		Alice & June
"Salômbo" (live; promo-only release)	2007	—	—	—	—	—		Hanoï
"You Spin Me Round" (promo-only release)	2008	—	—	—	—	—		La république des meteors
"Little Dolls"	2008	—	5	—	—	—		La république des meteors
"Play Boy"	2009	—	— (Note: "Play Boy" didn't enter the Ultratop Wallonia Top 40, but did peak at number 18 on the Ultratip chart.)	—	—	—		La république des meteors
"Le lac"	2009	11	— (Note: "Le lac" didn't enter the Ultratop Wallonia Top 40, but did peak at number 15 on the Ultratip chart.)	—	—	—		La république des meteors
"Un ange à ma table"	2010	—	—	—	—	—		La république des meteors
"Le dernier jour" (promo-only release)	2010	—	—	—	—	—		La république des meteors
"Un ange à ma table" (featuring Amwe)	2011	—	—	—	—	—		non-album
"Memoria"	2012	13	6	—	—	—		Black City Parade
"College Boy"	2013	28	— (Note: "College Boy" didn't enter the Ultratop Wallonia Top 50, but did peak at number 2 on the Ultratip chart.)	—	—	—		Black City Parade
"Black City Parade"	2013	31	— (Note: "Black City Parade" didn't enter the Ultratop Wallonia Top 50, but did peak at number 27 on the Ultratip chart.)	—	—	—		Black City Parade
"Belfast"	2014	18	— (Note: "Traffic Girl" didn't enter the Ultratop Wallonia Top 50, but did peak at number 23 on the Ultratip chart.)	—	—	—		Black City Parade
"Traffic Girl"	2014	187	—	—	—	—		Black City Parade
"College Boy" (live)	2014	—	—	—	—	—		Black City Tour
"La vie est belle"	2017	1	6	6	—	73	FRA: Diamond	13
"Un été français"	2018	1	12	—	—	—	FRA: Gold	13
"Station 13"	2018	187	— (Note: "Station 13" didn't enter the Ultratop Wallonia Top 50, but did peak at number 22 on the Ultratip chart.)	—	—	—		13
"Song for a Dream"	2018	—	45	—	—	—	FRA: Gold	13
"Karma Girls"	2019	—	— (Note: "Karma Girls" didn't enter the Ultratop Wallonia Top 50, but did peak at number 24 on the Ultratip chart.)	—	—	—	FRA: Gold	13
"Nos célébrations"	2020	69	12	1	—	—	FRA: Platinum	Singles Collection 2001–2021
"3SEX" (featuring Christine and the Queens)	2020	44	8	—	—	—	FRA: Platinum	Singles Collection 1981–2001
"Le chant des cygnes"	2024	27	15	—	—	—	FRA: Platinum	Babel Babel
"La belle et la bête"	2024	—	—	—	—	—	FRA: Gold	Babel Babel
"L'amour fou"	2025	—	38	—	—	—	FRA: Gold	Babel Babel
"No Name"	2025	—	—	—	—	—		Babel Babel
"Sanna sur la croix"	2025	—	—	—	—	—		Babel Babel
"Les nouveaux soleils"	2026	—	—	—	—	—		Babel Babel
"—" denotes releases that did not chart or were not released in that territory.

== Videos ==
=== Video albums ===
Title	Album details	Peak chart positions		Certifications
Title	Album details	FRA	SWI	Certifications
Indochine au Zénith	Released: 1986; Label: PolyGram Music Video; Formats: VHS	—	—	
Indochine Tour 88	Released: 1988; Label: Proserpine; Formats: VHS	—	—	
Le Birthday Album – Les vidéos	Released: 1991; Label: BMG Video; Formats: VHS	—	—	
Unita	Released: 1996; Label: BMG Video; Formats: VHS	—	—	
Indo Live	Released: 1997; Label: Columbia/Sony Music; Formats: VHS	4	—	FRA: Gold
Paradize	Released: 12 March 2002; Label: Columbia/Sony Music; Formats: DVD; Limited bonus DVD	—	—	
Les divisions de la joie	Released: 16 April 2002; Label: Columbia/Sony Music; Formats: DVD, VHS	16	—	FRA: 2× Platinum
Paradize Show	Released: 5 January 2004; Label: Columbia; Formats: 3xDVD	2	—	FRA: Gold
L'intégrale des clips	Released: 12 December 2004; Label: BMG; Formats: DVD	2	—	FRA: Platinum
Hanoï	Released: 19 February 2007; Label: Jive/Epic; Formats: DVD, 2xDVD	1	—	
Alice & June Tour	Released: 3 December 2007; Label: Jive/Epic; Formats: 2xDVD, 3xDVD	2	—	FRA: 3× Platinum
Putain de stade	Released: 14 January 2011; Label: Jive/Epic; Formats: 2xDVD, 3xDVD, 2xBlu-ray	1	1	
Black City Parade – Le film	Released: 24 June 2013; Label: Sony Music/Arista; Formats: DVD, Blu-ray	—	2	
Black City Tour	Released: 1 December 2014; Label: Sony Music; Formats: 2xDVD, Blu-ray	—	5	
Black City Concerts	Released: 4 December 2015; Label: Indochine; Formats: DVD, Blu-ray	—	10	FRA: 2× Platinum
Central Tour	Released: 13 January 2023; Label: Indochine; Formats: 3xDVD, Blu-ray	1	—	FRA: 3× Platinum
"—" denotes releases that did not chart or were not released in that territory.

=== Music videos ===
Year	Title	Album
1982	"L'aventurier"	L'aventurier
1983	"Miss Paramount"	Le péril jaune
1984	"Kao-Bang"	Le péril jaune
1985	"3e sexe"	3
1985	"Tes yeux noirs"	3
1987	"Les Tzars"	7000 danses
1987	"La Machine à rattraper le temps"	7000 danses
1988	"La Chevauchée des champs de blé"	7000 danses
1988	"La Bûddha Affaire"	7000 danses
1990	"Le baiser"	Le baiser
1990	"Des fleurs pour Salinger"	Le baiser
1990	"More..."	Le baiser
1991	"Punishment Park"	Le baiser
1991	"La guerre est finie"	Le Birthday Album 1981-1991
1993	"Savoure le rouge"	Un jour dans notre vie
1994	"Un jour dans notre vie"	Un jour dans notre vie
1996	"Kissing My Song"	Unita
1996	"Drugstar"	Wax
1997	"Satellite"	Wax
1999	"Juste toi et moi"	Dancetaria
2000	"Stef II"	Dancetaria
2002	"J'ai demandé à la lune"	Paradize
2002	"Mao Boy!"	Paradize
2003	"Le grand secret"	Paradize
2003	"Marilyn"	Paradize
2003	"Un singe en hiver"	Paradize
2005	"Alice & June"	Alice et June
2006	"Crash Me"	Alice et June
2006	"Ladyboy"	Alice et June
2006	"Adora"	Alice et June
2006	"Pink Water"	Alice et June
2008	"You Spin Me Round"	La République des Meteors
2008	"Little Dolls"	La République des Meteors
2009	"Play Boy"	La République des Meteors
2009	"Le lac"	La République des Meteors
2010	"Un ange à ma table"	La République des Meteors
2010	"Le dernier jour"	La République des Meteors
2012	"Memoria"	Black City Parade
2013	"College Boy"	Black City Parade
2013	"Black Ouverture"/"Black City Parade"	Black City Parade
2014	"Belfast"	Black City Parade
2014	"Traffic Girl"	Black City Parade
2015	"College Boy (Spanish Version)"	non-album
2015	"Memoria (Spanish Version)"	non-album
2017	"La vie est belle"	13
2018	"Un été français"	13
2018	"Station 13"	13
2018	"Song for a Dream"	13
2019	"Kimono dans l'ambulance"	13
2019	"Karma Girls"	13
2019	"Gloria"	13
2020	"Nos célébrations"	Singles Collection 2001-2021
2020	"3SEX" (featuring Christine and the Queens)	Singles Collection 1981-2001
2024	"Le chant des cygnes"	Babel Babel
2024	"La belle et la bête"	Babel Babel
2025	"L'amour fou"	Babel Babel
2025	"No Name"	Babel Babel
2025	"Sanna sur la croix"	Babel Babel
2026	"Les nouveaux soleils"	Babel Babel
