= Yellow Peril (disambiguation) =

The Yellow Peril is a racist color metaphor that represents East Asian peoples as an existential danger to the Western world.

Yellow Peril may also refer to:

== Books ==
- Yellow Peril (novel), a 1991 Chinese language novel by Wang Lixiong that was published in English as China Tidal Wave
- The Yellow Peril: Dr Fu Manchu & The Rise of Chinaphobia, a 2014 book by Sir Christopher Frayling
- The Dragon, 1913 novel by M. P. Shiel, serialized as The Yellow Peril in 1929

== Nicknames and slang terms ==
- Handley Page Type D and Handley Page Type E, monoplanes referred to as the Yellow Peril
- N3N Canary, an aircraft
- Stearman N2S, a trainer aircraft
- Vault (sculpture), a sculpture in Melbourne, Australia, popularly known as The Yellow Peril
- Norbert Wiener's book "Extrapolation, Interpolation and Smoothing of Stationary Time Series", nicknamed "the yellow peril" because of the color of the cover and the difficulty of the subject

== Other uses ==
- "The Yellow Peril", an episode of the BBC sit-com Only Fools and Horses
- Yellow Peril, a blog by New Zealand commentator Tze Ming Mok
- Yellow Peril, a webcomic by Jamie Noguchi
- Le Péril jaune, a 1983 album by French band Indochine

== See also ==
- Yellow Pearl (disambiguation)
