= Gang bang (disambiguation) =

A gang bang is a situation where one person has sexual intercourse with usually more than three partners.

Gang bang may also refer to:

== Crime ==
- Gang banging, the act of engaging in violence and other criminal activities as a member of a street gang.

== Music ==
- Gang Bang, 1999 album by René Berg
- Gangbang, cancelled 2016 album by Ayesha Erotica.

=== Songs ===
- "Gang Bang" (song), a 2012 song by Madonna
- "Gang Bang", a 1972 song by Oscar Brown Jr. from Movin' On
- "Gang Bang", a 1974 song by The Sensational Alex Harvey Band from Next
- "Gang Bang", a 1994 song by Brand Nubian on Everything is Everything
- "Gang Bang", a 1996 song by Dr. Dre and World Class Wreckin' Cru
- "Gang Bang", a 2005 song by French band Indochine on Alice & June
- "(Having a) Gangbang", a song by Black Lace featured in the 1987 film Rita, Sue and Bob Too
- "Gang Bang", a 2012 song by Wiz Khalifa
- "Gang Bang", a 2013 song by Bob Seger
- "Gangbang", a 2016 song by Ayesha Erotica

== See also ==
- Bang Gang, an Icelandic band
- Gang banger (disambiguation)
