= Paradize (disambiguation) =

Paradize is a 2002 album recorded by French band Indochine.

Paradize may also refer to:

- "Paradize", a song from the albums Paradize and 3.6.3 by French band Indochine
- "Paradize Bay", a song from Europe by Swedish band Europe
- Paradize Hole, a fictional New York City club in the video game Actua Pool
- "Rainin In Paradize", a song from the album La Radiolina by French musician Manu Chao
- Tony Saunders & Paradize, a band featuring American musician Tony Saunders (bassist)

== See also ==
- Paradise (disambiguation)
