= Danceteria (disambiguation) =

Danceteria was a nightclub in New York City and the Hamptons.

Danceteria may also refer to:

- "Danceteria" (song), a 2026 song by Madonna
- Danceteria (album), a 2026 album by Soft Cell, or the title song

== See also ==
- Dancetaria, a 1999 album and song by Indochine
