= Stéphane Sirkis =

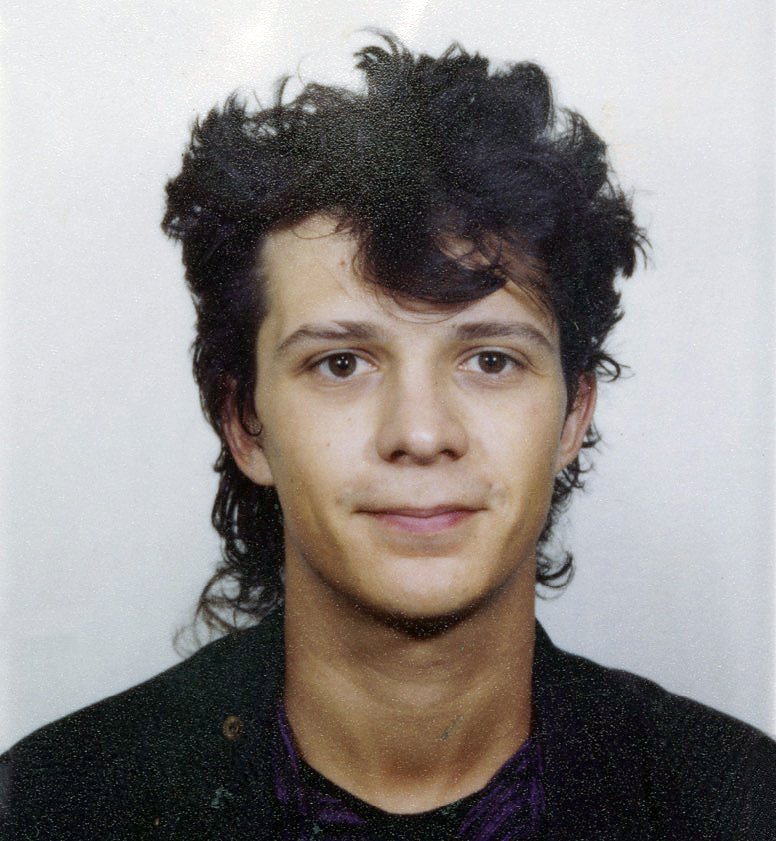
- Stéphane Sirkis in 1984

Background information
- Born: Stéphane Paul Denis Sirchis; June 22, 1959; Antony, Hauts-de-Seine, France
- Died: February 27, 1999 (aged 39) 12th arrondissement of Paris
- Genres: New wave, Alternative rock, pop rock
- Occupations: Singer-Songwriter, Musician
- Instruments: Guitar, Vocals
- Years active: 1981–1999
- Labels: Sony BMG; Jive/Epic
- Formerly of: Indochine
- Website: stephanesirkis.fr

Stéphane Sirkis (June 22, 1959 – February 27, 1999) was a French musician and composer. He was best known as a member of French new-wave band Indochine from 1982 to 1999.

He is the twin brother of singer Nicola Sirkis, the lead singer of the band.

== Death ==
Sirkis died on February 27, 1999, while his brother Nicola Sirkis was recording of a track from the album Dancetaria. According to his brother Stephane Sirkis died of hepatitis C.
