= Le Baiser =

Baiser or Le Baiser may refer to

== Art ==
- Le Baiser (fr), painting by Toulouse-Lautrec
- Le Baiser (Rodin), sculpture

== Books ==
- Le Baiser (fr), short story by Maupassant 1882

== Music ==
- Baiser, Japanese band
- Le Baiser (album), album by Indochine 1990
- "Le Baiser", song by Indochine from Le Baiser 1990
