= Indo Live =

INDO LIVE

Live album by Indochine
- Released: 1997
- Genre: New wave

Indochine chronology
| Wax (1996) | INDO LIVE (1997) | Dancetaria (1999) |

INDO LIVE is the third live album by French new wave band Indochine. It was released in 1997.

== Track listing ==
=== Disc One ===
| No. | Title | Length |
|---|---|---|
| 1. | "Ouverture" | 1:49 |
| 2. | "Mire-Live" | 4:58 |
| 3. | "Unisexe" | 5:31 |
| 4. | "Les tzars" | 4:53 |
| 5. | "3 nuits par semaine" | 7:10 |
| 6. | "La main sur vous" | 4:51 |
| 7. | "Les silences de Juliette" | 5:43 |
| 8. | "Kissing My Song" | 4:25 |
| 9. | "Satellite" | 5:26 |
| 10. | "Punishment Park" | 4:06 |
| 11. | "Echo-Ruby" | 4:03 |
| 12. | "Je n'embrasse pas" | 6:05 |
| 13. | "Drugstar" | 5:26 |

=== Disc Two ===
| No. | Title | Length |
|---|---|---|
| 1. | "Révolution" | 5:35 |
| 2. | "Des fleurs pour Salinger" | 6:24 |
| 3. | "Canary Bay" | 6:13 |
| 4. | "Monte Cristo" | 4:56 |
| 5. | "Mes regrets - 3e sexe" | 6:37 |
| 6. | "Tes yeux noirs" | 5:23 |
| 7. | "L'aventurier" | 7:04 |
