= J'ai demandé à la lune =

2002 single by Indochine

Single by Indochine

from the album Paradize
- Language: French
- English title: "I Asked the Moon"
- B-side: "Punker", "Glory Hole"
- Released: March 2002
- Length: 3:29
- Label: Columbia
- Songwriter: Mickaël Furnon
- Producers: Oli de Sat, Phil Delire, Indochine

Indochine singles chronology
"Punker" (2002)	"J'ai demandé à la lune" (2002)	"Mao Boy" (2002)

Music video
- "J'ai demandé à la lune" on YouTube

"J'ai demandé à la lune" (English: "I Asked the Moon") is a song by the French new wave band Indochine, from their 2002 album Paradize. Written by Mickaël Furnon, the singer of Mickey 3D, the song was released as the second single from the album in March 2002 and quickly became a national success, topping the French Singles Chart and selling over 750,000 units in France alone.

== Background and music video ==
During the recording of the album, Indochine's singer Nicola Sirkis asked Pauline, the eight-year-old daughter of his friend Rudy Léonet, to perform the background vocals. The music video shows Sirkis walking towards the camera with a baby, then a young child in his arms, and finally Pauline appears alongside him and sings a duet with Sirkis.

== Chart performance ==
The song debuted on the French SNEP Singles Chart at number 14 on 13 April 2002 and reached number one for one week on 20 July. The single remained in the top 10 for 20 weeks, in the top 50 for 27 weeks, and on the chart for 31 weeks. It achieved diamond status on 6 November 2002 and was the fifth best-selling single of the year. As of August 2014, the song was the 25th-best-selling single of the 21st century in France.

In Wallonia, the single charted for 36 weeks. It entered the top 10 during its 12th week on the Ultratop chart and stayed there for 17 consecutive weeks, peaking at number one for five weeks. The single was ranked fifth on Wallonia's 2002 year-end chart. In Switzerland, "J'ai demandé à la lune" debuted at its peak of number four on 21 July 2002 and became the 39th-best-selling hit of the year.

== Track listing ==
- CD single
1. "J'ai demandé à la lune" – 3:29
2. "Punker" – 2:50
3. "Glory Hole" – 3:27

== Charts ==
=== Weekly charts ===
Weekly chart performance for "J'ai demandé à la lune"
Chart (2002)	Peak position
Belgian (Wallonia) Singles Chart	1
French Singles Chart	1
Swiss Singles Chart	4

=== Year-end charts ===
Year-end chart performance for "J'ai demandé à la lune"
Chart (2002)	Position
Belgian (Wallonia) Singles Chart	5
Europe (Eurochart Hot 100)	22
French Airplay Chart	5
French TV Music Videos Chart	17
French Singles Chart	5
Swiss Singles Chart	39

== Certifications ==
Certifications for "J'ai demandé à la lune"
Country	Certification	Date	Sales certified
Belgium	Platinum	21 September 2002	40,000
France	Diamond	6 November 2002	750,000

== Cover versions ==
The song is also covered by Vox Angeli, a choir composed of children, and features as the first track on the 2008 album of the same name.

In 2011, the single was partly re-written by Mickaël Furnon under the title "On demande pas la lune" for the annual Les Enfoirés charity concert. This version peaked at number 30 on the French Singles Chart, and at number nine on the Belgian (Wallonia) Ultratop 40.

In 2021, Québecois singer-songwriter Ghostly Kisses (real name Margaux Sauvé) released her version of the song in partnership with composer pianist Louis-Étienne Santais.
