= Hanoï (album) =

Live album by Indochine
- Released: February 2007
- Recorded: 6 June 2006
- Genre: New wave
- Length: 59:01

Indochine chronology
Alice & June (2005)	Hanoï (2007)	La République des Meteors (2009)

Professional ratings
Review scores
Source	Rating
AllMusic	3.5/5 stars

Hanoï is the sixth live album by French new wave band Indochine. It was released in February 2007. It is a recording of a performance that took place on 6 June 2006. The album takes its name from the location of the concert, Hanoi, Vietnam.

== Track listing ==
=== Disc 1 - Hanoï Classique ===
No.	Title	Length
1.	"Le Péril Jaune"	3:30
2.	"Ceremonia"	4:39
3.	"Salômbo"	3:51
4.	"Justine"	4:24
5.	"Trois Nuits Par Semaine"	6:23
6.	"Sweet Dreams"	6:03
7.	"Pink Water"	5:53
8.	"J'Ai Demandé A La Lune"	4:21
9.	"Tes Yeux Noirs"	5:05
10.	"L'Aventurier"	6:33
11.	"Talulla"	4:21

=== Disc 2 - Hanoï Rock ===
No.	Title	Length
1.	"Les Portes Du Soir"	5:04
2.	"Alice & June"	4:57
3.	"Marilyn"	5:12
4.	"Adora"	4:32
5.	"Atomic Sky"	5:04
6.	"Gang Bang"	4:05
7.	"Lady Boy"	4:21
8.	"Starlight"	5:10
