= Yellow Pearl =

Yellow Pearl may refer to:

- Yellow Pearl (album), a compilation album by Phil Lynott
- "Yellow Pearl" (song), a song by Phil Lynott from Solo in Soho
- Yellow Pearl (band), a 1970s folk music group with Chris Iijima and Nobuko JoAnne Miyamoto
- Yellow Pearl, a Dutch band produced by Stephen van Haestregt

== See also ==
- Yellow Peril (disambiguation)
