= 13 (Indochine album) =

Studio album by Indochine
- Released: 8 September 2017
- Recorded: 2016–2017
- Genre: Rock, new wave, synth-pop
- Length: 1:16:57
- Label: Indochine / Smart

Indochine chronology
Black City Parade (2013)	13 (2017)	Babel Babel (2024)

Singles from 13
- 1. "La vie est belle" Released: 9 June 2017; 2. "Un été français" Released: 5 January 2018; 3. "Station 13" Released: 15 June 2018; 4. "Song for a Dream" Released: 13 September 2018; 5. "Karma Girls" Released: 13 March 2019

13 is the 13th studio album by the French band Indochine, mixed by Mick Guzauski and released on 8 September 2017. The album topped the French, Swiss and Belgian French (Wallonia) charts.

The band promoted the album with the 13 Tour.

== Track listing ==
No.	Title	Length
1.	"Black Sky"	6:26
2.	"2033"	4:06
3.	"Station 13"	6:18
4.	"Henry Darger"	5:28
5.	"La vie est belle"	5:27
6.	"Kimono dans l'ambulance"	5:51
7.	"Karma Girls"	6:32
8.	"Suffragettes BB"	5:56
9.	"Un été français"	5:26
10.	"TomBoy 1" (feat. Kiddy Smile)	6:14
11.	"Song for a Dream"	5:33
12.	"Cartagène"	6:32
13.	"Gloria" (feat. Asia Argento)	7:08

=== Bonus tracks on deluxe edition ===
No.	Title	Length
1.	"Trump le monde "	6:09
2.	"La 13ème vague"	4:59
3.	"Station 13" (Long version)	8:06
4.	"Tomboy 2"	6:01
5.	"Henry Darger" (John Digweed & Nick Muir Remix)	5:23
6.	"Un été français" (Joachim Garraud Remix)	5:09
7.	"Station 13" (Vitalic Remix)	6:12
8.	"Station 13" (Talisco Remix)	4:43

== Musicians ==
- Nicola Sirkis : Vocals, piano, guitar, Bass, Synthesizers
- Oli De Sat : Piano, guitar, Bass, synth, backing vocals
- Boris: Guitar
- Marc : Bass
- Ludwig : Drums

== Charts ==
=== Weekly charts ===
Chart (2017–2018)	Peak position
Belgian Albums (Ultratop Flanders)	42
Belgian Albums (Ultratop Wallonia)	1
French Albums (SNEP)	1
Swiss Albums (Schweizer Hitparade)	1

=== Year-end charts ===
Chart (2017)	Position
Belgian Albums (Ultratop Wallonia)	2
French Albums (SNEP)	19
Swiss Albums (Schweizer Hitparade)	70

Chart (2018)	Position
Belgian Albums (Ultratop Wallonia)	17
French Albums (SNEP)	17

Chart (2019)	Position
Belgian Albums (Ultratop Wallonia)	83

== Certifications ==
Region	Certification	Certified units/sales
Belgium (BEA)	Gold	10,000^{‡}
France (SNEP)	Diamond	500,000^{‡}
^{‡} Sales+streaming figures based on certification alone.
