= Radio Indochine =

Live album by Indochine
- Released: July 24, 1995
- Recorded: July 31, 1994
- Genre: New wave
- Length: 72:32

Indochine chronology
Un jour dans notre vie (1993)	Radio Indochine (1995)	Wax (1996)

Radio Indochine is the second live album by French new wave band, Indochine, and eighth album overall. It was released on July 24, 1995.

== Track listing ==
1. Savoure le rouge - 5:26
2. 3 nuits par semaine - 6:05
3. Canary Bay - 5:56
4. Un jour dans notre vie - 6:22
5. Tes yeux noirs - 4:53
6. 3e sexe - 3:46
7. More - 5:51
8. La machine à rattraper le temps - 3:47
9. Des fleurs pour Salinger - 7:37
10. Kao Bang - 3:59
11. Bienvenue chez les nus - 4:13
12. Les tzars - 5:12
13. Crystal Song Telegram - 2:38
14. L'aventurier - 6:53
