= Amwe =

Japanese singer (born 1984)

AMWE
- Born: June 6, 1984 (age 42)
- Origin: Nagoya, Japan
- Genres: New Wave, electronica, dance
- Occupations: Singer, songwriter, composer, producer, graphic designer
- Instruments: Vocals, keyboard
- Years active: 2008–present
- Labels: Pure Groove, Third-Ear, UMAA

AMWE (/ʌmui/) is an indie New Wave and electronica artist from Nagoya, Japan.

AMWE began her career performing in jazz cover bands and 1980s-style music groups. She made her debut in October 2009 under Pure Groove Records. As a multifaceted artist, AMWE is responsible for producing, writing, and providing vocals for all of her music.

AMWE gained recognition when she won the Japanese leg of the Diesel U Music competition in 2008. Inspired by her experiences experimenting with music production on her computer and a performance with Swedish artist Juvelen, she shifted her focus towards a solo career. Her increasing exposure led to an invitation from the French electronic music label Kitsuné to remix a song, which subsequently featured her track "Friction Between the Lovers" on their compilation album, Kitsuné Maison 8.

AMWE has drawn comparisons to artists such as pop artist Robyn, French duo Daft Punk, and Japanese electro singer Immi.

She was selected as one of the 10 best new artists in 2010, in "iTunes Japan Sound of 2010", for which iTunes selects the most prospective young artists, based on voting by music-related people. Her second album contains a total of 12 songs and a DVD, including a cover of "Girls and Boys", a hit song by Blur in 1994; a cover of "Groove Is in the Heart", a hit by Deee-Lite; a cover of "Only Shallow", by My Bloody Valentine; "Moon Light", a standard number at AMWE's live performances, a girl's anthem called "Girl's Night Out", and more.

In 2011, she released a Japanese cover version of the song Un ange à ma table from French pop rock and new wave band Indochine. The recording revenues were sent to the Japanese Red Cross as a relief from the earthquake and tsunami disaster.

== Discography ==
=== Studio albums ===
- I am AMWE (November 30, 2009)
- Girls (September 29, 2010)

=== Mini-albums ===
- Bangin' The Drum EP (September 15, 2009)
