= L'Aventurier (song) =

1982 single by Indochine

Single by Indochine

from the album L'Aventurier
- Released: 1982
- Recorded: 1982
- Genre: New wave, pop rock
- Length: 3:43
- Label: BMG Ariola
- Songwriter: Dominique Nicolas
- Producer: Indochine

Indochine singles chronology
"L'Aventurier" (1982)	"Dizzidence Politik" (1982)

"L'Aventurier" (pronounced [lavɑ̃tyʁje]) is a song by French pop-rock band Indochine, from the album of the same name, released in 1982. It reached No 4 in the French music chart.

== Conception ==
L'Aventurier evokes the world of Bob Morane, mentioning characters (Bill Ballantine, Miss Ylang-Ylang) and titles from his novels. In an interview with Figaro, Nicola Sirkis recounted how he found the theme for this song, which he wrote in four hours.

"At the time, we were in the middle of the trip Rambo, the invincible heroes ... I went to search the library that I had brought back from Belgium, I found Bob Morane with incredible titles, which matched the music very well. So I stole all the titles of all the books that Henri Vernes had written, I moved them, relocated, to recompose a story."

The lyrics of the song relate to several titles of Bob Morane novels: La Vallée infernale (In the lyric "Égaré dans la vallée infernale"), "L'Ombre jaune" (In "A la recherche de l'Ombre Jaune") "La marque de Kali" (In "Le bandit s'appelle Mister Kali Jones"), "Trafic aux Caraïbes" (In "Stop au trafic des Caraïbes "), et cetera. Some terms, on the other hand, fall under the pure imagination of Nicola Sirkis, such as "Opération Nadawieb" (In "Escale dans l'opération Nadawieb"). Some of the novels mentioned by Henri Vernes belonged to the library he had built up when he lived in Uccle, in Belgium, until he was 15 years old.

== Genesis ==
According to the manuscript published in the book Kissing my songs (Flammarion, 2011), L'Aventurier was written by Nicola Sirkis in December 1981. Nicola Sirkis had discovered Bob Morane, a hero created by the Belgian novelist Henri Vernes for the pocket collection "Marabout Junior, when he was in boarding school in Belgium.

The song, along with several others from the album L'Aventurier, was recorded at the Aguessau studio, in Paris, in September 1982, during a session that was to be devoted solely to their first single, "Dizzidence Politik". "L'Aventurier" was decisive in the choice of their producer of the time, Didier Guinochet, to finance their first album. The B-side contains another song from the same album: "Indochine (Les 7 jours de Pékin)". The cover design was made by graphic-designer Marion Bataille, and the photo by J.F. Rousseau stylistically represents the four members of the group, with an Asian-inspired typography.

== Reception ==
On Antenna 2, the broadcast Platine 45, devoted to music videos, broadcasts that of L'Aventurier February 16, 1983, before a special show devoted to the group Indochina on March 11, 1983,

Musically, Sud Ouest judged that this piece is distinguished by its "ultra dancing, bouncy and playful pop rock."

Journalist Rebecca Manzoni notes that L'Aventurier "Introduces in the introduction a ritornello inspired by Asia, supported by futuristic sounds (...), followed by a guitar riff composed by Dominique Nicolas, a riff so effective that it allows to identify the song."

In 2017, Le Point felt that the song remains "the best known of the band."

"Since 1982, this song continues to resonate on the dance floors of discotheques or parties with friends, when it is the turn of the tubes of the eighties," notes his site "Ouest France".

When she mixed as a DJ in parties, the Italian actress Asia Argento tells that she was playing this song.
