= 3 (Indochine album) =

Studio album by Indochine
- Released: 10 May 1985
- Recorded: January–February 1985
- Studio: Ferber (Paris); Red Bus (London)
- Genre: Post-punk; new wave
- Length: 40:18
- Label: Ariola
- Producer: Philippe Eidel; Indochine

Indochine chronology
Le Péril Jaune (1983)	3 (1985)	Indochine Au Zénith (1986)

3 is the third studio album by French new wave band Indochine. It was released in 1985 in France, Germany, Canada, Japan and Sweden.

"3eme Sexe" was the inspiration for Mylène Farmer's song "Sans contrefaçon". Miss Kittin covered "3ème Sexe" for her album I Com and was reworked by Christine and the Queens as "3SEX" with Indochine in 2020.

== Track listing ==
No.	Title	Length
1.	"3eme Sexe"	5:01
2.	"Canary Bay"	5:23
3.	"Monte Cristo"	4:32
4.	"Salômbo"	5:09
5.	"Hors-La-Loi"	3:09
6.	"A L'Assaut (Des Ombres Sur L'O)"	3:49
7.	"3 Nuits Par Semaine"	5:14
8.	"Le Train Sauvage"	3:18
9.	"Tes Yeux Noirs"	4:51
