= L'Aventurier =

Studio album by Indochine
- Released: 15 November 1982
- Recorded: September 1982
- Studio: Studio d'Aguesseau
- Genre: New wave, synthpop
- Label: Clemence Melody
- Producer: Indochine, Patrick Le Morvan

Indochine chronology
L'Aventurier (1982)	Le Péril Jaune (1983)

L'Aventurier (pronounced [lavɑ̃tyʁje]; The Adventurer) is the debut studio album of Indochine, a French pop rock band, released in 1982. The title track was a huge success during the same year, becoming one of the band's classic songs.

== Recognition and award ==
It won the "Song of the Summer" of 1982 in France, while the disc itself also won the "Bus D'Acier" award for 1983. The song references the universe of Bob Morane.

== Track listing ==
1. L'Aventurier - 3.53
2. L'Opportuniste - 2.26
3. Leila - 3.56
4. Docteur Love - 2.32
5. Indochine (Les 7 Jours De Pékin) - 2.24
6. Dizzidence Politik - 4.21
7. Françoise (Qu'est-ce qui t'as pris?) - 2.36
