= La République des Meteors =

Studio album by Indochine
- Released: 9 March 2009
- Genres: Rock, new wave
- Label: Jive/Epic - Sony
- Producer: Oli de Sat

Indochine chronology
Hanoï (2007)	La République des Meteors (2009)	Black City Parade (2013)

Singles from La République des Meteors
- 1. "You Spin Me Round (Like A Record) (Stand-alone single, only included in the special edition of the album)" Released: 2008; 2. "Little Dolls (First official single)" Released: 2008; 3. "Play Boy" Released: 2009; 4. "Le lac" Released: 2009; 5. "Un ange à ma table" Released: 2010; 6. "Le dernier jour" Released: 2010

Professional ratings
Review scores
Source	Rating
AllMusic	3.5/5 stars

La République des Meteors (The Republic of Meteors) is the eleventh studio album by French band Indochine. It was released on 9 March 2009, in France. It peaked at #2 on the French Albums Chart and was certified Platinum in France.

The single "Le lac" charted at 11 in France, 5 in Belgium and 31 in Switzerland.

== Track listing ==
No.	Title	Length
1.	"Republika meteor ouverture"
2.	"Go Rimbaud, Go!"
3.	"Junior Song"
4.	"Little Dolls"
5.	"Le grand soir"
6.	"Un ange à ma table"
7.	"La lettre de métal"
8.	"Le lac"
9.	"Republika"
10.	"Play Boy"
11.	"L World"
12.	"Je t'aime tant" (Elli et Jacno cover)
13.	"Bye Bye Valentine"
14.	"Les aubes sont mortes"
15.	"Union War"
16.	"Le dernier jour / Tom & Jerry" (Hidden track)

A limited edition of the album was released with a second disc.

No.	Title	Length
1.	"We Are The Young"
2.	"Mexicane Syndicate"
3.	"You Spin Me Round (Like a Record)" (Dead or Alive cover)
4.	"Junior Song" (A Cappella)
5.	"Play Boy" (A Cappella)
6.	"You Spin Me Round (Like a Record)" (Music video)

== Charts ==
=== Weekly charts ===
Chart (2009)	Peak position
Belgian Albums (Ultratop Flanders)	31
Belgian Albums (Ultratop Wallonia)	2
French Albums (SNEP)	2
Swiss Albums (Schweizer Hitparade)	4

=== Year-end charts ===
Chart (2009)	Position
Belgian Albums (Ultratop Wallonia)	4
French Albums (SNEP)	13

Chart (2010)	Position
French Albums (SNEP)	92
