= The Yellow Peril: Dr Fu Manchu & The Rise of Chinaphobia =

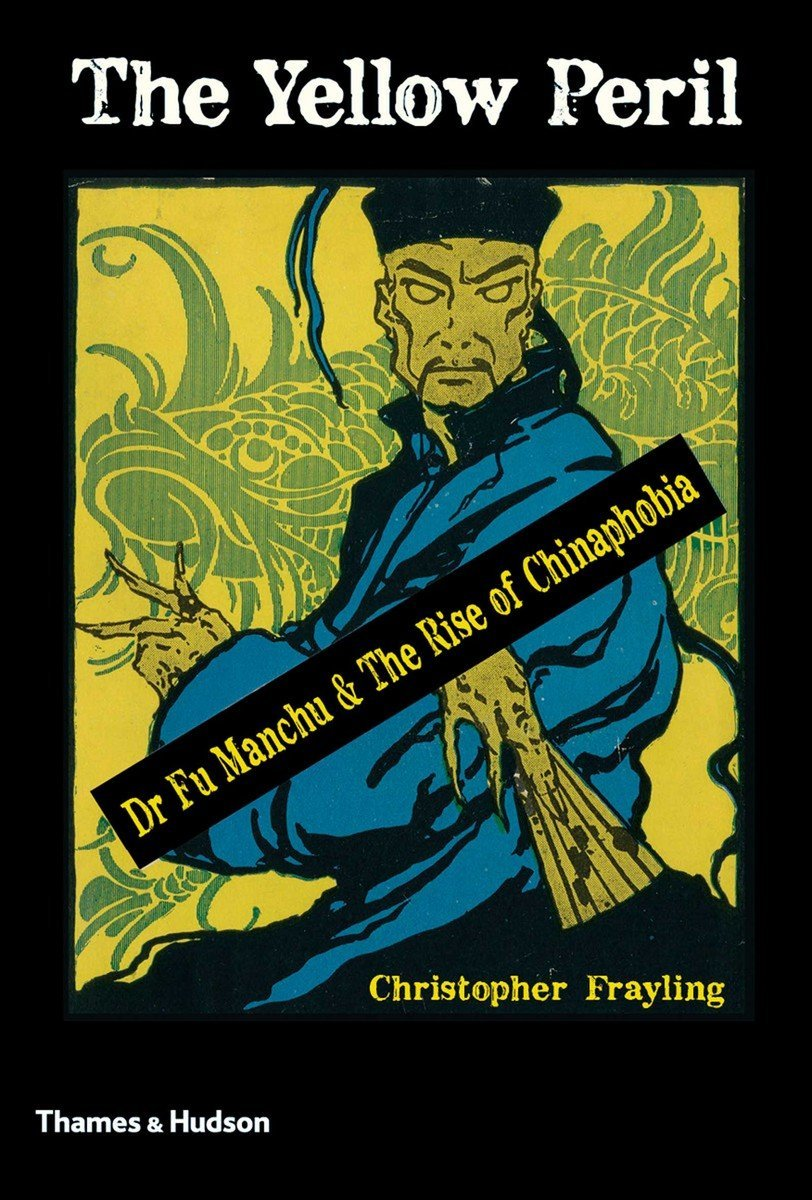
- Author: Sir Christopher Frayling
- Subject: Sinophobia
- Genre: Non-fiction
- Publisher: Thames & Hudson
- Publication date: 2014
- Pages: 360
- ISBN: 978-0500252079
- OCLC: 0500252076

The Yellow Peril: Dr Fu Manchu & The Rise of Chinaphobia is a 2014 non-fiction book by the British educationalist and writer, Sir Christopher Frayling.

The book examines Western world’s attitude towards Chinese people over several hundred years. It draws on a broad range of cultural references including fiction, film, theatre, music, television, comics and poetry; to describe the evolution of Sinophobia in the West and argues for its ongoing resilience today.

== Notable reviews ==
- Review by Julia Lovell in The Guardian, October 30, 2014
- Review in the Financial Times, October 17, 2014
- Review by Yo Zushi in the New Statesman, December 4, 2014
- Review in The Irish Times, November 4, 2014
