= Black City Parade =

Studio album by Indochine
- Released: 8 February 2013
- Genre: Rock, new wave
- Length: 72:25
- Label: Arista France

Indochine chronology
La République des Meteors (2009)	Black City Parade (2013)	13 (2017)

Singles from Black City Parade
- 1. "Memoria" Released: 15 November 2012; 2. "College Boy" Released: 13 May 2013; 3. "Black City Parade" Released: 4 November 2013; 4. "Belfast" Released: 3 March 2014

Black City Parade is the twelfth studio album by French band Indochine. It was released on 8 February 2013 in France, peaking at number one on both the French and Belgian Albums Charts, as well as being certified Platinum in France. The album was supported by the multi-leg Black City Tour.

== Production ==
Most of the album was mixed by Shane Stoneback.

== Promotion ==
The song "Kill Nico" was premiered during the "Paradize + 10" concerts that took place before the release of the album.

The first single released from the album was "Memoria", on 15 November 2012. The second single from the album was "College Boy", released on 13 May 2013. The video attracted attention due to its graphic violence pointing at homophobia. The third single from the album is "Black City Parade".

The album was also accompanied by an almost two-hour documentary, as the band let a film crew film the process of creating the album, from demoing, rewriting, recording and mixing to planning the tour.

== Track listing ==
No.	Title	Length
1.	"Black Ouverture"	0:51
2.	"Black City Parade"	5:34
3.	"College Boy"	4:47
4.	"Memoria"	7:14
5.	"Le fond de l'air est rouge"	4:54
6.	"Wuppertal"	6:48
7.	"Le Messie"	5:08
8.	"Belfast"	6:05
9.	"Traffic Girl"	5:20
10.	"Thea Sonata"	5:20
11.	"Anyway"	4:04
12.	"Nous demain"	5:56
13.	"Kill Nico"	5:53
14.	"Eurpoane ou le Dernier Bal"	4:34

=== Bonus tracks on limited edition ===
No.	Title	Length
1.	"Salomé "	6:28
2.	"The Lovers"	4:47
3.	"Trashmen"	3:53

== Charts ==
=== Weekly charts ===
Chart (2013)	Peak position
Belgian Albums (Ultratop Flanders)	40
Belgian Albums (Ultratop Wallonia)	1
French Albums (SNEP)	1
Swiss Albums (Romandie)	1
Swiss Albums (Schweizer Hitparade)	3

=== Year-end charts ===
Chart (2013)	Position
Belgian Albums (Ultratop Wallonia)	7
French Albums (SNEP)	18
Chart (2014)	Position
Belgian Albums (Ultratop Wallonia)	113
French Albums (SNEP)	121
