= Nicola Sirkis =

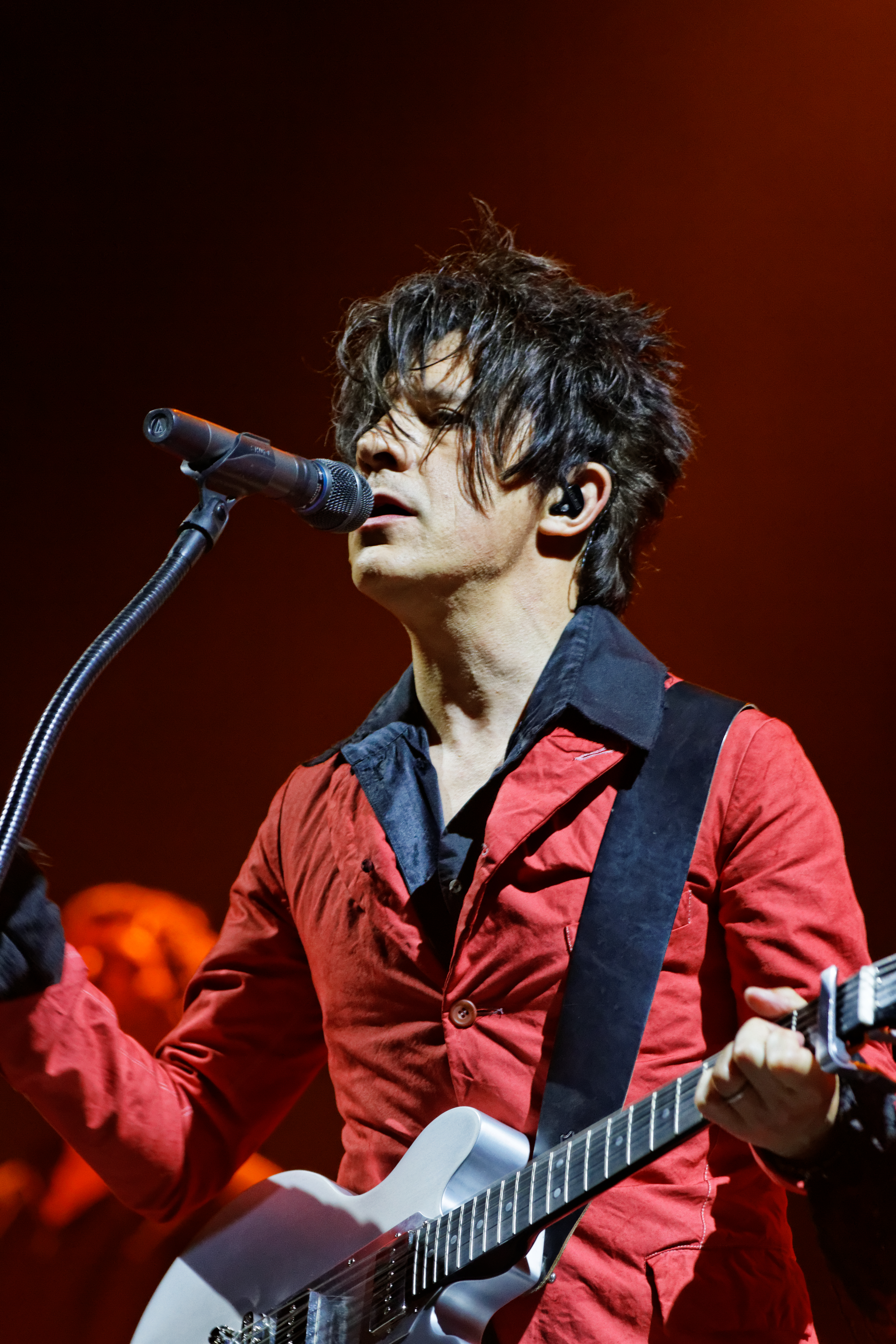
- Sirkis at the 2014 Vieilles Charrues Festival

Background information
- Born: Nicolas Henri Didier Sirchis; 22 June 1959 (age 67)
- Origin: Antony, Paris Region, France
- Genres: New wave, Alternative rock, pop rock
- Occupations: Singer-Songwriter, Musician
- Instruments: Vocals, Guitar
- Years active: 1981–present
- Labels: Sony BMG; Jive/Epic
- Member of: Indochine
- Website: indo.fr

Nicolas Henri Didier Sirchis (French pronunciation: [nikɔla ɑ̃ʁi didje siʁkis]; born 22 June 1959), better known by his stage name Nicola Sirkis, is a French musician, primarily known for his work as the frontman and singer of the French rock band Indochine. He is the only remaining member of the original line-up of the band which he formed in 1981 with a friend, Dominique Nicolas, soon to be joined by his twin brother Stéphane and Dimitri Bodianski.

The band has been active for 45 years, and Nicola Sirkis saw critical and wide appeal and success in 2002 with the release of Paradize. The group received further critical acclaim with their album 13. Upon its release in 2017, the album topped the charts in France, Belgium and Switzerland, and they are hailed as the top rock group in France.

In 1992, Nicola Sirkis released a solo-album, Dans la Lune, covering a few of his favourite songs, in French or English.

Nicola Sirkis is also the author of the collection of short stories "Les Mauvaises Nouvelles", published in 1998. And "Les petites notes du Meteor Tour".

In 2023, Sirkis was a guest celebrity judge in the episode of the Season 2 titled A Lé-Gen-Daire Return of the French language reality television series Drag Race France broadcast on France.tv Slash.

== Personal life ==
Nicola Sirkis has two brothers, his fraternal twin Stéphane (22 June 1959 – 27 February 1999) and elder brother Christophe (born 6 April 1957). Stéphane joined Indochine in 1982, playing synthesizers and guitar, and remained with the band until his death from hepatitis C after years of struggling with drug addiction. Their elder brother wrote Starmustang, published in 2009, recounting his point of view and blaming Nicola for Stéphane's death. Nicola does have a close relationship with Stéphane's daughter Lou (born 8 August 1990) who has founded her own band Toybloïd. She sometimes joins Indochine on stage, most recently with her cousin Théa to celebrate Nicola's 60th birthday on 22 June 2019.

Nicola married twice in the 1990s, first to graphic designer Marion Bataille who designed Indochine's album covers from 1982 to 1989 and second, in 1995, to actress Marie Guillard. They divorced in 1998.

In 1996 he met Gwenaëlle Bouchet (known as Gwen Blast), the bassist for the band Madinkà. They married in 2003 and eventually separated and divorced in 2009. They have a daughter, Théa (born 25 October 2001). His daughter is the inspiration for several of Indochine's songs: Bye Bye Valentine, Memoria, 2033 and Mao Boy. Written before Théa's birth, Mao Boy is a song celebrating the impending joys and fears of becoming a parent. The last stanza begins with, "You are my life, the rest of my life, so be it. You taught me how to save my life" referring to his grief after his brother's death, and now finding joy in the birth of this new life.

Nicola also has two sons, Alice-Tom (born October 2008) and, with his latest girlfriend, Jules (born January 2016).

== Discography ==
(For discography with Indochine, refer to discography section on that page)

=== Singles ===
Year	Album	Peak positions	Certification
Year	Album	SWE	Certification
2014	"Hexagone"	198	La Bande à Renaud
