= Le Baiser (album) =

Le baiser

Studio album by Indochine
- Released: February 5, 1990
- Recorded: August 1989
- Studio: Studio Plus XXX, Sun Studios
- Genre: New wave
- Length: 44:44
- Label: Ariola
- Producer: Indochine and Philippe Eidel

Indochine chronology
7000 danses (1987)	Le baiser (1990)	Un jour dans notre vie (1993)

Le baiser (The Kiss) is the fifth studio album by French new wave band, Indochine. It was released in 1990 and is the follow-up album to 7000 Danses.

== Track listing ==
- All lyrics by Nicola Sirkis. All music by Dominique Nicolas.
1. Le baiser - 4:10 (The Kiss)
2. Des fleurs pour Salinger - 3:14 (Flowers for Salinger)
3. More - 7:03
4. Alertez Managua - 3:55 (Alert Managua)
5. Les années bazar - 3:52 (The Bazaar Years)
6. Punishment Park - 3:50
7. Soudain l'été dernier, je suppose - 3:52 (Suddenly Last Summer, I Guess)
8. Les plus mauvaises nuits - 3:47 (The Worst Nights)
9. Persane Thème - 2:29
10. Tant de poussière - 4:35 (So Much Dust)
11. La colline des roses - 3:57 (The Hill of Roses)

== Personnel ==
=== Indochine ===
- Nicola Sirkis: Vocals, Harmonica
- Dominique Nicolas: Guitars, Bass, Synthesizers
- Stephane Sirkis: Bass, Guitars, Synthesizers
- Martin Hanlin: Drums, Percussion

=== Additional Personnel ===
- Juliette Binoche: Additional Vocals on "Punishment Park"
- Florence Agustin: Cello
- Claire Julien de la Ferrière: Clarinet
- Philippe Eidel: Piano, Synthesizers, Backing Vocals
- Mammoud Tabrizi-Zadeh: Santoor, Kemenche
