= Gang banger =

Gang banger may refer to:

- A participant in a gang bang
- A member of a gang
