= 3.6.3 =

Live album by Indochine
- Released: 2003
- Recorded: June 3, 2003
- Genre: New wave
- Length: 141:48

Indochine chronology
Paradize (2002)	3.6.3 (2003)	Alice & June (2005)

3.6.3 is the fifth live album by French new wave band Indochine. It was released in 2003.

== Track listing ==
Disc One
No.	Title	Length
1.	"Intro Nadja Death In Vegas" (L.A.M.F remix)	1:30
2.	"Venus"	5:04
3.	"Paradize"	5:12
4.	"Electrastar"	5:45
5.	"Trois Nuits Par Semaine"	6:30
6.	"Punker"	3:14
7.	"Astroboy"	4:26
8.	"Dark"	5:15
9.	"Le Grand Secret"	6:17
10.	"Mao Boy"	6:36
11.	"Popstitute"	4:22
12.	"J'Ai Demandé A La Lune"	6:15
13.	"Punishment Park"	6:39
14.	"Miss Paramount"	3:18

Disc Two
No.	Title	Length
1.	"Indo Club (Des Fleurs Pour Salinger – Canary Bay – La Machine à Rattraper Le Temps – Les Tzars – A L'Assaut (Des Ombres Sur L'O))"	11:23
2.	"Le Baiser"	6:32
3.	"Salômbo"	2:58
4.	"La Colline Des Roses"	1:50
5.	"Comateen I"	5:05
6.	"Anne Et Moi"	3:09
7.	"Tes Yeux Noirs"	4:53
8.	"3ème Sexe"	4:49
9.	"Marilyn"	6:54
10.	"L'Aventurier"	7:39
11.	"Dunkerque"	8:15
12.	"Glory Hole"	3:47
