= Un jour dans notre vie =

Studio album by Indochine
- Released: November 22, 1993
- Genre: New wave
- Length: 48:34
- Producer: Franck Redlich

Indochine chronology
Le baiser (1990)	Un jour dans notre vie (1993)	Radio Indochine (1994)

Un jour dans notre vie (A Day In Our Life) is the sixth studio album by French new wave band, Indochine. It was released in 1993 and is the follow-up album to Le baiser. It was released simultaneously in France and Canada with a limited release in Peru.

== Track listing ==
1. Savoure le rouge 4:23
2. Sur les toits du monde 5:07
3. Un jour dans notre vie 4:01
4. Anne et moi 3:14
5. La main sur vous 4:55
6. Some Days 3:42
7. Bienvenue chez les nus 4:07
8. D'ici mon amour 4:44
9. Candy prend son fusil 3:16
10. Ultra S. 4:25
11. Vietnam Glam 4:05
12. Crystal Song Telegram 2:35
