= Alice & June =

Studio album by Indochine
- Released: 19 December 2005
- Genre: Alternative rock
- Label: Sony BMG
- Producer: Indochine

Indochine chronology
3.6.3 (2004)	Alice & June (2005)	Hanoï (2007)

Alice & June is the tenth studio album by French band Indochine. It was released in France on 19 December 2005 in both single-disc and limited edition two disc editions. Even though it was a smaller success than Indochine's previous album (they sold more than a million copies of Paradize), the band played many sold-out shows on the tour that followed. A DVD, filmed at Lille, was released in 2007.

Brian Molko appears on the tracks "Pink Water 2" and "Pink Water 3".

== Track listing ==
=== Single disc edition ===
No.	Title	Length
1.	"Ceremonia" (Hidden track)	3:38
2.	"Les Portes Du Soir"	5:09
3.	"Alice & June"	3:42
4.	"Gang Bang"	3:24
5.	"Ladyboy"	4:47
6.	"Black Page"	4:13
7.	"Pink Water 3" (Brian Molko of Placebo)	4:59
8.	"Adora"	4:05
9.	"Un Homme Dans La Bouche"	4:36
10.	"June"	5:04
11.	"Sweet Dreams"	4:59
12.	"Belle Et Sebastiane"	3:34
13.	"Talulla"	2:53
14.	"Morphine"	5:13
15.	"Pink Water 2" (Brian Molko)	5:23

=== Double disc edition ===
==== Disc 1 – "Alice – Au pays des cauchemars – La promesse" ====
No.	Title	Length
1.	"La Promesse"	0:43
2.	"Les Portes Du Soir"	5:09
3.	"Alice & June"	3:42
4.	"Gang Bang"	3:24
5.	"Ladyboy"	4:47
6.	"Black Page"	4:13
7.	"Pink Water 3" (Brian Molko)	4:59
8.	"Adora"	4:05
9.	"Un Homme Dans La Bouche"	4:36
10.	"Vibrator"	2:24
11.	"Ceremonia"	3:38

==== Disc 2 – "June – Au pays des merveilles – Le pacte" ====
No.	Title	Length
1.	"Le Pacte"	0:40
2.	"June"	5:04
3.	"Sweet Dreams"	4:59
4.	"Belle Et Sebastiane"	3:34
5.	"Crash Me"	5:10
6.	"Aujourd'Hui Je Pleure" (AqME)	3:27
7.	"Harry Poppers" (Wampas)	2:56
8.	"Talulla"	2:53
9.	"Morphine"	5:13
10.	"Starlight" (Scala & Kolacny Brothers)	4:55
11.	"Pink Water 2" (Hidden track Brian Molko*)	5:23

- "Pink Water 2" is identical to "Pink Water 3", but it is sung in English.

== Certifications and sales ==
Country	Certification	Date	Sales certified	Physical sales
Belgium	Gold	31 December 2005	25,000	
France	2 x Gold	2006	200,000	356,900

== Charts ==
Chart (2005–2006)	Peak position
Belgian (Wallonia) Albums Chart	1
French SNEP Albums Chart	1
Swiss Albums Chart	17

End of year chart (2005)	Position
Belgian (Wallonia) Singles Chart	72
French Albums Chart	53
End of year chart (2006)	Position
Belgian (Wallonia) Singles Chart	16
French Albums Chart	33
