= Nuits intimes =

Nuit Intimes

Live album by Indochine
- Released: March 6, 2001
- Genre: New wave
- Length: 64:33

Indochine chronology
Dancetaria (1999)	Nuit Intimes (2001)	Paradize (2002)

Nuits intimes (Intimate Nights) is the fourth live album by French new wave band Indochine. It was released on March 6, 2001.

== Track listing ==
No.	Title	Length
1.	"Nuit intime"	1:24
2.	"Les plus mauvaises nuits"	2:01
3.	"Tes yeux noirs"	4:40
4.	"Atomic Sky"	3:51
5.	"D'ici mon amour"	4:10
6.	"Justine"	3:55
7.	"More"	6:12
8.	"Salombo"	3:04
9.	"3 nuits par semaine"	4:37
10.	"7000 danses"	5:27
11.	"Juste toi et moi"	2:51
12.	"A l'est de Java"	3:18
13.	"La colline des roses"	2:01
14.	"Ce soir le ciel"	4:15
15.	"Stef II"	5:33
16.	"Punishment Park"	4:05
