= Dancetaria =

Studio album by Indochine
- Released: August 24, 1999
- Recorded: December 1998 – March 1999 (Preproduction and voice); March – April 1999 (Recording)
- Genres: New wave, synth-pop
- Length: 56:54
- Labels: Double T Music; Sony
- Producers: Indochine, Jean-Pierre Pilot

Indochine chronology
INDO LIVE (1997)	Dancetaria (1999)	Nuits intimes (2001)

Dancetaria is the eighth studio album by French new wave band, Indochine. It was released in 1999 and is the follow-up album to Wax. It is the band's first release since the death of Stéphane Sirkis on February 27, 1999.

Four of the songs on the album include guitar riffs composed by Stéphane Sirkis shortly before his death. The demos he had made were reused at the time of the final mix: he is quoted in the credits of the album as a guitarist, posthumously.

== Track listing ==
All lyrics are written by Nicola Sirkis except "Halleluya" by Sirkis and Rudy Léonet; music composers are listed below.

No.	Title	Music composer(s)	Length
1.	"Dancetaria"	Nicola Sirkis, Jean-Pierre Pilot	7:26
2.	"Juste toi et moi"	Nicola Sirkis, Jean-Pierre Pilot	4:03
3.	"Manifesto (Les divisions de la joie)"	Stéphane Sirkis, Jean-Pierre Pilot	4:52
4.	"Justine"	Nicola Sirkis	3:50
5.	"Atomic Sky"	Stéphane Sirkis, Jean-Pierre Pilot	3:48
6.	"Rose Song"	Nicola Sirkis, Jean-Pierre Pilot	5:46
7.	"Stef II"	Stéphane Sirkis, Jean-Pierre Pilot	3:50
8.	"She Night"	Stéphane Sirkis, Jean-Pierre Pilot	4:38
9.	"Venus"	Nicola Sirkis	4:43
10.	"Astroboy"	Nicola Sirkis, Jean-Pierre Pilot	4:06
11.	"Halleluya"	Nicola Sirkis, Jean-Pierre Pilot	4:04
12.	"Le message"	Nicola Sirkis	4:48

== Personnel ==
Indochine

- Nicola Sirkis – vocals, guitars, backing vocals
- Stéphane Sirkis – guitars, Jaw's harp on "Stef II"
- Jean-Pierre Pilot – keyboards and programming, piano
- Boris Jardel – guitars
- Marc Éliard – bass
- Matthieu Rabaté – drums
- Olivier Gérard (oLi dE SaT) – arrangements, guitars, keyboards, sound effects

Production

- Phil Delire – engineer, mixing, montage
- Djoum – montage
- Gareth Jones – mixing
- peggy.m – concept
- Hervé Marignac – sound engineer
- Olivier Schultheis – orchestration
