= Wax (Indochine album) =

Studio album by Indochine
- Released: November 4, 1996
- Genre: New wave
- Length: 58:14

Indochine chronology
Radio Indochine (1995)	Wax (1996)	INDO LIVE (1997)

Wax is the seventh studio album by French new wave band Indochine. It was released on November 4, 1996.

== Track listing ==
No.	Title	Length
1.	"Unisexe"	5:03
2.	"Révolution"	4:50
3.	"Drugstar"	3:30
4.	"Je n'embrasse pas"	5:32
5.	"Coma, coma, coma"	4:36
6.	"Echo-Ruby"	5:10
7.	"Les silences de Juliette"	3:57
8.	"Satellite"	4:11
9.	"Mire-Live"	3:34
10.	"Ce soir, le ciel"	4:06
11.	"Kissing My Song"	4:04
12.	"L'amoureuse"	4:43
13.	"Peter Pan"	4:58
