= Dominik Nicolas =

French singer-songwriter

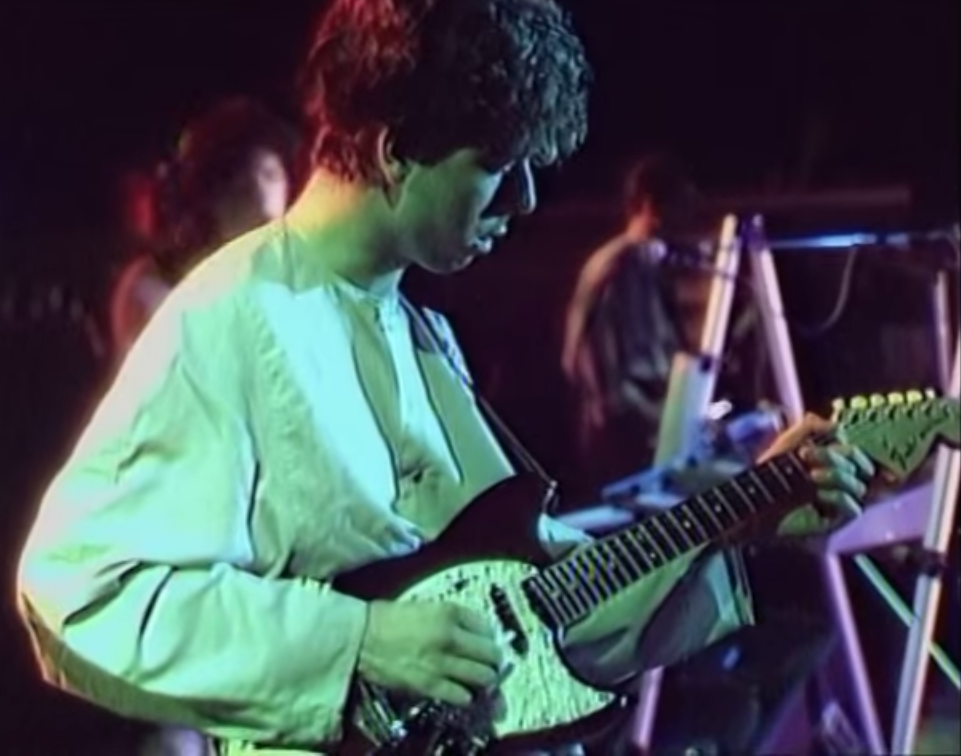

Background information
- Born: Dominique Maurice Nicolas; 5 July 1958 (age 68)
- Genres: New wave, Alternative rock, pop rock
- Occupations: Singer-songwriter, musician
- Instruments: Vocals, Guitar
- Years active: 1981–present
- Labels: Sony BMG; Jive/Epic
- Website: indo.fr

Dominik Nicolas (stage name) or Dominique Nicolas (born July 5, 1958 in Paris) is a French musician and composer. He is a co-founder of the band Indochine, for whom he composed most of the band's biggest hits such as L'Aventurier, 3e sexe, Trois nuits par semaine, Canary Bay or Tes yeux noirs.

Since departing Indochine, he has pursued a solo career.
