= Le Péril jaune =

Studio album by Indochine
- Released: November 28, 1983
- Recorded: October 1983
- Studio: Jacob's Studio (London)
- Genre: New wave, rock
- Length: 35:56
- Label: Ariola, Clemence Melody, Stranded Rekords
- Producer: Indochine, Simaen Skolfield

Indochine chronology
L'Aventurier (1982)	Le Péril jaune (1983)	3 (1985)

Le Péril jaune (The Yellow Peril) is the second studio album by French new wave post-punk band, Indochine. It was released in 1983 in France, Germany, Sweden, Netherlands and Spain.

== Track listing ==
- All songs written by Nicolas Sirchis and Dominique Nicolas, except where noted.
1. Le Péril jaune (Ouverture) - 0:48 (N. Sirchis)
2. La Sécheresse du Mékong - 3:28
3. Razzia - 3:38
4. Pavillon rouge - 3:08
5. Okinawa - 4:53
6. Tonkin - 2:11 (Nicolas)
7. Miss Paramount - 3:00
8. Shangaï - 2:40
9. Kao Bang - 5:29
10. À l'est de Java - 5:03
11. Le Péril jaune (Fermeture) - 1:31 (N. Sirchis)

== Personnel ==
- Nicolas Sirchis: Vocals, keyboards, synthesizers
- Dominique Nicolas: Guitars, synthesizers
- Stéphane Sirchis: Keyboards, synthesizers
- Dimitry Bodiansky: Saxophone
- Philippe Eidel: Synthesizer and Linn drum programming
