= Paradize =

Studio album by Indochine
- Released: 14 May 2002
- Genre: New wave
- Length: 74:50
- Label: Columbia
- Producer: Indochine

Indochine chronology
Nuits intimes (2001)	Paradize (2002)	3.6.3 (2003)

Professional ratings
Review scores
Source	Rating
AllMusic	3.5/5 stars

Paradize is a 2002 album recorded by French band Indochine. It was its ninth studio album and was released on 14 May 2002. It achieved great success in francophone countries and even topped the albums chart in Belgium (Wallonia). It provided six singles, which became hit singles : "Punker" (#67 in France), "J'ai demandé à la lune" (#1 in France and Belgium, #4 in Switzerland), "Mao Boy" (#18 in France, #20 in Belgium), "Le grand secret" (#9 in France, #35 in Belgium, #37 in Switzerland), "Marilyn" (#22 in France, #25 in Belgium, #71 in Switzerland) and "Un singe en hiver" (#19 in France, #15 in Belgium, #69 in Switzerland). The French edition of Rolling Stone magazine named this album the 98th greatest French rock album (out of 100).

== Versions ==
1. PARADIZE (CD, Album), Columbia (COL5076362, 5076362000), France (2002)
2. PARADIZE (CD, Album), Zone 3 (ZCD-1000), Canada (2002)
3. PARADIZE (Cass), Columbia/Sony Müzik Türkiye (507636-4), Turkey (2002)
4. PARADIZE (CD, Album), Sony Music (2 507636), Mexico (2003)
5. PARADIZE (CD, Album, RE), Sony Music (LC00000), France (2012)

== Track listing ==
No.	Title	Length
1.	"Paradize" (Olivier Gérard, Ann Scott, Nicola Sirkis)	4:49
2.	"Electrastar" (Olivier Gérard, Nicola Sirkis)	5:30
3.	"Punker" (Nicola Sirkis)	2:50
4.	"Mao Boy!" (music video shot & directed by J.G BIGGS and Peggy M Olivier Gérard, Nicola Sirkis)	5:42
5.	"J'ai demandé à la lune" (Mickaël Furnon)	3:29
6.	"Dunkerque" (Olivier Gérard, Nicola Sirkis)	5:48
7.	"Like a Monster" (Nicola Sirkis, Jérôme Soligny)	3:56
8.	"Le grand secret" (Melissa Auf der Maur, Olivier Gérard, Nicola Sirkis)	5:50
9.	"La nuit des fées" (Olivier Gérard, Gérard Manset, Nicola Sirkis)	4:58
10.	"Marilyn" (Olivier Gérard, Nicola Sirkis)	5:55
11.	"Le manoir" (Olivier Gérard, Boris Jardel, Nicola Sirkis)	5:05
12.	"Popstitute" (Marc Eliard, Olivier Gérard, Boris Jardel, Mathieu Rabaté, Nicola Sirkis)	4:00
13.	"Dark" (Marc Eliard, Olivier Gérard, Boris Jardel, Mathieu Rabaté, Nicola Sirkis)	4:37
14.	"Comateen" (Olivier Gérard, Rudy Leonet, Nicola Sirkis)	6:07
15.	"Un singe en hiver" (Jean-Louis Murat)	3:46

== Personnel ==
- Nicola Sirkis : Vocals/Guitar/Keyboards/Synths
- Oli de Sat : Guitar/Keyboards/Synths
- Marc Eliard : Bass/Background vocals
- Boris Jardel : Guitar/Background vocals
- Mathieu Rabaté : Drums
- Background vocals : Marc Morgan
- Engineer : Phil Delire
- Pro-tools : Jean-Paul Gonnod and Phil Delire
- Mixing : Gareth Jones and Phil Delire
- Mastering : George Marino
- Art direction, photo and logo : Peggy M.
- Executive producer : Herve Lauzanne

== Charts and sales ==
=== Weekly charts ===
Chart (2002/04)	Peak position
Belgian (Wallonia) Albums Chart	1
French SNEP Albums Chart	2
Swiss Albums Chart	6

=== Year-end charts ===
Chart (2002)	Position
Belgian (Wallonia) Albums Chart	4
Canadian Alternative Albums (Nielsen SoundScan)	196
French Albums Chart	7
Swiss Singles Chart	29
Chart (2003)	Position
Belgian (Wallonia) Albums Chart	47
French Albums Chart	24

=== Certifications ===
Country	Certification	Date	Sales certified	Physical sales
Belgium	Platinum	7 September 2002	50,000	
France	Diamond	2004	1,000,000	1,090,000
Switzerland	Gold	2002	20,000	
