= Indochine (band) =

French rock and new wave band

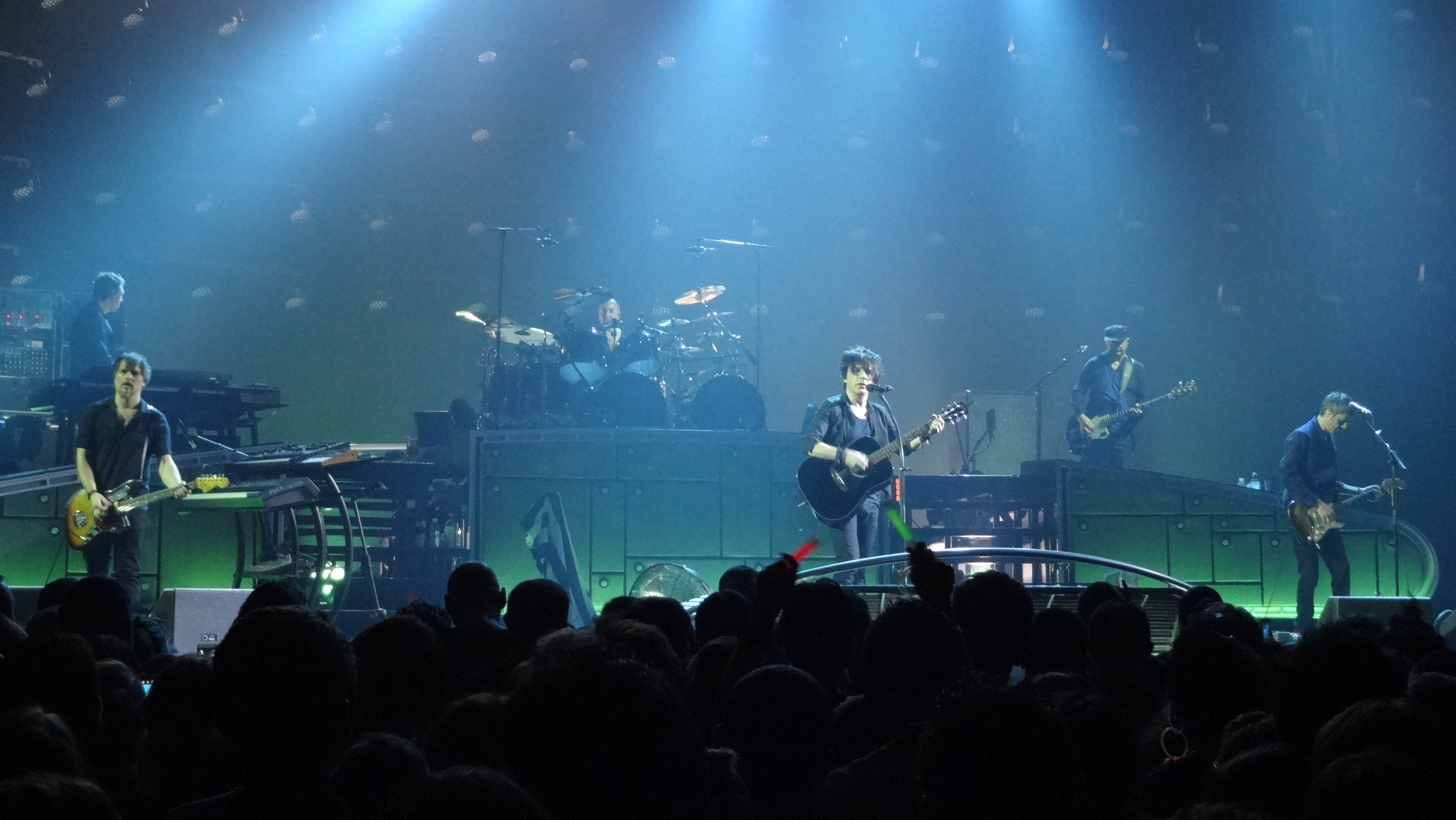
- Indochine performing live during the Black City Tour, 2013

Background information
- Origin: Paris, France
- Genres: Rock, new wave
- Years active: 1981–present
- Labels: Sony BMG, Jive, Epic, Ariola, Clemence Melody, Stranded, Columbia, Indochine, Tourneur Live Nation
- Members: Nicola Sirkis; Boris Jardel; Olivier Gérard; Marc Eliard; Ludwig Dahlberg
- Past members: Stéphane Sirkis; Dominique Nicolas; Dimitri Bodiansky; Arnaud Devos; Jean-My Truong; Jean Pierre Pilot; Alexandre Azaria; Monsieur Tox; Monsieur Yann; Matthieu Rabaté; Monsieur Frédéric; François Soulier "Mr Shoes"; François Matuszenski "Matu"
- Website: www.indo.fr

Indochine (French pronunciation: [ɛ̃dɔʃin]) is a French rock and new wave band formed in Paris in 1981. It achieved significant success in the 1980s across the Francophone world, Europe, and Latin America with hit songs L'Aventurier and Canary Bay. After releasing several critically praised but commercially disappointing albums in the 1990s, the band experienced a resurgence with the 2002 album Paradize. To date, Indochine has sold over 10 million albums and singles worldwide.

== History ==
=== 1980s ===
Indochine (French for Indochina) was formed in 1981 by two Frenchmen in their early twenties, Nicola Sirkis and Dominique Nicolas, in Paris. They soon added Dimitri Bodiansky, the cousin of one of Nicola's friends.

They gave their first concert at Le Rose Bonbon, a café in Paris on 29 September 1981. This brief performance on stage earned them their first contract with a record company.

They recorded their first single in November 1981. It included two songs, "Dizzidence Politik" and "Françoise", but drew more attention from critics than from the mainstream media and only reached a limited audience.

Stéphane Sirkis, Nicola's twin brother who had already performed with the band on stage, officially joined the band, and in April 1982 the group recorded their first album, L'Aventurier, which sold more than 250,000 copies. The album was well received by the press and by an emerging new wave audience.

L'aventurier was the song of the summer 1983 in France.

In 1983, Indochine released a second album entitled Le Péril Jaune ("Yellow Peril") which sold 225,000 copies. Indochine had by this stage become a major act in French music. In 1984, the band toured France. They were also successful in Scandinavia, most notably in Sweden. The Swedish releases of the singles "Kao Bang" (and later "Canary Bay") became hugely successful, spending several weeks on the Swedish top 10 sales chart and on the radio chart Trackslistan. Arriving at the venue for a show in Stockholm soon after, the band were met by hundreds of screaming fans described as similar to Beatlemania.

By 1985, they had achieved a large following, reflected by the success of such songs as "Troisième sexe" ("third sex"), "Canary Bay", and "Trois nuits par semaine". Their third album, 3, sold 750,000 copies in Europe. Serge Gainsbourg directed the video to "Tes yeux noirs", one of the group's most successful songs.

Indochine becomes the largest "new wave" band in France. The single "L'Aventurier" won the French awards "bus d'acier 1983".

In 1986, to celebrate the fifth anniversary of the band, Indochine decided to release the recording of the concert given at the Zénith in Paris.

Their fourth album, 7000 Danses, produced by Joe Glasman, was released in 1987. It sold about 320,000 copies making it a successful album though far less so than its predecessor, 3. This is partly due to the band's efforts to produce a less mainstream, commercial album. 7000 Danses was also released amidst a controversy stemming from rock critics claiming that Indochine were a mere copy of British band The Cure. In spite of the controversy fans continued to support the group.

==== 1988 Tour ====
Starting in 1986 the band gained a following in Lima, Peru as a result of the radio broadcast of their 'L'Aventurier' single. Then, in early 1987, the small record label, El Virrey, negotiated the rights to the 'Au Zénith' album, which it released as 33 rpm LP and on cassette tape.

Surprised by this development, Indochine decided to add a stop in Lima after their transatlantic debut in Montreal. Following their appearance in Montreal on 6 April 1988, the band traveled to Peru. There, they performed before their Lima fans in four shows, on 29 and 30 April, and on 6 and 7 May 1988, at the Coliseo Amauta, reaching a total audience of over 40,000 people. In that period the band sold some 400,000 recordings in Peru.

That was the only Indochine tour in the late 1980s. For this tour the quartet had the participation of guest musicians such as Diego Burgard (Bass) and Jean-My Truong (Drums), a documentary about the tour was filmed in different cities in Europe, Canada and Peru and it was released for sale on VHS tape in 1989.

=== 1990s ===
Drained after many months touring, the band took a break. Their fifth studio album, Le Baiser, was released in early 1990. Fans were shocked to discover that Dimitri Bodiansky was no longer part of the group, having decided to leave the band in January 1989 . His departure can be attributed to a number of reasons. First of all, Indochine's sound had evolved over the years and Bodiansky found he had less and less to do as a saxophonist. He was also feeling pressure at home having recently become a father. All this contributed to tension between him and the rest of the band. Bodiansky remains a much loved member of the original Indochine line-up and since his departure has guest starred with the band on stage.

1991 marked Indochine's tenth anniversary. To celebrate the occasion, Le Birthday Album was released. It was a best of compilation, including one new track, "La Guerre Est Finie" ("The War Is Over"), which was released as a single. The album's success was considerable (it sold 600,000 copies across Europe) and rekindled interest in the group. However, the single's title proved unfortunate in light of the fact that the Persian Gulf War had just started at the time. For this reason, many radio stations opted not to play the track.

Un jour dans notre vie, their sixth studio album, was released in 1993. It proved unsuccessful, both commercially and critically.

"Un jour dans notre vie" wins French awards " video clip fantastique Gerardmer 1994"

On 27 February 1999, Stéphane Sirkis, guitarist, keyboardist and Nicola's twin brother, died at the age of 39 of hepatitis. He had requested that the band continue after his death.

=== 2000s ===
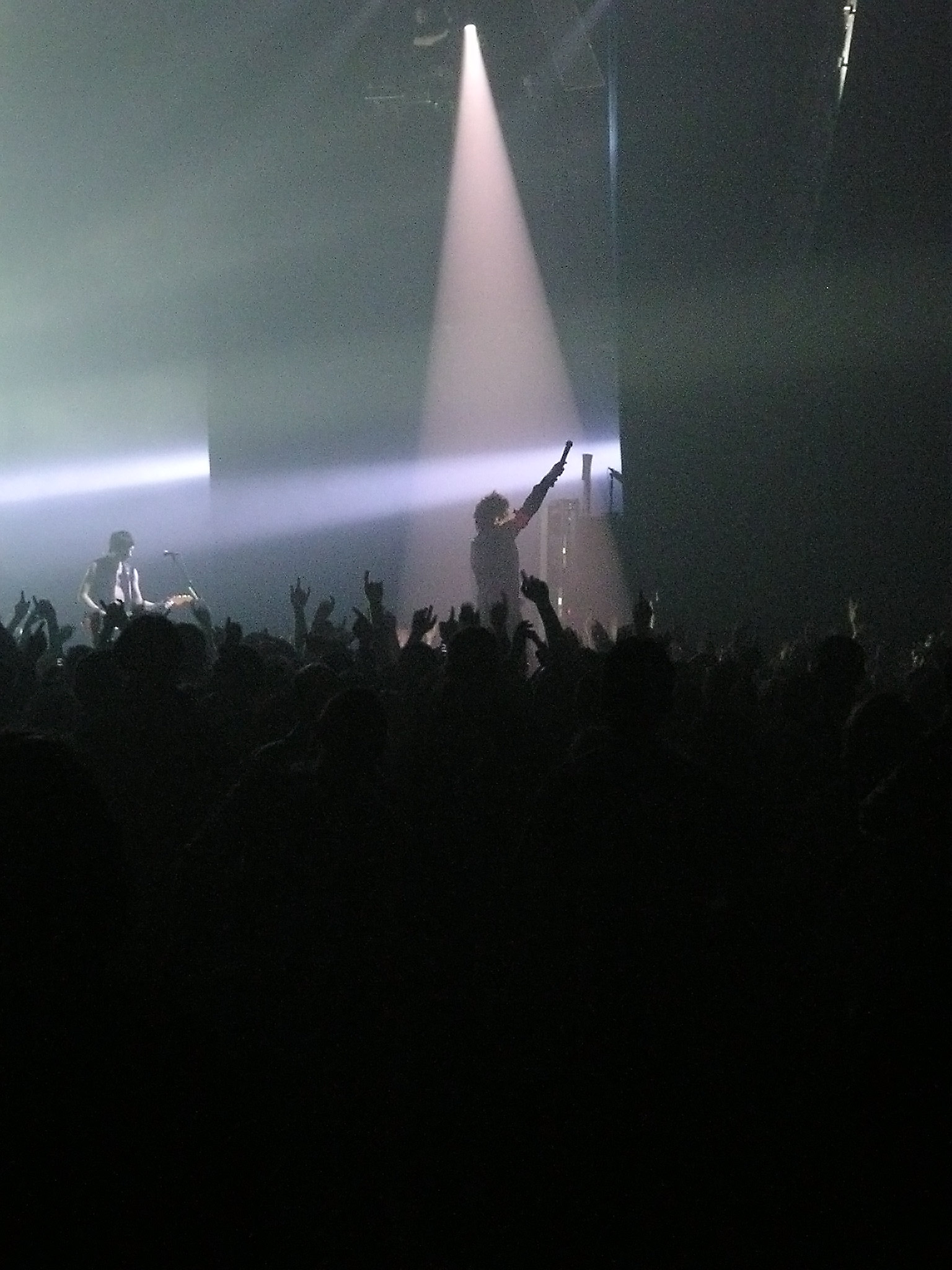
Concert of Indochine, Paradize Tour (2003, France)

In October 2000, the band started a small but successful acoustic tour named Nuits Intimes. The album is released in January 2001.

2001 begins. Nicola and Oli de Sat compose most of the album Paradize that would be released the next year. Ann Scott, Camille Laurens, Mickey 3D, Gerard Manset, Jean-Louis Murat and Melissa Auf der Maur collaborated on the album.

In 2002, they enjoyed renewed success with the Paradize album which sold 1,000,000 copies, including the chart topper J'ai demandé à la lune.This album has marked a change in aesthetics and genre, moving towards a darker tone and more introspective lyrics, influenced by popular acts such as Nine Inch Nails, Placebo and Marilyn Manson.

In 2003, the band received the MTV Europe Music Awards for: "Best French Act", the NRJ Music Awards for: "Album of the year" and La Victoires de la Musique for: "Best pop album of the year"

In December 2005, Indochine returned with Alice & June, featuring a collaboration with Placebo frontman Brian Molko. On 6 and 7 June 2006, the group had a concert in Hanoi Opera House to celebrate their 25th anniversary.

In December 2007, Indochine released a triple live DVD and double CD album entitled Alice & June Tour. The album featured the full concert recorded in Lille, France in March 2007.

In 2008 Indochine joins the Reporters Sans Frontières campaign, for the boycott of the Beijing Olympic Games's opening ceremony. The cover of the 80's single 'You Spin me Round' is released (all the collected founds were entirely given to RSF).

Their 11th studio album, La République des Meteors, was released on 9 March 2009. The album marked a change in their musical style, slowly moving away from the dark and quirky realms they had explored with "Paradize" and "Alice & June".

=== 2010s ===
Indochine was the first French band to perform at the Stade de France, on 26 June 2010 their biggest gig ever, sold out and in front of 80,000 people.

In November 2012, the band released their new single Memoria, from their upcoming album Black City Parade.

Black City Parade was released on 11 February 2013 with much anticipation from the fans. The album, despite its almost gloomy cover art, features much brighter and warmer music than the last two albums. The band seemed to want include references to their synthpop and new wave beginnings. Indochine played several sold-out shows during the first leg of the "Black City Tour" which kicked off on 21 February 2013. Five legs are planned for the "Black City Tour". The band stated that they will be playing around the world. They later announced that they will return to the Stade de France on 27 June 2014.

The second single for Black City Parade was College Boy, a song widely acknowledged to narrate the life of a homosexual teenage boy dealing with bashing and harassment. The video for the single was directed by Canadian filmmaker Xavier Dolan. The video premiered online with a disclaimer stating that it contained violent scenes and would not be suitable for a young audience. The video depicts a young male student facing mobbing and harassment from his schoolmates. The video culminates in him being brutally crucified and shot in the torso by his fellow students. Many criticisms have poured over the Internet about whether the video should be broadcast or not.

The band played two nights at the Stade de France on 27 & 28 June 2014. They followed the stadium concerts with a much smaller show at London's O2 Shepherd's Bush Empire on 14 July 2014.

In April 2015, the band undertook the eight dates Europe City Club Tour, which saw the band extend beyond its Francophone base by visiting Spain, Germany, Sweden, Denmark, Norway and the Netherlands.

2016 was the year of The Festival Tours with performances at Papillons De Nuit (20 May), Les Ardentes (6 July), Carcassonne festival (15 July), Sion Sous Les Etoiles (18 July), Poupet (22 July), La Fête Du Bruit (12 August) and Cabaret Vert (25 August).

Their 13th album, named 13 (2017) had a big success in France, with singles like Un été français or La vie est belle.

In 2020 the band announced a new tour to come in 2021 to celebrate their 40 years of career, the Central Tour, with 5 dates in the biggest French stadiums, making their 4th Stade de France.

=== 2020s ===
The group released their single "Le chant des cygnes" on June 14, 2024. The release of this title is accompanied by the release of the 14th album on September 7, 2024 and the launch of a 68-date tour in the biggest French and Belgian concert halls.

== Band members ==
Current Members

- Nicola Sirkis – lead vocals, guitars, synthesizers, harmonica (1981–present)
- Marc Eliard – bass guitar (1992–present)
- Boris Jardel – guitars (1998–present)
- oLi dE SaT (Olivier Gérard) – keyboards, guitars (1999–present)
- Ludwig Dahlberg – drums (1995–present)

Past Members

- Dominique Nicolas – guitars (1981–1994)
- Dimitri Bodiansky – saxophone (1981–1988)
- Stéphane Sirkis – guitars, keyboards (1982–1999; his death)
- Arnaud Devos – drums (1985–1986)
- Jean-My Truong – drums (1988–1994)
- Jean Pierre Pilot – keyboards (1994–2001)
- Alexandre Azaria – guitars (1995–1997)
- Monsieur Tox – guitars (1996–1997)
- Monsieur Yann – drums (1996–1998)
- Matthieu Rabaté – drums (1999–2002)
- Monsieur Frédéric (Frédéric Helbert) – keyboards (2002–2004)
- Mr Shoes (François Soulier) – drums (2002–2015)
- Mr Matu (Francois Matuszenski) – keyboards (2005–2015)

== Discography ==
- L'aventurier (1982)
- Le péril jaune (1983)
- 3 (1985)
- 7000 danses (1987)
- Le baiser (1990)
- Un jour dans notre vie (1993)
- Wax (1996)
- Dancetaria (1999)
- Paradize (2002)
- Alice & June (2005)
- La république des meteors (2009)
- Black City Parade (2013)
- 13 (2017)
- Babel Babel (2024)

== Biography ==
- Indochine (1986) by Jean-Eric Perrin
- Le Septennat (1988) by Marc Thirion
- Indochine de A à Z (2003) by Sébastien Bataille
- L'Aventure Indochine (2004) by Christian English and Frédéric Thibaud
- Insolence Rock (2004) by Sébastien Michaud
- Le Roman Vrai d'Indochine (2005) by Jean-Claude Perrier
- Sur la Muraille d'Indochine (2007) by Phillipe Crocq
- Indochine Story (2009) by Anouk Vincent
- Kissing my song (2011) by Agnès Michaux
