= Mylène Farmer discography =

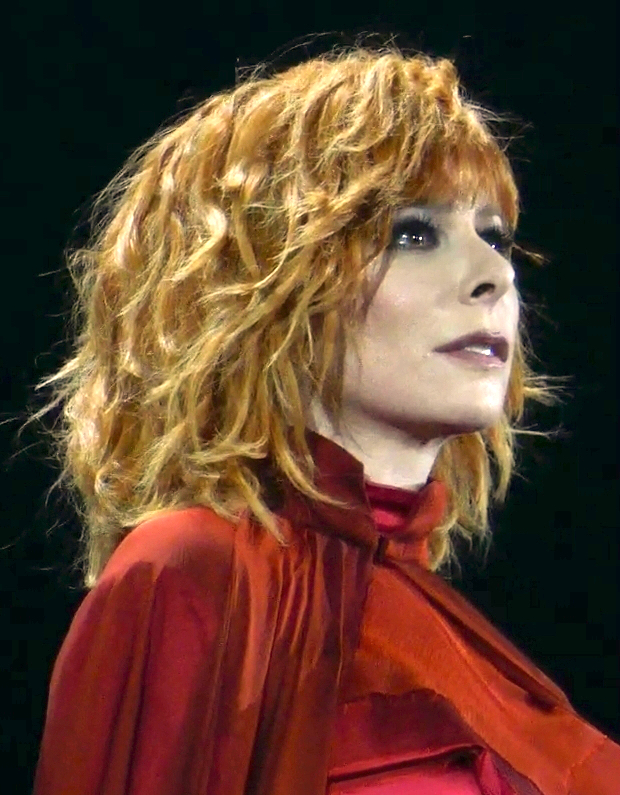
- Mylène Farmer live in Paris La Défense Arena in June 2019
- Studio albums: 13
- Live albums: 8
- Compilation albums: 9
- Singles: 67
- Video albums: 11
- Music videos: 48

Mylène Farmer is a French pop singer-songwriter who has released thirteen studio albums, nine compilation albums – three of which are remix albums – eight live albums, sixty-six singles and seventeen home videos. She is referred to as the "Queen of French Pop" and has sold over 35 million records worldwide throughout her career. Farmer was the first female artist in history to sell out the 80,000 capacity Stade de France two nights in a row. Ainsi soit je... was the best-selling album by a woman during the 80s decade in France. Les mots is the highest-selling greatest hits collection in French history. "Désenchantée" remains as the best-selling single by a female artist in France. Farmer has achieved 21 No. 1 hits including 58 Top 10 hits on SNEP, spending 39 weeks atop the chart (behind only Céline Dion for any artists), and 15 No. 1 albums including 8 diamond-certified albums in France.

Her debut album, Cendres de lune, was released in April 1986 and contained her first hit single, "Libertine". The album was re-released in 1987 with "Tristana", another top ten single in France. On the French Albums Chart, Cendres de lune debuted in 1989, after the success of Farmer's second album, and peaked at number 39 in June 1989. In April 1988, Farmer released her second album, Ainsi soit je.... Thanks to her first number-one single in France, "Pourvu qu'elles soient douces", the album topped the chart as well for two weeks in December 1988. It also contained three more hits: "Sans contrefaçon", "Ainsi soit je..." and "Sans logique". The album was certified Diamond in France and has sold 1.5 million copies there. It was followed by Farmer's first live album, En concert, which was released in December 1989 and became her second top ten album in France, reaching number nine in February 1990. Farmer's third studio album, L'autre..., was released in April 1991, led by her best-selling single, "Désenchantée", which topped the French Singles Chart for nine weeks and also charted in several other countries. The album spawned three more top ten hits: "Regrets", "Je t'aime mélancolie", and "Beyond My Control". With twenty weeks atop of the French chart, Diamond certification and 1.8 million copies sold, L'autre... became Farmer's most successful album to date.

Her next studio album, Anamorphosée, was released in October 1995, led by the number-one single, "XXL". It topped the French Albums Chart for two weeks in January 1997 and was certified Diamond in 2009, selling 1.2 million copies. To promote the album, Farmer embarked on a tour in 1996, which was recorded and released as Live à Bercy in May 1997, reaching number two on the albums chart. Farmer's fifth studio album, Innamoramento, was released in April 1999. Although it narrowly missed reaching the top spot (stalling at number two), it has sold 1.3 million copies in France and achieved Diamond status. The album provided five top ten hits, including "L'Âme-stram-gram", "Souviens-toi du jour" and the title track - all of which made the top five. Farmer's next live album, Mylenium Tour, was released in December 2000 and topped the chart for one week. In November 2001, Farmer released her first greatest hits album entitled Les mots. It became one of the best-selling compilation albums of all time in France with approximately 1.6 million copies sold. The album also contained some new material, including the songs: "Les mots" (duet with Seal), "C'est une belle journée" and "Pardonne-moi", all of which became top ten hits in France. Farmer's sixth and seventh studio albums, Avant que l'ombre... and Point de suture, were released respectively in April 2005 and in August 2008, reaching number one. Point de suture gave Farmer five number-one singles. In addition, she released two commercially successful DVDs of her 2006 and 2009 tours, Avant que l'ombre... à Bercy and N°5 on Tour.

Farmer's eighth studio album Bleu noir, released in December 2010, topped the chart and was certified Diamond in France. The lead single of the album, "Oui mais... non", topped the chart in France as well. The next two singles, "Bleu noir" and "Lonely Lisa", also reached number one. A greatest hits album titled 2001.2011 was released in December 2011 and debuted at number three on the French Albums Chart. In November 2012, Farmer released her ninth studio album, Monkey Me, which debuted at number one and spawned three singles: chart-topping "À l'ombre", and "Je te dis tout" and "Monkey Me", both peaking at number three. The album was supported by the tour, which led to the recording and release of the live album and video, Timeless 2013. In November 2015, Farmer's tenth studio album Interstellaires was released, with "Stolen Car", a duet with Sting, as lead single. Both debuted at number one on the French charts. The song was a remake of one of Sting's earlier songs, and it also reached number 1 on the Billboard Dance Club Play chart. In September 2018, Farmer released her eleventh studio album, Désobéissance, which topped the chart. Singles from Désobéissance also topped the sales chart, giving Farmer her twentieth number-ones there.

L'Emprise, was released in 2022, reaching number one in France, Belgium and Switzerland.

Her last album ,Égrégore,was released in 2026, reaching number one in France

== Albums ==
=== Studio albums ===
Title	Album details	Peak chart positions										Sales	Certifications
Title	Album details	FRA	BEL (FL)	BEL (WA)	EU	GER	NLD	RUS	SWE	SWI	SWI RO	Sales	Certifications
Cendres de lune	Released: April 1986; Label: Polydor; Formats: CD, LP, cassette	39	—	—	—	—	—	—	—	—	—	FRA: 400,000	FRA: 2× Gold
Ainsi soit je...	Released: April 1988; Label: Polydor; Formats: CD, LP, cassette	1	—	—	10	47	—	—	—	—	—	FRA: 1,500,000	FRA: Diamond; BEL: Gold; SWI: Gold
L'autre...	Released: 9 April 1991; Label: Polydor; Formats: CD, LP, cassette	1	—	1	15	55	57	—	45	27	—	FRA: 1,800,000	FRA: Diamond; BEL: Platinum; SWI: Gold
Anamorphosée	Released: 17 October 1995; Label: Polydor; Formats: CD, LP, cassette	1	—	2	19	—	—	—	—	25	43	FRA: 1,200,000	FRA: Diamond; BEL: Platinum; EU: Platinum; SWI: Gold
Innamoramento	Released: 7 April 1999; Label: Polydor; Formats: CD, LP, cassette	2	40	2	30	—	—	—	—	59	8	FRA: 1,300,000	FRA: Diamond; BEL: Platinum; EU: Platinum; SWI: Platinum; Export : 2×Gold
Avant que l'ombre...	Released: 4 April 2005; Label: Polydor; Formats: CD, LP, digital	1	48	1	14	—	—	—	—	2	5	FRA: 600,000	FRA: 2× Platinum; BEL: Gold; RUS: 2x Platinum; Export :Silver
Point de suture	Released: 20 August 2008; Label: Polydor; Formats: CD, LP, digital	1	32	1	13	—	—	—	—	2	12	FRA: 475,000	FRA: 3× Platinum; BEL: Platinum; RUS: 2× Platinum; SWI: Gold; Export : Gold
Bleu noir	Released: 6 December 2010; Label: Polydor; Formats: CD, LP, digital	1	72	1	—	—	—	3	—	7	1	FRA: 520,000	FRA: Diamond; BEL: Platinum; RUS: Platinum; SWI: Gold
Monkey Me	Released: 3 December 2012; Label: Polydor; Formats: CD, LP, digital	1	29	1	—	—	—	—	—	3	1	FRA: 430,000	FRA: 3× Platinum; BEL: Platinum; Export :Gold
Interstellaires	Released: 6 November 2015; Label: Polydor; Formats: CD, LP, digital	1	21	1	—	79	79	—	—	3	1	FRA: 350,000	FRA: 3× Platinum; BEL: Gold
Désobéissance	Released: 28 September 2018; Label: Sony; Formats: CD, LP, digital	1	19	1	—	—	—	—	—	3	1	FRA: 280,000	FRA: 2× Platinum
L'Emprise	Released: 25 November 2022; Label: Stuffed Monkey; Formats: CD, LP, digital	1	47	1	—	—	—	—	—	1	1	FRA: 200,000	FRA: 2× Platinum
Égrégore	Released: 30 October 2026; Label: Stuffed Monkey; Formats: CD, LP, digital	1	15	2	—	—	—	—	—	2	1	• FRA:50,000	•FRA : Gold
"—" denotes a recording that did not chart or was not released in that territory.

=== Live albums ===
Title	Album details	Peak chart positions							Sales	Certifications
Title	Album details	FRA	BEL (FL)	BEL (WA)	EU	RUS	SWI	SWI RO	Sales	Certifications
En concert	Released: 4 December 1989; Label: Polydor; Formats: CD, LP, cassette	9	—	48	46	—	—	—	FRA: 250,000	FRA: 2× Gold
Live à Bercy	Released: 21 May 1997; Label: Polydor; Formats: CD, LP, cassette	2	—	2	17	—	—	—	FRA: 750,000	FRA: 2× Platinum; BEL: Gold; SWI: Gold; Export: Gold
Mylenium Tour	Released: 5 December 2000; Label: Polydor; Formats: CD, LP, cassette	1	—	8	20	—	31	47	FRA: 650,000	FRA: 2× Platinum; BEL: Gold
Avant que l'ombre... à Bercy	Released: 4 December 2006; Label: Polydor; Formats: CD, LP, digital	1	—	3	14	—	18	40	FRA: 180,000	FRA: Gold
N°5 on Tour	Released: 7 December 2009; Label: Polydor; Formats: CD, LP, digital	1	99	1	13	6	14	10	FRA: 200,000	FRA: 2× Platinum; BEL: Gold
Timeless 2013	Released: 9 December 2013; Label: Polydor; Formats: CD, LP, digital	2	82	2	—	—	13	2	FRA: 160,000	FRA: Platinum; BEL: Gold
Live 2019	Released: 18 October 2019; Label: Sony; Formats: CD, LP, digital	1	47	1	—	—	2	1	FRA: 130,000	FRA: Platinum
Nevermore	Released: 27 September 2024; Label: Stuffed Monkey, Sony; Formats: CD, LP, digital	1	149	1	—	—	4	1	FRA: 100,000	FRA: Platinum
"—" denotes a recording that did not chart or was not released in that territory.

=== Compilation albums ===
Title	Album details	Peak chart positions						Sales	Certifications
Title	Album details	FRA	BEL (FL)	BEL (WA)	EU	SWI	SWI RO	Sales	Certifications
Dance Remixes	Released: 23 November 1992; Label: Polydor; Formats: CD, LP, cassette	3 (Note: Peak position on the Compilations Chart.)	—	—	—	—	—	FRA: 400,000	FRA: 2× Gold
Les mots	Released: 26 November 2001; Label: Polydor; Formats: CD, LP, cassette	1 (Note: Peak position on the Compilations Chart.)	—	1	98	6	—	FRA: 1,600,000	FRA: Diamond; BEL: 2× Platinum; EU: Platinum; SWI: Gold; Export : Gold
RemixeS	Released: 28 November 2003; Label: Polydor; Formats: CD, LP, cassette	3 (Note: Peak position on the Compilations Chart.)	—	15	—	81	—	FRA: 150,000	FRA: Gold
2001.2011	Released: 5 December 2011; Label: Polydor; Formats: CD, LP, digital	1 (Note: Peak position on the Compilations Chart. On the Albums Chart, 2001.2011 reached number three.)	—	10	—	36	8	FRA: 200,000	FRA: 2× Platinum; BEL: Gold
Histoires de	Released: 4 December 2020; Label: Sony; Formats: CD, LP, digital	2	—	2	—	5	40	FRA: 180,000	FRA: Platinum
Plus grandir	Released: 20 August 2021; Label: Polydor; Formats: CD, LP, cassette, digital	1	153	1	—	69	6	FRA: 120,000	FRA: Platinum
Collection	Released: 28 October 2022; Label: Polydor; Formats: CD, digital	21	—	11	—	—	22		
Remix XL	Released: 19 April 2024; Label: Sony; Formats: LP, CD, digital	2	181	2	—	5	2	FRA: 45,000	
86/97	Released: 11 July 2025; Label: Polydor; Formats: CD, LP, digital	2	—	5	—	76	—	FRA: 50,000	FRA: Gold
"—" denotes a recording that did not chart or was not released in that territory.

== Singles ==
=== Commercial singles ===
Year	Title	Peak chart positions										Certifications	Album
Year	Title	FRA (Sales)	FRA (Stream & DL)	BEL (FL)	BEL (WA)	EU	GER	NLD	QB	SWI	SWI RO	Certifications	Album
1984	"Maman a tort" / "My Mum Is Wrong"	104 (Note: Originally "Maman a tort" did not chart in 1984, but it peaked at number 104 in 2014 due to the digital downloads.)		—		—	—	—	—	—			Cendres de lune
1985	"On est tous des imbéciles"	—		—		—	—	—	—	—			—N/a
1985	"Plus grandir"	19 (Note: Originally "Plus grandir" did not chart in 1985, but it peaked at number nineteen on the sales chart in December 2017 due to the reissued vinyl single.)		—		—	—	—	—	—			Cendres de lune
1986	"Libertine"	1 (Note: "Libertine" originally peaked at number ten in 1986. In February 2018, it reached number one on the sales chart due to the reissued vinyl single.)		—		34	—	—	32	—		FRA: Silver	Cendres de lune
1987	"Tristana"	5 (Note: "Tristana" originally peaked at number seven in 1987. In September 2018, it reached number five on the sales chart due to the reissued vinyl single.)		—		50	—	—	17	—		FRA: Silver	Cendres de lune
1987	"Sans contrefaçon"	2		—		9	46	—	7	—			Ainsi soit je...
1988	"Ainsi soit je..."	5 (Note: "Ainsi soit je..." originally peaked at number twelve in 1988. In April 2018, it reached number five on the sales chart due to the reissued vinyl single.)		—		47	—	—	—	—			Ainsi soit je...
1988	"Pourvu qu'elles soient douces"	1		29		6	—	56	7	—		FRA: Gold	Ainsi soit je...
1989	"Sans logique"	6 (Note: "Sans logique" originally peaked at number ten in 1989. In September 2018, it reached number six on the sales chart due to the reissued vinyl single.)		—		39	—	—	—	—			Ainsi soit je...
1989	"À quoi je sers..."	3 (Note: "À quoi je sers..." originally peaked at number sixteen in 1989. In February 2018, it reached number three on the sales chart due to the reissued vinyl single.)		—		67	—	—	—	—			En concert
1989	"Allan" (live)	10 (Note: "Allan" (live) originally peaked at number thirty-two in 1990. In April 2018, it reached number ten on the sales chart due to the reissued vinyl single.)		—		99	—	—	—	—			En concert
1990	"Plus grandir" (live mix)	8 (Note: "Plus grandir" (live mix) originally peaked at number thirty-five in 1990. In September 2018, it reached number eight on the sales chart due to the reissued vinyl single.)		—		—	—	—	—	—			En concert
1991	"Désenchantée"	1		18		7	46	19	9	23		FRA: Gold; Export: Platinum	L'autre...
1991	"Regrets" (with Jean-Louis Murat)	3		—		19	—	—	—	—		FRA: Silver	L'autre...
1991	"Je t'aime mélancolie"	3		—		18	70	—	11	—			L'autre...
1992	"Beyond My Control"	3 (Note: "Beyond My Control" originally peaked at number eight in 1992. In June 2018, it reached number three on the sales chart due to the reissued vinyl single.)		—		51	—	—	32	—			L'autre...
1992	"Que mon cœur lâche" / "My Soul Is Slashed"	7 (Note: "Que mon cœur lâche" originally peaked at number nine in 1993. In September 2018, it reached number seven on the sales chart due to the reissued vinyl single.)		—		40	—	—	16	—			Dance Remixes
1995	"XXL"	1		—	3	11	—	—	10	11			Anamorphosée
1995	"L'Instant X"	6		—	12	26	—	—	20	—			Anamorphosée
1996	"California"	6 (Note: "California" originally peaked at number seven in 1996. In June 2018, it reached number five on the sales chart due to the reissued vinyl single.)		—	22	35	—	—	7	—			Anamorphosée
1996	"Comme j'ai mal"	2 (Note: "Comme j'ai mal" originally peaked at number eleven in 1996. In November 2018, it reached number two on the sales chart due to the reissued vinyl single.)		—	21	46	—	—	18	—			Anamorphosée
1996	"Rêver"	7		—	12	37	—	—	—	—			Anamorphosée
1997	"La Poupée qui fait non" (live) (with Khaled)	6		—	5	34	—	—	45	—			Live à Bercy
1997	"Ainsi soit je..." (live)	27		—	22	90	—	—	—	—			Live à Bercy
1999	"L'Âme-stram-gram"	2		—	9	14	—	—	—	—		FRA: Silver	Innamoramento
1999	"Je te rends ton amour"	10		—	18	43	—	—	—	—			Innamoramento
1999	"Souviens-toi du jour"	4		—	18	20	—	—	—	—		FRA: Silver	Innamoramento
2000	"Optimistique-moi"	7		—	15	30	—	—	—	58		FRA: Silver	Innamoramento
2000	"Innamoramento"	3		—	24	17	—	—	—	56			Innamoramento
2000	"Dessine-moi un mouton" (live)	6		—	11	30	—	—	—	59			Mylenium Tour
2001	"L'Histoire d'une fée, c'est..."	9		—	10	40	—	—	—	—			Rugrats in Paris
2001	"Les mots" (with Seal)	2		—	2	8	—	—	39	—		BEL: Gold; FRA: Gold	Les Mots
2002	"C'est une belle journée"	5		—	11	22	—	—	—	—		FRA: Gold	Les Mots
2002	"Pardonne-moi"	6		—	7	21	—	—	—	45			Les Mots
2005	"Fuck Them All"	2		— (Note: "Fuck Them All" did not enter the Ultratop 50 Singles Chart in Belgium Flanders, but peaked at number 17 on the Ultratip Chart.)	2	6	—	—	—	14		FRA: Silver	Avant que l'ombre...
2005	"Q.I"	7		—	4	24	—	—	—	33			Avant que l'ombre...
2006	"Redonne-moi"	7		—	6	29	—	—	—	27			Avant que l'ombre...
2006	"L'amour n'est rien..."	7		—	9	25	—	—	—	47			Avant que l'ombre...
2006	"Peut-être toi"	3		—	12	13	—	—	—	34			Avant que l'ombre...
2006	"Slipping Away (Crier la vie)" (with Moby)	1		—	1	8	—	—	—	18		FRA: Gold	Go – The Very Best of Moby
2006	"Avant que l'ombre..." (live)	10		—	25	38	—	—	—	54			Avant que l'ombre... à Bercy
2007	"Déshabillez-moi" (live)	10		—	19	33	—	—	—	81			Avant que l'ombre... à Bercy
2008	"Dégénération"	1		—	1	6	—	—	—	26			Point de suture
2008	"Appelle mon numéro"	1		—	7	13	—	—	—	53			Point de suture
2009	"Si j'avais au moins..."	1		—	25	6	—	—	—	72			Point de suture
2009	"C'est dans l'air"	1		—	13	7	—	—	—	44			Point de suture
2009	"Sextonik"	1		—	25	7	—	—	—	77			Point de suture
2010	"Oui mais... non"	1		—	2		—	—	43	52	12		Bleu Noir
2011	"Bleu Noir"	1		—	16		—	—	—	—	—		Bleu Noir
2011	"Lonely Lisa"	1		—	10		—	—	—	—	—		Bleu Noir
2011	"Du temps"	4		—	9		—	—	—	73	—		2001.2011
2012	"À l'ombre"	1		— (Note: "À l'ombre" did not enter the Ultratop 50 Singles Chart in Belgium Flanders, but peaked at number 75 on the Ultratip Chart.)	2		—	—	—	—	—		Monkey Me
2013	"Je te dis tout"	3		—	28		—	—	—	—	—		Monkey Me
2013	"Monkey Me"	3		—	43		—	—	—	—	—		Monkey Me
2015	"Stolen Car" (with Sting)	1		—	1		—	—		55	4		Interstellaires
2016	"City of Love"	1		—	— (Note: "City of Love" did not enter the Ultratop singles chart in Wallonia, but peaked at number 38 on the Ultratip chart.)		—	—		—	—		Interstellaires
2018	"Rolling Stone"	1	73	—	— (Note: "Rolling Stone" did not enter the Ultratop singles chart in Wallonia, but peaked at number 13 on the Ultratip chart.)		—	—		—	8		Désobéissance
2018	"N'oublie pas" (with LP)	1	83	—	— (Note: "N'oublie pas" did not enter the Ultratop singles chart in Wallonia, but peaked at number 17 on the Ultratip chart.)		—	—		—	5		Désobéissance
2018	"Désobéissance"	1	16	—	—		—	—		—	—		Désobéissance
2019	"Des larmes"	1	60	—	—		—	—		—	—		Désobéissance
2020	"L'âme dans l'eau"	1	68	—	—		—	—		—	2		Histoires de
2022	"À tout jamais"	1	10	—	18		—	—		—	—		L'Emprise
2022	"Rayon vert" (with AaRON)	1	45	—	4		—	—		—	—		L'Emprise
2023	"Rallumer les étoiles"	1	36	—	—		—	—		—	—		L'Emprise
2023	"L'emprise"	1	46	—	—		—	—		—	—		L'Emprise
2025	"Confession"	1	72	—	—		—	—		—	—		Égrégore
2026	"C'est à qui le tour"	—	20	—	21		—	—		—	—		Égrégore
2026	"Des lois et des quoi"		155										Égrégore
"—" denotes a title that did not chart, or was not released in that territory

=== Promotional singles and other charted songs ===
Year	Title	Peak chart positions			Album
Year	Title	FRA (Sales)	BEL (WA)	QB	Album
1986	"We'll Never Die"	—	—	37	Cendres de lune
2009	"C'est dans l'air" (live)	—	—	—	N°5 on Tour
2010	"Paradis inanimé" (live)	—	—	—	N°5 on Tour
2010	"Never Tear Us Apart" (INXS featuring Ben Harper and Mylène Farmer)	—	41	—	Original Sin
2011	"Sois moi – Be Me"	57	—	—	2001.2011
2012	"Elle a dit"	182	—	—	Monkey Me
2013	"Diabolique mon ange" (live)	—	—	—	Timeless 2013
2015	"Insondables"	23	22	—	Interstellaires
2015	"Interstellaires"	138	—	—	Interstellaires
2015	"C'est pas moi"	183	— (Note: "C'est pas moi" did not enter the Ultratop singles chart in Wallonia, but peaked at number 46 on the Ultratip chart.)	—	Interstellaires
2018	"Sentimentale"	19	—	—	Désobéissance
2018	"Parler d'avenir"	187	—	—	Désobéissance
2018	"Untitled"	17	—	—	Désobéissance (Deluxe Edition)
2018	"Histoires de fesses"	20	—	—	Désobéissance (Deluxe Edition)
2019	"M'effondre" (live)	17	—	—	Live 2019
2025	"Confenssion"	72	—	—	Festival de Cannes 2025'
"—" denotes a recording that did not chart or was not released in that territory.

== Home videos ==
Title	Video details	Peak chart positions					Certifications
Title	Video details	FRA	BEL (FL)	BEL (WA)	NLD	SWI	Certifications
Les Clips	Released: November 1987; Format: VHS	—	—	—	—	—	
Les Clips Vol. II	Released: December 1988; Format: VHS	—	—	—	—	—	
Les Clips Vol. III	Released: March 1990; Format: VHS	—	—	—	—	—	
The Videos	Released: March 1990; Format: VHS	—	—	—	—	—	
En concert	Released: May 1990, May 2019; Format: VHS, DVD	1	—	1	—	1	FRA: 2× Platinum
L'autre	Released: September 1992; Format: VHS	—	—	—	—	—	
Music Videos I	Released: April 1997; Format: VHS, DVD	8	—	—	—	6	FRA: Diamond
Music Videos II	Released: April 1997; Format: VHS	2	—	—	—	—	
Live à Bercy	Released: May 1997; Format: VHS, DVD	5	—	—	—	7	FRA: Diamond
Music Videos III	Released: November 2000; Format: VHS	—	—	—	—	—	
Mylenium Tour	Released: December 2000; Format: VHS, DVD	1	—	2	—	—	FRA: Diamond; BEL: Gold
Music Videos II & III	Released: March 2001; Format: DVD	4	—	—	—	8	FRA: Diamond
Music Videos I, II & III	Released: November 2001; Format: DVD	4	—	—	—	—	
Music Videos IV	Released: October 2006; Format: DVD	1	—	4	—	82 (Note: Music Videos IV charted on the Albums Chart in Switzerland.)	
Avant que l'ombre... à Bercy	Released: 4 December 2006; Format: DVD	1	—	1	—	5	FRA: Diamond
Stade de France	Released: 12 April 2010; Format: DVD, blu-ray	1	3	1	22	1	FRA: Diamond; BEL: Gold
Timeless 2013: Le Film	Released: 16 May 2014; Format: DVD, blu-ray	1	1	1	8	1	FRA: 3× Diamond
Live 2019: Le Film	Released: 6 December 2019; Format: DVD, Blu-ray, 4K	1	1	1	—	2	FRA: Diamond
Les Clips, l'intégrale 1999-2020	Released: June 2021; Format: DVD, Blu-ray	1	—	—	—	—	
Nevermore: Le Film	Released: 29 November 2024; Format: DVD, Blu-ray, 4K	1	—	—	—	—	FRA: Diamond
"—" denotes a recording that did not chart or was not released in that territory.
