= Histoires de =

Greatest hits album by Mylène Farmer
- Released: 4 December 2020
- Recorded: 1997–2020
- Length: 230:10
- Label: Stuffed Monkey
- Producer: Mylène Farmer; The Avener; Laurent Boutonnat; Mike Del Rio; Feder; Martin Kierszenbaum; Kimotion; Moby; RedOne

Mylène Farmer chronology
| Live 2019 (2019) | Histoires de (2020) | Plus grandir (2021) |

Singles from Histoires de
- 1. "L'âme dans l'eau" Released: 18 September 2020

Histoires de is a greatest hits album by French singer Mylène Farmer, released on 4 December 2020. It is her third compilation, after Les Mots (2001) and 2001.2011 (2011).

== Composition ==
Composed of 52 tracks, this compilation retraces Farmer's career up to that point and includes a previously unreleased song, "L'Âme dans l'eau", released two months earlier.

Songs from the albums Cendres de lune, Ainsi soit je..., L'Autre... and Anamorphosée are offered in their Live versions on disc 1; this is likely due to the fact that the singer's former label, Universal Music, holding the rights to her material released between 1986 and 1997.

There are two songs that were not released during this time period which are also only available in a Live version: Mad World, a cover of Tears for Fears in a duet with Gary Jules, and Diabolique mon ange, the original version of which was on the album Bleu noir (2010).

On discs 2 and 3, songs released after 1999 (starting with singles from the album Innamoramento) are offered in their original version, with the exception of Dégénération and C'est dans l'air (both from Point de suture) which are offered in their single edits (shortened versions compared to the originals).

Some singles are absent, either because they did not have a Live version released after 1999, or by a deliberate choice, since the singer wanted to balance the number of songs from each album, which explains the presence on the last disc of certain songs that were not released as singles, such as À force de... (from Monkey Me), Interstellaires, Un jour ou l'autre (both from Interstellaires) and Histoires de fesses (from Désobéissance).

== Commercial performance ==
In France, the compilation was certified Gold within ten days for more than 50,000 copies sold. It was later certified Platinum two months later, having sold more than 100,000 copies.

== Track listing ==
All lyrics are written by Mylène Farmer except where noted; all music is composed by Laurent Boutonnat except where noted.

Disc one
| No. | Title | Writer(s) | Original album | Length |
|---|---|---|---|---|
| 1. | "Libertine" | Laurent Boutonnat; Jean-Claude Déquéant | N°5 on Tour | 5:36 |
| 2. | "Sans logique" | | Live 2019 | 3:49 |
| 3. | "Sans contrefaçon" | | N°5 on Tour | 4:10 |
| 4. | "Ainsi soit je..." | | N°5 on Tour | 4:19 |
| 5. | "Pourvu qu'elles soient douces" | | Live 2019 | 5:23 |
| 6. | "Je t'aime mélancolie" | | Timeless 2013 | 5:01 |
| 7. | "Regrets" | | Mylenium Tour | 5:06 |
| 8. | "Désenchantée" | | Timeless 2013 | 6:19 |
| 9. | "Beyond My Control" | | Mylenium Tour | 4:56 |
| 10. | "XXL" | | Avant que l'ombre... à Bercy | 4:49 |
| 11. | "California" | | Avant que l'ombre... à Bercy | 5:22 |
| 12. | "Rêver" | | N°5 on Tour | 5:22 |
| 13. | "Comme j'ai mal" | | Timeless 2013 | 3:48 |
| 14. | "L'Instant X" | | Stade de France | 4:53 |
| 15. | "Mad World" (featuring Gary Jules) | Roland Orzabal | Timeless 2013 | 3:25 |
| 16. | "Diabolique mon ange" | Farmer; Darius Keeler | Timeless 2013 | 5:12 |
| Total length: | | | | 75:30 |

Disc two
| No. | Title | Writer(s) | Original album | Length |
|---|---|---|---|---|
| 1. | "Innamoramento" | | Innamoramento | 5:24 |
| 2. | "L'Âme-stram-gram" | | Innamoramento | 4:23 |
| 3. | "Souviens-toi du jour" | | Innamoramento | 4:58 |
| 4. | "Optimistique-moi" | Farmer | Innamoramento | 4:20 |
| 5. | "Je te rends ton amour" | | Innamoramento | 5:10 |
| 6. | "C'est une belle journée" | | Les Mots | 4:16 |
| 7. | "Les Mots" (featuring Seal) | | Les Mots | 4:49 |
| 8. | "Fuck Them All" | | Avant que l'ombre... | 4:35 |
| 9. | "L'amour n'est rien..." | | Avant que l'ombre... | 5:06 |
| 10. | "Avant que l'ombre..." | | Avant que l'ombre... | 5:57 |
| 11. | "Q.I" | | Avant que l'ombre... | 5:24 |
| 12. | "Redonne-moi" | | Avant que l'ombre... | 4:25 |
| 13. | "Dégénération" (Radio Edit) | | Point de suture | 4:06 |
| 14. | "C'est dans l'air" (Radio Edit) | | Point de suture | 3:37 |
| 15. | "Appelle mon numéro" | | Point de suture | 5:30 |
| 16. | "Si j'avais au moins..." | | Point de suture | 5:30 |
| Total length: | | | | 77:30 |

Disc three
| No. | Title | Writer(s) | Producer(s) | Length |
|---|---|---|---|---|
| 1. | "Oui mais... non" | Farmer; RedOne; Jimmy Joker | Bleu noir | 4:20 |
| 2. | "Bleu Noir" | Farmer; Moby | Bleu noir | 4:04 |
| 3. | "M'effondre" | Farmer; Moby | Bleu noir | 3:33 |
| 4. | "Lonely Lisa" | Farmer; RedOne; Joker | Bleu noir | 3:02 |
| 5. | "Du temps" | | 2001.2011 | 3:37 |
| 6. | "À force de..." | | Monkey Me | 4:06 |
| 7. | "Monkey Me" | | Monkey Me | 4:11 |
| 8. | "À l'ombre" | | Monkey Me | 4:48 |
| 9. | "Je te dis tout" | | Monkey Me | 5:30 |
| 10. | "Interstellaires" | Farmer; Martin Kierszenbaum | Interstellaires | 3:11 |
| 11. | "Stolen Car" (featuring Sting) | Farmer; Sting | Interstellaires | 3:22 |
| 12. | "City of Love" | Farmer; Kierszenbaum; Matthew Koma | Interstellaires | 4:27 |
| 13. | "Un jour ou l'autre" | Farmer; Kierszenbaum | Interstellaires | 4:27 |
| 14. | "Rolling Stone" | Farmer; Feder; Johanna Iser; Peter Hoppe; Anastassia Zimmerman; Ashley Hicklin; Kimberley Sawford; Quentin Segaud | Désobéissance | 3:45 |
| 15. | "N'oublie pas" (featuring LP) | Farmer; LP; Nate Campany; Mike Del Rio | Désobéissance | 3:40 |
| 16. | "Désobéissance" | Farmer; Leon Deutschmann | Désobéissance | 3:59 |
| 17. | "Sentimentale" | Farmer; Feder; Segaud | Désobéissance | 4:16 |
| 18. | "Des larmes" | Farmer; Del Rio; LP | Désobéissance | 3:48 |
| 19. | "Histoires de fesses" | Farmer; Feder | Désobéissance | 1:57 |
| 20. | "L'âme dans l'eau" | Farmer; Jonathan Burr; Adam Richardson | Previously unreleased | 3:07 |
| Total length: | | | | 77:10 |

== Charts ==
=== Weekly charts ===
Weekly chart performance for Histoires de
| Chart (2020) | Peak position |
|---|---|
| Belgian Albums (Ultratop Wallonia) | 2 |
| French Albums (SNEP) | 2 |
| Swiss Albums (Schweizer Hitparade) | 5 |

=== Year-end charts ===
2020 year-end chart performance for Histoires de
| Chart (2020) | Position |
|---|---|
| Belgian Albums (Ultratop Wallonia) | 99 |
| French Albums (SNEP) | 43 |

2021 year-end chart performance for Histoires de
| Chart (2021) | Position |
|---|---|
| Belgian Albums (Ultratop Wallonia) | 58 |
| French Albums (SNEP) | 97 |

== Certifications ==
Certifications for Histoires de
| Region | Certification | Certified units/sales |
|---|---|---|
| France (SNEP) | Platinum | 100,000^{‡} |
^{‡} Sales+streaming figures based on certification alone.
