= 2001.2011 =

Greatest hits album by Mylène Farmer
- Released: 5 December 2011
- Genre: Pop, dance-pop, pop rock, electropop
- Label: Polydor
- Producer: Laurent Boutonnat

Mylène Farmer chronology
Bleu noir (2010)	2001.2011 (2011)	Monkey Me (2012)

Singles from 2001.2011
- 1. "Du temps" Released: 7 November 2011

2001.2011 is an album by French singer Mylène Farmer. It was her second compilation, after Les Mots in 2001, and was released on 5 December 2011. It contains all the singles from her last three studio albums and two new songs. One of them was the lead single from 2001.2011, "Du temps", released digitally on 7 November.

== Background ==
On 3 November 2011, an article in the French newspaper France Soir confirmed rumors about an upcoming best of by Farmer, said it would be released on 5 December and showed the cover. The next day, Polydor officially announced the best of, saying: "After the Bleu noir album, certified diamond, Mylène Farmer presents 2001.2011, a selection of her greatest hits during that period. This album follows her first best of Les Mots, sold over 1.5 million. It will also contain two new tracks including new single". On 10 November, the track listing was revealed on the Internet: composed of 17 tracks, it includes all of Farmer's previous singles from her last three studio albums, one live single and two new songs.

Unlike Farmer's previous albums, the cover does not display a photo, but an abstract painting representing half of the singer's face, semi hidden behind a lock of red hair, drawing that Thierry de Cabarrus of Suite101 site considers as being "enigmatic, even melancholy".

== Commercial performance ==
In France, the album debuted at number three, selling 40,455 units. In Switzerland, it began at number 36, and it reached the 8 position in the French-speaking part of Switzerland (Romandie). In Belgium (Wallonia), the album entered at number ten on the chart edition of 17 December 2011.

== Track listings ==
=== CD ===
All lyrics are written by Mylène Farmer except where noted; all music is composed by Laurent Boutonnat except where noted.

No.	Title	Lyrics	Music	Original album	Length
1.	"Du temps"	Mylène Farmer	Laurent Boutonnat	Previously unreleased	3:37
2.	"Avant que l'ombre..."			Avant que l'ombre...	6:01
3.	"Fuck Them All"			Avant que l'ombre...	4:34
4.	"L'amour n'est rien..."		Laurent Boutonnat; Mylène Farmer	Avant que l'ombre...	5:03
5.	"Peut-être toi"			Avant que l'ombre...	4:47
6.	"Q.I"			Avant que l'ombre...	5:19
7.	"Redonne-moi"			Avant que l'ombre...	4:23
8.	"Crier La Vie (Slipping Away)" (duet with Moby)	Farmer; Moby	Moby	Go	3:40
9.	"Dégénération" (Radio edit)			Point de suture	4:05
10.	"Appelle mon numéro"			Point de suture	5:29
11.	"C'est dans l'air"			Point de suture	4:29
12.	"Sextonik"			Point de suture	4:32
13.	"Si j'avais au moins..."			Point de suture	5:32
14.	"Oui mais... non"		RedOne; Jimmy Joker	Bleu noir	4:20
15.	"Bleu noir"		Moby	Bleu noir	4:04
16.	"Lonely Lisa"		RedOne; Joker	Bleu noir	2:59
17.	"Sois moi – Be Me"			Previously unreleased	3:59

=== Collector box ===
CD 1
No.	Title	Lyrics	Music	Original album	Length
1.	"Maman a tort"	Jérôme Dahan	Laurent Boutonnat; Jérôme Dahan	Cendres de lune	6:00
2.	"Plus grandir"			Cendres de lune	3:39
3.	"Libertine"	Boutonnat	Jean-Claude Déquéant	Cendres de lune	3:33
4.	"Tristana"			Cendres de lune	4:34
5.	"Sans contrefaçon"			Ainsi soit je...	4:18
6.	"Ainsi soit je..."			Ainsi soit je...	4:48
7.	"Pourvu qu'elles soient douces"			Ainsi soit je...	4:16
8.	"Sans logique"			Ainsi soit je...	4:02
9.	"Ainsi soit je..."			En concert	4:40
10.	"La Veuve noire"			À quoi je sers... (single)	4:19
11.	"Désenchantée"			L'autre...	5:05
12.	"Regrets" (duet with Jean-Louis Murat)			L'autre...	5:04
13.	"Je t'aime mélancolie"			L'autre...	4:43
14.	"Beyond My Control"			L'autre...	5:21
15.	"Que mon cœur lâche"			Dance Remixes	4:05

CD 2
No.	Title	Music	Original album	Length
1.	"Les Mots" (duet with Seal)		Les Mots	4:48
2.	"California"		Anamorphosée	4:59
3.	"XXL"		Anamorphosée	4:26
4.	"L'Instant X"		Anamorphosée	4:42
5.	"Comme j'ai mal"		Anamorphosée	3:52
6.	"Rêver"		Anamorphosée	5:22
7.	"C'est une belle journée"		Les Mots	4:16
8.	"L'Âme-Stram-Gram"		Innamoramento	4:23
9.	"Je te rends ton amour"		Innamoramento	5:05
10.	"Effets secondaires"		Je te rends ton amour (single)	3:51
11.	"Souviens-toi du jour"		Innamoramento	4:59
12.	"Optimistique-moi"	Farmer	Innamoramento	4:21
13.	"Innamoramento"		Innamoramento	5:11
14.	"L'Histoire d'une fée, c'est..."		Rugrats in Paris	5:03
15.	"Pardonne-moi"		Les Mots	4:29

No.	Title	Lyrics	Music	Original album	Length
1.	"Du temps"	Mylène Farmer	Laurent Boutonnat	Previously unreleased	3:37
2.	"Avant que l'ombre..."			Avant que l'ombre...	6:01
3.	"Fuck Them All"			Avant que l'ombre...	4:34
4.	"L'amour n'est rien..."		Laurent Boutonnat; Mylène Farmer	Avant que l'ombre...	5:03
5.	"Peut-être toi"			Avant que l'ombre...	4:47
6.	"Q.I"			Avant que l'ombre...	5:19
7.	"Redonne-moi"			Avant que l'ombre...	4:23
8.	"Crier La Vie (Slipping Away)" (duet with Moby)	Farmer; Moby	Moby	Go	3:40
9.	"Dégénération" (Radio edit)			Point de suture	4:05
10.	"Appelle mon numéro"			Point de suture	5:29
11.	"C'est dans l'air"			Point de suture	4:29
12.	"Sextonik"			Point de suture	4:32
13.	"Si j'avais au moins..."			Point de suture	5:32
14.	"Oui mais... non"		RedOne; Jimmy Joker	Bleu noir	4:20
15.	"Bleu noir"		Moby	Bleu noir	4:04
16.	"Lonely Lisa"		RedOne; Joker	Bleu noir	2:59
17.	"Sois moi – Be Me"			Previously unreleased	3:59

== Charts ==
=== Weekly charts ===
Chart (2011)	Peak position
Belgian Albums (Ultratop Wallonia)	10
French Albums (SNEP)	3
French Compilations (SNEP)	1
Swiss Albums (Schweizer Hitparade)	36
Swiss Albums (Schweizer Hitparade Romandy)	8
Russian Albums (M2	48

=== Year-end charts ===
Chart (2011)	Position
French Compilations (SNEP)	3
Chart (2012)	Position
Belgian Albums (Ultratop Wallonia)	81
French Compilations (SNEP)	32

== Certifications and sales ==
Region	Certification	Certified units/sales
Belgium (BRMA)	Gold	15,000^{*}
France (SNEP)	2× Platinum	200,000^{*}
^{*} Sales figures based on certification alone.

== Formats ==
- CD digipack 2001.2011 (17 tracks)
- LP 2001.2011 (17 tracks)
- Collector box 3 CD Best of (47 tracks)

== Release history ==
Region	Date	Format
Belgium, France, Switzerland	5 December 2011	CD digipack, triple CD digipack, double vinyl
