= Music Videos IV =

Video by Mylène Farmer
- Released: October 2006
- Recorded: 2001–2006
- Genre: Compilation
- Label: Polydor

Mylène Farmer chronology
Music Videos I, II & III (2001)	Music Videos IV (2006)	Avant que l'ombre... à Bercy (2006)

Music Videos IV is a DVD recorded by the French singer Mylène Farmer, containing all the singer's videoclips from 2001 to 2006. It was released in October 2006 in France.

This DVD includes the videos of the three singles from the best of Les Mots and those of the five singles from the sixth studio album Avant que l'ombre.... The cover uses an image from the single's video "Les Mots".

== Formats ==
This video is available only on DVD.

== Chart performance ==
In France, the DVD went straight to number one on 4 November 2006, with 10,883 sales, its best weekly sales. It stayed for 5 weeks in the Top 10 and 29 weeks on Top 40. It disappeared from the chart 16 June 2007. With a total of 39,575 sales in 2006, the DVD peaked at number 11 on the Annual Videos Chart.

== Track listings ==
No	Video	From album	Year
1	"Les Mots" (duet with Seal)	Les Mots	2001
2	"Pardonne-moi"	Les Mots	2001
3	"C'est une belle journée"	Les Mots	2001
4	"Fuck Them All"	Avant que l'ombre...	2005
5	"Q.I"	Avant que l'ombre...	2005
6	"Redonne-moi"	Avant que l'ombre...	2006
7	"L'amour n'est rien..."	Avant que l'ombre...	2006
8	"Peut-être toi"	Avant que l'ombre...	2006

Bonus: Shoot It All (making-of "Fuck Them All")

== Credits and personnel ==
- "Les Mots", "Pardonne-moi", "Fuck Them All": Produced by Laurent Boutonnat
- "C'est une belle journée", "L'amour n'est rien...": Produced by Benoît Di Sabatino
- "Q.I": Produced by Benoît Lestang
- "Redonne-moi": Produced by François Hanss
- "Peut-être toi": Produced by Kusumi Naoko

== Charts ==
Chart (2006)	Peak position
Belgian (Wallonia) Musical DVD Chart	4
French SNEP Musical DVD Chart	1
Swiss Musical DVD Chart	82

End of year chart (2006)	Position
Belgian (Wallonia) Musical DVD Chart	26
French Musical DVD Chart	11
End of year chart (2007)	Position
Belgian (Wallonia) Musical DVD Chart	50
