= Sois moi – Be Me =

Song by Mylène Farmer

from the album 2001.2011
- Released: 5 December 2011
- Recorded: 2011
- Genre: Electropop
- Length: 4:00
- Label: Polydor
- Composer: Laurent Boutonnat
- Lyricist: Mylène Farmer
- Producer: Laurent Boutonnat

"Sois moi - Be Me" is a 2011 song of French-Canadian singer and songwriter Mylène Farmer, with music by Laurent Boutonnat. It was published on her second best-of 2001.2011, issued on 5 December 2011. Alongside "Du temps", "Sois moi – Be Me" was one of the two then unreleased songs from the album. The song poorly charted in France, peaking at number 57, and generally received negative reviews from both critics and Farmer's fans.

== Release, lyrics and music ==
On 30 November 2011, six days before the compilation album's release, the song leaked on one of the singer's fan site.

"Sois moi – Be Me" is an uptempo electropop song, with two verses dealing with the themes of madness, sexuality and melancholy, and a chorus only composed of the words 'Be me oh-oh!'. Before the second verse, Farmer can be heard moaning in a sexual manner.

== Reception ==
Many reviews were unfavourable and noted the similarity of "Sois moi – Be Me" with Britney Spears' 2007 single "Gimme More". According to evous.fr site, "this pop-dance-oriented song seems to annoy many fans. Their comments published on YouTube suggest a certain disappointment". A poll on the Mylene.net site, in order to know the opinion of Farmer's fans about the song, indicated that 22.8% of the voters answered "I hate", which was the highest percentage out of the five answers.

News de Stars said: "From the first notes, we are surprised by the tone of this new resolutely electro, very rhythmic and very fast track. (...) "Really, we seem to have heard [the chorus] somewhere... And indeed, the "be me" played repeatedly by Mylène Farmer give the feeling to hear... "Gimme More" by Britney Spears!" French magazine Têtu considered the song very different from "Du temps" and that it "immediately recalls Britney Spears' sexual hit "Gimme More". To journalist Benoît Cachin, the music of the song is " swinging" and the lyrics are "poor". Although he considers that there is nothing special in this song, he believes that it is "first designed for dance floors, where lyrics do not matter".

On his blog, French author and journalist Hugues Royer, who wrote a book on Farmer in 2008, stated: "I think this is the first time I do not really adhere to a song of Mylène (...). I did not detect either the usual fluidity of Boutonnat's melodies or that singular thing in the lyrics that makes Mylène a special artist". However, he thought that the song could be effective on radio.

Much more critical, the writing committee of Pop Heart said to be "hilarious" after listening to the song, adding: "Our champion of the day has managed the feat to propose a track that Ysa Ferrer herself would not dare record. Everything looks like a parody: cheap music, lyrics that are not renewed". The song was deemed an "auditory attack". When Farmer's next studio album Monkey Me was released in December 2012, Julien Dejardin of ptitblog.net considered the song "Love Dance" as being worse than "Sois moi – Be Me".

Although it has not been released as a single, "Sois moi – Be Me" charted in France due to downloads on the week of the album's release. It debuted at a peak of number 57 on the chart edition of 10 December 2011.

== Formats ==
These are the formats of "Sois moi - Be Me":

- Digital download

No.	Title	Length
1.	"Sois moi – Be Me" (album version)	4:00

== Credits ==
- Mylène Farmer – lyrics
- Laurent Boutonnat – music, programming, keyboards and arrangements
- Jérôme Devoise – mixing at Studio Calliphora

== Charts ==
Chart (2011)	Peak position
French SNEP Singles Chart	57
