= Avant que l'ombre... à Bercy (residency) =

2006 concert tour by Mylène Farmer

- Residency by Mylène Farmer
- Location: Paris, France
- Venue: Palais omnisports de Paris-Bercy
- Associated album: Avant que l'ombre...
- Start date: 13 January 2006
- End date: 29 January 2006
- No. of shows: 13

Mylène Farmer concert chronology
- Mylenium Tour (2000); Avant que l'ombre... à Bercy (2006); Mylène Farmer en tournée (2009)

Avant que l'ombre... à Bercy was a 2006 concert residency by French singer Mylène Farmer in support of her sixth studio album, Avant que l'ombre.... It was the fourth concert series of the singer. Unlike her previous tours, all 13 concerts took place at Palais Omnisports de Bercy in Paris; "Avant que l'ombre" can therefore be considered as a concert residency rather than a fully fledged tour.

More than 169,000 tickets were sold about a year before the concerts.

== Set list ==
Act I

1. Ouverture
2. "Peut-être toi"
3. "XXL"
4. "Dans les rues de Londres"
5. "California"
6. "Porno graphique" + Outro

Act II

7. "Sans contrefaçon"
8. "Q.I"
9. "C'est une belle journée" + Outro

Act III

10. "Ange, parle-moi..."
11. "Redonne-moi"
12. "Rêver"
13. "L'Autre" (Replaced by Ainsi-soit je... on the first 2 dates and 21 January)
14. "Désenchantée"
15. "Nobody Knows" + Outro

Act IV

16. "Je t'aime mélancolie"
17. "L'amour n'est rien..."
18. "Déshabillez-moi"
19. "Les Mots" (duet with Abraham Laboriel Jr.)
20. "Fuck Them All"

Final

21. "Avant que l'ombre..."

== Shows ==
There were a total of 13 shows, from 13 to 29 January 2006.

Date	City	Country	Venue
13 January 2006	Paris	France	Palais omnisports de Paris-Bercy
14 January 2006	Paris	France	Palais omnisports de Paris-Bercy
15 January 2006	Paris	France	Palais omnisports de Paris-Bercy
17 January 2006	Paris	France	Palais omnisports de Paris-Bercy
18 January 2006	Paris	France	Palais omnisports de Paris-Bercy
20 January 2006	Paris	France	Palais omnisports de Paris-Bercy
21 January 2006	Paris	France	Palais omnisports de Paris-Bercy
22 January 2006	Paris	France	Palais omnisports de Paris-Bercy
24 January 2006	Paris	France	Palais omnisports de Paris-Bercy
25 January 2006	Paris	France	Palais omnisports de Paris-Bercy
27 January 2006	Paris	France	Palais omnisports de Paris-Bercy
28 January 2006	Paris	France	Palais omnisports de Paris-Bercy
29 January 2006	Paris	France	Palais omnisports de Paris-Bercy

== Credits and personnel ==
- Production: Thierry Suc
- Editions: Paul Van Parys for Requiem Publishing
- Design entertainment: Laurent Boutonnat and Mylène Farmer
- Set designer: Mark Fisher (Stufish Co)
- Costumes designed by: Franck Sorbier
- Make-up: Carole Lasnier
- Hair: John Nollet
- Lighting design: Fred Peveri
- Sound: Stéphane Plisson for MAW Society
- Images: Alain Escalle
- Production images: Cheval de Troie
- Musical director: Yvan Cassar
- Vocal coaching: Malcom Walker
- Management: Thierry Suc with de Thomas Blanc
- Musicians: Yvan Cassar, Eric Chevalier (keyboards), Peredur ap Gwynedd (guitar), Milton McDonald (guitar), Paul Bushnell (bass), Nicolas Montazaud (percussions), Abraham Laboriel Jr. (drum kit)
- Choristers: Esther Dobong'Na Essienne, Johanna Manchec
- Choreographies: Mylène Farmer
  Except : "C'est une belle journée": Mylène Farmer and Christophe Danchaud; "Fuck Them All": Mylène Farmer and Los Vivancos.
- Dancers: Ayo Berner Jackson, Christine Dejesus, Khetanya Jati Henderson, Tiffany Howard, Sharaya Howell, Edara Johnson, Christianna Toler, Naimah Willoughby, Los Vivancos
- Photos: Claude Gassian
- First part of the show: The shortfilm "Le conte du monde flottant" by Alain Escalle
