= Avant que l'ombre... à Bercy =

Live album by Mylène Farmer
- Released: 4 December 2006
- Recorded: Paris
- Genre: Pop, rock
- Length: 1:59:55
- Label: Polydor
- Producer: Laurent Boutonnat

Mylène Farmer chronology
Avant que l'ombre... (2005)	Avant que l'ombre... à Bercy (2006)	Point de suture (2008)

Alternative cover
- Collector edition

Singles from Avant que l'ombre... à Bercy
- 1. "Avant que l'ombre..." Released: 26 November 2006; 2. "Déshabillez-moi" Released: 5 March 2007

Avant que l'ombre... à Bercy is the fourth live album by Mylène Farmer, released on 4 December 2006.

== Background ==
Six years after her Mylenium Tour, Mylène Farmer came back on stage with a tour in 2006 which included 13 shows at Bercy, in Paris. This very successful series of concerts started on 13 January and ended 16 days later, on 29 January. As after each of her tour, Farmer decided to launch a live album retracing her concert. Thus, Jérome Devoise mixed the 20 songs performed on stage and the album "Avant que l'ombre... à Bercy" was eventually released on 4 December 2006 as CDs and DVDs, under various editions.

The album contains songs from all Farmer's studio albums, except Cendres de Lune and Innamoramento. The production enjoys very high quality in terms of sound effects. Some of the old hits were re-orchestred in a much modern version, while the slow songs from the last studio album are recorded in a more stripped style.

The various formats, particularly the DVD box, had huge success: the video was certified Diamond after a single week of release.

The two singles from this album, "Avant que l'ombre..." and "Déshabillez-moi", achieved a minor success in term of sales, but were both top ten hits in France.

== Critical reception ==
Professional ratings
Review scores
Source	Rating
Dvdrama	9/10 stars
Dvd.fr	7.5/10 stars

This album was, on the whole, well received by media and contemporary pop music critics. Nicolas Gardon, in L'Echo Republicain, said that this album offers an "fair performance, but only a few surprises: the shimmering and coloured universe of Mylène Farmer is perfectly reproduced in this double CD. The release of this DVD was regarded as "the event of the week" by the magazine Télé Star.

Dvdrama qualifies the DVD as "sublime" video, specifying: "The image of this concert exceeds in all respects the nevertheless perfect image of the previous two already available concerts. The red and the black, the dominant colors, are staggering of beauty". On the other hand, it expressed some little criticisms on the quality of the sound.

== Commercial performance ==
In France, the DVD was sold to 98,000 copies in its first week of release — what constitutes a record. On the French Videos Chart, it debuted at number 1 for four consecutive weeks and stayed in the top ten for 13 weeks. It managed to remain in the top 40 until 17 November 2007. Certified diamond, this DVD was, only 15 days after its release, the second best-selling video of 2006, just behind the musical Le Roi Soleil.

The CD was sold to 41,034 copies in the week of its release, and, as for the DVD, it went straight to number 1 on the French Albums Chart on 9 December 2006. However, it dropped to #8 the following week, stayed only for eight weeks in the top 50 and left the chart (Top 200) after its 18th week. So the DVD was preferred by the buyers. The album was nevertheless the 57th best-selling album of 2006 and totaled approximately 130,000 copies sold. It was certified Gold disc by the SNEP.

In Belgium Wallonia, the CD entered the album chart at #9 on 16 December 2006, and reached its peak position, #3, the week after. However, it dropped quickly then and stabilized in the last positions. It left the chart (Top 40) on 6 April 2007, after 12 weeks of attendance.
The DVD started directly to number 1 and kept this position for eight consecutive weeks. It stayed in the top ten for a total of 32 weeks. So, in Belgium too, the DVD was more sold than the CD.

The live CD was also charted in Switzerland, but had a moderate success in this country. It went to #20 on 17 December 2006 and reached its peak position, #18, the following week. After that, it kept on dropping and left the Top 100 after its 11 week.

== Track listings ==
=== CD ===
Disc one
No.	Title	Lyrics	Music	Original album	Length
1.	"Introduction"	Mylène Farmer	Laurent Boutonnat	-	5:30
2.	"Peut-être toi"	Farmer	Boutonnat	Avant que l'ombre...	3:27
3.	"XXL"	Farmer	Boutonnat	Anamorphosée	5:27
4.	"Dans les rues de Londres"	Farmer	Boutonnat	Avant que l'ombre...	4:18
5.	"California"	Farmer	Boutonnat	Anamorphosée	5:19
6.	"Porno graphique"	Farmer	Boutonnat	Avant que l'ombre...	4:13
7.	"Sans contrefaçon"	Farmer	Boutonnat	Ainsi soit je...	4:46
8.	"QI"	Farmer	Boutonnat	Avant que l'ombre...	6:58
9.	"C'est une belle journée"	Farmer	Boutonnat	Les Mots	8:21
10.	"Ange, parle-moi"	Farmer	Boutonnat	Avant que l'ombre...	4:50
11.	"Redonne-moi"	Farmer	Boutonnat	Avant que l'ombre...	5:44

Disc two
No.	Title	Lyrics	Music	Original album	Length
1.	"Rêver"	Mylène Farmer	Laurent Boutonnat	Anamorphosée	7:42
2.	"L'autre..."	Farmer	Boutonnat	L'autre...	7:25
3.	"Désenchantée"	Farmer	Boutonnat	L'autre...	6:42
4.	"Nobody Knows"	Farmer	Boutonnat	Avant que l'ombre...	5:36
5.	"Je t'aime mélancolie"	Farmer	Boutonnat	L'autre...	5:43
6.	"L'amour n'est rien..."	Farmer	Boutonnat; Farmer	Avant que l'ombre...	5:05
7.	"Déshabillez-moi"	Gaby Verlor	Robert Nyel	Ainsi soit je...	4:12
8.	"Les Mots (duet with Abraham Laboriel Jr.)"	Farmer	Boutonnat	Les Mots	5:06
9.	"Fuck Them All"	Farmer	Boutonnat	Avant que l'ombre...	6:42
10.	"Avant que l'ombre..."	Farmer	Boutonnat	Avant que l'ombre...	7:26

=== DVD ===
1. Introduction (7:32)
2. "Peut-être toi" (3:22)
3. "XXL" (5:27)
4. "Dans les rues de Londres" (4:16)
5. "California" (5:15)
6. "Porno graphique" (4:07)
7. "Sans contrefaçon" (4:48)
8. "Q.I" (6:50)
9. "C'est une belle journée" (4:14)
10. "Ange, parle-moi" (4:32)
11. "Redonne-moi" (5:36)
12. "Rêver" (7:41)
13. "L'Autre" (7:25)
14. "Désenchantée" (9:08)
15. "Nobody Knows" (5:36)
16. "Je t'aime mélancolie" (4:47)
17. "L'amour n'est rien..." (4:59)
18. "Déshabillez-moi" (3:54)
19. "Les Mots" (5:05)
20. "Fuck Them All" (8:18)
21. "Avant que l'ombre..." (7:45)
22. Générique de fin (3:56)

The second DVD contains several bonuses ("L'Ombre des autres", "Scene by scene views", "Works by Escalle", "Haute Couture", "Live Alternative"), and a hidden bonus: "La Cassar mobile".

== Album charts ==
=== Weekly album charts ===
Weekly chart performance for Avant que l'ombre... à Bercy
Chart (2006)	Peak position
Belgian Albums (Ultratop Wallonia)	3
European Albums (Billboard)	14
French Albums (SNEP)	1
Swiss Albums (Schweizer Hitparade)	18
Swiss Albums (GfK Romandy)	40

=== Year-end album charts ===
2006 year-end chart performance for Avant que l'ombre... à Bercy
Chart (2006)	Position
Belgian Albums (Ultratop Wallonia)	90
French Albums (SNEP)	57

2007 year-end chart performance for Avant que l'ombre... à Bercy
Chart (2007)	Position
French Albums (SNEP)	180

== DVD charts ==
=== Weekly DVD charts ===
Chart (2006)	Peak position
Belgian DVDs (Ultratop Wallonia)	1
French DVDs (SNEP)	1
Chart (2010)	Peak position
Swiss Music DVD (Schweizer Hitparade)	5

=== Year-end DVD charts ===
Chart (2006)	Position
Belgian DVDs (Ultratop Wallonia)	4
French DVDs (SNEP)	2
Chart (2007)	Position
Belgian DVDs (Ultratop Wallonia)	6
French DVDs (SNEP)	15
Chart (2008)	Position
French DVDs (GfK)	43
Chart (2009)	Position
French DVDs (SNEP)	33
Chart (2010)	Position
French DVDs (SNEP)	32

== Certifications and sales ==
Region	Certification	Certified units/sales
France (SNEP) Album	Gold	75,000^{*}
France (SNEP) DVD	Diamond	500,000
^{*} Sales figures based on certification alone.

== Credits ==
- Text: Mylène Farmer

Except: "Déshabillez-moi": Robert Nyel

- Music: Laurent Boutonnat

Except: "L'amour n'est rien...": Mylène Farmer and Laurent Boutonnat; "Déshabillez-moi": Gaby Verlor

- Editions: Requiem Publishing

Except: "Sans contrefaçon": Universal Music Publishing / BMG Music Publishing France; "Déshabillez-moi": Intersong

- Record label: Polydor
- Production: Stuffed Monkey
- Recorded and mixed by Jérôme Devoise, with Tristan Monrocq, at Studio Guillaume Tell
- Executive production: Paul Van Parys
- Mastering: André Perriat, at Top Master
- Management: Thierry Suc
- Photography: Claude Gassian
- Design: Henry Neu / Com' N.B

For more details about credits and personnel, see: Avant que l'ombre... à Bercy (tour).

== Formats ==
Audio

- Double CD
- Double CD — Collector
- Quadruple 7"

Audio & Video

- Collector edition (2 CD + 2 DVD) – Limited edition (7,500)

Video

- Double DVD
- Double DVD — Collector
- Blu-ray (since September 2008)
