= Peut-être toi =

Single by Mylène Farmer

from the album Avant que l'ombre...
- B-side: Instrumental (CD single); Remixes (CD maxi)
- Released: 21 August 2006
- Recorded: 2005, France
- Genre: Dance-pop, house
- Length: 3:40 (single version); 3:45 (radio edit); 4:55 (album version)
- Label: Polydor
- Songwriters: Lyrics: Mylène Farmer; Music: Laurent Boutonnat
- Producer: Laurent Boutonnat

Mylène Farmer singles chronology
"L'amour n'est rien..." (2006)	"Peut-être toi" (2006)	"Slipping Away (Crier la vie)" (2006)

Alternative cover
- CD maxi

Peut-etre Toi
- Directed by: Naoko Kusumi
- Music by: Mylène Farmer
- Production company: Production I.G
- Release date: 15 July 2006
- Running time: 7 minutes
- Country: Japan

"Peut-être toi" (English: "Maybe You") is a 2005 song recorded by the French artist Mylène Farmer. It was the fifth single from her sixth studio album, Avant que l'ombre..., and was released on 21 August 2006. The music video was produced as an animated feature and the lyrics deals with a love relationship. It was a top three hit in France, but its sales were rather modest.

== Background and release ==
In May 2005, the fans were disappointed when "Q.I" was chosen as the second single, as "Peut-être toi" was already broadcast on radio and then seemed to be a next single. Later, as of 22 May 2006, a rumor announced "Dans les rues de Londres" as the fifth single from the album. However, on 16 June 2006, it was officially announced that "Peut-être toi" would be the fifth and last single from Avant que l'ombre....

The song was broadcast for the first time in its radio edit version on 19 June on NRJ. On 26 June, the first remix, called the Miss Farmer's remix, was presented but not played. On 6 July, both versions - the radio edit and the Miss Farmer's remix - were available on digital download websites. Twenty-one days later, the second remix - Cox's remix -, was officially announced. The single was eventually released on 21 August, in three limited editions: CD single, CD maxi et 12" vinyl. The first remix was produced by Bionix, who also produced one of them for "L'amour n'est rien...", and the two others were made by Chris Cox who also remixed "Désenchantée" and "Q.I".

"Peut-être toi" was performed during the 2006 Farmer's tour as the first song of the concert, and thus it is available on the live album Avant que l'ombre... à Bercy.

== Lyrics and music ==
The author Benoît Cachin said the song's lyrics are optimistic, which is very rare in Farmer's career. In the refrain, the singer explains to her lover that he should prevent her from speaking "if her dark universe exceeded her love". The song is punctuated with several "Shut up" sung by Farmer and has dance and electro sonorities. The psychologist Hugues Royer believes that in this song, "there is some caution in the declaration [of love], a decency to say the passion that could be extinguished", which is expressed by the "Shut Up" in the chorus. Love is not seen as being eternal and is only related to the present. It seals the pact of "a requirement of absolute sincerity" in which no error must be committed by one of the lovers, and no routine must appear.

== Music video ==
The music video was produced as an anime by Production I.G, a famous Japanese anime company and was written by Katsuhiro Ôtomo after a strip cartoon by Osamu Tezuka, and was directed by Kusumi Naoko, with Kazuchika Kise as character designer and animation director, and Shuichi Hirata as art director. It was originally intended to illustrate "Fuck Them All", as the booklet of Music Video IV proves it, indicating that the video was produced in 2005.

On 7 July 2006, the music video was presented by Universal in a twenty-second version on mobile phone, and in its full version by Orange, the day after. Then it was also presented on several websites : on Yahoo Music five days after, and on Orange website, on 21 July. This anime video depicts Farmer as a young and sexy woman with the bun she wore during her second series of concerts tour in 1996. Author Erwan Chuberre considered that the video was "certainly the most innovative one of the year." As the video ends with the death of two lovers who perish when entwined, pierced by an arrow, Royer said that the message of this video is the same as in the story of Romeo and Juliet, i.e. only death can guarantee the eternity of love. Major themes of the video are rebellion and love.

The video, presented on television on 19 July 2006, was the most broadcast of those from the album Avant que l'ombre.... It was also available as download on iTunes on 29 July. During a musical programme named Les 100 Meilleurs Clips du XXIè siècle aired on MCM on 25 February 2007, this video reached number four (behind those of "Fuck Them All" at number one, and "Redonne-moi" at number three) thanks to the voters of the television viewers. On the Yahoo Music France site, the video was awarded "Best Animated Clip 2006".

== Promotion and live performances ==
"Peut-être toi" was never performed on television, but was the opening song of the 2006 series of concerts. It began with a huge "Shut up!", then a cylindrical glass coffin suspended in the airs in which the singer was locked up appeared, went down to the central cross-shaped stage. Six men dressed in black moved it to the center of the stage and placed it on a pedestal. It bowed upright and opened. While the whole stage was then illuminated in red, Farmer, dressed in light brown, came out of it and began to perform the song, starting with the first verse, instead of the refrain.

== Chart performances ==
The single obtained its highest position in France where it debuted at number three on 26 August, selling a peak of 18,144 units. The next weeks, it dropped and remained for a total of nine weeks in top 50 and 15 weeks on the chart. According to the SNEP, "Peut-être toi" was the 97th best-selling singles from the first nine months of 2006.

The single went to number 24 on Belgian (Wallonia) Ultratop 40 Single Chart on 2 September, and jumped to a peak of number 12 the week after, then dropped. It fell off the chart after seven weeks. In Switzerland, "Peut-être toi" peaked at number 34 in the first week, on 3 September. Then, it crumbled very quickly and remained in the top 100 for seven weeks.

== Formats and track listings ==
These are the formats and track listings of single releases of "Peut-être toi":

- CD single - Digipack - Limited edition

No.	Title	Length
1.	"Peut-être toi"	3:40
2.	"Peut-être toi" (instrumental)	3:46

- CD maxi - Digipack - Limited edition

No.	Title	Length
1.	"Peut-être toi" (single version)	3:40
2.	"Peut-être toi" (Miss Farmer's remix)	4:10
3.	"Peut-être toi" (Cox's remix club mix)	6:58
4.	"Peut-être toi" (full vocal Cox's remix)	8:46

- CD single - Promo

No.	Title	Length
1.	"Peut-être toi" (radio edit)	3:45
2.	"Peut-être toi" (Miss Farmer's remix)	4:10

- 7" maxi / 7" maxi - Promo

No.	Title	Length
1.	"Peut-être toi" (Cox's remix - club mix)	6:58
2.	"Peut-être toi" (Miss Farmer's remix)	4:10
3.	"Peut-être toi" (single version)	3:45

- Digital download

No.	Title	Length
1.	"Peut-être toi" (radio edit)	3:45
2.	"Peut-être toi" (Miss Farmer's remix)	4:10
3.	"Peut-être toi" (album version)	4:45
4.	"Peut-être toi" (2006 live version)	3:27
5.	"Peut-être toi" (video)	4:04

- DVD - Promo

No.	Title	Length
1.	"Peut-être toi" (radio edit)	4:04

== Release history ==
Date	Label	Region	Format	Catalog
26 June 2006	Polydor	France, Belgium, Switzerland	CD single - Promo	11 233
July 2006	Polydor	France, Belgium, Switzerland	7" maxi - Promo	11 234
21 August 2006	Polydor	France, Belgium, Switzerland	7" maxi	984 206-8
21 August 2006	Polydor	France, Belgium, Switzerland	CD single	984 206-9
21 August 2006	Polydor	France, Belgium, Switzerland	CD maxi	984 207-0

== Official versions ==
Version	Length	Album	Remixed by	Year	Comment
Album version	4:55	Avant que l'ombre...	—	2005	See the previous sections
Single version / Radio edit	3:45	—	Laurent Boutonnat	2006	This remixed version is shorter, more dynamic and with additional sonorities (sounds of bells, more synthesizers and drum) than the album version.
Instrumental	3:46	—	Laurent Boutonnat	2006	All the lyrics, even the "Shut up" in the vocals, are deleted.
Miss Farmer's remix	4:10	—	The Bionix	2006	This remix had R&B sonorities and some "Shut the fuck up" repeated throughout the song.
Cox's remix - club mix	6:58	—	Chris Cox	2006	
Full vocal Cox's remix	8:46	—	Chris Cox	2006	
Music video	4:19	Music Videos IV	—	2006	
Live version (recorded in 2006)	3:27 (audio); 3:22 (video)	Avant que l'ombre... à Bercy	—	2006	See Avant que l'ombre... à Bercy (tour)

== Credits and personnel ==
These are the credits and the personnel as they appear on the back of the single:

- Mylène Farmer – lyrics
- Laurent Boutonnat – music
- Requiem Publishing – editions
- Polydor – recording company
- Kazuchika Kise (Production I.G) – illustration
- Henry Neu – design

Full vocal Cox's remix

- Chris Cox – producer
- Keith "KLM" Litman – additional arranging
- Chris Cox at Noho Porn Labs, Los Angeles, CA – all programming, engineering and mixing

== Charts and sales ==
Chart (2006)	Peak position
Belgium (Ultratop 50 Wallonia)	12
CIS Airplay (TopHit)	162
France (SNEP)	3
Switzerland (Schweizer Hitparade)	34

Country	Certification	Physical sales
France	—	50,000
