= Q.I (song) =

Single by Mylène Farmer

from the album Avant que l'ombre...
- B-side: Instrumental (CD single); Remixes (CD maxi)
- Released: 4 June 2005
- Recorded: 2005, France
- Genre: Pop rock, trip hop
- Length: 5:20 (single version); 3:55 (radio edit)
- Label: Polydor
- Songwriters: Lyrics: Mylène Farmer; Music: Laurent Boutonnat
- Producer: Laurent Boutonnat

Mylène Farmer singles chronology
"Fuck Them All" (2005)	"Q.I" (2005)	"Redonne-moi" (2006)

"Q.I" (French, 'IQ') is a 2005 song recorded by French singer-songwriter Mylène Farmer. It was the second single from her sixth studio album, Avant que l'ombre..., and was released on 4 July 2005. Like all other tracks from the album, the lyrics were written by Farmer and the music was composed by Laurent Boutonnat. The primary meaning of the song is the attraction to one's partner's intelligence, but the lyrics are ambiguous enough to allow a more sexual interpretation. The accompanying music video was filmed by Benoît Lestang in Budapest and starred Rafael Amargo and Farmer, performing soft erotic scenes in a bedroom; however, the video was not well received. Variously received by the media, the song became a top ten hit in France and Belgium (Wallonia).

== Background and release ==
Since the album release, many fans wanted "Q.I" released as a single, viewing it as a potential hit. The song was played for the first time on NRJ on 13 May in a short version, without the musical bridge and the second chorus. The first remix was produced by Chris Cox to win over the general public and premiered on NRJ on 15 June. It was heavily played on radios and was followed by two longer remixes by Cox, who also remixed "Désenchantée" on the 2003 album RemixeS, then "Peut-être toi", intended for the dance floors. Two other remixes were produced and broadcast: a techno remix with a slow rhythm, the 'CQFD R.club' by Syd, who had already remixed "Libertine" and "Fuck Them All" in 2003 and 2005 respectively, and an electronic and slow remix, the 'rodin's extended club mix', by the Liquid Twins, who also took part in a remix of "L'amour n'est rien...". The single was eventually released in three formats — CD single, CD maxi, 7" maxi – on 4 June, two months after its first broadcast on radio. There was a printing error on the maxi vinyl: part of the remixes was engraved on both sides with other songs unrelated to Farmer.

== Music and lyrics ==
"Q.I" deals with a sexual topic while pretending to be about intelligence. In the lyrics, Farmer says she is seduced by her lover's IQ — 'Q.I.' in French – and this acronym becomes a pretext for many equivocal puns, some of them are similar to the ones in the song "Con c'est con ces conséquences", written by Serge Gainsbourg for Jane Birkin. The refrain "evokes caresses and sexual intercourse". The song's lyrics mix sex and intellect in the way that women consider physical love. As a result, the French newspaper Ouest-France deemed "QI" a "mischievously erotic" song. French author Erwan Chuberre stated, "Lyrics are delightfully perverse and the melody is as catchy as a tonic gym workout conducted by Véronique and Davina." According to French author Julien Rigal, Farmer is surprising in the lyrics, as it was the first time that she evokes sexuality so boldly, using familiar words such as "culs" and "cons"; he said the song is "an ode, not to sexuality, but to the intellectual pleasure".

== Music video ==
Inspired by Canadian film director David Cronenberg, the much debated music video for "Q.I." shows Mylène Farmer and Spanish dancer Rafael Amargo in sensual scenes.

The music video was shot in Budapest, Hungary, by Benoît Lestang, a make up specialist who had worked for Giorgino in 1993, and was a scenarist in several French films, such as La Cité des enfants perdus, Le Hussard sur le toit, Le Pacte des loups, and Arsène Lupin. He had also created the doll featured in the video clip "Sans contrefaçon". The very simple screenplay was written by Mylène Farmer. Rafael Amargo, the pseudonym used by Jesus Rafael Garcia Hernandez, a Spanish dancer and choreographer born in 1975, appears in it.

The music video starts by showing Farmer featured on a giant screen laid out on a building in a city in the rain. At the same time, a man in his apartment looks at the screen and touches it through the wet window pane. Then Farmer, smiling, is in his apartment, wearing net stockings and needle heels, and sits on a leather armchair. She looks at the man who is reading a book next to her. With her heels, she starts to take off the man's shirt and strips him to the waist. Behind a blue pane, they begin a choreography of which only the shades are shown. Then, sitting on a bed in the library, Farmer clasps the man and has sex with him. She passes her hands along the man's back and buries them under his skin. The images of the choreography intersect with the video clip until the end. At the end of the song, the screen goes off. In the end credits, Farmer thanks Benoît di Sabato, her companion.

The video premiered on television on 29 June 2005. Journalist Caroline Bee considered that "in this video the whole influence of David Cronenberg on Benoît Lestang's work can be found" and believed that the staging recalls the performance of "Libertine" during the 1996 tour, when Farmer sang in a chair. However, the video was considered disappointing by many fans of Farmer and generally received critical reviews accusing it of being too simple, as Erwan Chuberre said, "There is nothing transcendent...all that remains modest and the audience bored". The psychologist Hugh Royer stated that the singer has a too sleek look in this video, noting her "hair carefully curled and lacqued" and her "sophisticated make up", which would have "harmed the goal of the video", i.e. showing a couple in their daily lives.

== Promotion and live performances ==
The song was never performed on television; in July 2005, however, the single was promoted on television with three 15- to 30-second advertisements showing excerpts of the music video, although one of them was censored. According to the description of the 2006 concerts at Bercy by Rigal on his website, Farmer took off her big black hat when she sang "Q.I" on stage, and performed a new choreography with her female singers. She asked the audience to raise their arms in the air and to sing with her the last background vocals.

== Critical reception ==
The song was generally well received by critics, despite some criticism. For example, according to journalist Thierry Coljon of Belgian newspaper Le Soir, "Q.I" is one of the songs that emerge from the album Avant que l'ombre..., adding however that while having a "catchy melody", its lyrics are a "little facile". Platine viewed "Q.I" as a song whose lyrics are "tasty", but also "as violent as "Fuck Them All""'s, while the "up-tempo music is also very effective". According to Isabelle Cardin of Rolling Stone, "Q.I" and "Peut-être toi" are "lively" songs, "potentially singles specially devoted to the dancefloors. More critical was Éric Mandel of Le Journal du Dimanche, who stated, "We border on ridiculous and vulgar with the song "Q.I"". Magazine Ça se passe comme ça ironized by saying that the song "would like to be X rating. Sexually explicit then, but still very behind Gainsbourg". The sophisticated CD sent to the radio stations was considered a "masterpiece" by Rigal, who also praised all the remixes as being "good".

== Commercial performance ==
In France, the single debuted on 2 July at number 77 on the singles chart, two days before the official release as some stores had already sold it. As all Farmer's singles since "L'Âme-stram-gram", "Q.I" entered the top ten, at number seven, the following week, selling 20,551 units. Subsequently, the single dropped and remained in the top 50 for eight weeks in the top 50 and on the chart for eighteen weeks. According to the Syndicat National de l'Édition Phonographique, it was the 99th best-selling single of 2005. In Switzerland, "Q.I" peaked at number 33 on 17 July, before dropping quickly and falling off the chart after ten weeks, on 25 September. The single reached its peak position in the Belgian (Wallonia) Ultratop Singles Chart where it hit number four on 23 July after a debut at number eight during the previous week. It remained in the top ten for five weeks and on the chart for eleven weeks. On the 2005 annual chart, "Q.I" ranked number 50. The song was also the eleventh-most internationally broadcast French song in 2005.

== Formats and track listings ==
These are the formats and track listings of single releases of "Q.I":

- CD single

No.	Title	Length
1.	"Q.I" (single version)	5:20
2.	"Q.I" (sanctuary's radio edit)	4:10
3.	"Q.I" (instrumental)	5:20

- CD maxi – Digipack / International CD maxi

No.	Title	Length
1.	"Q.I" (single version)	5:20
2.	"Q.I" (sanctuary's edited club mix)	8:27
3.	"Q.I" (CQFD R.club)	5:00
4.	"Q.I" (rodin's extended club mix)	4:58

- 12" maxi / 12" maxi – Promo

No.	Title	Length
1.	"Q.I" (sanctuary's club remix)	10:55
2.	"Q.I" (rodin's extended club mix)	4:58
3.	"Q.I" (single version)	5:20

- Digital download

No.	Title	Length
1.	"Q.I" (single version)	5:23
2.	"Q.I" (sanctuary's radio edit)	4:11
3.	"Q.I" (instrumental)	5:22

- CD single – Promo – Limited edition (500) / CD single – Promo – Leather luxurious edition

No.	Title	Length
1.	"Q.I" (radio edit)	3:55

- DVD – Promo

No.	Title	Length
1.	"Q.I" (video)	4:00

== Official versions ==
Version	Length	Album	Remixed by	Year	Comment
Album / Single version	5:20	Avant que l'ombre...	—	2005	See the previous sections
Radio edit	3:55	—	Laurent Boutonnat	2005	The musical bridge and some refrains are deleted. The song ends in fade-out.
Instrumental	5:20	—	Laurent Boutonnat	2005	All lyrics, even vocals, are deleted.
Sanctuary's radio edit	4:10	—	Chris Cox	2005	This dance remix, devoted to the discothèques, is faster and more dynamic than the album version. There are numerous "Ton Q.I, mon cul est, ton Q.I, C.Q.F.D" throughout the song.
Sanctuary's edit club mix	8:27	—	Chris Cox	2005	This dance and techno remix is the same as the 'sanctuary's radio edit', but it is longer.
Sanctuary's club remix	10:55	—	Chris Cox	2005	This dance and techno remix is the same as the 'sanctuary's edit club mix', but it is longer.
CQFD R.club	5:00	—	Syd	2005	This is an acid techno remix with many electronic sounds.
Rodin's extended club mix	4:58	—	Liquid Twins	2005	This is an electronic version which contains the whole of lyrics from the original version.
Music video	4:00	Music Videos IV	—	2005	The video uses the radio edit version.
Live version (recorded in 2006)	6:58 (CD, DVD); 5:48 (vinyl)	Avant que l'ombre... à Bercy	—	2006	See Avant que l'ombre... à Bercy (tour)

== Credits and personnel ==
These are the credits and the personnel as they appear on the back of the single:

- Mylène Farmer – lyrics
- Laurent Boutonnat – music
- Requiem Publishing – editions
- Polydor – recording company
- Dominique Issermann – photo
- Henry Neu – design

== Charts ==
=== Weekly charts ===
Chart (2005)	Peak position
Belgium (Ultratop 50 Wallonia)	4
CIS Airplay (TopHit)	156
France (SNEP)	7
France Airplay (SNEP)	42
France Digital (SNEP)	9
Switzerland (Schweizer Hitparade)	33

=== Year-end charts ===
Chart (2005)	Position
Belgium (Ultratop 50 Wallonia)	50
France (SNEP)	99

=== Sales ===
Country	Certification	Sales
France	—	64,763 + downloads = 80,000

== Release history ==
Region	Date	Format
France, Belgium, Switzerland	13 May 2005	Promo CD single
France, Belgium, Switzerland	June 2005	Promo 12" maxi
France, Belgium, Switzerland	4 July 2005	CD single, CD maxi, 12" maxi
