= XXL (Mylène Farmer song) =

1995 single by Mylène Farmer

Single by Mylène Farmer

from the album Anamorphosée
- B-side: "Remix"
- Released: 19 September 1995
- Genre: Variété
- Length: 4:25 (single version)
- Label: Polydor
- Composer: Laurent Boutonnat
- Lyricist: Mylène Farmer
- Producer: Laurent Boutonnat

Mylène Farmer singles chronology
"Que mon cœur lâche" (1993)	"XXL" (1995)	"L'Instant X" (1995)

"XXL" is a song recorded by French singer-songwriter Mylène Farmer, released on 19 September 1995, by Polydor Records, as the lead single from her fourth studio album, Anamorphosée (1995). It marked an important change in the singer's career, with more pronounced variété sonorities, more accessible lyrics, and a music video directed by a new producer, Marcus Nispel. Although it entered directly at number one on the French singles chart, it dropped quickly and achieved mixed success.

== Background and writing ==
After the failure of Laurent Boutonnat's film Giorgino in 1993, in which she played, Farmer decided to move to Los Angeles, willing to return to anonymity. In 1995, she found the inspiration to write new songs by reading various books, including La Mort intime by French author Marie de Hennezel, and The Tibetan Book of Living and Dying. She then asked Laurent Boutonnat to join her in California to produce together a new album, which would become Anamorphosée. However, following the failure of Giorgino, they decided to propose a new public image for the singer, and a new sound with rock sensibilities, inspired by the success of grunge and alternative rock scene in the early 1990s. When the French channel M6 announced the name and content of the first single, "XXL", it surprised the fans, since the album was not released yet. Long-term fans did not expect such a musical departure; some of them decided to turn their back on the new universe proposed by the duo Farmer / Boutonnat, but a new public was won over.

The promotion began on 24 August 1995. Some medias received a sizeable custom-made display rack, designed by Henry Neu, consisting of a giant "XXL" made in wrought iron, with the CD placed between the two "X" letters. The CD single was released on 19 September 1995. The various remixes on the four formats were all produced by Laurent Boutonnat and Bertrand Châtenet. It was Farmer's first single cover on which she did not appear (the second was later "L'Histoire d'une fée, c'est...").

Another remix, named 'UK remix', has been made about a year later by Richard Dekkard, and released on the "Rêver" CD maxi. As for the 'JXL remix', it was produced by the Dutch musician Junkie XL and features on the compilation RemixeS.

== Lyrics and music ==
"XXL" can be interpreted as a feminist song, in which Farmer expresses women's need of love, in the form of a prayer. For the first time, the message of her song is not universal, since it is exclusively for women. She evokes all kinds of women: bourgeois, homeless, romantic, pessimistic, feminists, anti-abortion, great ladies, prostitutes, transsexuals, celebrities, women who are suffering or not from the AIDS virus. The name of the song is a reference to the largest size of ready-to-wear clothes in the United-States. Unlike most of the songs lyrics written by Farmer, which tend to be cryptic and loaded with literary references, those of "XXL" are relatively straightforward and easy to understand.

The song has a rock sound with riffs by guitarist Jeff Dahlgren, "electric guitars are ultra-present, the rhythm is more aggressive". As its very outset, the track has a strong driving rhythm.

== Music video ==
Mylène Farmer, hooked at the front of the 1910 locomotive used in Richard Attenborough's film Chaplin, wears a dress made by fashion designer Thierry Mugler.

Unlike Farmer's previous music videos, this one was not directed by Laurent Boutonnat, but by Marcus Nispel. This Requiem Publishing production cost about 80,000 euros (230,000 euros, according to journalist Benoît Cachin) and was shot in two days one for Farmer, one for the extras – in August 1995, in Fillmore, California, on the Fillmore and Western Railway. Based on an idea by Farmer, the video shows a 1910 locomotive being driven at high speed, which is frequently interpreted as a symbol of sexual intercourse.-This train was also used in the 1992 movie Chaplin, directed by Richard Attenborough

Producer Anouk Nora explained that some difficulties were met during the shooting: "The idea of putting the artist hanging in front of a moving train, it was unthinkable. Because in the United States, they are sticklers on security issues." Thus, it was necessary to sign release forms in order to allow the filming. Moreover, Farmer burned herself twice during the shooting. For the shooting, the singer remained hung on this locomotive for nearly five hours under a 40 °C temperature and was scared because it ran sometimes very quickly. She wore a dress made by French fashion designer Thierry Mugler. No tricks were used, and according to author Erwan Chuberre, "the staging is firmly photographic", but there is "no screenplay". In the video, Farmer appears much more "glamorous and sophisticated woman" than before and "proudly proclaims her femininity".

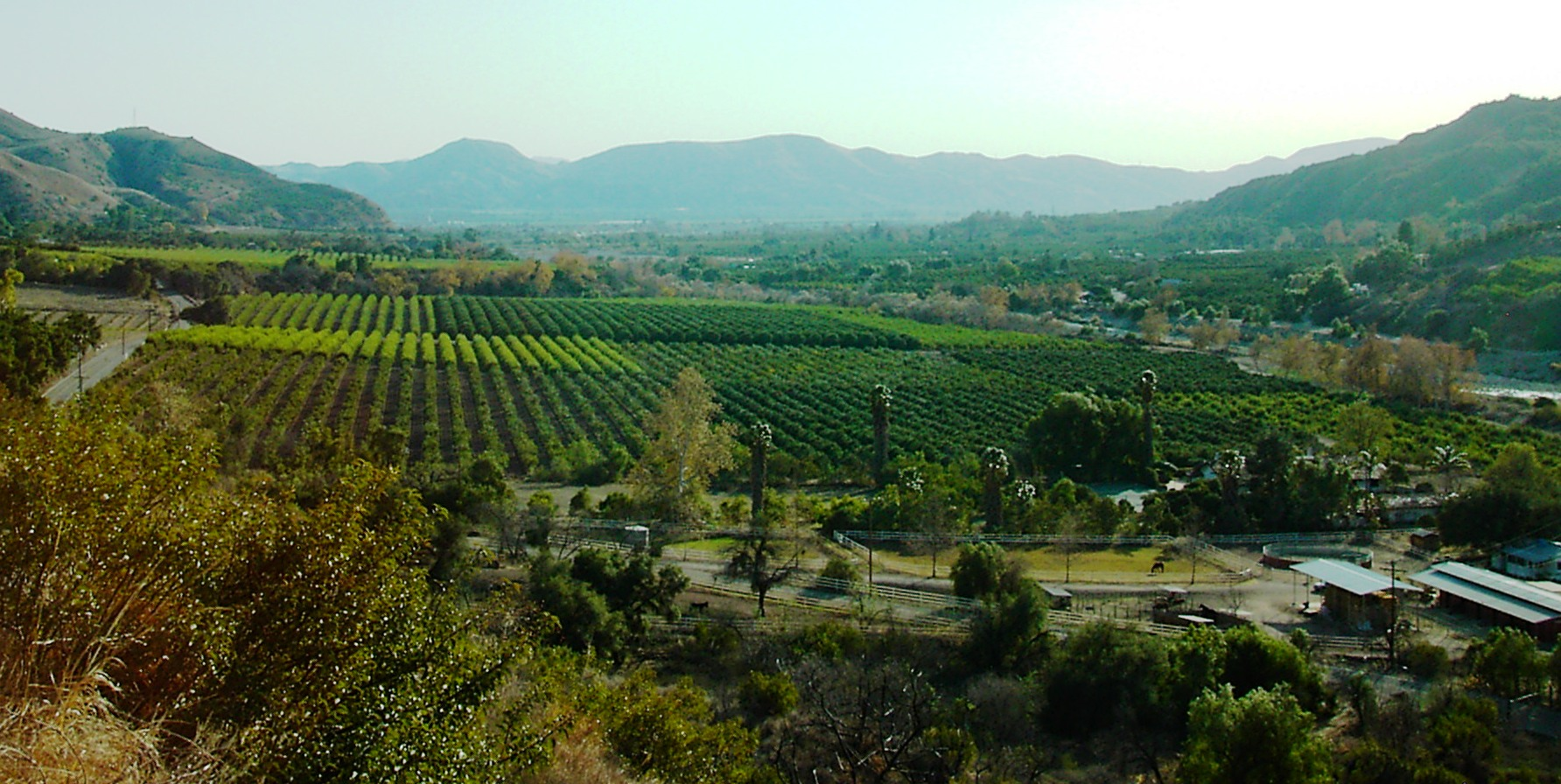
The music video for "XXL" was shot in Fillmore, California.

The video premiered on 18 September 1995 on M6. Shot in black and white, it features Farmer hung on at the front of a moving locomotive, filmed in an orange grove. These images alternate with those of the train passengers who are very different from each other (social origin, race, age, marital status...). The action probably takes place in the United States in the mid-twentieth century, as evidenced by the sets and costumes.

== Live performances and cover versions ==
The song was never performed on television, but was performed on the 1996, 2006, 2009, 2013 and 2023 concerts.

The song was the last one performed during the 1996 tour, and is also the last on the Live à Bercy album from that tour. It began with the sound of a train, then the scene was fumigated. Farmer, raised on a hoist, wore an indented black outfit, and her dancers wore pants and a golden tank top. The song was scheduled for the 2000 Mylenium Tour, but finally rejected. During the 2006 series of concerts, the hall was fully blue when "XXL" was performed. The singer asked the audience to clap their hands, and at the end of the song, the refrain was repeated by Farmer and the audience. The song was performed again on the 2009 tour; Farmer wore a glittering short dress with red cape with hood; at one point, she caresses her guitarists from the torso to the crotch. For the 2013 Timeless Tour, "XXL" was performed as the 17th song of the setlist. This version had a melancholic intro with samples of "A-t-on jamais" from her album Monkey Me, then, after the first verse, the song turned into its original arrangement while rotating lights lit up the crowd and the stage. Mylène wore a black suit with a white shirt, and black tie and black high-heeled shoes. During this tour, Mylène asked the crowd to sing the chorus only on a few dates.

The song was parodied in 1996 by Le Festival Roblès under the title "L'Amour en 4L", and was covered by Rejane in 1998. In 2009, Belgian singer Jonatan Cerrada made a comeback in his singing career with an acoustic cover version of "XXL". In 2010, Les Enfoirés recorded a cover of the song for their album La Crise de nerfs!; the singers on this version are Amel Bent, Grégoire Boissenot, Hélène Segara, Lorie, Renan Luce and Lââm for the verses.

== Chart performances ==
On 23 September 1995, the single entered directly at number one on French Top 50 singles chart, making it her third top charting single. However, the single dropped quickly over the next weeks. It remained for five weeks in the top 10 and was listed for a total of twelve weeks in the Top 50. It was the 42nd best-selling single of the year 1995 in France. In December 2017, the single was re-edited and re-entered the chart at number 27, staying three weeks in the top 200.

In Belgium (Wallonia), the single ranked on the Ultratop 50 chart for 14 weeks, from 7 October 1995 to 6 January 1996. It went straight into the top ten and reached a peak of number three for two non-consecutive weeks. It totaled seven weeks in the top ten and was the 36th best-selling single of 1995.

"XXL" stayed on Swiss Singles Chart for ten weeks, from 15 October to 17 December 1995, including a peaked at number 11 on 5 November, then dropped. This peak position remains for Farmer her highest placement in Switzerland.

== Formats and track listings ==
These are the formats and track listings of single releases of "XXL":

- CD single – Black CD with white writing / CD single – Gilt CD / CD single – Japan – Long box

No.	Title	Length
1.	"XXL" (single version)	4:23
2.	"XXL" (no voice remix edit)	4:20

- CD maxi – Crystal case / CD maxi – Digipack

No.	Title	Length
1.	"XXL" (single version)	4:23
2.	"XXL" (distorded dance mix)	5:20
3.	"XXL" (extra large remix)	5:02
4.	"XXL" (new remix edit)	4:25

- CD maxi – Germany

No.	Title	Length
1.	"XXL" (single version)	4:27
2.	"XXL" (extra large remix)	5:06
3.	"XXL" (new remix edit)	4:43
4.	"XXL" (distorded dance mix)	5:19
5.	"XXL" (single dance mix)	4:23

- 12" maxi

No.	Title	Length
1.	"XXL" (extra large remix)	5:02
2.	"XXL" (distorded dance mix)	5:20

== Official versions ==
Version	Length	Album	Remixed by	Year	Comment
Album version	4:45	Anamorphosée, Les Mots	—	1995	See the previous sections
Single version	4:23	—	Laurent Boutonnat	1995	
No voice remix edit	4:20	—	Laurent Boutonnat, Bertrand Châtenet	1995	It is an instrumental version with a remixed music, more techno and dance, and in which Farmer sings only "XXL".
Extra large remix	5:02	—	Laurent Boutonnat, Bertrand Châtenet	1995	There are many voices at the beginning and several sighs. It is a rock and techno version devoted to the discothèques. Chorus are changed.
Distorded dance mix	5:20	—	Laurent Boutonnat, Bertrand Châtenet	1995	This version adds dance sonorities, with numerous sighs.
New remix edit	4:25	—	Laurent Boutonnat, Bertrand Châtenet	1995	This version adds dance sonorities, with numerous sighs.
Single dance mix	4:25	—	Laurent Boutonnat, Bertrand Châtenet	1995	This version is similar to the 'no voice remix edit'.
New remix edit (Germany)	4:43	—	Laurent Boutonnat, Bertrand Châtenet	1995	This is the same version than the 'New Remix Edit', but longer.
German radio edit	3:54	—	Laurent Boutonnat, Bertrand Châtenet	1995	The introduction is shortened and electric guitar arrangement begins very promptly.
Music video	4:22	Music Videos II, Music Videos II & III	—	1995	
UK remix	9:00	—	Richard Dekkard	1996	This is a techno version.
Live version (recorded in 1996)	7:25	Live à Bercy	—	1996	The song begins with the sound of a locomotive and its rolling, then is followed by the introduction with more rock sounds than on the album. (see 1996 Tour)
JXL remix	6:06	RemixeS	Junkie XL	2003	This is a disco version, with a 1:15 musical introduction.
Live version (recorded in 2006)	5:28	Avant que l'ombre...	—	2006	See Avant que l'ombre... à Bercy (tour)
Live version (recorded in 2009)	4:30	N°5 on Tour	—	2009	This version is similar to the one at the Avant que l'ombre... à Bercy concert series. (see Mylène Farmer en tournée)

== Credits and personnel ==
These are the credits and the personnel as they appear on the back of the single:

- Mylène Farmer – lyrics
- Laurent Boutonnat – music, mixing
- Bertrand Châtenet – mixing
- Requiem Publishing – editions
- Com'N.B – design

== Charts ==
=== Weekly charts ===
Chart (1995)	Peak position
Belgium (Ultratop 50 Wallonia)	3
Europe (Eurochart Hot 100)	11
Europe (European Hit Radio)	39
France (SNEP)	1
Switzerland (Schweizer Hitparade)	11
Quebec (ADISQ)	10

Chart (2017)	Peak position
France (SNEP)	27

=== Year-end charts ===
Chart (1995)	Position
Belgium (Ultratop 50 Wallonia)	36
Belgium Francophone (Ultratop 50 Wallonia)	8
Europe (European Hot 100)	82
France (SNEP)	42

== Release history ==
Region(s)	Date	Format
France, Belgium, Switzerland	19 September 1995	CD single, CD maxi, 12" maxi
Japan	19 September 1995	CD single
Germany	October 1995	CD maxi

== Bibliography ==
- Bee, Caroline; Bioy, Antoine; Thiry, Benjamin (January 2006). Mylène Farmer, la part d’ombre (in French). L'Archipel. ISBN 2-84187-790-6.
- Cachin, Benoît (2006). Le Dictionnaire des Chansons de Mylène Farmer (in French). Tournon. ISBN 2-35144-000-5.
- Chuberre, Erwan (2007). L’Intégrale Mylène Farmer (in French). City. ISBN 978-2-35288-108-7.
- Chuberre, Erwan (2008). Mylène Farmer, phénoménale (in French). City. ISBN 978-2-35288-176-6.
- Chuberre, Erwan (18 June 2009). Mylène Farmer : Des mots sur nos désirs (in French). Alphée. ISBN 978-2-7538-0477-7.
- Khairallah, Sophie (2007). Mylène Farmer, le culte - L’Envers du décor (in French). Why Not. ISBN 978-2-916611-25-9.
- Rajon, Florence (2005). Mylène Farmer de A à Z (in French). MusicBook. ISBN 2-84343-319-3.
- Royer, Hugues (2008). Mylène, biographie (in French). Spain: Flammarion. ISBN 978-2-35287-139-2.
- Violet, Bernard (2004). Mylène Farmer, biographie (in French). J’ai lu. ISBN 2-290-34916-X.
