= Fuck Them All =

Single by Mylène Farmer

from the album Avant que l'ombre...
- B-side: Instrumental (CD single); Remixes (CD maxi)
- Released: 14 March 2005
- Recorded: 2005, France
- Genre: Pop rock, trip hop
- Length: 4:30
- Label: Polydor
- Songwriters: Lyrics: Mylène Farmer; Music: Laurent Boutonnat
- Producer: Laurent Boutonnat

Mylène Farmer singles chronology
"Pardonne-moi" (2002)	"Fuck Them All" (2005)	"Q.I" (2005)

"Fuck Them All" is a 2005 song recorded by French singer-songwriter Mylène Farmer. Released on 14 March 2005, it was the lead single from her sixth studio album, Avant que l'ombre.... Like all tracks from the album, the lyrics were written by the singer with music composed by Laurent Boutonnat. "Fuck Them All" combines pop music elements with acoustic guitar, electronic beats and synths, with a musical bridge sung as a rap in English. As a result, it is often compared to Madonna's early 2000s songs. Using both crude and colorful lyrics, including sex and vulgarity, the song deals with the war between the sexes and was often considered a feminist plea in which women are presented as warriors.

The original music video to the song, filmed by Agustí Villaronga in Romania over two days, shows Farmer portraying two women in a warehouse, with scarecrows made by Swiss artist Martial Leiter. The video was generally praised for its aesthetic qualities but criticized for its lack of innovation.

Farmer sang "Fuck Them All" during her 2006 series of concert at Bercy and the performance was released on the Avant que l'ombre... à Bercy DVD.

The song received a mixed critical reception from fans and the general public, reviews ranging from "unconvincing" and "vulgar" to "bold" and "catchy". Despite this, the song was downloaded over 5,000 times from official download platforms during its first week of release. It met some success on the French and Belgian (Wallonia) charts, where it reached number two and eventually became the album's best-selling single. In France, it earned a silver disc for over 100,000 units sold.

== Background and release ==
On 16 December 2004, Farmer gave a press conference to talk about her planned thirteen concerts at Paris-Bercy in January 2006 and the release of her new album in March 2005, but said nothing about the lead single of her next album. When this new single was announced in the media, persistent rumors claimed that the title would be "Aime" [Love, imperative]. In January 2005, the exact title, "Fuck Them All", was eventually presented as a strong possibility by the French magazine Voici, which also provided the theme of the song – the war of the sexes. As noted by author and expert of French charts Élia Habib, the song title was in "the language of Shakespeare, which the singer had not used since her 1992 single "Beyond My Control"". At the time, many fans, however, believed that this title was a joke or a rumor as it sounded too much like a direct provocation, even a scathing insult, which was rather unusual in Farmer's career. As with other singles from Avant que l'ombre..., the lyrics were written by Mylène Farmer with the music composed by Laurent Boutonnat.

The single was played for the first time on 8 February 2005 on many radio stations, including NRJ which broadcast it every 30 minutes, preceded by a medley of Farmer's previous hits. The song was announced with the comment: "This is the new sound of Mylène Farmer". It was also the singer's first song to be available as a digital download in February 2005, and was also released as a single other two times: first, the CD single on 14 March 2005, then the CD maxi and the vinyl, which contain the remixes, on 18 April 2005. There were three official remix versions: 'mother f... vocal mix' and 'mother f... dub mix', by Joachim Garraud, as well as 'the martyr's remix', by Y-Front, who had already remixed "Libertine" on the album RemixeS. The photo for the cover was taken by Robin and shows Farmer sitting on the roof of a building near the Gare du Nord in Paris. An international CD maxi version was also released but under the title "F**k Them All" to avoid censorship, with a sticker "Parental advisory – Explicit content" attached.

== Music and lyrics ==
This song is characterized by its music produced from synthetic keyboards, and has been criticized for its lack of innovation, its musical bridge containing vulgar lyrics (with rap) reminiscent of Madonna's song "American Life", and what sounds like choirs of children on guitar riffs, which are actually the singer's voice remixed. According to journalist Alice Novak, the song begins with "trippy and mysterious" notes played on keyboards, then continues with "fast and nervous" sounds on the drum machine; the tone is "rather dark, hypnotic", with an "swaying and repetitive" end which uses "the machinery of the lyrics of some rap groups". Author Erwan Chuberre deemed the lyrics "easy, but deep" and contain an allusion to Farmer's friend Marie Trintignant, who died in 2003.

The song deals with a feminist theme of the war of the sexes. It is a "feminist plea about women's place in history" with the title referring to the "cowardice of men". In the song, Farmer "reverses the roles", and "presents women as warriors". In the first couplet, she evokes "the role of women in History", recalling that "all the great men had on their side a woman to support, assist and advise them". However, the singer said that "all this was done to the detriment of women and cites as example, Mary, Jesus Christ's mother, a symbol of martyrdom and self-sacrifice". She denounces "the hypocrisy and the chatter of men who think only about power and sex". In the refrain, she advises women to rebel by taking up arms.

In the lyrics, Farmer "is angry with men and the song is a form of feminist anthem". According to Ouest-France, the combination of an acoustic guitar, electronic beats and synths in the second part of the song, evoke very strongly what Madonna had produced in previous years, and the ethereal song is typical of Farmer. A rap interlude sung in English launches a few insults sometimes thrown at women, before the final refrain. To Marc Bitton of Public who wrote his article before the single release, "lyrics are both crude and colorful", including "sex and vulgarity", and said that the song was likely to be censored, which was, at his point of view, the real purpose of the singer. According to the psychologist Hugues Royer, the song is "an artistic utopia" and a call to feminists, including the novelist Catherine Breillat, but is not a "political project". Novak said that lyrics surprised many fans, as although Farmer has always been a feminist, she had never expressed so direct a message on the subject.

== Music video ==
A scarecrow whose eyes weep black blood, made by the Swiss artist Martial Leiter, in the music video for "Fuck Them All".

Shot in Romania over two days, the video cost approximately 150,000 euros. The scenario was written by Farmer and directed by Spanish film director Agustí Villaronga, then broadcast on television from 9 March 2005. The video for "Peut-être toi" was originally intended to illustrate this song. The scarecrows which feature in the video were made by Swiss artist Martial Leiter. Farmer contacted him after seeing a documentary on France 3 about an open-air exhibition of scarecrows which were an allegory of the human figure. Leiter explained that he was very surprised when he was contacted by the singer's producers and that he was first hesitating, but finally agreed after a discussion with Farmer. He also stated that he was satisfied with the work and was happy to see that Farmer mentioned his name at the end of the video. Initially, Farmer wanted to use the scarecrows seen in the documentary, but Leiter refused to give her those from his exhibition, instead preferring to create some new scarecrows that were easier to break. In the music video, the scarecrows have a black bird skull and wear torn black veils that float in the wind. Several components often used in Farmer's previous music videos appear in this one: snow, a horse, and some crows. The video and its making-of were released as a DVD bonus available free with the second edition of the studio album. In the making-of, Villaronga provides explanations about the video, while Farmer appears "distant and very professional", according to Télé 2 Semaines.

The video starts showing a woman galloping through a snowy forest on horseback. She enters a warehouse where a cage surrounded by crows is suspended by chains. Nearby there is a trapped short-haired woman with a flayed face and crow-like eyes. The first woman stops under the cage and looks up at it. She casts a stone against a wall that reflects her like a mirror and the building collapses. In the snow, she finds a body—the second woman, inanimate and frozen—hidden under a blanket. She closes her eyes, plunges her hands into the body and pulls out a sword. Entering the forest, she sees numerous flying crows and ends up on a snowy plain on which there are erected many scarecrows. During the refrains, she uses her sword to destroy scarecrows, rip their sails and break the wooden crosses. Scarecrows' eyes weep black blood that turns to crows. Then, it is shown how the other woman was killed: the big peaks which covered the ceiling of her cage had gradually collapsed on her. Finally, the living woman plants her sword in the snow, then disappears into the air. Farmer plays the role of both women.

The video received a mixed reception among the singer's fans. Deemed as "gothic" by Jean-Rémy Gaudin-Bridet of Télé Star, the video has "undeniable aesthetic qualities" and allows "great freedom of interpretation", according to author Erwan Chuberre. The French magazine Télé 7 Jours published several analyses proposed on the Internet, which gave mixed reviews, and provided results from a survey revealing that 54% of respondents deemed the video as "pleasant", while 36% expressed total satisfaction. Reviewing the video in Elle magazine, the sociologist Divina Frau-Meigs wrote: "This is a coherent video, with an echo of her previous provocations", adding that Farmer's sword is the symbol of the phallus, and desolate landscapes represent the impossible reconciliation of the sexes. According to Royer, the video shows a personal dimension in which Farmer "finally crushes her interior demons" and "wants to get rid of her trappings as a scapegoat". Despite this, French daily newspaper France Soir deemed the video disappointing because of its lack of innovation. In contrast, the video was the number one choice of voters viewing the TV music program Les 100 Meilleurs clips du XXIè siècle (The best videos of the twenty-first century), aired on MCM on 25 February 2007.

== Live performances ==
Farmer performed the song in 2006 on a series of concerts at Bercy. According to a description by author Julien Rigal in his book on the artist, Farmer performed the song with the seven dancers of Los Vivancos and her female dancers dressed as Japanese people. She asked the audience to shout the 'fuck them all' of the refrain. The bridge of the stage was then lowered and Farmer finished the song on the central cross. She then presented the dancers and said goodnight to the audience. Farmer also sang "Fuck Them All" at the Stade de France in September 2009, in a performance available on the corresponding DVD.

== Critical reception ==
"Fuck Them All"'s music and lyrics received a mixed reception from fans and the general public. According to Société des auteurs, compositeurs et éditeurs de musique, the French musicians' society, the song was downloaded over 5,000 times from official websites during its first week of release, and over one million times illegally. French newspaper Ouest-France gave a rather negative review of the song, saying ""Fuck Them All" is done to revive the provocative aura which is the singer's business (...). [The song] amounts with a bit of confusion, between outrageously precious rhymes and vulgar slogans against male hegemony. (...) With a hint of sulphur as a supplement, it is a choir of young boys who sings 'fuck them all' in the chorus". The single was deemed "unconvincing" in another article of the same newspaper. However, there were also more positive reviews. According to TV Magazine, the single is "catchy both through its provocative title and its quite blooming lyrics". Despite being highly critical of the album Avant que l'ombre..., Swiss magazine L'Hebdo stated: "Very good time surprisingly succeeded, "Fuck Them All" furiously avenges all women sacrificed on the altar of male conquest". As for Novak, "we can only applaud this bold choice". The song and the remixes were rated at 2.5 stars by Allmusic.

== Chart performance ==
In France, released only as a CD single on 14 March 2005, "Fuck Them All" entered the chart at number two five weeks later, after selling 26,688 units, being unable to dislodge Ilona Mitrecey's hit "Un Monde parfait", which topped the chart that week. Élia Habib, an expert on French charts, said: "For "Fuck Them All", to succeed in persisting on the podium, it will have to count on a broader basis of support than that of her traditional fans, [because they are] sufficiently numerous to send the single of their idol in the top 10 in its first week of release, but not to retain it inside the following weeks, as the last superstar's singles had regularly proved it, except "Les Mots" and "C'est une belle journée", which were general public hits". In the following four weeks, the single dropped in the chart, then jumped from number 21 to number three on 3 April 2005, selling 14,701 units that week, through the releases of the CD maxi and vinyl. Then, the song started to fall again off the chart, remaining in the top 50 for 11 weeks and on the top 100 for 19 weeks. Certified Silver by the Syndicat National de l'Édition Phonographique on 25 May 2005, "Fuck Them All" was the 70th best-selling single of 2005.

In Belgium, the single entered the Ultratop 50 Singles Chart on 24 March at number three, then moved up to peak at number two and spent a total of eight weeks in the top ten and 14 weeks on the chart. "Fuck Them All" was the 26th best selling single in 2005. In Switzerland, the single debuted at its peak of number 14 on 27 March 2005 and immediately dropped, although as in France previously, it climbed again on 1 May thanks to CD maxi and vinyl's sales, then began to drop again and remained on the chart for a total of 16 weeks, which was Farmer's longest single chart trajectory on the Swiss Singles Chart at that time. The song began at a peak of number six on the chart edition of 2 April 2005 of the European Hot 100 Singles, then dropped.

== Formats and track listings ==
These are the formats and track listings of single releases of "Fuck Them All":

- CD single

No.	Title	Length
1.	"Fuck Them All"	4:30
2.	"Fuck Them All" (instrumental)	4:32

- CD maxi – Digipack

No.	Title	Length
1.	"Fuck Them All" (single version)	4:39
2.	"Fuck Them All" (mother f... vocal mix)	8:34
3.	"Fuck Them All" (the martyr's remix)	5:26
4.	"Fuck Them All" (mother f... dub mix)	7:55

- CD maxi – International

No.	Title	Length
1.	"F**k Them All" (single version)	4:30
2.	"F**k Them All" (mother f... vocal club mix)	8:30
3.	"F**k Them All" (the martyr's remix)	5:20
4.	"F**k Them All" (mother f... dub mix)	7:50

- 7" maxi / 7" maxi – Promo – Limited edition (500)

No.	Title	Length
1.	"Fuck Them All" (mother f... vocal club mix)	8:30
2.	"Fuck Them All" (the martyr's remix)	5:20
3.	"Fuck Them All" (mother f... dub mix)	7:50

- Digital download

No.	Title	Length
1.	"Fuck Them All" (single version)	4:30
2.	"Fuck Them All" (instrumental)	4:34

- 7" maxi – Monoface, promo – Limited edition (200)

No.	Title	Length
1.	"Fuck Them All" (mother f... remix)	7:50

- CD single – Promo / CD single – Promo – Luxury envelope

No.	Title	Length
1.	"Fuck Them All" (radio edit)	3:55

- DVD – Promo

No.	Title	Length
1.	"Fuck Them All" (video)	5:02

== Official versions ==
Version	Length	Album	Remixed by	Year	Comment
Album/Single version	4:30	Avant que l'ombre...	—	2005	
Radio edit	3:55	—	—	2005	The musical introduction is almost fully deleted, as well as the last refrain, and the musical bridge is shortened.
Instrumental	4:32	—	Laurent Boutonnat	2005	This instrumental version is identical to the album version, but piano and guitars are added.
The martyr's remix	5:20	—	Y-Front	2005	This version contains all the lyrics of the album version and has hard rock sonorities with many guitar riffs in the refrains. The rap bridge from the original version is sampled at the beginning of the remix.
Mother f... dub mix	7:50	—	Joachim Garraud	2005	All the lyrics from the original version are deleted, and only the refrain 'fuck them all' is included. The musical introduction lasts four minutes.
Mother f... vocal club mix	8:30	—	Joachim Garraud	2005	Intended for nightclub distribution, this techno version has a musical introduction which lasts about four minutes, then Farmer almost sings a cappella.
Music video	5:02	Music Videos IV	—	2005	
Live version (recorded in 2006)	6:42 (audio); 8:18 (video)	Avant que l'ombre... à Bercy	—	2006	This version is similar to the album one, with more rhythm. The DVD version is longer as it also contains the presentation of the musicians and dancers. (see Avant que l'ombre... à Bercy (tour))

== Credits and personnel ==
These are the credits and the personnel as they appear on the back of the single:

- Mylène Farmer – lyrics
- Laurent Boutonnat – music
- Requiem Publishing – editions
- Polydor – recording company
- Robin – photo
- Henry Neu – design

Mother F... vocal club mix and Mother F... dub mix

- Joachim Garraud / Square Prod – remix

The martyr's remix

- Y Front / Volvox Music – remix

== Charts and sales ==
=== Weekly charts ===
Weekly chart performance for "Fuck Them All"
Chart (2005)	Peak position
Belgium (Ultratip Bubbling Under Flanders)	17
Belgium (Ultratop 50 Wallonia)	2
CIS Airplay (TopHit)	22
Eurochart Hot 100 Singles	6
France (SNEP)	2
French Airplay Chart	19
Russia Airplay (TopHit)	22
Switzerland (Schweizer Hitparade)	14

=== Year-end charts ===
2005 year-end chart performance for "Fuck Them All"
Chart (2005)	Position
Belgium (Ultratop 50 Wallonia)	26
CIS (TopHit)	90
France (SNEP)	70
Russia Airplay (TopHit)	79

== Certifications and sales ==
Certifications for "Fuck Them All"
Region	Certification	Certified units/sales
France (SNEP)	Silver	100,000^{*}
^{*} Sales figures based on certification alone.

== Release history ==
Region	Date	Format
France, Belgium, Switzerland	February 2005	Digital download
France, Belgium, Switzerland	9 February 2005	Promo CD single
France, Belgium, Switzerland	14 March 2005	CD single
France, Belgium, Switzerland	Early April 2005	Promo vinyl
France, Belgium, Switzerland	18 April 2005	CD maxi, vinyl
Europe, Canada	3 May 2005	CD maxi
