= Redonne-moi =

Single by Mylène Farmer

from the album Avant que l'ombre...
- B-side: "Instrumental"
- Released: 2 January 2006
- Recorded: 2005, France
- Genre: Pop
- Length: 4:24
- Label: Polydor
- Songwriters: Lyrics: Mylène Farmer; Music: Laurent Boutonnat
- Producer: Laurent Boutonnat

Mylène Farmer singles chronology
"Q.I" (2005)	"Redonne-moi" (2006)	"L'amour n'est rien..." (2006)

Alternative cover
- Promo CD

Music video
- "Redonne-moi" on YouTube

"Redonne-moi" (English: "Give Me Back") is a 2005 song recorded by the French artist Mylène Farmer. This pop ballad was the third single from her sixth studio album, Avant que l'ombre..., and was released on 2 January 2006. Like all other tracks of the parent album, it was written by Farmer and the music was composed by Laurent Boutonnat. The song has poetic lyrics and a melancholy music, and is about death, memory, and hope. About three months before the release, Farmer exceptionally accepted to perform the song in a television show, which she did not for other singles from Avant que l'ombre.... The accompanying music video, filmed by François Hanss and broadcast from 11 January 2006, shows Farmer singing in a sculpture workshop. In spite of being a top ten hit in France, "Redonne-moi" became the less-selling single from the album, with rather disappointing sales figures.

== Background and release ==
From August 2005, some rumours went round about the song which could be the third single from the album Avant que l'ombre...: first, "L'amour n'est rien..." was announced; then, in September, "Peut-être toi", "Porno graphique" and "J'attends" were also successively presented as next single. Some pessimistic fan websites said there would not be a third single, as the previous one "Q.I" had been moderately received and the album then continued to drop on the chart.

Finally, "Redonne-moi" was chosen by Farmer, who absolutely wanted this song as next single. Many of Farmer's fans were not satisfied with this choice, as "Redonne-moi" is the slowest song of the album and seemed to lack of commercial potential. A promotional CD single was sent to radios on 13 October. The single was proposed for the first time as digital download on 7 December, but the physical release, originally scheduled for 5 December, was eventually cancelled and delayed on 2 January 2006. Moreover, the song was rarely broadcast on radios, as they considered it too slow.

The single was released in a sole format, a digipack CD single without any remixes, and used for the cover of an unpublished photo produced by Ellen Von Unwerth during a photo session in 2005.

== Lyrics and music ==
This ballad uses very poetic lyrics and a melancholy music, and deals with several recurring themes in Farmer's songs: "death, memory, but also hope". According to an analysis by journalist Benoît Cachin, "Farmer seems to be split : on the one hand, the past symbolized by a ghost that evokes sadness and death, and on the other hand, the future, in which Farmer put her trust, hoping to live in a better way and rediscover the joy of the existence through love". In the refrain, Farmer seems to speak to someone: this may be the ghost, or a person that she loves and whom she requests to help her to forget her past. Psychologist Hugues Royer said that, in this song, Farmer "is toying with the idea of emerging from a black hole. While she sinks in suffering, a friendly voice whispers to her how it could be beneficial to "find a trace of self"", as the singer seems to have forgotten her past. As in "Rêver" and "Ainsi soit je...", some lyrics are sung in the high notes to express sadness.

== Music video ==
The music video was initially announced to be released for 7 December 2005, and the name of the produced was revealed on 18 November. But in October, first photographies of the video circulated on the Internet and quickly disappeared after Farmer's wishes. On 6 December, the musical channels received the video but were not allowed to broadcast it immediately. Indeed, a trainee which participated in the video editing, made personal use of images and was sued and forced to pay €2 in fees. Some images of the video were shown at the end of television magazine Sept à Huit in which Farmer was interviewed and broadcast on 8 January 2006 on TF1. Finally, the video was fully broadcast for the first time on 11 January 2006 on NRJ 12, two months after the shooting. M6 refused to air the video after a disagreement with Farmer.

Very aesthetic, the music video was shot in the Ateliers du Louvre, Paris, and was produced by François Hanss. It features Farmer in a sculpture workshop. A statue which represents the singer is in the middle of this workshop and leaves a tear escape. Farmer sings in front of it, while a black cat appears and lies down next to the statue. One of the statues is a copy of a cadaver tomb by René de Chalon which can be seen in the Saint-Étienne church in Bar-le-Duc, and was reused in the 2009 Mylène Farmer en tournée tour. Royer believes that this video is a tribute to Paul Albert Gautier, the singer's grandfather, who devoted himself to sculpture; moreover, Farmer herself admitted having been attracted by this art. The video was the number three choice of voters viewing the TV music program Les 100 Meilleurs clips du XXIè siècle (The best videos of the twenty-first century), aired on MCM on 25 February 2007.

== Critical reception ==
According to journalist Déborah Laurent of La Dernière Minute, "we can sometimes think that, [in this song], the voice of [Farmer] will become inaudible as she plays with the limits of its fragility". Author Caroline Bee said the song "is not very rhythmic and is hardly memorizable".

In France, as most of the singer's singles, "Redonne-moi" debuted at its peak position in the top ten, at number seven, selling 10,731 units, on 7 January 2006. The next weeks, it dropped rather quickly and totaled only five weeks in the top 50 and eleven weeks on the chart. The single remains Farmer's shortest chart trajectory for one of her singles in the French top 100. In April 2006, when the Syndicat National de l'Édition Phonographique published the best-selling singles during the first quarter of 2006, "Redonne-moi" ranked at number 45. In Switzerland, the single hit number 27 in its second week, on the chart edition of 15 January, and stayed in the top 100 for a total of eight weeks. In Belgium (Wallonia), the single debuted at number 25 on 14 January and reached a peak of number six two weeks later, making it its highest position in all the countries it was released. It remained for eight weeks in the Ultratop 50.

== Promotion and live performances ==
Mylène Farmer performing "Redonne-moi" in Symphonic Show.

For the first time since "C'est une belle journée" in May 2002, Farmer accepted to perform a song in a television show, which was very rare. She decided to sing "Redonne-moi" on Symphonic Show on France 2, broadcast on 12 November 2005, although Farmer recorded her performance on 5 October without audience. Already in October, French television host Daniela Lumbroso announced in the media that Mylène Farmer would be present at the show. She also explained that for this occasion, the set was smoky and decorated with 200 candles, and that the recording of the performance lasted about 30 minutes. Farmer wore black trousers and a black blouse with a big crucifix as pendant. The song was performed in lip-sync and accompanied with a philharmonic orchestra named 'The Night of the Proms', composed of 140 musicians and choristers, and Yvan Cassar on piano. According to author Erwan Chuberre, this performance, though moving, was far from being unanimously appreciated.

The song was also performed on the 2006 Avant que l'ombre... à Bercy concert and was thus included on the live album Avant que l'ombre... à Bercy. According to a description by author Julien Rigal on his website and in his book, Farmer performed it alone in the middle of the cross-shaped stage. As she was overwhelmed by emotion, the audience sang the second refrain and at the end, she thanked it for its help.

== Formats and track listings ==
These are the formats and track listings of single releases of "Redonne-moi":

- CD single - Digipack - Limited edition (30,000)

No.	Title	Length
1.	"Redonne-moi"	4:24
2.	"Redonne-moi" (instrumental)	4:24

- Digital download

No.	Title	Length
1.	"Redonne-moi"	4:23
2.	"Redonne-moi" (instrumental)	4:23

- CD single - Promo / CD single - Promo - Luxury envelope - Limited edition (300)

No.	Title	Length
1.	"Redonne-moi" (radio edit)	4:02

- DVD - Promo

No.	Title	Length
1.	"Redonne-moi" (video)	4:22

== Official versions ==
Version	Length	Album	Year	Comment
Album/Single version	4:22	Avant que l'ombre...	2005	See the previous sections
Music video	4:22	Music Videos IV	2005	The video uses the album version
Radio edit	4:02	—	2005	This version is very similar to the album's one, but the introduction is shorter and a refrain is deleted before the musical bridge.
Instrumental	4:24	—	2005	All lyrics are deleted.
Live version (recorded in 2006)	5:44	Avant que l'ombre... à Bercy	2006	This performance is moving.

== Credits and personnel ==
These are the credits and the personnel as they appear on the back of the single:

- Mylène Farmer – lyrics
- Laurent Boutonnat – music
- Requiem Publishing – editions
- Polydor – recording company
- Ellen Von Unwerth – photo
- Henry Neu – design

== Charts and sales ==
Chart (2006)	Peak position
Belgian (Wallonia) Singles Chart	6
Eurochart Hot 100	29
French SNEP Singles Chart	7
Swiss Singles Chart	27

Country	Certification	Physical sales
France	—	35,000

== Release history ==
Region	Date	Format
France, Belgium, Switzerland	18 October 2005	Promo CD single
France, Belgium, Switzerland	December 2005	DVD
France, Belgium, Switzerland	2 January 2006	CD single
