= Avant que l'ombre... (song) =

Single by Mylène Farmer

from the album Avant que l'ombre... à Bercy
- B-side: "Album version"
- Released: 26 November 2006
- Recorded: 2005, France
- Genre: Dark wave
- Length: 3:57 (live single version); 7:26 (live album version); 3:53 (single version); 5:55 (album version)
- Label: Polydor
- Songwriters: Lyrics: Mylène Farmer; Music: Laurent Boutonnat
- Producer: Laurent Boutonnat

Mylène Farmer singles chronology
"Slipping Away (Crier la vie)" (2006)	"Avant que l'ombre..." (2006)	"Déshabillez-moi (live)" (2007)

Alternative cover
- CD single - Promo / MP3 - Promo

"Avant que l'ombre..." (English: "Before the Shadow...") is a song recorded by the French artist Mylène Farmer in a studio version in 2005 and in a live version at the time of her 2006 concerts at Bercy (Paris). It was the first single from her fourth live album, Avant que l'ombre... à Bercy, and was released on 26 November 2006. It achieved a moderate success in terms of sales, although it reached the top ten in France.

== Background and release ==
Many Internet sites announced "Déshabillez-moi" as the first single from the live album, but "Avant que l'ombre... (live)" was finally chosen. On 20 October, Jeune Reims was the first French radio to broadcast the song. Among the promotional media sent to radio stations, the MP3 contained an unreleased remix of the song "L'amour n'est rien...", the fourth single from the album Avant que l'ombre....

== Lyrics, music and video ==
"Avant que l'ombre..." is the most mystical song of the album of the same name, but also one in which the text is easier to understand. Speaking to Jesus Christ, the singer evokes her fear of death while affirming that the life has nevertheless allowed her to know love. This slow song ends with a long musical bridge "that looks like a final judgement". The music is sweet and the vocals symbolize screams of pain. According to author Erwan Chuberre, when the album was aired for the first time on 28 March 2005, "Avant que l'ombre..." was regarded as the best song of the album.

Directed by François Hanss, the music video was shot at one of her concerts in January 2006, and lasts over seven minutes as it contains all the ending musical bridge played while Farmer left the stage. The commercial ads were broadcast on radio station NRJ to announce the release of the video on M6 on 14 November 2006. However, NRJ 12 was finally the first channel to broadcast it earlier in the morning. As the video was rather long, the television channels quickly proposed a shorter version of the video. According to Jukebox magazine, the video enjoyed a cutting edge production, but some shots arrangements are somewhat clever, as they alternately show the singer with and without a microphone in hand.

== Chart performance ==
On the French Singles Chart established by the Syndicat National de l'Édition Phonographique, "Avant que l'ombre..." debuted at a peak of number ten on 2 December, selling 7,575 units that week, becoming thus Farmer's 32nd top ten hit in France. As the most of her previous singles, it dropped quickly and stayed for a total of eight weeks in the top 50 and 21 weeks in the top 100. Amongst her other live singles, only "La Poupée qui fait non", performed as duet with Khaled, and "Dessine-moi un mouton", achieved a better debut.

The single was not successful on the Swiss Singles Chart, where it ranked for two weeks with a peak at number 54 on 10 December. In Belgium (Wallonia), the single started at number 25, its highest placement, on 16 December, then dropped the next weeks, remaining on the chart for five weeks.

== Promotion and live performances ==
The song was never performed on television. Regardings concert tours, the song was performed as last song of the Avant que l'ombre... tour at Paris-Bercy in 2006. Farmer was then dressed in a kind of red kimono made by Franck Sorbier, embroidered with gold and stones. Near the end of the song, Farmer moved toward the staircase flanked by red torches, to leave the stage which was then separated from the audience by a curtain of water. When climbing, Farmer removed her coat and found herself in flesh-colored underwears, then turned to the audience to make a gesture of goodbye.

== Formats and track listings ==
These are the formats and track listings of single releases of "Avant que l'ombre...":

- CD single

No.	Title	Length
1.	"Avant que l'ombre..." (live version)	3:56
2.	"Avant que l'ombre..." (album version)	3:53

- Digital download

No.	Title	Length
1.	"Avant que l'ombre..." (edit radio)	3:56

- MP3 - Promo

No.	Title	Length
1.	"Avant que l'ombre..." (live - radio version)	3:56
2.	"Avant que l'ombre..." (radio version)	3:53
3.	"L'amour n'est rien..." (Patrice Strike & Teo Moss remix)	5:07

- CD single - Promo

No.	Title	Length
1.	"Avant que l'ombre..." (live version)	3:57
2.	"Avant que l'ombre..." (radio edit)	3:53

== Personnel ==
These are the credits and the personnel as they appear on the back of the single:

- Mylène Farmer — lyrics
- Laurent Boutonnat — music
- Requiem Publishing — editions
- Polydor — recording company
- Claude Gassian — photo
- Henry Neu — design
- Made in the E.U.

== Official versions ==
Version	Length	Album	Remixed by	Year	Comment
Album version	5:55	Avant que l'ombre...	—	2005	See the previous sections
Live album version (recorded in 2006)	7:26	Avant que l'ombre... à Bercy	—	2006	This version is similar to the album one (see Avant que l'ombre... à Bercy (tour))
Live single version	3:56	—	—	2006	The final musical bridge is deleted.
Radio edit	3:53	—	Laurent Boutonnat	2006	The final musical bridge is deleted.
Live version (recorded in 2009)	4:10	N°5 on Tour	—	2009	This instrumental version is used as an interlude.

== Charts and sales ==
Chart (2006)	Peak position
Belgian (Wallonia) Singles Chart	25
Eurochart Hot 100	38
French SNEP Singles Chart	10
Swiss Singles Chart	54

Country	Certification	Physical sales
France	—	30,000

== Release history ==
Region	Date	Format
France, Belgium, Switzerland	20 October 2006	Promo CD single
France, Belgium, Switzerland	27 November 2006	CD single
