= L'amour n'est rien... =

Single by Mylène Farmer

from the album Avant que l'ombre...
- B-side: Instrumental (CD single); Remixes (CD maxi)
- Released: 27 March 2006
- Recorded: 2005, France
- Genre: Pop rock, soft rock, trip hop
- Length: 5:03 (single version); 3:42 (radio edit)
- Label: Polydor
- Songwriters: Lyrics: Mylène Farmer; Music: Mylène Farmer, Laurent Boutonnat
- Producer: Laurent Boutonnat

Mylène Farmer singles chronology
"Redonne-moi" (2006)	"L'amour n'est rien..." (2006)	"Peut-être toi" (2006)

"L'amour n'est rien..." (English: "Love Is Nothing...") is a 2005 song recorded by French singer-songwriter Mylène Farmer. The song was released as the fourth single from Farmer's sixth studio album Avant que l'ombre... on 27 March 2006. "L'Amour n'est rien..." was illustrated by a music video which was perhaps one of the simplest in singer's career, and in which she performs a striptease. The song had some success in France, where it reached the top ten, but was especially successful in Russia where it was often aired on the radio.

== Background and writing ==
In the summer of 2005, this song was announced as the third single from Avant que l'ombre..., but "Redonne-moi" was chosen instead. Finally, "L'amour n'est rien..." was aired for the first time in a short version, the radio edit version, on NRJ on 24 January 2006, only three weeks after the release of "Redonne-moi". On 24 March, a remix with R&B sonorities, 'the sexually no remix', produced by The Bionix, was heard on the radio. On 11 April, the promotional CD maxi, then eight days later, the 7" maxi, were successively sent to radio stations.

As opposed to the other singles from Avant que l'ombre..., this song was regularly broadcast in its single version on many French radios such as MFM, Chérie FM and RFM, and also both in its radio edit and remix version on NRJ and Fun Radio.

The single's release was made in two times: first, the CD single on 27 March, then the CD maxi on which the remixes were available, on 7 May.

== Lyrics and music ==
"L'amour n'est rien..." is the only song from Avant que l'ombre... whose music was composed both by Mylène Farmer and Laurent Boutonnat. The music, the most cheerful and lively of the album with "Peut-être toi", was inspired by a free ditty which was also covered by Dorothée in her song "Hou! La Menteuse!". The lyrics seem to be autobiographical: Farmer evokes both her silent temperament and her thirst for sex and love. Unlike other Farmer's songs, "L'amour n'est rien..." is an optimistic song, in which "the singer kindly laughs at herself" and seems to address her critics who accuse her of being too pessimistic in her songs. At the end of the refrain, she answers that "she does not oblige others to adhere to her lifestyle". The song deals with "sex, religion and death", and uses various neologisms. It makes the "apology of a blossomed sexuality".

== Music video ==
Although Farmer is performing a complete striptease, the music video for "L'amour n'est rien..." was not censored on television.

Initially, Farmer did not want to illustrate this song with a video, but eventually accepted to make a few tests in a studio in Paris. The video was directed by Benoît di Sabatino, Farmer's then boyfriend, credited as M. Liberatore. It was first seen on 28 March on an official Universal website especially created for this occasion.

The video shows a smiling Farmer performing a complete striptease. However, she hides her breasts with her hands and only her buttocks are shown for a short time. Therefore, the video was not seen as erotic by the television channels which did not censor it. It sometimes received negative reviews for its lack of innovation. Many people saw in this video a sarcastic response to the photographers who had published a few time before unauthorised photos of Farmer when she was bathing naked on a private beach in the Seychelles.

It was the only time that one of Farmer's music videos was not only available on the singer's videos DVD (Music Videos IV), but also on a CD single.

== Promotion and live performances ==
"L'amour n'est rien" was never sung on television. It was performed on stage during the serie of concerts at Bercy in 2006. At this point, the sails of the stage were hauled to the top and illuminated in pink. Farmer wore a black top which she removed gradually while performing with a suggestive mouvement of the hips.

== Chart performances ==
As Farmer's all singles since "L'Âme-stram-gram", the single entered the French Single Chart in the top ten, at number seven, on 1 April 2006, selling 12,932 units (only CD single was released then). The next four weeks, the single dropped but on 6 May, it climbed from number 33 to number ten with 7,139 sales, as the CD maxi was then released. Thereafter, it fall rather quickly, staying for ten weeks in the top 50 and 18 weeks in the top 100. In April 2006, the SNEP revealed the best-selling singles during the first quarter of 2006 and, despite being released four days before this period ended, the single managed to peak at number 86. Later, in December 2006, the SNEP published the best-selling singles of the first nine months of 2006, and "L'amour n'est rien..." was ranked number 69. The single was finally the 92nd best-selling single in 2006.

In Belgium, the single debuted at number 15 on 8 April and reached a peak of number nine the next week. It fell off the chart (top 40) after 13 weeks. The song peaked at number 59 in the 2006 Belgian singles year-end chart. In Switzerland, the single started at number 52 on 9 May and dropped, but in the sixth week, it climbed from number 90 to a peak at number 47 because of the release of the CD maxi and the vinyl. Then the single dropped again and remained in the top 100 for a total of ten weeks.

"L'amour n'est rien..." had great success on various French airplay charts : it peaked at number 33 both on airplay chart and the television airplay chart. In Russia, the song was much broadcast on radio and, in 2007, was even the most aired song of the year in Russia.

== Formats and track listings ==
These are the formats and track listings of single releases of "L'amour n'est rien...":

- CD single - Digipack - Limited edition

No.	Title	Length
1.	"L'amour n'est rien..." (single version)	5:03
2.	"L'amour n'est rien..." (instrumental)	5:03

- CD maxi - Digipack - Limited edition

No.	Title	Length
1.	"L'amour n'est rien..." (single version)	5:03
2.	"L'amour n'est rien..." (the sexually no remix)	3:30
3.	"L'amour n'est rien..." (obsessed club mix)	5:47
4.	"L'amour n'est rien..." (video)	3:40

- Digital download

No.	Title	Length
1.	"L'amour n'est rien..." (single version)	5:03
2.	"L'amour n'est rien..." (the sexually no remix)	3:30
3.	"L'amour n'est rien..." (obsessed club mix)	5:47
4.	"L'amour n'est rien..." (2006 live version)	5:05

- CD single - Promo

No.	Title	Length
1.	"L'amour n'est rien..." (radio edit)	3:42

- CD maxi - Promo

No.	Title	Length
1.	"L'amour n'est rien..." (the sexually no remix)	3:30

- 12" maxi - Promo

No.	Title	Length
1.	"L'amour n'est rien..." (obsessed club mix)	5:47
2.	"L'amour n'est rien..." (the sexually no remix)	3:30
3.	"L'amour n'est rien..." (single version)	5:03

- DVD - Promo

No.	Title	Length
1.	"L'amour n'est rien..." (video)	3:40

== Release history ==
Date	Label	Region	Format	Catalog
February 2006	Polydor	France, Belgium, Switzerland	CD single - Promo	11 043
27 March 2006	Polydor	France, Belgium, Switzerland	CD single	983 849-2
April 2006	Polydor	France, Belgium, Switzerland	7" maxi - Promo	11 135
April 2006	Polydor	France, Belgium, Switzerland	CD single - Promo	—
April 2006	Polydor	France, Belgium, Switzerland	VHS - Promo	—
2 May 2006	Polydor	France, Belgium, Switzerland	CD maxi	983 941-8

== Official versions ==
Version	Length	Album	Remixed by	Year	Comment
Single / Album version	5:03	Avant que l'ombre...	—	2005	See the previous sections
Radio edit	3:40	—	Laurent Boutonnat	2006	The musical bridge and a refrain are deleted.
Instrumental	5:03	—	Laurent Boutonnat	2006	This instrumental version is the same as the album one, but without lyrics and vocal backgrounds.
The sexually no remix	3:30	—	The Bionix	2006	This is a remix with R&B sonorities.
Obsessed club mix	5:47	—	Fat Phaze	2006	
Music video	3:40	Music Videos IV	—	2006	
Patrice Strike & Teo Moss remix	5:04	—	Patrice Strike and Teo Moss	2006	This version is only available on the promotional MP3 of "Avant que l'ombre...".
Live version (recorded in 2006)	4:59 (video); 5:05 (audio)	Avant que l'ombre... à Bercy	—	2006	See Avant que l'ombre... à Bercy (tour)

== Credits and personnel ==
These are the credits and the personnel as they appear on the back of the single:

- Mylène Farmer – lyrics, music
- Laurent Boutonnat – music
- Requiem Publishing – editions
- Polydor – recording company
- Dominique Issermann – photo
- Henry Neu – design

== Charts and sales ==
=== Weekly charts ===
Weekly chart performance for "L'amour n'est rien..."
Chart (2006)	Peak position
Belgium (Ultratop 50 Wallonia)	9
CIS Airplay (TopHit)	4
Eurochart Hot 100	25
France (SNEP)	7
France Airplay (SNEP)	33
Russia Airplay (TopHit)	3
Switzerland (Schweizer Hitparade)	47

=== Year-end charts ===
Year-end chart performance for "L'amour n'est rien..."
Chart (2006)	Position
Belgium (Ultratop 50 Wallonia)	59
CIS (TopHit)	10
France (SNEP)	92
Russia Airplay (TopHit)	4

=== Decade-end charts ===
Decade-end chart performance for "L'amour n'est rien..."
Chart (2000–2009)	Position
Russia Airplay (TopHit)	45

=== Sales ===
Country	Certification	Physical sales
France	—	60,000
