= Avant que l'ombre... =

Studio album by Mylène Farmer
- Released: 4 April 2005
- Recorded: 2004–2005
- Studio: Studio Guillaume Tell (Suresnes)
- Genres: Synthpop; pop rock
- Length: 71:01
- Label: Polydor
- Producer: Laurent Boutonnat

Mylène Farmer chronology
RemixeS (2003)	Avant que l'ombre... (2005)	Avant que l'ombre... à Bercy (2006)

Alternate cover
- Collector edition

Singles from Avant que l'ombre...
- 1. "Fuck Them All" Released: 14 March 2005; 2. "Q.I" Released: 4 July 2005; 3. "Redonne-moi" Released: 2 January 2006; 4. "L'amour n'est rien..." Released: 27 March 2006; 5. "Peut-être toi" Released: 21 August 2006

Avant que l'ombre... (English: Before the Shadow) is the sixth studio album by French pop singer-songwriter Mylène Farmer, released on 4 April 2005, through the label Polydor. Lyrics were written by Mylene herself and production was supervised by Laurent Boutonnat. The albums' genres mainly consist of synth-pop, french-pop, gothic-pop, electronic and pop rock. The album deals with overt themes and lyrics of love, spirituality, faith, identity, self-reflection, and solitude.

Upon release, the album did well commercially; however, its critical reception varies from many mixed reviews. The album debuted at number one on the French Albums Chart and held the top spot for several weeks. It was certified diamond in France by the SNEP (Syndicat National de l'Édition Phonographique), signifying over 750,000 copies sold, and eventually exceeded 1 million sales worldwide. The album also charted in Belgium (Wallonia) and Switzerland, reinforcing Farmer's strong presence in Francophone countries. Despite its relatively introspective tone and slower tempo compared to her earlier, more dance-oriented works, it resonated deeply with fans. Critics gave the album mixed to positive reviews, with praise for its lyrical depth, polished production, and Farmer's haunting vocal style. The project also gained attention due to its elaborate promotion, including the announcement of a highly anticipated concert residency at Paris-Bercy, her first live performances since 1996.

The album produced five singles, each achieving notable chart success in France and other Francophone regions. The lead single, "Fuck Them All" debuted at number two on the French Singles Chart and was certified silver in France. "Q.I" the second single, reached number seven in France and was the most broadcast French-language song worldwide in 2005. The third single, "Redonne-moi" a slow ballad, peaked at number seven in France. "L'amour n'est rien..." achieved significant success in France, peaking at number seven, and was notably one of the most played songs in Russia in 2006. The final single, "Peut-être toi" reached number three in France and featured an anime-style music video directed by Naoko Kusumi, which was selected for competition at the Anima Mundi International Animation Festival. Collectively, these singles reinforced Farmer's enduring popularity and showcased her willingness to experiment with diverse musical and visual styles.

== Background and release ==
Avant que l'ombre... je sais, ne s'abatte à mes pieds
Je sais que, je sais que... j'ai aimé

— Refrain from "Avant que l'ombre..." that appears on the digipack

"Avant que l'ombre" marked Farmer's longest break between studio albums, following "Innamoramento" by exactly six years. As such, the album was, perhaps, the most anticipated of her career. Rumours of the disc began circulating in 2003 when it was revealed that Universal was planning a new release of Farmer for the fourth quarter; however the project turned out to be Farmer's second remix album. By the end of 2004, Universal's President Pascal Nègre confirmed that Farmer would release an album in the following months, stating then that it would be a double album. Persistent rumours continued to circulate including the possibility of duets with artists such as Benjamin Biolay, Diam's and Lara Fabian.

In December 2004, Farmer held a major press conference with longtime collaborator Laurent Boutonnat in which she confirmed the upcoming release of the album, including the title, and announced a series of concerts to coincide at Paris Bercy. After several postponements, the album's release was pinned for 4 April 2005. Contrary to Nègre's previous comments, the album was a single disc with 14 titles, which remains the largest number of songs on a Farmer album, and an additional hidden track entitled "Nobody Knows". On this album, Farmer abandoned the American musicians who had previously worked with her since Anamorphosée, and reunited with several musicians with whom she had worked in her early career.

The digipack version, first limited to 2,000 units, is composed of the CD and a DVD containing the making-of of the music video for "Fuck Them All" with commentaries by director Augustin Villaronga. The album was produced in a triptych version, with a central section that unfolds itself in the shape of a cross to discover the booklet in which the order of the lyrics is not the same as that of the songs. The refrain's lyrics of the eponymous song is put forward within the digipack. The various photographs of the booklet were directed by Dominique Isserman, and cost about 85,000 euros. Isserman also made the cover's photo, on which Farmer appears lengthened, "asleep as Sleeping Beauty on an ochre and shades of red background". Around the neck, she is wearing a cross made with two matches.

On 28 March, a competition organized by the NRJ radio allowed the winners to listen to the album in its entirety alongside Pascal Nègre and Mylène Farmer. The Virgin megastore and the Fnac ot the Champs Elysées also organized a special deal with album's sales after midnight. The album was released twice: first on 4 April in the collector version, and then on 18 April in the traditional version for the general public.

The album was supported by a series of 13 concerts at Paris-Bercy in January 2006.

== Lyrics and music ==
According to Laurent Boutonnat, Avant que l'ombre... is more acoustic and electronic than the previous ones he had produced. A newspaper said: "The style is the same, but the sounds evolve: more acoustic sounds mixed with electro and keyboards. Farmer sings with a voice more natural than usual". Ouest France stated that the album is "a continuation of the singer's discography", but with a "certain calm in the prose" and a "majority of ballads". In this album, Farmer's voice is "filled with softness and fragility". For one of the first time, she sings in low notes.

On this album, "Boutonnat opens his production to new instruments": the clarinet (on "Redonne-moi") and the vibraphone (on "Avant que l'ombre...").

The album deals with the "apprehension of a woman facing the death with after all the satisfaction to have loved". It mainly talks of sex, death and religion. The lyrics are "slightly disturbing", "sometimes important", and there is some "humor". About the album content, Farmer said: "I very selfishly continue to talk about me, my shadows, my lights".

== Critical reception ==
Professional ratings
Review scores
Source	Rating
AllMusic	4/5 stars

The journalist Benoît Cachin considered that Avant que l'ombre... was less sophisticated than Farmer's previous albums. He said that among the subjects tackled are religion, literature, sexuality, a hope for a better life, a happy love, revolt, dream and self-mockery. Although he deemed the album "consistent and uniform", he added that it is confusing due to the "particularly abstruse" lyrics, including many puns and literary references unknown to the general public.

Some critics thought the album did not contain any big surprises: "Farmer's voice is still light, fragile, sometimes quavering" to better evoke emotion. The piano gives the tempo but the strings dominate to create "a labyrinthine atmosphere". Caroline Bee believes that the album is too similar to the previous ones and lacks innovation. The album is a "distressing repetition of her old hits" (Actu02). "Disappointing", with "ethereal chords", "songs stretched and similar" (Télé Star). "Her album is not revolutionary. (...) Certain chords are even fuddy-duddy. (...) A mixed success" (Télé 2 Semaines). "Nothing is very surprising nor really new. Always this voice on the wire, at the edge of the crack. Always this dark romanticism bathed in mystical, erotic, and morbid image more or less woolly" (Le Journal du dimanche).

According to Rolling Stone, this album has a "great sweetness" but "ultimately suffers from a major flaw: it is the sixth album of an artist from whom everyone expects too much". On the whole, the album was well received in the media, particularly by the French newspaper Le Monde which stated: "The singularity of the musical and thematic universe of Mylène Farmer, is not overturned, but refined. (...) The whole aims to a luminous power. (...) [In the lyrics], Mylène Farmer is calmer, almost beaming, melancholy with a smile". Voici qualified Avant que l'ombre... as an "intimate album" and underlined the "quality of the lyrics".

The album was rewarded with the title "Best Album of the Year" in 2005 at NRJ Music Awards.

== Commercial performance ==
In France, Avant que l'ombre... became the singer's fifth number-one album, debuting atop the French Albums Chart with nearly 150,000 (Gold) units sold in the first week. Although Farmer did not promote the album, it remained at number one for three non-consecutive weeks, alternating with Grégory Lemarchal's album, Je deviens moi. Avant que l'ombre... logged in more than two months in the top ten, and 23 consecutive weeks in the top 50 before sliding down the chart later in autumn, which partially resulted from the six-month difference between the release of the second and the third singles. It re-entered in the top 20 in January after an intense advertising campaign, an interview on TF1 and the concerts at Bercy. The album ultimately logged a total of 77 weeks on the album chart. In spite of a good chart trajectory, the album did not reach the sales of Farmer's previous studio albums, which were all million plus sellers in France. The album was certified Platinum, then Double platinum on 6 July 2006. It was the eighth best-selling album of 2005 in France.

In Belgium (Wallonia), the album also debuted at number one on 16 April and remained there for six consecutive before being dislodged by Raphaël's Caravane. The album remained in the top ten for fourteen consecutive weeks. As in France, the album experienced a resurgence, thought less pronounced, in early 2006. The album logged a total of 31 non-consecutive weeks on the Belgium album chart and was certified Gold album. The album ranked number five on the 2005 year-end chart.

In Switzerland, the album debuted at number two on 17 April, then dropped quickly and fell off the top 100 after 11 weeks.

In non-Francophone Belgium (Flanders), the album had a peak at number 48 on 23 April 2005.

== Track listing ==
No.	Title	Lyrics	Music	Live performance	Length
1.	"Avant que l'ombre..."	Mylène Farmer	Laurent Boutonnat	Avant que l'ombre... à Bercy; 2009 tour	5:55
2.	"Fuck Them All"	Mylène Farmer	Laurent Boutonnat	Avant que l'ombre... à Bercy; 2009 tour Live 2019	4:32
3.	"Dans les rues de Londres"	Mylène Farmer	Laurent Boutonnat	Avant que l'ombre... à Bercy	3:50
4.	"Q.I"	Mylène Farmer	Laurent Boutonnat	Avant que l'ombre... à Bercy	5:20
5.	"Redonne-moi"	Mylène Farmer	Laurent Boutonnat	Symphonic Show (France 2), 12 November 2005; Avant que l'ombre... à Bercy	4:22
6.	"Porno graphique"	Mylène Farmer	Laurent Boutonnat	Avant que l'ombre... à Bercy	4:16
7.	"Derrière les fenêtres"	Mylène Farmer	Laurent Boutonnat		4:02
8.	"Aime"	Mylène Farmer	Laurent Boutonnat		4:32
9.	"Tous ces combats"	Mylène Farmer	Laurent Boutonnat		4:00
10.	"Ange, parle-moi"	Mylène Farmer	Laurent Boutonnat	Avant que l'ombre... à Bercy	3:40
11.	"L'amour n'est rien..."	Mylène Farmer	Laurent Boutonnat; Mylène Farmer	Avant que l'ombre... à Bercy	5:03
12.	"J'attends"	Mylène Farmer	Laurent Boutonnat		5:20
13.	"Peut-être toi"	Mylène Farmer	Laurent Boutonnat	Avant que l'ombre... à Bercy; Nevermore 2023/2024	4:45
14.	"Et pourtant"	Mylène Farmer	Laurent Boutonnat	Timeless 2013	4:35
15.	"Nobody Knows" (hidden track)	Mylène Farmer	Laurent Boutonnat	Avant que l'ombre... à Bercy	4:43

== Charts ==
=== Weekly charts ===
Initial weekly chart performance for Avant que l'ombre...
Chart (2005)	Peak position
Belgian Albums (Ultratop Flanders)	48
Belgian Albums (Ultratop Wallonia)	1
European Albums (Billboard)	14
French Albums (SNEP)	1
Swiss Albums (Schweizer Hitparade)	2
Greek Global Albums	32
Greek International Albums	5

2021 weekly chart performance for Avant que l'ombre...
Chart (2021)	Peak position
Belgian Albums (Ultratop Wallonia)	4
Swiss Albums (Schweizer Hitparade)	19
Swiss Albums (Gfk Romandy)	5

=== Year-end charts ===
2005 year-end chart performance for Avant que l'ombre...
Chart (2005)	Position
Belgian Albums (Ultratop Wallonia)	5
French Albums (SNEP)	8

2006 year-end chart performance for Avant que l'ombre...
Chart (2006)	Position
French Albums (SNEP)	105

2021 year-end chart performance for Avant que l'ombre...
Chart (2021)	Position
Belgian Albums (Ultratop Wallonia)	195

== Certifications and sales ==
Region	Certification	Certified units/sales
Belgium (BRMA)	Gold	25,000^{*}
France (SNEP)	2× Platinum	400,000^{*}
Russia (NFPF)	Platinum	20,000^{*}
Summaries
Worldwide	—	800,000
^{*} Sales figures based on certification alone.

== Credits ==
CD

- Words: Mylène Farmer
- Music: Laurent Boutonnat
  - Except "L'amour n'est rien..." : Music: Laurent Boutonnat & Mylène Farmer
- Produced by Laurent Boutonnat
- Mixed by Jérôme Devoise
- Sound:Jérôme Devoise
- Programmation, keyboards, arrangement: Laurent Boutonnat
- Guitars: Philippe Paradis
  - Except "Ange, parle-moi" and "Et Pourtant..." : Jean-Marie Ecay
- Bass: Philippe Chayed
- Drums: Loïc Pontieux
- Piano ("Ange, parle-moi" and "Et Pourtant...") : Yvan Cassar
- Cello ("Derrière les fenêtres") : Jean-Philippe Audin
- Clarinet ("Redonne-moi") : Jérôme Devoise
- Percussion and xylophone: Pol Ramirez del Piu

- Strings arrangement: Jean-Jacques Charles and Graham Preskett
- Vocals: Mylène Farmer
- Studio: Guillaume Tell
- Assistant: Tristan Monrocq
- Mastering: André Perriat and Bruno Gruel for Top Master
- Management: Thierry Suc for TS3
- Executive production: Paul van Parys for Stuffey Monkey
- Assistant of Mylène Farmer: Brigitte Gautier
- Assistant of Laurent Boutonnat: Emiline Chetaud
- Administration: Corinne Potier
- Photos: Dominique Issermann
- Design: Henry Neu for Com'N.B

DVD "Fuck Them All"

- Video directed by Agustin Villaronga
- Making of by: François Hanss
- Produced by: Stuffed Monkey

== Formats ==
- CD
- CD — Digipack ^{1}
- Collector casket — Format 12" - Limited edition (5,000) ^{1}
- Double 12" ^{2}
- CD — Taïwan
- CD — Japan ^{3}
- CD — Promo — Japan ^{4}
- Cassette ^{5}

^{1} + 1 DVD containing the video and the making of of "Fuck Them All"
^{2} Near the centering of one of the two vinyls is engraved the phrase "Quel talent Lolo, vingt ans après", in reference to Laurent Boutonnat
^{3} "Nobody Knows" features as 15th track and its lyrics are available in the booklet
^{4} "Nobody Knows" features as 15th track
^{5} Not contains "Nobody Knows"
