= Music Videos II & III =

Music Video II & III

Video by Mylène Farmer
- Released: March 2001
- Recorded: 1992–2000
- Genre: Compilation
- Label: Polydor

Mylène Farmer chronology
| Mylenium Tour (2000) | Music Video II & III (2001) | Music Videos I, II & III (2001) |

Professional ratings
Review scores
| Source | Rating |
|---|---|
| DVDfr | 5/5 stars |

Music Video II & III is a DVD recorded by the French singer Mylène Farmer, containing all the singer's videoclips from 1992 to 2000. It was released in March 2001 in France.

The DVD contains all the videos from the studio albums Anamorphosée and Innamoramento and the live album Live à Bercy, as well as the video "Que mon cœur lâche". This DVD was more sold than the previous one, Music Videos I, made by Laurent Boutonnat, and remains one of the most best-selling musical DVD today in France. The cover refers both to a scene from "XXL" and the cover of the CD maxi "L'Âme-stram-gram".

According to DVDfr.com, "a very good job was made on the cover and the booklet". Images are "impeccable" and the sound "is dynamic, full of feelings and basses".

== Formats ==
This video is available only on DVD.

== Track listings ==
| No | Video | From album | Year | Length |
|---|---|---|---|---|
| 1 | "Que mon cœur lâche" | Dance Remixes | 1992 | 6:44 |
| 2 | "XXL" | Anamorphosée | 1995 | 4:34 |
| 3 | "L'Instant X" | Anamorphosée | 1995 | 4:22 |
| 4 | "California" | Anamorphosée | 1996 | 5:18 |
| 5 | "Comme j'ai mal" | Anamorphosée | 1996 | 4:00 |
| 6 | "L'Âme-stram-gram" | Innamoramento | 1999 | 7:50 |
| 7 | "Je te rends ton amour" | Innamoramento | 1999 | 5:08 |
| 8 | "Souviens-toi du jour" | Innamoramento | 1999 | 5:07 |
| 9 | "Optimistique-moi" | Innamoramento | 2000 | 4:25 |
| 10 | "Innamoramento" | Innamoramento | 2000 | 5:52 |
| 11 | "Ainsi soit je..." | Live à Bercy | 1997 | 5:04 |
| 12 | "La Poupée qui fait non" (live, duet with Khaled) | Live à Bercy | 1997 | 4:30 |
| 13 | "Rêver" | Anamorphosée | 1996 | 6:05 |

+ Backstage of the videos of "California" and "L'Âme-stram-gram" + Report "MF Confidential" (11:32).

== Credits and personnel ==
- "Que mon cœur lâche": Produced by Luc Besson
- "XXL", "L'Instant X", "Comme j'ai mal", "Souviens-toi du jour": Produced by Marcus Niespel
- "California": Produced by Abel Ferrara
- "L'Âme-stram-gram": Produced by Ching Siu Tung
- "Je te rends ton amour", "Innamoramento": Produced by François Hanss
- "Optimistique-moi": Produced by Michael Haussman
- "Ainsi soit je...", "La Poupée qui fait non", "Rêver" : Produced by Laurent Boutonnat and François Hanss

== Certifications and sales ==
| Region | Certification | Certified units/sales |
|---|---|---|
| France (SNEP) | Diamond | 100,000^{*} |
^{*} Sales figures based on certification alone.

== Charts ==
| Chart (2003) | Peak position |
|---|---|
| French Videos Chart ^{1} | 21 |

^{1} The French Videos Chart started on 4 October 2003. This video album was probably ranked higher before.
