= Music Videos III =

Music Video III

Video by Mylène Farmer
- Released: November 2000
- Recorded: 1999–2000
- Genre: Compilation
- Label: Polydor

Mylène Farmer chronology
Live à Bercy (1997)	Music Video III (2000)	Mylenium Tour (2000)

Music Videos III is a VHS recorded by the French singer Mylène Farmer, containing all the singer's videoclips from 1999 to 2000. It was released in November 2000 in France.

This VHS includes all videos from the album Innamoramento, particularly the censored video "Je te rends ton amour". It was the first participation of two directors for Farmer: Ching Siu Tung for "L'Âme-stram-gram" and Michael Haussman for "Optimistique-moi", which gained the M6 Award for best video in 2000.

The VHS cover is an image from the video for "Optimistique-moi", when Farmer is locked in the box of the magician.

Music Videos III was the less-selling video from the collection Music Videos.

== Formats ==
This video is available only on VHS.

== Track listings ==
No	Video	From album	Year	Length
1	"L'Âme-stram-gram"	Innamoramento	1999	7:50
2	"Je te rends ton amour"	Innamoramento	1999	5:08
3	"Souviens-toi du jour"	Innamoramento	1999	5:07
4	"Optimistique-moi"	Innamoramento	2000	4:25
5	"Innamoramento"	Innamoramento	2000	5:52

+ Backstage of the video "L'Âme-stram-gram" (18:19).

== Credits and personnel ==
- "L'Âme-stram-gram": Produced by Ching Siu Tung
- "Je te rends ton amour", "Innamoramento": Produced by François Hanss
- "Optimistique-moi": Produced by Michael Haussman
- "Souviens-toi du jour": Produced by Marcus Niespel
