= Remixes (Mylène Farmer album) =

RemixeS

Remix album by Mylène Farmer
- Released: December 2003
- Genres: Electronic, dance
- Length: 65:55
- Label: Polydor
- Producer: Laurent Boutonnat

Mylène Farmer chronology
Les Mots (2001)	RemixeS (2003)	Avant que l'ombre... (2005)

Singles from RemixeS
- 1. "Sans contrefaçon" Released: August 2003; 2. "Je t'aime mélancolie" Released: November 2003; 3. "L'Instant X" Released: January 2004

Remixes (stylized as RemixeS) is a compilation of French singer Mylène Farmer's singles by various famous DJs, including JXL, Felix Da Housecat and Paul Oakenfold.

== Background, writing and release ==
During the summer of 2001, it was rumoured that Farmer and her associates were preparing a new album of remixes, itself of interest as it followed the previous remix album Dance Remixes by ten years. Universal decided to produce a CD with 11 remixes produced by French and international famous DJs and remixers. The album was officially announced in July 2003, to be entirely composed of original remixes, an idea not entirely appreciated by all Farmer's fans: some thought that the old hits should not be remixed, while others found that the idea of remixing Farmer's successes by the most famous DJs was brilliant.

In fact, this album is not really a compilation, as although the original versions were already released as singles the remixes were, in general, then unknown to the public. The artistic direction of this album was given to Paul Van Parys, Jerome Devoise and Henry Neu. It was produced at Studios Guillaume Tell, which had already been used for the remix of "C'est une belle journée", by Devil Head. Farmer asked her sister, Brigitte Gautier, to design the cover, which she produced using a photo from a 2001 book about Farmer, recolouring it to fit the theme. While the whole was produced by Polydor, the record labels Stuffed Monkey and Requiem Publishing didn't participate in this album.

The very first run of this album was slightly high, with just 200,000 copies. It was originally planned that the album is marketed throughout Europe, the United States and Canada.

Other remixes had been originally planned, but have not featured on the album: "Sans contrefaçon" and "Pourvu qu'elles soient douces" by Jaïa and Gabriel Masurel (Blue Planet Corporation), "Maman a tort" by Joachim Garraud, and a remix of "Vertige".

== Critical reception ==
Professional ratings
Review scores
Source	Rating
Fnac	5/10 stars
Amazon.fr	3.5/5 stars

Remixes was not generally well received in the media. For example, the journalist Caroline Bee said that despite the great DJs solicited on this occasion, "the whole struggles to convince". The French magazine Femme Actuelle considered that this album of remixes was "disappointing".

== Singles ==
There were three songs released as singles : first, in August 2003 - four months before the release of the album -, "Sans contrefaçon" (J.C.A. Remix), which was much aired on radio and was a hit in the nightclubs; then, in November, "Je t'aime mélancolie" (Felix Da Housecat Remix); and in January 2004, "L'Instant X" (The X Key Mix by One-T). There was no fourth single although it was originally scheduled. The three singles were released as 12"-Maxi, with which added the promotional CD and vinyls. Sales of these singles were very confidential, since they were released only as vinyls.

== Commercial performance ==
In France, the album debuted at #3 on Top compilation on 6 December 2003, but fell to #11 the week after. However, it managed to reach again the top 10 for two other weeks, respectively at #10 and #9. It stayed on the chart (Top 40) for a total of 11 weeks. The same year, the album was certified Gold album by the SNEP for a minimum of 100,000 copies sold.

In Belgian (Wallonia) Albums Chart, Remixes started to #24 on 13 December 2003, before climbing to its highest position, #15, the following week. After that, it dropped to number 35 and had an irregular trajectory in the low positions. It left the chart after nine weeks of attendance.

In Switzerland, the album made a short appearance at #81 on the chart on 14 December 2003, before leaving it.

On 20 March 2005, the album entered the Top Mid' Price (France) for four weeks, peaking at #10 in its third week.

== Track listing ==
Remixes track listing
No.	Title	Lyrics	Music	Original album	Length
1.	"Sans contrefaçon" (J.C.A. remix)	Mylène Farmer	Laurent Boutonnat	Ainsi soit je...	5:52
2.	"L'Instant X" (The X Key Mix by One-T)	Farmer	Boutonnat	Anamorphosée	3:39
3.	"L'Âme-stram-gram" (Full Intention Sultra mix)	Farmer	Boutonnat	Innamoramento	7:57
4.	"C'est une belle journée" (Devil Head remix)	Farmer	Boutonnat	Les Mots	5:10
5.	"XXL" (Junkie XL remix)	Farmer	Boutonnat	Anamorphosée	6:06
6.	"Je t'aime mélancolie" (Felix da Housecat remix)	Farmer	Boutonnat	L'autre...	4:45
7.	"Pourvu qu'elles soient douces" (Paul Oakenfold remix)	Farmer	Boutonnat	Ainsi soit je...	4:03
8.	"California" (Romain Tranchart & Rawman remix)	Farmer	Boutonnat	Anamorphosée	6:17
9.	"Libertine" (Y-Front remix)	Boutonnat	Jean-Claude Dequéant	Cendres de lune	4:02
10.	"Optimistique-moi" (Junior Jack Psycho vocal mix)	Farmer	Farmer	Innamoramento	8:00
11.	"Désenchantée" (Thunderpuss Club Anthem)	Farmer	Boutonnat	L'autre...	10:04

== Credits ==
- Text : Mylène Farmer
  - Except : "Libertine" : Laurent Boutonnat
- Music : Laurent Boutonnat
  - Except : "Libertine" : Jean-Claude Déquéant; "Optimistique-moi" : Mylène Farmer
- Editions : Requiem Publishing
  - Except : "Sans contrefaçon", "Pourvu qu'elles soient douces" and "Libertine" : Universal Music Publishing / BMG Music Publishing France
- Record label : Polydor
- Artistic direction : Romain Bilharz and Paul Van Parys
- Production : Lionel Grosheny, with Damien Fischetti
- Mastered at Top Master, by André Perriat and Bruno Gruel
- Photography : Ellen Von Unwerth / H§K
- Design : Brigitte Gautier
- Execution : Henry Neu for Com' N.B

== Charts ==
Chart (2003)	Peak position
Belgian Albums (Ultratop Wallonia)	15
French Compilations (SNEP)	3
Swiss Albums (Schweizer Hitparade)	81
Greek Albums (IFPI)	20

== Certifications and sales ==
Region	Certification	Certified units/sales
France (SNEP)	Gold	100,000^{*}
^{*} Sales figures based on certification alone.

== Formats ==
- CD - Digipack - France
- CD - Crystal case - France
- LP (limited édition, 5000 copy) - France
- Cassette - France
- CD - Republic of China
