= Innamoramento (song) =

Single by Mylène Farmer

from the album Innamoramento
- B-side: "Remix"
- Released: 18 July 2000
- Recorded: 1999, France
- Genre: Soft rock
- Length: 4:50 (single version); 5:27 (album version)
- Label: Polydor
- Songwriters: Lyrics: Mylène Farmer; Music: Laurent Boutonnat
- Producer: Laurent Boutonnat

Mylène Farmer singles chronology
"Optimistique-moi" (2000)	"Innamoramento" (2000)	"Dessine-moi un mouton" (2000)

Alternative cover
- CD maxi

Music video
- "Innamoramento" on YouTube

"Innamoramento" is a 1999 song recorded by French singer-songwriter Mylène Farmer. It was the fifth single from her fifth studio album, Innamoramento, and was released on 18 July 2000. This pop ballad was written by Farmer with the music composed by Laurent Boutonnat. Lyrically, the song is about the need of love, and was accompanied by a music video directed by François Hanss which displays alternatively images of the singer on stage during her 1999 tour and in the Bois de Vincennes. "Innamoramento" received positive reviews from critics who generally praised the quality of the remixes and the concept of the music video. The song became Farmer's 20th top ten hit in France, reaching number three in the first week of release; however, the song was the less-selling single from the album.

== Release ==
In June 2000, a luxurious cardboard cube was sent to the radio stations. Then, after many several postponements, the single was eventually released on 18 July 2000. There were two issues of the CD single "Innamoramento": the main one which contains a white disc, and the collector format printed in a limited edition which presents a picture CD. As both editions had the same cover, some fans bought several copies to obtain each kind of edition, which helped to increase the sales.

== Lyrics ==
The song's title, which is the same as its parent album, is based on a Francesco Alberoni book, Le Choc amoureux, meaning Innamoramento in Italian and s'énamourer in Old French. Farmer explained that the song is about the fact of loving "in its larger spectrum". Journalist Benoît Cachin said the song deals with the themes of rebirth, love, and the questions that they raise. According to psychologist Hugues Royer, the song is "like the call of a solitude that wants to be broken".

== Music video ==
The screenplay of the music video was written by Mylène Farmer. It was directed by François Hanss and produced by Requiem Publishing and Stuffed Monkey, with a budget of about 30,000 euros. Shot in two days in the Bois de Vincennes, it alternately shows Farmer wearing a long white dress, without makeup, lying on the grass, and images recorded during the concert "Mylenium Tour". The video ends with a close-up of Farmer.

According to Instant-Mag, the video shows roughly "the same visual as the first one from Live à Bercy (i.e. "Rêver") and seems to be a little repetitive. Indeed, there is "a blue and hushed atmosphere, a light and airy dress, a very present audience. The succession of images and the choice of camera angles (wide shots, overviews, zooms) show her desire for the stage and follow the same way, reinforcing the sense of déjà-vu (...). The whole is still saved by the insertion of country images, adding a personal touch." In spite of these criticisms, another issue of the magazine said that "the concept of the video was well-conceived and beautifully filmed".

== Promotion and live performances ==
Farmer did not promote "Innamoramento" which was poorly broadcast on radio at the time. It was only sung during the 1999 Mylenium Tour, being the last song of the show. Farmer wore then a transparent white dress with a plunging neckline in the back, a sailing on the shoulders, shoes with high heels, and a large white necklace. The final refrain is sung four times, instead of two in the album version, in chorus with the audience, then Farmer went into the statue's hand.

== Critical reception ==
The song generally enjoyed positive reviews from critics. Belgian newspaper La Dernière Heure described the song as being "pleasant, but not surprisingly, [with] a silky melody, twin of "Ainsi soit je..."". However, the covers of the various formats and the remixes were criticized. Gathering the various ideas expressed on the Internet on the matter, Instant-Mag said the picture of the CD single is a bit blurred and does not show Farmer clearly, and regarding the CD maxi, it stated that "the neo-cube assembly of the cover, which wants to be creative, falls completely flat. Colour selection suffers from the most complete tastelessness and the play of geometric shapes absorbs all the visuals". Regarding the remixes, author Erwan Chuberre considered these accelerated and techno versions a "treat". Similarly, French author Julien Rigal praised the remixes as being "successful", although musically different. More critical, Instant-Mag said some fans "expected more symphonic versions, such as those beautifully made, for example, for "Ainsi soit je..." and "Sans logique"", adding: "The 'darkness remix' amounts to a vague rhythmic (...); this pale copy [of Björk] does not have the best effect, although both the last two minutes are distinguished from the rest, they did not manage to redeem the whole". The 'anamor remix' is "too soft, slow, filled with strange noises sometimes verging on the ridiculous. Lastly, the 'momento dance mix', "although better than the two others, doesn't avoid the pitfall of the facility, the whole is slightly sprinkled with a little rhythm suggesting those of a boy band. It is nonetheless worthy of dancing".

== Chart performance ==
In France, the single entered the singles chart at a peak of number three on 22 July 2000, making Farmer able for the first time to place the five singles from a same album in the top ten. Expert of French chart Élia Habib thinks this high debut was due to the "excitement which coincided with the week of the single's release", as the next week "Innamoramento" made a dizzy drop and was only placed at number 17. Then the single continued to drop and remained for a total of eleven weeks in the top 50 and twenty weeks in the top 100, becoming the lower-selling single from Innamoramento. "Innamoramento" briefly charted in Belgium (Wallonia), debuting at number 32 on the Ultratop 50 on 29 July 2000, then peaked at number 24 the week after, dropped and left the chart after six weeks. In Switzerland, the single peaked at number 56 on 20 August 2008 and stayed for seven weeks in the top 100.

== Formats and track listings ==
These are the formats and track listings of single releases of "Innamoramento":

- CD single / CD single – Picture disc

No.	Title	Length
1.	"Innamoramento" (single version)	4:50
2.	"Innamoramento" (darkness remix)	4:26

- CD maxi – Digipack

No.	Title	Length
1.	"Innamoramento" (single version)	4:50
2.	"Innamoramento" (darkness remix)	5:26
3.	"Innamoramento" (anamor remix)	4:40
4.	"Innamoramento" (momento dance mix)	6:12

- 12" maxi / 12" maxi – promo

No.	Title	Length
1.	"Innamoramento" (momento dance mix)	6:12
2.	"Innamoramento" (anamor remix)	4:40
3.	"Innamoramento" (darkness remix)	5:26
4.	"Innamoramento" (single version)	4:50

- CD single – Promo / CD single – Promo – Luxurious cube

No.	Title	Length
1.	"Innamoramento" (single version)	4:50

- VHS – Promo

No.	Title	Length
1.	"Innamoramento" (video)	5:52

== Official versions ==
Version	Length	Album	Remixed by	Year	Comment
Album version	5:20	Innamoramento	—	1999	See the previous sections
Single version	4:50	—	Laurent Boutonnat	2000	This version is shorter than the album one and ends in a fade-out.
Radio edit	4:10	—	Laurent Boutonnat	2000	The last refrain ends with Farmer's voice, unlike the previous versions.
Darkness remix	5:26	—	Hot Sly and Visa	2000	This remix emphasizes Farmer's voice and adds some electronic sounds.
Anamor remix	4:40	—	Quentin and Visa	2000	This R&B and electro remix contains the whole lyrics from the original version.
Momento dance mix	6:12	—	Hot Sly	2000	This dance remix uses more drum machines and Farmer's voice is accelerated.
Music video	5:52	Music Videos III, Music Videos II & III	—	2000	uses the audio from the Mylenium Tour
Live version (recorded in 2000)	6:13 (audio); 6:49 (video)	Mylenium Tour	—	2000	There are four chorus at the end of the song, although the album version has only two ones after the musical bridge. The video version is longer as it ends in fade in. (see Mylenium Tour (tour))
Album version	5:10	Les Mots	Laurent Boutonnat	2001	The song ends in fade-out.

== Credits and personnel ==
These are the credits and the personnel as they appear on the back of the single:

- Mylène Farmer – lyrics
- Laurent Boutonnat – music
- Requiem Publishing – editions
- Polydor – recording company
- Claude Gassian – photo
- Henry Neu / Com'N.B – design
- Made in the E.U.

== Charts ==
=== Weekly charts ===
Chart (2000)	Peak position
Belgium (Ultratop 50 Wallonia)	24
Europe (European Hot 100 Singles)	17
France (SNEP)	3
Switzerland (Schweizer Hitparade)	54

=== Year-end charts ===
Chart (2000)	Position
Belgium Francophone (Ultratop 50 Wallonia)	38

== Release history ==
Region	Date	Format
France, Belgium, Switzerland	June 2000	Promo CD single, Promo 12" maxi, VHS
France, Belgium, Switzerland	17 July 2000	CD single, 12" maxi, 12" maxi
