= Optimistique-moi =

Single by Mylène Farmer

from the album Innamoramento
- B-side: "Remix"
- Released: 22 February 2000
- Recorded: 1999, France
- Genre: Alternative rock, dark wave
- Length: 4:50 (single version); 5:27 (album version)
- Label: Polydor
- Songwriter: Mylène Farmer
- Producer: Laurent Boutonnat

Mylène Farmer singles chronology
"Souviens-toi du jour" (1999)	"Optimistique-moi" (2000)	"Innamoramento" (2000)

"Optimistique-moi" (English: "Optimistic Me") is a 1999 song recorded by the French artist Mylène Farmer. The fourth single from her fifth studio album, Innamoramento, it was released on 22 February 2000. Dealing with parental relationships, the song enjoyed many remixes and formats and achieved success in France where it reached number seven.

== Background and writing ==
The song was one of the most anticipated singles by Farmer's fans, mostly because it was the first one to be fully composed, i.e. lyrics and music, by the singer. A promotional envelope, limited to 150 copies, was sent to radio stations, but several of them were stolen within the recording company, generating a judicial inquiry. As consequence, the release on radio originally scheduled for 4 January 2000 was delayed to 11 January. A new promotional format, a white CD single, was sent in turn to radio stations. The release of the formats was made in two times : first, the CD single and a CD maxi on 22 February 2000, then another CD maxi and the vinyl on 7 March. Unlike her previous singles, "Optimistique-moi" was released under two different digipacks for the remixes, which certainly helped to increase the single's sales (nine years later, "C'est dans l'air" had also two CD maxi). For the first time in the singer's career, the song was remixed in the U.S. where it was released in underground clubs, with only the words "MF", which allowed the artist's name to remain undisclosed; however, these remixes were also available in France. Regularly aired on radio in the single version, but also in the 'opti-mystic radio mix' on Europe 2, the song also enjoyed commercial ads on television (since 23 February on M6), and radios (since 18 February on NRJ).

== Lyrics and music ==
The lyrics are ambiguous and deal with parents-children relationships. It is both a love and reproachful song towards the two parents : a version for the mother and one for the father, but it is unknown whether the song is blaming the parents or thanking them. However, some verses clearly refer to incest: it is evoked through an allegory ("petit bouton de rose, aux pétales humides un baiser je dépose") and a phonetic pun ("tes câlins cessent toute ecchymose"). The song seems to be constructed as a dialogue between Farmer and her mother who addresses many criticisms to her daughter. The singer says she feels more secure with her father.

The verb "Optimistiquer" does not exist in French. According to the psychologist Hugues Royer, this word symbolizes the fact that the father is able to communicate to his child an optimist that fills with enthusiasm.

According to Instant-Mag, the song "is probably one of the most powerful, mysterious and violent that Farmer has ever written. The singer addressed a man she compares to her father "who was not like that" and "who was more clever"". However, "the father would do unthinkable acts (incest), but at the same time, his cuddles would cease her bruises. The former relationship with this powerful and magnified father, very ambiguous, is violently opposed to a mutual love that is dying". Several words of the chorus may refer to a lesbian poem by Paul Verlaine, Printemps.

== Music video ==
The video was directed by Michael Haussman who also directed several videoclips for Madonna, Richard Marx and Paula Abdul. The screenplay was written by Farmer, and, like the majority of the singer's videos, it is a Requiem Publishing and Stuffed Monkey production. It was shot in Prague over three days with a budget of about 150,000 euros, making it the second most expensive singles video from the album Innamoramento after "L'Âme-stram-gram". The Road Safety Department wanted to censor the end of the video because the position of the singer - standing in the back of a truck - was considered as a bad example that young people could reproduce. Farmer trained herself for many hours with acrobats, as she needed to be in balance on a ball in the video. The video was broadcast for the first time on M6 on 21 February 2000 and won the award for Best Video at the M6 Awards in November 2000.

Mylène Farmer and her monkey in the music video "Optimistique-moi". This scene was deemed a reference to Hector Malot's novel, Sans Famille.

The video features Farmer, a magician, and some athletes who perform circus acts under a big tent. Many animals are included, such as lions, elephants, a snake, a monkey and several doves. At the beginning, Farmer crosses the big circus tent walking on a wire suspended in the air. She almost falls several times. While jugglers and clowns look at her with suspicion, a magician is benevolent towards her. After being lowered from her wire, she starts to move in balance on a leather ball, with a little monkey on her shoulders. Then, the magician dresses Farmer with a white coat and puts her into a big red box, which is then pierced by some dwarfs with swords. When the box opens, several birds fly away and Farmer ends up in a truck in the countryside, her arms outspread. She seems to be very happy. At the end of video, the magician has aged.

According to some analyses, the fact that Farmer moves in balance on a ball would symbolize "the cycle, the eternal repetition", and would evoke "the idea of a route to accomplish". However, "thanks to the magic of her lover / father (the magician), the opportunity is given to Farmer to escape from her martyred life." In addition, the video would be "fraught with frequent allusions to the phallus" (knives, daggers, skittles pins, whips, elephant trunks, all of which are used in a suggestive manner). The woman attached to the wheel could represent the singer's mother, the box pierced by swords would represent the uterus, and the doves would symbolize "the outcome of a liberating sexual relationship". Several elements of the video, including the monkey on Farmer's shoulders, refer to Hector Malot's novel, Sans Famille. According to Royer, the last scene, which shows the man who has aged, explains the whole video: the father figure was revealed throughout the magician, and conveys the message that only a father "can detect distress of his daughter" and help her to maintain balance when in doubt.

== Chart performances ==
Although predicted to be one of the biggest hits of the album, "Optimistique-moi" had a similar chart run as that of the three previous singles from Innamoramento, i.e. a debut in the top ten, then a quick drop on the chart.

In France, it debuted at number seven on 26 February 2000, and reached this position again two weeks later, thanks to the release of the other two formats. As a result, this single "confirmed the disciplined loyalty of the singer's fans, ready to pounce on any new disc from its first week of release". This was the singer's 19th top ten in France. However, the single continued to drop fairly quickly and stayed for nine weeks in the top 50 and 15 weeks in the top 100. The single was certified Silver disc by the SNEP on 29 June 2000, four months and one week after its release. The song also reached number five on the club chart and number 18 on the airplay chart.

In Switzerland and Belgium, the chart performances of "Optimistique-moi" were also disappointing. On Swiss Singles Chart, it peaked at number 58 for two consecutive weeks on 19 and 26 March, then dropped and fell off the chart after eight weeks. On the Belgian Ultratop 40 Singles Chart, the single appeared for eight weeks. It entered at number 35 on 4 March 2000, reached number 15 three weeks later, then dropped, and was the second most successful single of the album, after "L'Âme-stram-gram".

Mylène Farmer performing "Optimistique-moi" in Les Années tube.

== Live performances ==
In 2000, Farmer performed the song on four television shows, making the song the most promoted one from Innamoramento: NRJ Music Awards (22 January, TF1), Les Années tube (3 March, TF1), Hit Machine (11 March, M6) and Tapis rouge (25 March, France 2). On these occasions, the singer wore a dress made by John Galliano and performed a choreography accompanied with six dancers. She almost fell while walking on the train of her dress when she performed in Hit Machine.

The song was only performed during the Mylenium Tour, as seventh song of the show, and was thus included in the track listing of the live album and DVD Mylenium Tour. When the first notes of the song were played, Farmer arrived by surprise on stage while spectators were watching the Chinese shadow of dancer Valérie Bony, believing she was Farmer. Farmer wore a black costume composed of a woven trousers open on the upper thighs, a transparent bustier, a shimmering jacket closed, high shoes with heels, a large necklace and two iron false-buttocks. She was surrounded by dancers similarly clothed, but without the jacket. They performed a very swift and rhythmical choreography, the same as for the promotion of the song. After the song, the chorus was sung a cappella several times by the audience and Farmer.

== Formats and track listings ==
These are the formats and track listings of single releases of "Optimistique-moi":

- CD single

No.	Title	Length
1.	"Optimistique-moi" (single version)	4:20
2.	"Optimistique-moi" (opti-mystic radio mix)	4:30

- CD maxi 1 - Digipack

No.	Title	Length
1.	"Optimistique-moi" (single version)	4:20
2.	"Optimistique-moi" (optimistic mix)	6:30
3.	"Optimistique-moi" (opti-mix-tic)	5:30

- CD maxi 2 - Digipack

No.	Title	Length
1.	"Optimistique-moi" (single version)	4:20
2.	"Optimistique-moi" (S-man's rugged terrain mix)	6:30
3.	"Optimistique-moi" (opti-mystic remix)	6:30
4.	"Optimistique-moi" (tha ATV dub)	6:25

- 12" maxi

No.	Title	Length
1.	"Optimistique-moi" (S-man's rugged terrain mix)	6:30
2.	"Optimistique-moi" (opti-mix-tic)	5:30
3.	"Optimistique-moi" (optimistic mix)	6:30
4.	"Optimistique-moi" (single version)	4:20

- Digital download

No.	Title	Length
1.	"Optimistique-moi" (album version)	4:22
2.	"Optimistique-moi" (2000 live version)	4:23
3.	"Optimistique-moi" (Junior Jack psycho vocal mix)	8:00

- CD single - Promo / CD single - Promo - Luxurious envelope

No.	Title	Length
1.	"Optimistique-moi" (single version)	4:20

- CD single - Promo - Remix

No.	Title	Length
1.	"Optimistique-moi" (opti-mystic radio mix)	4:30

- 12" maxi 1 - Promo

No.	Title	Length
1.	"Optimistique-moi" (opti-mix-tic)	5:30
2.	"Optimistique-moi" (single version)	4:20
3.	"Optimistique-moi" (optimistic mix)	6:30

- 12" maxi 2 - Promo

No.	Title	Length
1.	"Optimistique-moi" (S-man's rugged terrain mix)	6:30
2.	"Optimistique-moi" (single version)	4:20
3.	"Optimistique-moi" (tha ATV dub)	6:25

- 7" maxi - U.S.

No.	Title	Length
1.	"Optimistique-moi" (S-man's rugged terrain mix)	6:30
2.	"Optimistique-moi" (tha ATV dub)	6:25

- VHS - Promo

No.	Title	Length
1.	"Optimistique-moi" (video)

== Release history ==
Date	Label	Region	Format	Catalog
January 2000	Polydor	France, Belgium, Switzerland	CD single 1 - Promo	9314
January 2000	Polydor	France, Belgium, Switzerland	CD single 2 - Promo	9338
January 2000	Polydor	France, Belgium, Switzerland	7" maxi 1 - Promo	561 685-1
January 2000	Polydor	France, Belgium, Switzerland	7" maxi 2 - Promo	561 687-1
January 2000	Polydor	France, Belgium, Switzerland	VHS - Promo	—
January 2000	R-Senal	United States	7" maxi - Promo	RSNL0004
22 February 2000	Polydor	France, Belgium, Switzerland	CD single	561 684-2
22 February 2000	Polydor	France, Belgium, Switzerland	CD maxi 1	561 685-2
7 March 2000	Polydor	France, Belgium, Switzerland	12" maxi	561 688-1
7 March 2000	Polydor	France, Belgium, Switzerland	CD maxi 2	561 687-2

== Official versions ==
Version	Length	Album	Remixed by	Year	Comment
Album version	4:22	Innamoramento, Les Mots	—	1999	See the previous sections
Single version	4:18	—	—	2000	This version is almost the same as the album one, with a shorter musical introduction.
Opti-mystic radio mix	4:30	—	Hot Sly and Visa	2000	This version includes the whole lyrics from the original one, but with more strings and percussion, and with a man's voice in the background.
Optimistic mix	6:30	—	Hoop	2000	This is a dance and techno remix devoted to nightclubs.
Opti-mix-tic	5:30	—	D-Phunk T.	2000	This is a dance and techno version.
S-man's rugged terrain mix	6:30	—	Roger Sanchez	2000	It is a dance remix.
Tha ATV dub mix	6:25	—	Roger Sanchez	2000	All the words of the original song are removed, and Farmer sings only "Optimistique".
Opti-mystic remix	4:30	—	Hot Sly and Visa	2000	This dance remix contains all lyrics from the album version. The musical introduction lasts more than one minute.
Music video	4:26	Music Videos III, Music Videos II & III	—	2000	
Live version (recorded in 2000)	4:36 (audio); 5:48 (video)	Mylenium Tour	—	2000	This live version is similar to that of the album. (see Mylenium Tour)
Junior Jack psycho vocal mix	8:00	RemixeS	Junior Jack	2003	The introduction has disco sounds, using much drum machines and percussion. This dance version includes all lyrics from the original version, but with many echoes of Farmer's voice.

== Credits and personnel ==
These are the credits and the personnel as they appear on the back of the single:

- Mylène Farmer – music, lyrics
- Requiem Publishing – editions
- Polydor – recording company
- Philippe Salomon – photo
- Henry Neu / Com'N.B – design
- Made in the E.U.

== Charts ==
=== Weekly charts ===
Chart (2000)	Peak position
Belgium (Ultratop 50 Wallonia)	15
Europe (European Hot 100 Singles)	30
France (SNEP)	7
Switzerland (Schweizer Hitparade)	58

=== Year-end charts ===
Chart (2000)	Position
Belgium (Ultratop 50 Wallonia)	92
Belgium Francophone (Ultratop 50 Wallonia)	29
France (SNEP)	77

== Certifications ==
Region	Certification	Certified units/sales
France (SNEP)	Silver	125,000^{*}
^{*} Sales figures based on certification alone.
