= L'Âme-stram-gram =

1999 single by Mylène Farmer

Single by Mylène Farmer

from the album Innamoramento
- Released: 9 March 1999
- Genre: Techno; dance
- Length: 4:24 (album version); 5:16 (single version)
- Label: Polydor
- Composer: Laurent Boutonnat
- Lyricist: Mylène Farmer
- Producer: Laurent Boutonnat

Mylène Farmer singles chronology
| "Ainsi soit je..." (live) (1997) | "L'Âme-stram-gram" (1999) | "Je te rends ton amour" (1999) |

Music video
- "L'Âme-stram-gram" on YouTube

"L'Âme-stram-gram" is a song by French singer-songwriter Mylène Farmer. It was the lead single from her fifth studio album Innamoramento and was released on 9 March 1999. The lyrics were written by Farmer and the music was composed by Laurent Boutonnat. Musically, the song has techno and dance influences that marked an artistic change in the singer's career, although the rest of the album contains more pop songs. Based on a famous children's counting rhyme, the song is primarily about confidence, secret, and confession and uses the lexical field of psychoanalysis; however, the many puns and double entendres can also provide another meaning explicitly referring to sexuality.

Inspired by the romantic comedy horror film A Chinese Ghost Story, the expensive eight-minute music video was shot by Hong Kong film director Ching Siu-Tung in Beijing and displays Farmer portraying twin sisters who have supernatural powers; the first being kidnapped by Chinese bandits and rescued by her sister, who dies in the process, causing the first twin to commit suicide. Farmer promoted the song by performing it on three TV shows and then singing it on two of her subsequent tours. The single peaked at number two in France and was certified as silver for having over 125,000 sales. It was also a top-10 hit in Belgium's Wallonia region.

== Background and writing ==
As of January 1999, Farmer had not appeared on television for over a year and a half, the last time being the release of the live singles from the album Live à Bercy. At that time, it was rumoured that the singer's return was imminent, with the release of a very rhythmic single named "The Small World" and a new album whose name would be "Mes Moires". These rumours were incorrect; however, as early as February, the radio station NRJ aired Farmer's new single, titled "L'Âme-stram-gram". This techno and dance song seemed to display a major change in Farmer's musical register. According to Farmer, the choice of this single was made haphazardly, as she said in an interview: "This happened like that. Laurent [Boutonnat] wrote a rhythm, and I confess that I really want, precisely, something rhythmic, even a little lighter."

Promotional envelopes were released in a limited edition respectively on 2 and 6 March and contained, in addition to the CD single, the song's lyrics written by Farmer. As noted in the magazine Instant-Mag, there was a spelling mistake in the word "immiscer" and an erasure. The remixes, deemed "rather successful" by French author Julien Rigal, were not produced by Boutonnat, unlike Farmer's previous singles, but by Perky Park and Lady B. The art cover of the various formats, made by Italian photographer Marino Parisotto Vay, showed Farmer behind blue veils.

== Lyrics and music ==
En moi, en moi, toi que j'aime
Dis-moi, dis-moi quand ça n'va pas
Immisce et glisse l'abdomen
Dans mon orifice à moi

— End of the chorus

"L'Âme-stram-gram", whose lyrics were written in Milan, has techno influences and a subdued singer's voice, making it more heavenly. The music used more synthesizers and bass guitar than the songs from the previous album, Anamorphosée; the song, however, was not representative of the musical universe of Innamoramento. The song marked a change of influences by Farmer who "abandon[ed] the Slavonic and American universes to be interested in Asia", as noted by author Erwan Chuberre.

Lyrically, the song deals with sex, childhood and psychoanalysis. It contains numerous erotic puns inspired by the Marquis de Sade's works: "J'ouïs tout ce que tu confesses / Et l'essaim scande l'ivresse", "J'ouïs tout ce que tu susurres / L'essaim bat la mesure", "Immisce et glisse l'abdomen / Dans l'orifice à moi", "L'âme-stram-gram, pique-moi dans l'âme / Bourrée bourrée de nœuds mâles / L'âme-stram-gram pique dames". The sound associations refer to the orgasm, the female organs ("cunt", "buttock", "breast") and sexual penetration. The song also refers to a childhood rhyme similar to eeny, meeny, miny, moe — a song recited by children to point out a person at random from a group – and to the vocabulary of psychoanalysis through the subjects of the sofa and Sigmund Freud's "Oedipus complex". In an April 1999 interview, Farmer explained: "I tried to evoke the idea of confidence, secret, confession, the idea of "the other", simply. One's double, perhaps. In all cases, a friendly ear". Psychologist Hugues Royer said the song evokes "pleasure in all its forms which is seen as a way out" and, with "many encryoted puns", talks about "many amusing sexual practices".

== Music video ==
Mylène Farmer and her twin sister in the music video "L'Âme-stram-gram". As it was shot in China, its style was inspired by the country's culture.

The 7:50 video – 4:42 in a shorter version – was filmed by Hong Kong film director Ching Siu-Tung in Beijing over five days and four nights, although Farmer spent two weeks in China to oversee its production. Like most of the singer's other videos, it was a Requiem Publishing and Stuffed Monkey production. The screenplay, written by Farmer, is based on a Chinese legend and the film series A Chinese Ghost Story, made by Ching. The staging was done extremely carefully and the images were very aesthetic. The video had a budget that reached 900,000 euro, as the construction of scenery included a reconstruction of the Great Wall of China and digital special effects. Despite the cold temperatures during the shooting, Farmer was not wearing a T-shirt under her costume and also directed most of the stunts. She explained: "We worked a lot, sometimes twenty hours without interruption. Weather conditions were difficult. I had a permanent change of costumes. But it was exciting and it was the most important." Valérie Bony, a dancer in Farmer's concert tours, played Farmer's body double when the latter was shown from her back. Although the song deals with sexual issues, there are no sex scenes in the video.

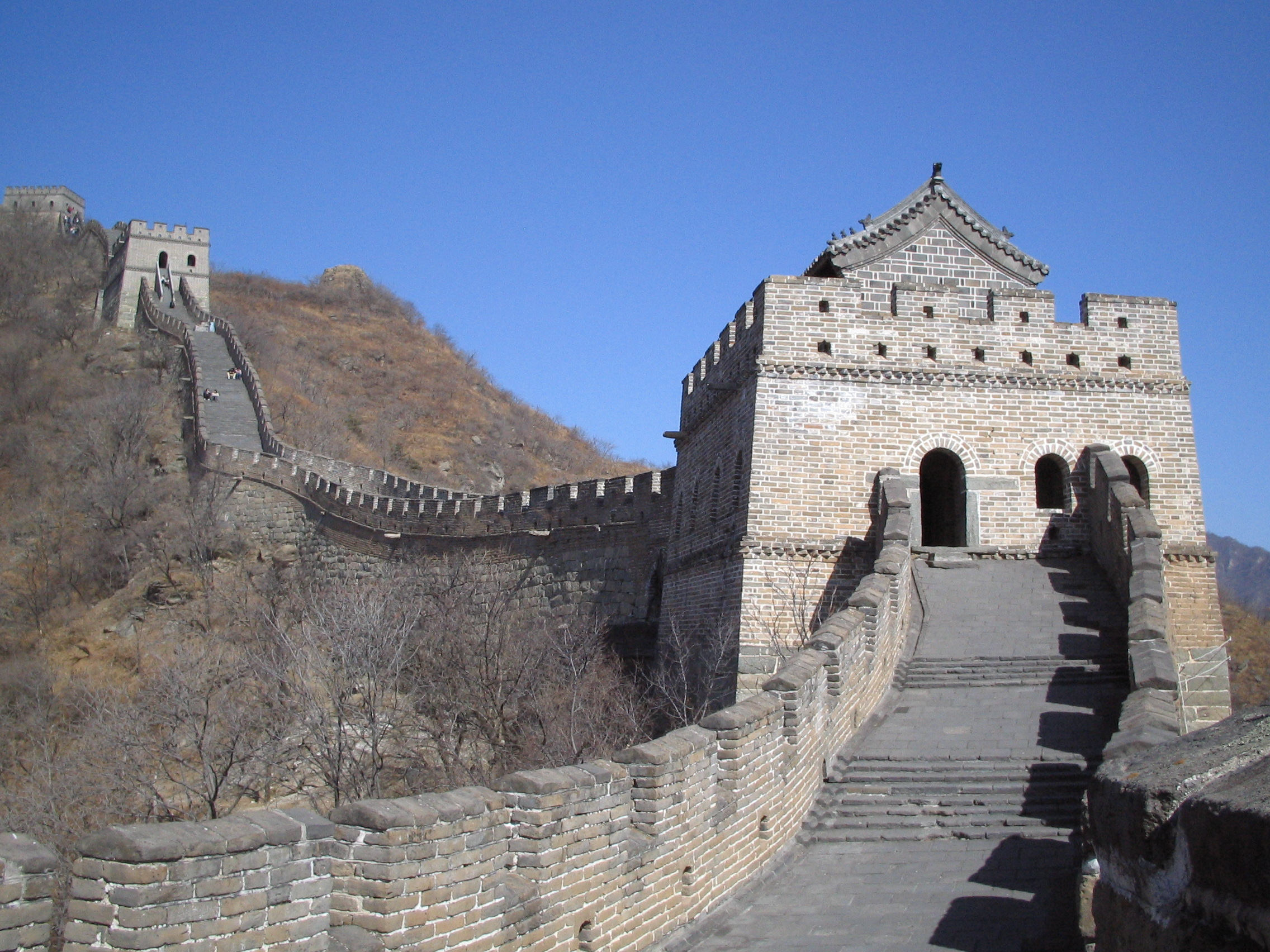
The music video used a replica of the Great Wall of China, which justified its high cost.

The video features twin sisters, played by Farmer, and several Chinese bandits. Initially, the sisters are dressed in green and purple veils and play together amongst pastel veils and hangings. A troupe of bandits arrives on horseback and pursues the sisters. Suddenly, the women flick out their long tongues, producing a powerful magical effect, causing the bandits to fall from their horses. Nevertheless, the bandits manage to kidnap one sister and knock the other one down, leaving her for dead. The kidnapped sister is brought to an immense stable where captives are being tortured, and she is threatened with violation. The other sister rushes to rescue her twin, despite being injured and exhausted. As she climbs the long staircase leading to the stable, she falls and dies. Her soul leaves her body, rises to the sky, and flies to her sister's aid. The sisters work their magic again to kill their enemies and escape. They then play in the air under the full moon; however, in the early morning, the soul of the dead sister disappears in the sky. The living sister, desperate, throws herself from the top of the Great Wall of China to be with her sister in the afterlife. At the end, the two sisters' souls, now dressed in white veils, frolic in the sky.

According to journalist Caroline Bee, the video illustrates the idea of "a myth overtaken by reality"; indeed, "the image of a serene life enshrined in the completeness, came to be overtaken by the harsh reality. This fantasy can exist and be realised only outside reality".

== Live performances ==
Mylène Farmer performing "L'Âme-stram-gram" in Tapis rouge, with her new hairstyle.

In 1999, Farmer performed the song on three television shows: Les Années tubes (2 April, TF1), Hit Machine (17 April, M6) and Tapis rouge (24 April, France 2). On these occasions, she performed a self-made choreography – crouching at the beginning with many arms gestures, then standing with suggestive movements of the pelvis – with two male dancers and displayed a new hairstyle with curls.

"L'Âme-stram-gram" was performed during the 1999 Mylenium Tour in an energetic Hispanic-oriented version, later included in the live album and DVD Mylenium Tour. Farmer wore an orange costume composed of privateer trousers, a thick jacket and orange shoes with high heels, and her dancers had costumes with different colors; they performed the same collective synchronised choreography as on television before Farmer repeated the refrain with the audience. The song was also performed on stage as the second song during the 2009 Mylène Farmer en tournée tour in an electro version, in which Farmer and her dancers, wearing a tight suit showing the human's muscular system, performed almost the same choreography. Royer qualified this choreography as being "wild". It was finally played on the Live 2019 tour in another completely reworked electro form with some new choreography this time but now lots of light and video effects.

== Chart performance ==
On the French Singles Chart, "L'Âme-stram-gram" debuted at number two on 13 March 1999. According to French chart expert Élia Habib, many people believed at the time that Farmer could become the first artist to obtain a number-one single from four studio albums, the first three being "Pourvu qu'elles soient douces" from Ainsi soit je..., "Désenchantée" from L'Autre..., and "XXL" from Anamorphosée. The single then fell down the chart, remaining in the top 10 for four weeks, the top 50 for 10 weeks, and the top 100 for 16 weeks. The single was awarded a silver disc by the Syndicat National de l'Édition Phonographique (SNEP) on 15 December 1999 and was ranked number 58 on the SNEP year-end chart for 1999.

In Belgium's Wallonia region, the single remained on the Ultratop 50 for 13 weeks. It debuted on 20 March at number 22 before climbing to a peak of number nine the week after. It was the most successful single from Innamoramento in the region, with the longest chart trajectory and highest peak position. It ranked in at number 53 on the Walloon year-end chart.

== Formats and track listings ==
These are the formats and track listings of single releases of "L'Âme-stram-gram":

- CD single

| No. | Title | Length |
|---|---|---|
| 1. | "L'Âme-stram-gram" (single version) | 4:16 |
| 2. | "L'Âme-stram-gram" (instrumental) | 4:20 |

- CD maxi – Digipack / CD maxi – Crystal case – Germany

| No. | Title | Length |
|---|---|---|
| 1. | "L'Âme-stram-gram" (single version) | 4:20 |
| 2. | "L'Âme-stram-gram" (Perky Park pique dames club mix) | 6:35 |
| 3. | "L'Âme-stram-gram" (Perky Park pique d'âme dub mix) | 6:50 |
| 4. | "L'Âme-stram-gram" (Lady Bee by Lady B's remix) | 6:25 |

- 12-inch maxi

| No. | Title | Length |
|---|---|---|
| 1. | "L'Âme-stram-gram" (Perky Park pique dames club mix) | 6:35 |
| 2. | "L'Âme-stram-gram" (single version) | 4:20 |
| 3. | "L'Âme-stram-gram" (Perky Park pique d'âme club mix) | 6:50 |
| 4. | "L'Âme-stram-gram" (Lady Bee by Lady B's remix) | 6:25 |

== Official versions ==
| Version | Length | Album | Remixed by | Year | Comment |
|---|---|---|---|---|---|
| Album version | 4:24 | Innamoramento, Les Mots | — | 1999 | See the previous sections |
| Single version | 4:16 | — | — | 1999 | The introduction and the end are slightly shorter. |
| Promotional single version | 4:12 | — | — | 1999 | The introduction and the end are slightly shorter. |
| Instrumental | 4:23 | — | — | 1999 | All lyrics are removed. |
| Perky Park pique dames club mix | 6:38 | — | Perky Park | 1999 | This dance and house version starts with a three-minute musical introduction and contains only refrains from the original version as lyrics. |
| Perky Park pique d'âme dub mix | 6:52 | — | Perky Park | 1999 | This is a house version in which all lyrics have almost all been removed. Farmer sings only "Âme-stram-gram" and some onomatopoeia. |
| Lady Bee by Lady B's remix | 6:27 | — | Lady B, aka Bruno Gauthier | 1999 | "L'âme-stram-gram, pique-moi dans l'âme / Bourrée bourrée de nœuds mâles / L'âme-stram-gram pique dames" are the only lyrics of this version. The cry that Farmer launches at the beginning of "Libertine" can be heard throughout this remix. |
| Music video | 7:50 | Music Videos III, Music Videos II & III | — | 1999 | |
| Live version (recorded in 2000) | 5:59 (audio); 5:45 (video) | Mylenium Tour | — | 2000 | The introduction has Oriental sounds. (see Mylenium Tour) |
| Full intention sultra mix | 7:57 | RemixeS | Full Intention | 2003 | This dance remix adds many percussions. After an about three-minute introduction, Farmer sings all lyrics from the original version. |
| Live version (recorded in 2009) | 5:27 | N°5 on Tour | — | 2009 | It is a very dynamic electro remix featuring some soundsamples of the original version. (see Mylène Farmer en tournée) |
| Live version (recorded in 2019) | 4:08 | Live 2019 | — | 2019 | This version is somewhat different from the previous ones since in the entrance of the song the same entrance to the already well-known song "Du Hast" by the German band Ramstein sounds, it also has more modern rhythms in which the atmosphere is very dark already characteristic of the artist. (see Mylène Farmer en tournée) |

== Credits and personnel ==
These are the credits and the personnel as they appear on the back of the single:

- Mylène Farmer – lyrics
- Laurent Boutonnat – music
- Requiem Publishing – editions
- Polydor – recording company
- Marino Parisotto Vay – photo
- Henry Neu / Com'N.B – design

== Charts ==
=== Weekly charts ===
| Chart (1999) | Peak position |
|---|---|
| Belgium (Ultratop 50 Wallonia) | 9 |
| Europe (European Hot 100 Singles) | 14 |
| France (SNEP) | 2 |

=== Year-end charts ===
| Chart (1999) | Position |
|---|---|
| Belgium (Ultratop 50 Wallonia) | 53 |
| Belgium Francophone (Ultratop 50 Wallonia) | 22 |
| France (SNEP) | 58 |

== Certifications ==
| Region | Certification | Certified units/sales |
|---|---|---|
| France (SNEP) | Silver | 125,000^{*} |
^{*} Sales figures based on certification alone.

== Release history ==
| Region | Date | Format |
|---|---|---|
| France | 9 March 1999 | CD single, CD maxi, 12-inch maxi |
| Germany | June 1999 | CD maxi |
