= Mylenium Tour (tour) =

1999–2000 concert tour by Mylène Farmer

- Tour by Mylène Farmer
- Location: Europe
- Associated album: Innamoramento
- Start date: 21 September 1999
- End date: 8 March 2000
- No. of shows: 42

Mylène Farmer concert chronology
- Live à Bercy (1996); Mylenium Tour (1999–2000); Avant que l'ombre... à Bercy (2006)

The Mylenium Tour was Mylène Farmer's 1999–2000 concert tour in support of her fifth studio album, Innamoramento.

== Critical reception and commercial success ==
According to the French magazine Instant-Mag, the "Mylenium Tour is more beautiful [than the 1996 tour] by the originality of the selection of songs, the grandiose stage, an entry even more impressive, and especially an overwhelming and perfect end, perhaps more comparable to that of the 1989 tour."

More than 450,000 people attended the concert series that cost more than 20 million euros.

A musical channel of the Russian television, MUZ TV, elected "Mylenium Tour" as the best concert at that year.

== Set list ==
Introduction

1. "Mylenium" (opening)
2. "L'Amour naissant"

Act I

3. "L'Âme-stram-gram"
4. "Beyond My Control" (replaced by "Que mon cœur lâche" in Russia)
5. "Rêver"
6. "Il n'y a pas d'ailleurs" (not performed in Russia)
7. "Mylène Is Calling (Interlude)"

Act II

8. "Optimistique-moi"
9. "Medley" ("Pourvu qu'elles soient douces" / "Libertine" / "Maman a tort" / "Sans contrefaçon")
10. "Regrets"
11. "Désenchantée"

Act III

12. "Méfie-toi"
13. "Dessine-moi un mouton"
14. "California"
15. "Pas le temps de vivre" (replaced by "Je t'aime mélancolie" in Russia)

Act IV

16. "Je te rends ton amour"
17. "Souviens-toi du jour"

Encore

18. "Dernier Sourire"
19. "Innamoramento"
20. "Mylenium" (closing)

== Tour dates ==
There were a total of 43 shows, from 21 September 1999 to 8 March 2000, in four countries (France, Belgium, Switzerland and Russia):

Date	City	Country	Venue
Europe
21 September 1999	Marseille	France	Le Dôme de Marseille
24 September 1999	Paris	France	Palais omnisports de Paris-Bercy
25 September 1999	Paris	France	Palais omnisports de Paris-Bercy
26 September 1999	Paris	France	Palais omnisports de Paris-Bercy
29 September 1999	Paris	France	Palais omnisports de Paris-Bercy
6 October 1999	Lille	France	Zénith de Lille
7 October 1999	Forest	Belgium	Forest National
8 October 1999	Forest	Belgium	Forest National
9 October 1999	Forest	Belgium	Forest National
17 November 1999	Lille	France	Zénith de Lille
19 November 1999	Lyon	France	Palais des Sports
20 November 1999	Lyon	France	Palais des Sports
21 November 1999	Lyon	France	Palais des Sports
24 November 1999	Orléans	France	Zénith d'Orléans
25 November 1999	Caen	France	Zénith de Caen
26 November 1999	Angers	France	Amphitéa
27 November 1999	Le Mans	France	Antarès
1 December 1999	Toulouse	France	Zénith de Toulouse Métropole
2 December 1999	Pau	France	Zénith de Pau
3 December 1999	Bordeaux	France	Patinoire de Mériadeck
4 December 1999	Bordeaux	France	Patinoire de Mériadeck
5 December 1999	Montpellier	France	Zénith de Montpellier
7 December 1999	Toulon	France	Zénith Oméga
8 December 1999	Marseille	France	Le Dôme de Marseille
9 December 1999	Geneva	Switzerland	SEG Geneva Arena
10 December 1999	Amnéville	France	Galaxie Amnéville
13 December 1999	Paris	France	Palais omnisports de Paris-Bercy
8 February 2000	Lille	France	Zénith de Lille
9 February 2000	Forest	Belgium	Forest National
11 February 2000	Lausanne	Switzerland	Patinoire de Malley
12 February 2000	Lyon	France	Palais des Sports
13 February 2000	Lyon	France	Palais des Sports
15 February 2000	Amnéville	France	Galaxie Amneville
17 February 2000	Grenoble	France	Summum
18 February 2000	Toulouse	France	Zénith de Toulouse Métropole
19 February 2000	Bordeaux	France	Patinoire de Mériadeck
22 February 2000	Brest	France	Parc des expositions de Penfeld
23 February 2000	Caen	France	Zénith de Caen
25 February 2000	Douai	France	Gayant Expo
26 February 2000	Orléans	France	Zénith d'Orléans
4 March 2000	Moscow	Russia	Olimpiyskiy
5 March 2000	Moscow	Russia	Olimpiyskiy
8 March 2000	Saint Petersburg	Russia	SKK Peterburgsky

== Content ==
No	Song	Costume	Choreography	Comment
1	"Mylenium"	White transparent dress with a plunging neckline in the back, sailing on the shoulders, shoes with high heels, white large necklace.	No	The stage is hidden under a large white curtain which turns blue when "Mylenium", an instrumental song with African vocals, begins to be played. The curtain falls and the audience discovers the huge statue representing Isis (nine metres) in the middle of the stage. While the light intensifies, a white smoke emanates from the statue whose head opens in two parts, showing the shadow of Farmer. Suspended by pulling invisible strings, the singer flies above the stage while the right articulated hand of the statue stands to take down her. There were sometimes some technical problems, Farmer remaining suspended in the air longer than expected.
2	"L'Amour naissant"	Same costume	No. Farmer's arms are outspread during the refrain.	As in the original song, a thunderous noise is heard at the beginning. Farmer begins to sing and drops from the statue's hand. In the background of the stage, images of luminous cracked globes appear on the giant screen. When Farmer leaves the stage, the song is extended by the female vocalists to let her more time to change her clothes. This live performance is very similar to that of the album.
3	"L'Âme-stram-gram"	* Farmer: Orange costume composed of a privateer trousers, a thick jacket and orange shoes, with high heels. * Dancers: Costumes with different colors.	Collective synchronised choreography produced by Farmer, the same as that used for the TV promotion of the song. Crouching at the beginning with many arms gestures, then standing with suggestive movements of the pelvis.	The introduction has oriental sonorities. After the performance, there are the first repetitions of the refrain with the audience.
4	"Beyond My Control" "Que mon cœur lâche" in Russia	Same costume	No	At the beginning of the song, Farmer asks the audience to clap their hands. The words "It's beyond My Control", pronounced by John Malkovich in the studio version, are replaced.
5	"Rêver"	Same costume	No	"Consentement" was originally scheduled at this moment, but was eventually replaced by "Rêver". The song is performed in an identical version as that of 1996 Tour. At the end of the song, the refrain is repeated with the audience.
6	"Il n'y a pas d'ailleurs" Not performed in Russia	Same costume	No	Farmer performs the song standing in the right hand of the statue that rises and then goes down.
7	"Mylène Is Calling"	Same costume	No	Valérie Bony, one of the female dancers, replaces Farmer who goes in backstage to change costume. Bony appears in Chinese shadow, wearing a wig, and makes some movements with her arms, but she doesn't sing.
8	"Optimistique-moi"	* Farmer : Black costume composed of a woven trousers open on the upper thighs, a transparent bustier, a shimmering jacket closed, high shoes with heels, a large necklace and two iron false-buttocks. * Dancers : Same costume, without the jacket.	Very swift and rhythmical choreography, the same as for the promotion of the song.	Farmer arrives by surprise while spectators watch even the Chinese shadow of Valérie Bony (they believe she is Farmer). The song is repeated several times by the fans with Farmer.
9	"Medley" ("Pourvu qu'elles soient douces" / "Libertine" / "Maman a tort" / "Sans contrefaçon")	Same costume, without the jacket	Collective choreography, the same as for "Pourvu qu'elles soient douces" during the 1989 Tour.	The song is accompanied by numerous fireworks. That is the only medley performed by Farmer throughout her career.
10	"Regrets"	Same costume	No	Farmer sings all the song's lyrics, while a red light burns in the palm of the statue's hand that moves. This live version was scheduled for release as second single from the concert, but was finally abandoned.
11	"Désenchantée"		Many arms movements.	
12	"Méfie-toi"	White dress hidden under a long brown leather jacket, entirely closed, and white shoes.	Collective choreography, including a few steps on the stairs.	Farmer comes out of the large doors drawn on the statue's body and goes down the staircase that appears with red fabric flames on the sides. This version is very similar to that of the album.
13	"Dessine-moi un mouton"	Same costume, without the jacket.	No	Before the song begins, Farmer sits on the steps of the staircase and whistles. While the dancers make several acrobatics and play leapfrog, she performs the song, sitting on a swing with two headers sphinx at both ends. A rain of silver sequins down from heaven on artists and the andiance. After her performance, Farmer goes down the swing and presents the musicians.
14	"California"	Same costume	No	Farmer and two female vocalists sit on the steps of the staircase, and then get up and do a few steps on the stage. Then Farmer goes in front of the door at the top of the stairs. At the end, Farmer left the stage while it is in a full black. This acoustic version has jazzy sonorities.
15	"Pas le temps de vivre" "Je t'aime mélancolie" in Russia	Same costume, with a large transparent white jacket	No	Farmer performs the song a cappella until the first refrain. She sometimes cries and the audience sings instead of her. During some shows, a spectator was allowed to climb on the stage and Farmer took him by the hand. There is a long musical bridge at the end to let time for Farmer to change her costume.
16	"Je te rends ton amour"	Similar dress to that Farmer wore in the video : a red dress with a very long train.	No	The stage turns red. Farmer performed the song on a platform. In February and March, Farmer has added a repetition a cappella with the audience and a new musical direction.
17	"Souviens-toi du jour"	Same costume	The singer uses a simple choreography referring to the universal sign language, performed with other dancers.	After performing the song, Farmer thanks the audience and says goodbye. She then twice repeats the refrain with the audience.
18	"Dernier Sourire"	Same dress that Farmer wore when she took the stage.	No	Farmer sings again the first verse at the end of the song, and begins to cry. This live version is the second track on the CD single "Dessine-moi un mouton".
19	"Innamoramento"	Same costume	No	Farmer sings four times the final refrain, and then goes into the statue's hand.
20	"Mylenium"	Same costume	No	Farmer begins to sing "Mylenium" once back in the statue's hand. A curtain falls, and the show ends. However, at a show, the curtain did not fall and Farmer had to descend from the statue to public view with the help of a ladder.

== Credits and personnel ==
- Production: Tuxedo Tour
- Editions: Requiem Publishing
- Design entertainment: Mylène Farmer
- Set designer: Guy-Claude François
- Costumes designed by: Dominique Borg
- Make-up & hair: Pierre Vinuesa
- Lighting design: Fred Peveri
- Sound: Laurent Buisson
- Sound engineer: Thierry Rogen
- Production director: Paul Van Parys
- Musical direction: Yvan Cassar
- Musicians: Yvan Cassar, Eric Chevalier (keyboards), Jeff Dahlgren, Brian Ray (guitar), Jerry Watts Jr (bass), Abraham Laboriel Jr (drums)
- Choristers: Johana Manchec-Ferdinand, Esther Dobong' Na Essienne
- Choreography: Mylène Farmer ("L'Âme-Stram-Gram", "Optimistique-moi", "Désenchantée", "Souviens-toi du jour"); Christophe Danchaud ("Méfie-toi", "Dessine-moi un mouton"); Mylène Farmer and Christophe Danchaud ("Pourvu qu'elles soient douces").
- Management: Thierry Suc
- Dancers: Christophe Danchaud, Valérie Bony, Augustin Madrid Ocampo Jr, Midori Anami, Lysander O. Abadia, Andrew Cheng, Richard Patten, Corey Smith
- Sponsors: NRJ, TF1, Coca-Cola
- Photos: Claude Gassian
- Design: Henry Neu / Com' N.B
- Tour Truck Drivers: Andy Barr, Davey Forbes, Mark Philips, Rob Bailey.

== Further reading and press ==
- Julien Wagner, Jean-François Kowalski, Marianne Rosenstiehl, Claude Gassian, Mylène Farmer : Belle de scène (book on Farmer's tours), K&B Ed, 27 April 2007 (ISBN 291595707X)
- (in German) "Ein (zu) diskreter Star", von Mary-Claude Taillens, Interview in Le Matin (Schweiz), 10 March 2000
- (in German) "Mylènium-Universum", Olivier Sagnezchi, Article in Talkies Magazine, March 2000
- (in German) Interview in Argumente i Fakte (Rußland), March 2000
- (in German) Interview in Pulse (Rußland), March 2000
- (in German) Article in einer russischen Zeitung, March 2000
