= Je te rends ton amour =

Single by Mylène Farmer

from the album Innamoramento
- B-side: "Effets secondaires"
- Released: 8 June 1999
- Recorded: 1999, France
- Genre: Alternative rock, gothic rock
- Length: 5:05 (single version); 5:12 (album version)
- Label: Polydor
- Songwriters: Lyrics: Mylène Farmer; Music: Laurent Boutonnat
- Producer: Laurent Boutonnat

Mylène Farmer singles chronology
"L'Âme-stram-gram" (1999)	"Je te rends ton amour" (1999)	"Souviens-toi du jour" (1999)

"Je te rends ton amour" (English: "I Give You Back Your Love") is a song recorded by the French artist Mylène Farmer. The second single from her fifth studio album Innamoramento, it was released on 8 June 1999. The song became another top 10 hit in France for Farmer, and its controversial music video gained considerable attention at the time, being censored by several television channels.

== Background and writing ==
After the release of "L'Âme-stram-gram", it was rumoured that "Dessine-moi un mouton" would be the second single from Innamoramento, with a video inspired by Antoine de Saint-Exupéry's Le Petit Prince, featuring the crash of an airplane. However, Farmer decided to release her favorite song of the album, "Je te rends ton amour", instead. This song, which was composed by Laurent Boutonnat originally for Nathalie Cardone, enabled the album to remain in the top of the charts during the summer of 1999.

The single was released in various formats along with "Effets secondaires", as well as two remixes produced by Perky Park. The image used for various covers, made by Marino Parisotto Vay, shows Farmer being crucified. The designer Henry Neu said to be particularly proud of having made the velvet envelope containing a promotional cross-shaped CD.

== Lyrics and music ==
The lyrics contain several references to painting, including Egon Schiele (referenced by name in the refrain), an Austrian painter born in 1890 and died at 28, who painted many thin red-headed women, and who was much appreciated by Farmer. His painting Femme nue debout is even mentioned in the chorus. French painter Paul Gauguin is also cited in the lyrics, as well as the lexical field of painting. In the song, Farmer evokes a Schiele's painting, La Femme nue debout, and personifies the model painted. She also uses the typography of Schiele's signature to write the song's title on the cover of the CD and vinyl. According to the author Erwan Chuberre, the song deals with "a too heavy love to hold or with a weight of an artist on his work".

== Music video ==
=== Production and plot ===
These scenes of nudity, rape and blood in a church in front of a crucifix in the music video "Je te rends ton amour" was deemed as shocking by the Conseil supérieur de l'audiovisuel.

For the first time in Farmer's career, the video was directed by François Hanss. Shot for two days in the Notre-Dame-du-Val abbey of Mériel (Val-d'Oise, France), this Requiem Publishing and Stuffed Monkey production cost about 100,000 euros. The screenplay was written by Mylène Farmer.

At the beginning of the video, we see a blind woman, Farmer, wearing a pink dress, with a Bible in her hand. She goes out of a tunnel and walks in a forest, touching trees to locate. She comes to a church, and then enters the confessional, followed by the Devil, in the form of a man dressed in a black robe. She opens her Bible written in Braille and starts to read it with her fingers; then she removes her alliance ring and places it on the Bible. The Devil, meanwhile, plunges his fingers with long nails into the holy water font, extinguishes the candles and knocks down chairs, then moves to the other side of the confessional. His eyes are similar to those of a snake. Gargoyles and statues of Christ are shown on several occasions. Blood starts to flow along the woman's hands and legs. The Devil then knocks over the Bible and grabs the woman by the neck. She tries first to resist, but soon she is caught hold of by the Devil who smears blood all over her naked body. Gagged and tied, she is then shown in a crucifixion position on the beams of the nave. The video then shows the woman crouching on a pool of blood in manner of a still-unborn fetus in the womb. Having had a bath in it, she leaves her alliance ring suggestively in the same pool of blood, and finally she exits the church in a black dress and with her vision restored.

=== Critical reception ===
The video caused considerable controversy in France, due to its scenes of nudity and blood, and of its apparent criticism of Christianity and the Church. It was considered as being "too daring". The Conseil supérieur de l'audiovisuel gave a negative opinion, but it did not ban television channels from broadcasting it. A committee, mainly composed of housewives, decided to broadcast a shortened version of the video during the day so as to not shock children. Therefore, M6 aired a short two-minute version that stopped when the demon wildly caught Farmer, at the second chorus. In response to this censorship, Farmer asked Hanss to cut the shocking scenes for the airing on television and decided to release the video in its full version as a VHS with a booklet of unpublished photos by Claude Gassian. All funds collected from the 70,000 sales of the tape were returned to Sidaction, an association fighting against AIDS. In 2000, in an interview on MCM, the singer said about this censorship:

"Ça n'a aucun intérêt de vouloir choquer à tout prix pour qu'on s'interesse à vous. Il se trouve que j'aborde des sujets qui sont peut-être un peu épineux voire tabous. C'est un risque... Maintenant, la censure, spécialement en France est un peu sévère et s'attaque à tout et n'importe quel sujet ce que je trouve vraiment regrettable."

(English translation: "It's not interesting to want to be shocking at all costs in order to be relevant/interesting. I deal with subjects that are maybe a little tricky, taboo. It's a risk... right now the censorship, especially in France, is a bit harsh and it attacks everything and any subject... I find this truly regrettable.")

According to some, "Je te rends ton amour" is one of Farmer's most symbolism-heavy music videos, "bringing together aestheticism, shock images and deep themes". Several interpretations are possible.

== Promotion and live performances ==
Mylène Farmer performing the song on 50 Ans de tubes, with the dress made by John Galliano.

Mylène Farmer sang "Je te rends ton amour" on two television shows: First, in La Fureur du parc (in playback) on 19 June. The show was broadcast in the Parc des Princes, in Paris. Farmer accepted to perform her song provided to sing at the lead of the program. She appeared suddenly from the ground, standing on a platform that rose in the air. Then, in 50 Ans de tubes on 30 July, in which the singer performed the song in a works gallery of the French sculptor Caesar, in Provence. At these occasions, Farmer wore the same dress that she had worn in the video. This dress was made by the British fashion designer John Galliano. As Farmer was not allowed to wear it again for her 2000 tour, she did make a similar dress.

Regarding the tours, "Je te rends ton amour" was first performed during the 1999, in which Farmer wore a red dress with a very long train and performed on a platform, while the stage turns red; in February and March, Farmer added a repetition a cappella with the audience and a new musical direction. Second, the song was performed during the 2009 tours: Farmer wore an asymmetrical business suit composed of a white tutu underneath, and the stage was covered with red light. The song was selected for inclusion in the track listing of 2006 concerts Avant que l'ombre... à Bercy; it had even been sung during the rehearsals, but was finally rejected. It was performed again during Mylene Farmer 2019 with Farmer sitting on a wolf throne with a demonic holograph displayed on the jumbo screen behind her. As the performance draws to a close, she strikes a pose that evokes the Desobeissance album cover.

== B-side: "Effets secondaires" ==
The CD single and CD maxi contain that was a new song at the time, "Effets secondaires" (English: "Side Effects").

The song depicts Farmer as suffering from insomnia due to the taking of a drug which has side effects. Farmer counts the hours as they go by and seems to read though sounds delirious. She mentions Krueger, a reference to the main antagonist from the Nightmare on Elm Street horror film series which has sleep deprivation as a central theme. . In terms of structure, only refrains are sung, while the verses are spoken in low tones. The song ends with a long ringing alarm clock.

This song is included on Farmer's greatest hits album Les Mots in 2001. It has never been performed on stage or on television.

== Critical reception ==
Chuberre praised the song, saying ""Je te rends ton amour" showed the songwriter's progression and advancing craft. It is a superb text dealing with a too heavy love to hold or with a weight of an artist on his work". He describes the melody as being "insistent and bewitching", the image for the formats as "fascinating", but the remixes as being of lower quality than those of "L'Âme-stram-gram".

Sales of the single were lukewarm. In France, it debuted at a peak of number ten on 12 June, which was at the time the 17th top ten of Farmer. However, the single fell sharply the following week and then stayed in lower positions. It stayed for 12 weeks in the Top 50 and 20 weeks in the top 100. It was the 78th best-selling single of 1999 in France, but the second least-selling single from Innamoramento.

In Belgium (Wallonia), the single entered the Ultratop 40 at number 30 on 19 June and reached a peak of number 18 the next week. Then it dropped on the chart and totalled ten weeks in the top 40. It was ranked at number 92 in Belgian Annual Chart.

== Cover versions ==
In 2005, the song was covered by the band Lo-Fi.

== Formats and track listings ==
These are the formats and track listings of single releases of "Je te rends ton amour":

- CD single

No.	Title	Length
1.	"Je te rends ton amour" (single version)	5:05
2.	"Effets secondaires"	3:30

- CD maxi - Digipack

No.	Title	Length
1.	"Je te rends ton amour" (single version)	5:05
2.	"Je te rends ton amour" (redemption Perky Park club mix)	6:35
3.	"Je te rends ton amour" (illumination Perky Park dub mix)	6:32
4.	"Effets secondaires"	3:30

- 12" maxi / 12" maxi - Picture disc - Limited edition (3,000)

No.	Title	Length
1.	"Je te rends ton amour" (redemption Perky Park club mix)	6:35
2.	"Je te rends ton amour" (single version)	5:05
3.	"Je te rends ton amour" (illumination Perky Park dub mix)	6:32

- Digital download

No.	Title	Length
1.	"Je te rends ton amour" (album version)	5:12
2.	"Je te rends ton amour" (2000 live version)	5:14

- CD single - Promo / CD single - Promo - Luxurious crucifix

No.	Title	Length
1.	"Je te rends ton amour" (single version)	4:52

- VHS / VHS - Promo

No.	Title	Length
1.	"Je te rends ton amour" (video)	5:05

== Release history ==
Date	Label	Region	Format	Catalog
May 1999	Polydor	France, Belgium	CD single - Promo	9152
May 1999	Polydor	France, Belgium	12" maxi - Promo	2992
May 1999	Polydor	France, Belgium	VHS - Promo	—
1 June 1999	Polydor	France, Belgium	CD single	561 118-2
1 June 1999	Polydor	France, Belgium	12" maxi	561 129-1
1 June 1999	Polydor	France, Belgium	CD maxi	561 129-2

== Official versions ==
Version	Length	Album	Remixed by	Year	Comment
Album version	5:12	Innamoramento, Les Mots	—	1999	See the previous sections
Single version	5:05	—	—	1999	This version is almost identical to the album one.
Promotional single version	4:52	—	—	1999	This version is shorter without the last echo of drum is removed.
Redemption Perky Park club mix	6:35	—	Perky Park	1999	It is a dance version with many percussion devoted to nightclubs. The musical introduction lasts two minutes, all verses are deleted and the refrain can be heard after four minutes.
Illumination Perky Park dub mix	6:32	—	Parky Park	1999	This is a dance version too. After two minutes, Farmer sings the first verse, the refrain and the second verse.
Music video	5:05	Music Videos III, Music Videos II & III	—	1999	
Live version (recorded in 2000)	5:15	Mylenium Tour	—	2000	This live version is very similar to that of the album. See Mylenium Tour
Live version (recorded in 2009)	5:28	N°5 on Tour	—	2009	See Mylène Farmer en tournée

== Credits and personnel ==
These are the credits and the personnel as they appear on the back of the single:

- Mylène Farmer – lyrics
- Laurent Boutonnat – music
- Requiem Publishing – editions
- Polydor – recording company
- Marino Parisotto Vay – photo
- Henry Neu / Com'N.B – design

== Charts ==
=== Weekly charts ===
Chart (1999)	Peak position
Belgium (Ultratop 50 Wallonia)	18
Europe (European Hot 100 Singles)	43
France (SNEP)	10

=== Year-end charts ===
Chart (1999)	Position
Belgium (Ultratop 50 Wallonia)	92
Belgium Francophone (Ultratop 50 Wallonia)	37
France (SNEP)	78
