= Rêver =

Single by Mylène Farmer

from the album Anamorphosée
- Language: French
- English title: "Dreaming"
- B-side: "Rêver" (live)
- Released: 16 November 1996
- Recorded: 1995
- Genre: Psychedelic pop
- Length: 4:42
- Label: Polydor
- Composer: Laurent Boutonnat
- Lyricist: Mylène Farmer
- Producer: Laurent Boutonnat

Mylène Farmer singles chronology
"Comme j'ai mal" (1996)	"Rêver" (1996)	"La Poupée qui fait non" (1997)

Alternative cover
- CD maxi

"Rêver" (English: "Dreaming") is a 1995 song recorded by French singer-songwriter Mylène Farmer. It was the fifth single from her fourth album Anamorphosée and was released on 16 November 1996. In spite of moderate sales and chart performances, the song remains one of the most known by the general public because of the subjects it deals with, notably war and a call for tolerance.

== Background, writing and release ==
Initially, only four singles from the studio album Anamorphosée were scheduled. However, because of the fall of Farmer during a concert in Lyon on 15 June 1996, the song "Rêver" was chosen as the fifth single to make the fans wait, since the release of the live album would be deferred.

The single was released only as CD, and there was no vinyl. On the single cover, Farmer is kneeling, completely naked while showing modesty, which seems to be paradoxal. The digipack version of the CD maxi contains a new remix of "XXL". The second track of the CD single is the live version of the song. As for the single remix ('stripped dream remix'), it was produced by Laurent Boutonnat.

== Lyrics and video ==
"Rêver" was Farmer's first song to refer to the genocide of World War II, in the first line, through the book If This Is a Man, written by Primo Levi (the second single was "Souviens-toi du jour"). One line of the chorus, "J'irai cracher sur vos tombeaux", refers to a book by Boris Vian under the pseudonym of Vernon Sullivan. This book provoked a controversy in 1947 because of its violent and sexual content. Several lyrics are inspired by poems by French author Pierre Reverdy: e.g., words "Nous ne marcherons plus ensemble" is an exact quote of the poem "Dans le monde étranger", "Dansent les flammes, les bras se lèvent" refer to the poem "Esprit pensant" and lyrics "Le monde comme une pendule, qui s'est arrêtée" seem to be inspired by the poem "Toujours là". The song also mentions the "angels", a recurrent theme in Farmer's songs.

In this song, Farmer says she "hopes for a better world, and confesses that she was perhaps misled glorifying misery. However, (...) [for her], that hope is just an inaccessible dream". "Rêver" ends in a different way from other Farmer's songs: not with the chorus, but with the phrase "J'ai rêvé qu'on pouvait s'aimer / J'avais rêvé du mot aimer". French author Erwan Chuberre says "Rêver" is probably one of the most moving songs of Farmer's directory.

Initially, a video in a studio version was scheduled, but finally a live version was produced (in two versions). The video shows images from the 1996 concert in which Farmer is wearing a golden dress.

== Live performances ==
A few time after the single release, Farmer performed the song in playback in one television show, Les Enfants de la guerre, on 27 November 1996, on TF1, in which she wore the same dress made by Paco Rabanne as that of 1996 concerts. The recording of the performance took place without the audience, which caused the anger of hundreds of fans who came from France and Belgium and who had waited several hours under the rain. This incident was widely reported in the press. "Rêver" was also sung in the NRJ Music Awards on 10 January 2003. These performance was carried out in live version accompanied by Yvan Cassar who played piano. It was the first time since 17 years that Farmer sang in live on television.

"Rêver" was performed during her last seven tours: 1996 Tour, Mylenium Tour, Avant que l'ombre... à Bercy, Mylène Farmer en tournée, Timeless, Mylène Farmer 2019 & Nevermore 2023. When Farmer sang this song at these occasions, she often wore a white dress, was accompanied by Cassar on the piano and sometimes wept. No choreography was used for these performances. On the 1999 tour, Farmer wore an orange costume composed of a privateer trousers, a thick jacket and orange shoes, with high heels. On the 2013 tour, Farmer closed the show with the song.

== Chart performance ==
The song entered the French Single Chart at number eight on 23 November 1996 and peaked at number seven the next week, thus becoming Farmer's 14th top ten hit in France. Then the single dropped and remained in the top 50 for 15 weeks. However, although sales were moderate, the single managed the album Anamorphosée to be able to reach number one for two weeks on the top album, one year and a half after its release, and was most aired on radio.

In Belgium (Wallonia), the song debuted at number 30 on the Ultratop 50 on 21 December 1996 and reached a peak of number 12, on 2 February 1997. It fell off the chart after 17 weeks, and was the 96th best-selling single of the year.

== Cover versions ==
In 2002, Gregorian covered the song in a 5:02 new age version which features on the album Masters of Chant Chapter II.

The most notable cover was recorded with a video in 2002 by Les Enfoirés for the album 2002: Tous dans le même bateau (track 17, 4:45). Among the artists who perform "Rêver", there are Francis Cabrel, Pascal Obispo, Marc Lavoine, Patrick Bruel, Muriel Robin and Maurane. In this version, Alizée sings alone the first verses.

Prohor Shalyapin, a former contestant of Russian television reality show Star Academy covered the song in Russian-language and his version is available on his own site.

== Formats and track listings ==
These are the formats and track listings of single releases of "Rêver":

- CD single

No.	Title	Length
1.	"Rêver" (radio edit)	4:42
2.	"Rêver" (1996 live version)	6:00

- CD maxi – Crystal case / CD maxi – Digipack / CD maxi – Promo

No.	Title	Length
1.	"Rêver" (radio edit)	4:42
2.	"Rêver" (the stripped dream mix)	5:10
3.	"Rêver" (1996 live version)	6:00
4.	"XXL" (UK remix)	9:00

- CD single – Promo

No.	Title	Length
1.	"Rêver" (radio edit)	4:42

- Digital download

No.	Title	Length
1.	"Rêver" (album version)	5:21
2.	"Rêver" (1996 live version)	8:26
3.	"Rêver" (2000 live version)	5:54
4.	"Rêver" (2006 live version)	8:04
5.	"Rêver" (2009 live version)	5:23

- VHS – Promo

No.	Title	Length
1.	"Rêver" (video)

== Release history ==
Date	Label	Region	Format	Catalog
October 1996	Polydor	France, Belgium	CD single – Promo	3459
October 1996	Polydor	France, Belgium	CD maxi – Promo	4480
October 1996	Polydor	France, Belgium	VHS Promo	—
16 November 1996	Polydor	France, Belgium	CD single	573 194–2
16 November 1996	Polydor	France, Belgium	CD maxi	573 195–2

== Official versions ==
Version	Length	Album	Remixed by	Year	Comment
Album version	5:22	Anamorphosée, Les Mots	—	1995	See the previous sections
Radio edit	4:42	—	Laurent Boutonnat	1996	The last refrain is deleted.
Stripped dream remix	5:10	—	Laurent Boutonnat	1996	The song begins with the sound of the wind and new percussions. It contains all the lyrics of the original version.
Live version (recorded in 1996)	8:27 (audio); 8:45 (video)	Live à Bercy	—	1996	This long version is very similar to the album version but more moving. Farmer speaks to the audience and sang the chorus in almost a cappella the chorus, then starts crying and apologizes for not being able to finish the song. The audience sings the chorus instead of her. See 1996 Tour
Music video	6:05	Music Videos II & III	—	1996	
Single live version	6:00	—	Laurent Boutonnat	1996	This version is identical to the live version available on Live à Bercy, but is shorter as the passage sung by fans and Farmer's words are deleted.
Live version (recorded in 2000)	5:56	Mylenium Tour	—	2000	The song is almost the same as the 1996 live version, but is shorter, and at the end of the song, the refrain is repeated with the audience. See Mylenium Tour
Live version (recorded in 2006)	7:42	Avant que l'ombre... à Bercy	—	2006	See Avant que l'ombre... à Bercy (tour)
Live version (recorded in 2009)	5:23	N°5 on Tour	—	2009	See Mylène Farmer en tournée

== Credits and personnel ==
These are the credits and the personnel as they appear on the back of the single:

- Mylène Farmer – lyrics
- Laurent Boutonnat – music
- Requiem Publishing – editions
- Polydor – recording company
- Karl Dickinson – photo
- Henry Neu – design

== Charts ==
=== Weekly charts ===
Chart (1996–97)	Peak position
Belgium (Ultratop 50 Wallonia)	12
Europe (European Hot 100 Singles)	37
France (SNEP)	7

=== Year-end charts ===
Chart (1997)	Position
Belgium (Ultratop 50 Wallonia)	96
