= California (Mylène Farmer song) =

Single by Mylène Farmer

from the album Anamorphosée
- Released: 26 March 1996
- Recorded: 1995
- Genre: Trip hop, pop rock, new jack swing
- Length: 3:58 (single version); 4:59 (album version)
- Label: Polydor
- Songwriters: Lyrics: Mylène Farmer; Music: Laurent Boutonnat
- Producer: Laurent Boutonnat

Mylène Farmer singles chronology
"L'Instant X" (1995)	"California" (1996)	"Comme j'ai mal" (1996)

"California" is a 1995 song recorded by the Canadian artist Mylène Farmer. It was the third single from her fourth studio album, Anamorphosée, and was released on 26 March 1996. The song marked her only collaboration with American movie screenwriter and director Abel Ferrara, who directed the very expensive music video in which Farmer appears both as a bourgeois woman and a prostitute. A tribute to California, the song is generally deemed one of Farmer's signature songs and has been performed during most of the singer's subsequent tours. It has met with relative success in France and Belgium, and became one of her hits in Russia.

== Background, writing and release ==
Farmer wanted to release "California", one of the most daring songs of the album, via the marketing for Anamorphosée. However, it was released many months after, as the third single, but was widely aired on radio. Many fans regard this song as one of the most emblematic of Farmer.

Among the different media for this single, there was a CD single distributed in a limited triptych digipack edition, and a CD maxi which contains six tracks – this one is the only CD maxi in Farmer's career still for sale because, based on the number of tracks, it is referenced by Universal as a "mini-album" and is re-edited. "California" was also released in Germany with a new white cover. The various remixes are the result of a collaboration between Laurent Boutonnat / Bertrand Châtenet ('LAPD remix' and 'wandering club mix'), and various American DJs: Niki Gasolino & Peter Parker, Nils Ruzicka, and Ramon Zenker. Two versions of the promotional CD were sent to radio stations on 29 February 1996; one of them, the luxurious edition, shows the outline of Farmer, which must be lifted to take out the CD. The designer Henry Neu said he was particularly proud of having created it.

The song is available on Anamorphosée in its original version, and on the best of Les Mots in the shorter radio version. The song is placed at the beginning of the second CD, just before "XXL" and "L'Instant X", which does not comply with the chronological order of release of the singles, mostly respected in the track-listing (but it was also the first song on the album). It was also remixed in 2003 by Romain Tranchart and Rawman for the compilation RemixeS.

== Lyrics and music ==
"California" is the only song from the album Anamorphosée to refer to its singular name ("Dans l'rétro, ma vie qui s'anamorphose"), and was the second of Farmer's songs with an English title, after "Beyond My Control". The song begins with different sounds evoking the street: a door that slams, an English voice in a loudspeaker, a siren of a police car. Farmer then referred to her desire to live in America to make a new start in her life. The song has a "nagging rhythm" and "Anglo-Saxon sonorities". Lyrics play with "anglicisms, sounds and onomatopoeia". According to the psychologist Hugues Royer, the song is "the symbol of the rebirth by the exile".

The song is a tribute to California. The lyrics display a highly elegant vocabulary, with an alternance of lines and puns in French and English. There are many literary references: for example, the phrase "Vienne la nuit et sonne l'heure et moi je meurs / Entre apathie et pesanteur où je demeure" alludes to the French poem Le Pont Mirabeau, written by Guillaume Apollinaire, which contains the verse "Vienne la nuit sonne l'heure / Les jours s'en vont je demeure".

== Music video ==
=== Production and plot ===
The video was directed by the American movie screenwriter and director Abel Ferrara. Producer Anouk Nora said that she first directly contacted the director. Then Farmer tried to contact him, particularly after seeing his film on a similar theme, Snake Eyes, with Madonna. In interviews, Farmer stated she phoned Ferrara many times, then they met in New York. She told him she wanted to play the role of a prostitute in the video, and eventually, she wrote the screenplay in collaboration with him. The video, a 5:18 Requiem Publishing production which cost about 600,000 euro, making it the most expensive music video of the year, was shot for three days and two nights in Los Angeles (on Sunset Boulevard). Ferrara was surprised and puzzled by Farmer's insistence that he direct. She offered 200,000 dollars to shoot a three-minute music video which eventually became a short film. Ferrara said he had a great respect for Farmer's professionalism.

The man who plays Farmer's lover is the American actor Giancarlo Esposito, and real prostitutes who appear in the video. Farmer said that she talked with the prostitutes before filming to learn more about prostitution and commented: "Freedom, for me, it may be a bitch who prostitutes on Hollywood Boulevard. (...) We all have a vulgar side in us that we repress. Sex is an integral part of our lives". She said she loved that role.

At the beginning of the video, a young, rich couple (Farmer and Esposito) is preparing to attend a reception. Meanwhile, a prostitute and a pimp (also played by Farmer and Esposito) are violently quarrelling. From her car, the rich woman looks at the prostitutes on the sidewalk and then sees her double threatened with a knife by her pimp who eventually murders her. After the society reception, the rich woman gets bored and goes to the toilet where she disguises herself as a prostitute and joins those outside. She makes love with the pimp and savagely kills him to avenge the murdered prostitute.

=== Comment and reception ===
The first images of the video were published by French magazine Voici, which had managed to illegally acquire some shots during the production. In an interview on Paris Première in 1996, Farmer explained that the video (which would be analyzed on Arte in July 2002), does not reflect her perception of California, adding: "It is a little caricature I would say. It is still polarized or focused on prostitution. Los Angeles is not only prostitution. [...] I always wanted to play a prostitute and I admit that for "California", it came spontaneously. And so I called Abel Ferrara who often evokes prostitution in his films." This was the last time that Marianne Rosenstiel photographed Farmer during filming. The video was aired for the first time on 20 March 1996, on M6.

According to biographer Bernard Violet, the video provides the message that "women love to sometimes turn into a sexual object, but they still have their pride", and compares the end of the video to the film Basic Instinct. Florence Rajon criticized the video, saying that the collaboration between the two artists (Ferrara and Farmer) was "more disappointing than seducing" and that "we can not really consider "California" as a masterpiece": the subject was "too exploitative" and "images of beautiful postcards of Hollywood are a bit too telephoned". By contrast, Royer deemed the video a "total success, in which are merging the dreamlike imaginary of Mylène and the brutal realism of Ferrara".

== Live performances ==
"California" was performed in lip-sync by Farmer in a single television show: Les Années tubes, broadcast on TF1 on 18 May 1996. For this occasion, the singer used lascivious choreography; she also performed "Sans contrefaçon".

The song was also performed during the 1996 tour in a remixed techno version (the 'Wandering mix'). Images of Los Angeles by night were shown on giant screens on stage, and Farmer, entirely dressed in gold, performed first alone, then with two female dancers, in a very suggestive choreography. The song was also performed in an acoustic and jazzy version during her 2000 tour. Farmer wore a white dress and white shoes. With her two female backing vocalists, she sat on a staircase, then got up and walked a few steps on the stage; then she went in front of the door at the top of the stairs, and at the end, she left the stage while it was in full black.

"California" was sung during the 13 concerts at Bercy in 2006. While the screens and the central cross showed the words "Crime scene. Do not cross", Farmer slowly descended the stairs of the stage and performed a dance with her hands during the musical bridge. The song was only performed in stadiums. Farmer wore a glittering short dress and red cape with hood, performing a choreography similar to that of the 1996 tour. This version is only available on the video version of the album N°5 on Tour.

== Critical reception ==
The author Erwan Chuberre considered "California" as "one of the best tracks of the album", and that the lyrics are "particularly exquisite and successful". Royer sees "California" as "an anthology piece, a musical gem all in subtlety."

In France, the song peaked at number 7 in the Top 50 on 30 May 1996. Sales declined rather slowly, and it remained in the top 50 for a total of 17 weeks. It was the third best-selling single from Anamorphosée. The song was also one of the most aired on radio in 1996 and was ranked number 63 on the end of year chart.

In Belgium (Wallonia), the single entered the Ultratop 50 Singles Chart on 4 May 1996, reaching number 22 on 3 August, which was the lowest peak position among the five singles from Anamorphosée. It remained in the list a total of 14 weeks, until it was dropped off the chart on 7 September, and was the 86th best-selling single of 1996.

== Cover versions ==
In 2004, Cedric, an unknown singer who participated in a programme on the radio station NRJ, covered the song in a R&B version. It was not released as a single.

== Formats and track listings ==
These are the formats and track listings of single releases of "California":

- CD single / CD single -Digipack

No.	Title	Length
1.	"California" (radio edit)	3:58
2.	"California" (Ramon Zenker's radio remix)	3:55

- CD maxi – Digipack

No.	Title	Length
1.	"California" (radio edit)	3:58
2.	"California" (Megalo Mania remix)	6:47
3.	"California" (wandering mix)	6:10
4.	"California" (L.A.P.D club remix)	6:55
5.	"California" (Ramon Zenker's extended remix)	5:55
6.	"California" (Gaspar Inc. remix)	5:20

- 12" maxi – Disc 1

No.	Title	Length
1.	"California" (radio edit)	3:58
2.	"California" (Megalo Mania remix)	6:47
3.	"California" (wandering mix)	6:10

- 12" maxi – Disc 2

No.	Title	Length
1.	"California" (L.A.P.D club remix)	6:55
2.	"California" (Ramon Zenker's extended remix)	5:55
3.	"California" (Gaspar Inc. remix)	5:20

- Digital download

No.	Title	Length
1.	"California" (album version)	4:59
2.	"California" (1996 live version)	7:12
3.	"California" (2000 live version)	5:27
4.	"California" (2006 live version)	5:19
5.	"California" (Romain Tranchart & Rawman remix)	6:17

- CD maxi – Germany

No.	Title	Length
1.	"California" (radio edit)	3:58
2.	"California" (Megalo Mania remix)	6:47
3.	"California" (wandering mix)	6:10
4.	"California" (L.A.P.D club remix)	6:55

- CD single – Promo / CD single – Promo – Luxurious edition / CD single – Promo – Germany

No.	Title	Length
1.	"California" (radio edit)	3:58

- VHS – Promo

No.	Title	Length
1.	"California" (video)

== Release history ==
Date	Label	Region	Format	Catalog
February 1996	Polydor	France, Belgium	CD single – Promo	3302, 3303
February 1996	Polydor	France, Belgium	VHS – Promo	—
February 1996	Polydor	Germany	CD single – Promo	576 096-2
26 March 1996	Polydor	France, Belgium	CD single	576 210-2
26 March 1996	Polydor	France, Belgium	7" maxi	576 381-1
26 March 1996	Polydor	France, Belgium	CD maxi	521 484-2
August 1996	Polydor	Germany	CD single, CD maxi	576 097-2

== Official versions ==
Version	Length	Album	Remixed by	Year	Comment
Album version	4:58	Anamorphosée	—	1995	See the previous sections
Radio edit	3:58	—	Laurent Boutonnat	1996	It is shorter than the album version, with a fade-out.
Ramon Zenker's radio remix	3:55	—	Ramon Zenker	1996	This version is much more accelerated, contains many "Chah ah ah ah ah" sung by Farmer, but the sounds at the beginning of the original song are deleted.
Ramon Zenker's extended remix	5:55	—	Ramon Zenker	1996	This version is similar to the 'Ramon Zenker's Radio Remix', but with more music.
Megalo Mania remix	6:47	—	Mega Lo Mania, aka Ramon Zenker and Nils Ruzicka	1996	This techno version, devoted to discothèques, contains an introduction in which the chorus is sung almost a cappella. All couplets are deleted.
Wandering mix	6:10	—	Laurent Boutonnat, Bertrand Châtenet	1996	This version is similar to the original version, with more "C'est sexy" and "So sex".
L.A.P.D. club remix	6:55	—	Laurent Boutonnat, Bertrand Châtenet	1996	This is a dance remix. The remix's title refers to the name of the Los Angeles Police Department and contains all the sounds from the original version, and many "C'est sexy" and "So sex".
Gaspar Inc. remix	5:20	—	Gaspar Inc.	1996	This is an instrumental version but very different from the album version. It contains many "Californie" sung by Farmer.
Music video	5:18	Music Videos II, Music Videos II & III	—	1996	
Live version (recorded in 1996)	7:30 (audio); 6:52 (video)	Live à Bercy	—	1996	The song begins with the various sounds that can be heard in the original album version, plus the sound of a helicopter, and ends with the sound of an ambulance siren. (see 1996 Tour)
Live version (recorded in 2000)	5:27	Mylenium Tour	—	2000	All the sounds from the album version are removed. (see Mylenium Tour (tour))
Album version	4:55	Les Mots	Laurent Boutonnat	2001	
Romain Tranchart & Rawman remix	6:17	RemixeS	Romain Tranchart & Rawman	2003	The song has a much more accelerated rhythm and contains more percussions.
Live version (recorded in 2006)	5:19	Avant que l'ombre... à Bercy	—	2006	See Avant que l'ombre... à Bercy (tour)
Live version (recorded in 2009)	4:25	N°5 on Tour (DVD)	—	2010	See Mylène Farmer en tournée
Live version (recorded in 2019)	6:10	Mylène Farmer 2019	—	2019	See Mylène Farmer 2019

== Credits and personnel ==
These are the credits and the personnel as they appear on the back of the single:

- Mylène Farmer – lyrics
- Laurent Boutonnat – music
- Requiem Publishing – editions
- Claude Gassian – photo
- Com'N.B – design

== Charts ==
=== Weekly charts ===
Chart (1996)	Peak position
Belgium (Ultratop 50 Wallonia)	22
Europe (European Hot 100 Singles)	35
France (SNEP)	7
Quebec (ADISQ)	7

=== Year-end charts ===
Chart (1996)	Position
Belgium (Ultratop 50 Wallonia)	86
France (SNEP)	63
