= Souviens-toi du jour =

Single by Mylène Farmer

from the album Innamoramento
- B-side: "Remix"
- Released: 2 September 1999
- Recorded: 1999, France
- Genre: Dance-pop, pop rock, house
- Length: 4:55 (single version); 5:03 (album version)
- Label: Polydor
- Songwriters: Lyrics: Mylène Farmer; Music: Laurent Boutonnat
- Producer: Laurent Boutonnat

Mylène Farmer singles chronology
"Je te rends ton amour" (1999)	"Souviens-toi du jour" (1999)	"Optimistique-moi" (2000)

"Souviens-toi du jour" (English: "Remember the Day") is a 1999 song recorded by French singer-songwriter Mylène Farmer. It was the third single from her fifth studio album Innamoramento and was released on 2 September 1999. Inspired by Primo Levi's book If This Is a Man, the song deals with the theme of the Holocaust. The song is perhaps best remembered for its controversial music video, which was generally viewed as disrespectful towards its own subject matter.

== Background, writing and release ==
Initially, Farmer wanted to release the ballad "Et si vieillir m'était conté" as third single from the album Innamoramento. However, although promotional plans were already made, she changed her mind and preferred to release "Souviens-toi du jour", as her record label Universal wanted to market a rhythmic single to obtain higher sales than that of the previous single, "Je te rends ton amour".

The song was much broadcast on radio, reaching a peak of number eight on French airplay chart four months after the promotional CD had been sent. Some radios stations, including NRJ, aired the 'sweet guitar mix' version of the song.

Among the various promotional formats, there was an orange envelope released on 2 September 1999. This envelope contains a silvery pocket within which there are seven stones transparent. This is undoubtedly a "reference to the symbol of memory in the Jewish religion".

== Lyrics and music ==
The song openly refers to Primo Levi's book If This Is a Man, in which the author recounts his experience in the concentration camps. On the back of the cover of the various formats, words in Hebrew "Zokher eth Ayom" are written and are also part of the lyrics. Farmer explained in an interview : "It is in Hebrew and it means exactly "Remember the Day", it is in the Torah. When I wrote this song, because (...) I have a bedside book called If This Is a Man precisely by Primo Levi, and which evokes the deportation and I wanted to talk about that (...), there are several possible readings but that's what I thought and to this idea, the need to remember these things." However, as stated by Instant-Mag, the song is "full of hope and resolutely turned towards the potentiality of human beings to overcome its hatred", while the book seeks to "prove that the concentration camps were able to make the man inhuman, removing the brotherhood and mutual aid". In its lyrics, "Souviens-toi du jour" is "the continuation and the antithesis of "Désenchantée", and is a plea for an alternation, a sublimated power, held by an ideal". Some words of the song also refer to a poem by French author Pierre Reverdy, Esprit pesant.

== Music video ==
Mylène Farmer in the much debated videoclip "Souviens-toi du jour". Her transparent dress and her suggestive positions was considered as a lack of respect toward the Holocaust.

The video's screenplay was written by Farmer, and is a Requiem Publishing and Stuffed Monkey production, like all her previous singles, and was directed by Marcus Nispel, who had previously worked with the singer on "XXL", "L'Instant X" and "Comme j'ai mal". It was shot over the course of two days in Los Angeles, and cost about 100,000 euros. The video was first broadcast on 21 September 1999, when the Mylenium Tour started.

The video, which shows an apartment and its old furniture as they catch fire, was filmed in a building destined for destruction. Among the things that burn, there are a clock, a painting and some books, including Hitler's Mein Kampf and other German ideological books, and letters of the singer, as shows it the address on the envelopes. Farmer wore a dress in plastic made by Thierry Mugler which had been worn by the singer when she performed "Ainsi soit-je..." in August 1997, and which began to melt during the shooting of the video, as it had difficulty to withstand heat. Because of risks linked to the fire, there were firefighters present on the shooting. Images of the video do not follow the chronological order of events, as some furniture are shown intact after being burned.

This video is among the least appreciated by critics, partly due to its perceived lack of respect towards the Holocaust, as Farmer stands in suggestive positions, and her clothes are almost transparent. According to author Erwan Chuberre, the video "was made somewhat in haste and with modest means". French magazine Instant-Mag said about the video: "The quality, good taste and value of this short film are frankly debatable. Not only it doesn't contribute towards the work, but moreover, it has a certain vibe that it was shot in a hurry, with a cock-and-bull accumulation of colorful images, which also have very little to do with the theme of the song. The gap is rather embarrassing, even oppressive, and some people find it downright insulting and inappropriate". Farmer's position on a sofa, elbows resting on knees and head bowed as to protect herself from fire at the very end of the video, would be inspired by the text Le Brasier, written by French poet Guillaume Apollinaire, in which it can be read: "Et pour toujours je suis assis dans un fauteuil (...) / Les flammes ont poussé sur moi comme des feuilles."("And for ever I'm sitting in an armchair (...) / The flames pushed on me like leaves.")

== Chart performances ==
In France, "Souviens-toi du jour" debuted at a peak position in the French SNEP Singles Chart, on 2 October 1999 when it directly entered the chart at number four. Despite its initial success, the single fell rather quickly the next weeks, although it managed to have a longer stretch in the top 50 (15 weeks) than the two previous singles from the album. It spent a total of 22 weeks in the top 100 and ranked at number 79 in the 1999 Annual Chart. Certified silver single by the SNEP, "Souviens-toi du jour" was the best-selling single released from the album Innamoramento.

In Belgium, the single appeared for nine weeks in the Ultratop 50, from 9 October to 4 December 1999, with a peak at number 18 in the third week and was ranked at number 99 on 1999 End of the year chart.

== Live performances ==
Farmer promoted the song in two French television shows : Tapis rouge, broadcast on 11 September 1999 on France 2, and 100% Johnny, on 12 November 1999 on TF1, as Farmer was personally invited by Johnny Hallyday.

"Souviens-toi du jour" was performed during the 2000 concerts tour with a simple choreography referring to the universal sign language, with her eight dancers. She wore a red dress with a very long train. After performing the song, Farmer congratulated the audience and said goodbye, then twice repeated the chorus with the audience. This performance was included on the live album and the DVD Mylenium Tour.

== Formats and track listings ==
These are the formats and track listings of single releases of "Souviens-toi du jour":

- CD single

No.	Title	Length
1.	"Souviens-toi du jour" (single version)	4:55
2.	"Souviens-toi du jour" (Royal G's radio mix)	3:58

- CD maxi – Digipack

No.	Title	Length
1.	"Souviens-toi du jour" (single version)	4:55
2.	"Souviens-toi du jour" (Royal G's club mix)	6:55
3.	"Souviens-toi du jour" (sweet guitar mix)	4:11
4.	"Souviens-toi du jour" (remember mix)	5:18

- 12" maxi / 12" maxi – Promo

No.	Title	Length
1.	"Souviens-toi du jour" (Royal G's club mix)	6:55
2.	"Souviens-toi du jour" (sweet guitar mix)	4:11
3.	"Souviens-toi du jour" (single version)	4:55
4.	"Souviens-toi du jour" (remember mix)	5:18

- Digital download

No.	Title	Length
1.	"Souviens-toi du jour" (album version)	5:03
2.	"Souviens-toi du jour" (2000 live version)	5:18

- CD single – Promo / CD single – Promo – Luxurious envelope

No.	Title	Length
1.	"Souviens-toi du jour" (single version)	4:55

- DVD – Promo

No.	Title	Length
1.	"Souviens-toi du jour" (video)	5:07

== Release history ==
Date	Label	Region	Format	Catalog
31 August 1999	Polydor	France, Belgium	CD single – Promo	9214
31 August 1999	Polydor	France, Belgium	7" maxi – Promo	0218
Early September 1999	Polydor	France, Belgium	VHS – Promo	—
28 September 1999	Polydor	France, Belgium	CD single	561 444-2
28 September 1999	Polydor	France, Belgium	7" maxi	561 445-1
28 September 1999	Polydor	France, Belgium	CD maxi	561 445-2

== Official versions ==
Version	Length	Album	Remixed by	Year	Comment
Album / Single version	4:55	Innamoramento, Les Mots	—	1999	See the previous sections
Radio edit	4:20	—	Laurent Boutonnat	1999	This version is shorter on the end.
Royal G's radio mix	3:58	—	Royal Garden Sound	1999	Farmer's voice is put forward. This version is slower than the album one.
Royal G's club mix	6:55	—	Royal Garden Sound	1999	This dance and techno version includes the whole lyrics from the original version.
Sweet guitar mix	4:11	—	Royal Garden Sound	1999	This jazzy version, accompanied by guitars, includes the whole of lyrics from the original version.
Sweet guitar mix (short version)	3:45	—	Royal Garden Sound	1999	It is the same version than the 'sweet guitar mix', with one refrain is deleted.
Remember mix	5:18	—	Stray Dog Music	1999	This version is the most rhythm one of all the remixes of "Souviens-toi du jour". Farmer sings in Hebrew during the musical bridge.
Music video	5:07	Music Videos III, Music Videos II & III	—	1999	
Live version (recorded in 2000)	5:17 (audio); 7:48 (video)	Mylenium Tour	—	2000	This live version is very similar to that of the album. On the DVD and VHS, there is one refrain added. (see Mylenium Tour)

== Credits and personnel ==
These are the credits and the personnel as they appear on the back of the single:

- Mylène Farmer – lyrics
- Laurent Boutonnat – music
- Requiem Publishing – editions
- Polydor – recording company
- Claude Gassian – photo
- Henry Neu / Com'N.B – design
- Made in the E.U.

== Charts ==
=== Weekly charts ===
Chart (1999)	Peak position
Belgium (Ultratop 50 Wallonia)	18
Europe (European Hot 100 Singles)	20
France (SNEP)	4

=== Year-end charts ===
Chart (1999)	Position
Belgium (Ultratop 50 Wallonia)	99
Belgium Francophone (Ultratop 50 Wallonia)	39
France (SNEP)	79

== Certifications ==
Region	Certification	Certified units/sales
France (SNEP)	Silver	125,000^{*}
^{*} Sales figures based on certification alone.
