= Mylenium Tour =

Mylènium Tour

Live album by Mylène Farmer
- Released: 2000
- Recorded: Paris
- Genre: Pop, rock
- Label: Polydor
- Producer: Laurent Boutonnat

Mylène Farmer chronology
Innamoramento (1999)	Mylènium Tour (2000)	Les Mots (2001)

Alternative cover
- Collector edition – Statue

Singles from Mylenium Tour
- 1. "Dessine-moi un mouton" Released: 5 December 2000

Mylènium Tour is the third live album by Mylène Farmer, released on 5 December 2000.

== Background ==
After having ending her third successful tour whose last shows were held in Russia on 7 March 2000, Farmer rested, and then decided to release an album and a DVD retracing her concert. With Bertrand Châtenet, she participated in the audio mixing of the live album and also worked on the bonus available on the DVD. The album, whose release was originally scheduled for September, was finally marketed on 4 December, after several postponements, since its preparation needed a lot of time. The day before, the Fnac and Virgin stores of the Champs-Elysées organized a special evening by opening at midnight to allow fans to purchase the various supports of the album and the only single "Dessine-moi un mouton" which was released at the same time.

The album privileges the songs from the previous studio album Innamoramento, but also contains some songs from Anamorphosée and L'Autre..., and two B-sides. A medley composed of 1980s four hits of the first two albums is also available on the album.

Arranged by Yvan Cassar and produced by François Hanss, Mylenium Tour is the only album, which was not produced by Laurent Boutonnat.

== Commercial performance ==
In France, the CD went straight to number one on French Albums Chart, on 9 December 2000. It was dethroned the week after, but managed to stay on the top ten for 11 weeks. It disappeared from the chart (Top 200) on 8 September 2001, after its 31st week of attendance. On 26 September 2001, the album was certified Double platinum album for a minimum of 600,000 sales. It peaked respectively at #17 (it was released only three weeks before the end of the year) and #39 on 2000 and 2001 French Albums Charts. The VHS and the DVD, also released in December 2000, were both certified Diamond videos for more than 100,000 copies sold (350,000 sales).

In Belgium Wallonia, the album entered the chart on 16 December 2000, at #14. It reached then #8, its highest position, but immediately left the top ten and remained on the chart (Top 50) for 13 weeks. It was ranked #68 on 2000 End of the Year Chart. On the chart edition of 30 April 2005, the album re-appeared for a single week, at #50, thanks to the release of Avant que l'ombre....

In Switzerland, the album achieved a minor success: it peaked at #31, on 17 December 2000, then kept on dropping and remained for seven weeks in the top 50 and for 12 weeks in the top 100.

== Track listing ==
Disc one
No.	Title	Lyrics	Music	Original album	Length
1.	"Mylenium"	Mylène Farmer	Laurent Boutonnat	Innamoramento	6:10
2.	"L'Amour naissant"	Farmer	Boutonnat	Innamoramento	5:28
3.	"L'Âme-stram-gram"	Farmer	Boutonnat	Innamoramento	6:00
4.	"Beyond My Control"	Farmer	Boutonnat	L'autre...	5:18
5.	"Rêver"	Farmer	Boutonnat	Anamorphosée	5:56
6.	"Il n'y a pas d'ailleurs"	Farmer	Boutonnat	L'autre...	4:33
7.	"Mylène Is Calling"	Farmer	Boutonnat	-	2:15
8.	"Optimistique-moi"	Farmer	Farmer	Innamoramento	5:34
9.	"Medley (Pourvu qu'elles soient douces / Maman a tort / Libertine / Sans contrefaçon)"	Farmer, Boutonnat	Boutonnat, Jean-Claude Dequéant, Jérôme Dahan	Cendres de lune Ainsi soit je...	4:22
10.	"Regrets"	Farmer	Boutonnat	L'autre...	6:49

Disc two
No.	Title	Lyrics	Music	Original album	Length
1.	"Désenchantée"	Mylène Farmer	Laurent Boutonnat	L'autre...	6:44
2.	"Méfie-toi"	Farmer	Farmer	Innamoramento	5:40
3.	"Dessine-moi un mouton"	Farmer	Boutonnat	Innamoramento	4:50
4.	"California"	Farmer	Boutonnat	Anamorphosée	5:27
5.	"Pas le temps de vivre"	Farmer	Boutonnat	Innamoramento	7:08
6.	"Je te rends ton amour"	Farmer	Boutonnat	Innamoramento	5:15
7.	"Souviens-toi du jour"	Farmer	Boutonnat	Innamoramento	5:18
8.	"Dernier Sourire"	Farmer	Boutonnat	-	4:53
9.	"Innamoramento"	Farmer	Boutonnat	Innamoramento	4:39

=== VHS/DVD ===
1. "Mylenium" (6:40)
2. "L'Amour naissant" (5:26)
3. "L'Âme-stram-gram" (5:43)
4. "Beyond My Control" (5:21)
5. "Rêver" (5:55)
6. "Il n'y a pas d'ailleurs" (5:17)
7. "Mylène Is Calling" (2:20)
8. "Optimistique-moi" (5:43)
9. "Medley": "Pourvu qu'elles soient douces" / "Libertine" / "Maman a tort" / "Sans contrefaçon" (6:45)
10. "Regrets" (5:07)
11. "Désenchantée" (7:54)"
12. "Méfie-toi" (5:51)
13. "Dessine-moi un mouton" (6:40)
14. "California" (5:17)
15. "Pas le temps de vivre" (8:26)
16. "Je te rends ton amour" (5:16)
17. "Souviens-toi du jour" (7:48)
18. "Dernier Sourire" (5:23)
19. "Innamoramento" (6:49)
20. Générique de fin (4:28)

Notes

- ^{2} Only on the DVD
- "Made in USA" (Dans les coulisses) (8:50), "Band & dancers" (3:40), "326 seconds" (Avant le show) (5:31), "Vous..." (4:50), "Made in Russia" (8:08)^{2}
- Bonus multi-angles: "L'Amour naissant" (4:38), "L'Âme-stram-gram" (4:27), "Rêver" (4:20)^{2}

== Personnel ==
For more details about credits and personnel, see: Mylenium Tour (tour)

- Laurent Boutonnat – music
- Yvan Cassar – musical direction, keyboards
- Éric Chevalier – keyboards
- Jeff Dahlgren, Brian Ray – guitars
- Jerry Watts Jr – bass
- Abraham Laboriel Jr – drums
- Johanna Manchec-Ferdinand – background vocals
- Esther Dobong'Na Essiène (aka Estha Divine) – background vocals
- Philippe Rault for Basilic Production Inc. – consultant
- Stuffed Monkey – production
- Bertrand Châtenet – mixing
- Jérôme Devoise – assistant
- Thierry Rogen – sound
- Tim Young for Metropolis (London) – mastering
- Paul van Parys for Stuffed Monkey – executive producer
- Thierry Suc – management
- Claude Gassian – photos
- Henry Neu / Com'N.B – design
- Recorded at Studio Mobile "Le Voyageur II"
- Mixed at Studio Guillaume Tell

== Charts ==
=== Weekly album charts ===
Initial weekly chart performance for Mylenium Tour
Chart (2000–2001)	Peak position
Belgian Albums (Ultratop Wallonia)	8
European Albums (Music & Media)	20
French Albums (SNEP)	1
Swiss Albums (Schweizer Hitparade)	31

2005 weekly chart performance for Mylenium Tour
Chart (2005)	Peak position
Belgian Albums (Ultratop Wallonia)	50

2021 weekly chart performance for Mylenium Tour
Chart (2021)	Peak position
Belgian Albums (Ultratop Wallonia)	185

2023 weekly chart performance for Mylenium Tour
Chart (2023)	Peak position
Swiss Albums (GfK Romandy)	47

=== Weekly DVD charts ===
Chart (2004–10)	Peak position
Belgian DVDs (Ultratop Wallonia)	2
French Music DVD (SNEP)	7

=== Year-end album charts ===
2000 year-end chart performance for Mylenium Tour
Chart (2000)	Position
French Albums (SNEP)	17

2001 year-end chart performance for Mylenium Tour
Chart (2001)	Position
Belgian Albums (Ultratop Wallonia)	68
Belgian Francophone Albums (Ultratop Wallonia)	35
French Albums (SNEP)	39

=== Year-end DVD charts ===
Chart (2004)	Position
Belgian DVDs (Ultratop Wallonia)	39
Chart (2006)	Position
French DVDs (SNEP)	57
Chart (2009)	Position
French DVDs (SNEP)	55
Chart (2010)	Position
French DVDs (SNEP)	59

== Certifications and sales ==
Region	Certification	Certified units/sales
Album
Belgium (BRMA)	Gold	25,000^{*}
France (SNEP)	2× Platinum	600,000^{*}
DVD
Belgium (BRMA)	Gold	25,000^{*}
France (SNEP)	Diamond	100,000^{*}
^{*} Sales figures based on certification alone.

== Formats ==
Audio

- Double CD – Brass case
- Double CD – Collector edition with additional photos (30,000)
- Double CD – Promo
- Double CD – Promo – Statue
- Triple 12"
- Cassette – Double length^{1}
- Double CD – Crystal case – Canada

^{1} Doesn't contain "Il n'y a pas d'ailleurs", "Mylène Is Calling" and "California"

Video

- VHS
  - Plastic case with golden border
  - Plastic case with dark golden border
- DVD
