= L'Instant X =

Single by Mylène Farmer

from the album Anamorphosée
- B-side: "Alice (Arachnostring Version)"
- Released: 12 December 1995
- Recorded: 1995, Los Angeles
- Genre: Rock
- Length: 4:44 (album version); 4:10 (single version)
- Label: Polydor
- Songwriters: Lyrics: Mylène Farmer; Music: Laurent Boutonnat
- Producer: Laurent Boutonnat

Mylène Farmer singles chronology
"XXL" (1995)	"L'Instant X" (1995)	"California" (1996)
Je t'aime mélancolie (Felix Da Housecat remix) (2003)	L'Instant X (the X key mix by One-T) (2003)	Fuck Them All (2005)

Alternative cover
- 2003 version by One-T

"L'Instant X" (English: "The X Moment") is a 1995 song recorded by the French artist Mylène Farmer. It was the second single from her fourth album Anamorphosée and was released on 12 December 1995. Directed by Marcus Nispel in New York, the music video humorously depicts the apocalypse and shows Farmer bathing in foam. The song became the biggest hit from the album, reaching number six in France. In January 2004, the song was the subject of a remix produced by One-T and was released as promotional single.

== Backgroung and writing ==
After the mixed success of her single "XXL" and the relatively poor chart performances of the Anamorphosée album, Farmer decided to release a second single, "L'Instant X", for the Christmas period. The song's title comes from an expression in the first verse. The chorus is a callback to Tino Rossi's Christmas song "Petit Papa Noël", as in the lyrics Farmer scans, in jerky syllabes, "Papa Noël, quand tu descendras du ciel...", which are also the lyrics of the chorus in Rossi's song.

For the first time throughout Farmer's career, all the remixes available on the various formats were not produced exclusively by Laurent Boutonnat and his team: only two of them were made by Laurent Boutonnat and Bertrand Châtenet, while the other two, in a style closer to eurodance, were produced by Ramon Zenker. The 'Have an Instant X remix' was considered by French author Julien Rigal "probably one of the best remixes" outside Boutonnat's ones. The second track on the CD single is a jazz-oriented remixed version of "Alice", another song from the Anamorphosée album. Unlike many of Farmer's singles, there is no instrumental version on the various formats. The image used on the cover was likely influenced by Ross Hunter's 1966 film Madame X.

On 21 January 2004, the song was remixed by One-T for the compilation RemixeS. Devoted to discothèques, this version was released as 7" maxi, becoming the third single from the RemixeS album, after "Sans contrefaçon" and "Je t'aime mélancolie". It was the most broadcast single from the album.

== Lyrics and music ==
As noted by author Erwan Chuberre, "L'Instant X" is different from Farmer's other songs because the singer uses a deeper voice than usual, and lyrics deal with things of everyday life, not romantic literary references. Journalist Caroline Bee stated that it is "a rock song that recalls "Je t'aime mélancolie" in its construction and its cynicism". Journalist Benoît Cachin said that the lyrics evoke with humour and irony the year 2000, on the significance of which many people got lost in conjectures, but which Farmer herself sees as bringing much joy. He noted that in the lyrics, Farmer refers to group U2's rock song "Sunday Bloody Sunday" in the phrase "Bloody lundi". The refrain is addressed to Father Christmas, comparing him to the Messiah, quotes André Malraux (who wrote "le XXIè siècle sera spirituel ou ne sera pas"), mentions the women's magazine Elle, the River Styx in the Greek mythology, and the antidepressant Prozac (in verlan). According to Rigal, the lyrics can have multiple meanings: they seem to address "the lack of latent spirituality through a concentration of bad elements", but they may also be "a pamphlet on women menstruation". According to psychologist Hugues Royer, the song "talks about the state in which a person bogs down in the anticipation of the magic formula that will allow him to leave his torpor." He added that the song also contains some humor with such unexpected images as "J'ai un teint de poubelle" or "Mon chat qui s'défenestre".

== Music video ==
Mylène Farmer in the foam, wearing the dress made by French fashion designer Jean-Paul Gaultier, in the music video "L'Instant X"

As "XXL", the video was directed by Marcus Nispel who also wrote the screenplay. This Requiem Publishing production was film in Los Angeles and New York for three days — one for Farmer, the two others for the extras — and cost about 80,000 euros. In addition to the version broadcast on television, there was another video of "L'instant X", a first editing which only contains shots featuring Farmer, including some shots which were not included in the final video. The producer Anouk Nora explained: "We shot [the video] in February by -10 degrees [celsius] in New York. Mylène was completely frozen and took a bath in foam as if she was under the Tropics". Some photos taken by Claude Gassian during the shooting of the video were used, slightly touched up, for the cover of the 2001 album I Poo Poo on Your Juju by North-American rock band The Third Eye Foundation. The small towel worn by Farmer was made by French fashion designer Jean-Paul Gaultier. Farmer explained that she liked the idea of the foam pouring as it reminded her parties in Ibiza.

In this video, Farmer, wearing heavy make-up, is lying on a cloud, and frolics in the foam. Under the cloud, the city of New York, the Statue of Liberty, the Twin Towers and all the buildings are in turn covered with foam, symbolizing the apocalypse. The singer, who is outside of the disaster, seems to delight in this situation. However, the video ends by showing survivors who go off into the sunset.

This video premiered on television on 17 December 1995 in the French show Déjà le retour; but in an early version in which only the singer appears. It was not much appreciated by her fans, and Rigal considered the video "disappointing". The foam in which Farmer rolls has been viewed as a symbol of orgasm, as it does in French literature, and more frequently as a major cleanup before a new start. About the video, Farmer said: "I wanted to retrace one day we can have, where everything goes wrong. It is a concentration of events as soon as we get up... and everything goes wrong again! And we expect that time and it often happens that in a day or, or in a month, at a time when all things come to concentrate a bit like a puzzle, and this is when all this time redounds upwards rather than downwards".

== Live performances ==
In late 1995, Farmer featured in two television shows to promote the song without singing; she was only interviewed on Studio Gabriel (14 December, France 2) in which she announced her next tour, and on Déjà le retour (17 December, France 2). She lip-synched "L'Instant X" on two other programs: Le Bêtisier du samedi soir, (13 January 1996, France 2), and Top aux Carpentier (9 March 1996, TF1). At this last occasion, Farmer shared a kiss on the mouth with her two female dancers during the musical bridge (similar to the kiss Madonna shared with Britney Spears and Christina Aguilera at the 2003 MTV Video Music Awards, which sparked a much bigger controversy in the USA seven years later).

"L'Instant X" was first performed on stage on the 1996 tour. The hall was fully in the dark when the song began, and only Farmer, who wore a flesh-colored pants, was then in the light. She performed a very suggestive choreography with her female dancers, and moved throughout all the stage during the song. The song was also performed during the 2009 Mylène Farmer en tournée tour, only in stadium venues, during the Black and White act. Farmer wore a white tutu and pinstripe trousers, the stage was fully dark with two lights on her, and the screens started showing "X's" and a countdown till she started singing. Susie Davis, who previously worked with Patti Smith and Sinéad O'Connor, participated in the background vocals of this live version.

== Chart performances ==
In France, "L'Instant X" debuted at number 9 on 16 December 1995, and dropped the next three weeks. It reached again the top ten and peaked at number six on 20 January, and remained for eight weeks in the top ten and 20 weeks in the top 50. The single was the best-selling single from the Anamorphosée album, with the longest chart trajectory. The song ranked 67th on the 1996 year-end chart. According to Royer, the song "allowed the singer to reconnect with success and to set the groundwork for a comeback on stage". In April 2018, the song was re-edited under new formats then re-entered the chart at number eight.

"L'Instant X" remained for 21 weeks on the Belgian Ultratop 50 Singles Chart and reached a peak of number 12 on 17 February and 30 March. The single was Farmer's second longest charting single in Belgium, behind "Slipping Away (Crier la vie)". It was the 49th best-selling single of 1996 in the country.

In 2004, the remixed version by One-T was aired in Russia.

== Cover versions ==
The song was covered by Michał Kwiatkowski and Sofia Essaïdi, on 30 October 2003, in French show Star Academy France, but this version was not released as a single.

== B-side: "Alice" ==
The B-side of the CD single is a remixed version of another track of the album, "Alice" (this version appears as third track on the promotional CD maxi of "Comme j'ai mal" released in Germany, and under the name of 'new mix' as bonus on the Japan release of the album).

The song seems inspired by Ovid's Metamorphoses. "Alice" is the personification of a spider to which Farmer speaks directly in the chorus. According to journalist Benoît Cachin, this arachnid is in the song "the friend of a depressive artist", and Farmer explained in an interview that it represents "the self-destruction that prevents the artist to create". The song includes neologisms and the meaning is often difficult to understand. In the verses, Farmer is whispering.

The song has never been performed on television, but it was sung during the 1996 series of concerts at Bercy. Farmer was then seated on a giant metal spider that came down from heaven and slowly landed on the stage.

== Formats and track listings ==
These are the formats and track listings of single releases of "L'Instant X":

- CD single

No.	Title	Length
1.	"L'Instant X" (single version)	4:10
2.	"Alice" (arachnostring version)	5:20

- CD maxi

No.	Title	Length
1.	"L'Instant X" (single version)	4:10
2.	"L'Instant X" (santa's hard re-x-mix)	6:00
3.	"L'Instant X" (Ramon Zenker club dub re-mix)	5:26
4.	"L'Instant X" (have an Instant X mix)	7:05
5.	"L'Instant X" (Ramon Zenker groove trop re-mix)	5:39

- 12" maxi

No.	Title	Length
1.	"L'Instant X" (santa's hard re-x-mix)	6:00
2.	"L'Instant X" (have an Instant X mix)	7:05
3.	"L'Instant X" (Ramon Zenker groove trop re-mix)	5:26
4.	"L'Instant X" (Ramon Zenker club dub re-mix)	5:39

- CD single - Promo

No.	Title	Length
1.	"L'Instant X" (single version)	4:25

- VHS - Promo

No.	Title	Length
1.	"L'Instant X" (video)	4:12

- 7" single / 7" maxi / 7" single - Promo

No.	Title	Length
1.	"L'Instant X" (the X key - by One-T)

== Official versions ==
Version	Length	Album	Remixed by	Year	Comment
"L'Instant X"
Album version	4:45	Anamorphosée	—	1995	See the previous sections
Single version	4:10	—	Laurent Boutonnat	1995	This version is shorter than the album one, with a fade-out end.
Santa's hard re-x-mix	6:00	—	Laurent Boutonnat	1995	Laughs can be heard at the beginning of the song, the bell sounds were deleted, and only chorus and the first verse are retained in this version.
Ramon Zenker groove trop re-mix	5:26	—	Ramon Zenker	1995	This is an electronic version which contains all the lyrics.
Ramon Zenker club dub re-mix	5:39	—	Ramon Zenker	1995	This is a dance version which contains only "C'est l'instant X" and "Papa" as lyrics.
Have an Instant X mix	7:05	—	Laurent Boutonnat	1995	This is the more dance remix of the song which contains many laughs and bell sounds.
Music video	5:18	Music Videos II, Music Videos II & III	—	1995	
Live version (recorded in 1996)	9:36 (CD, video); 4:54 (cassette)	Live à Bercy	—	1996	See 1996 Tour
Album version	4:45	Les Mots	Laurent Boutonnat	2001	The last guitar riff is deleted.
The X key mix	3:43	RemixeS	One-T	2003	This version adds different noises, including the sound of a revolver when Farmer is singing "Humeur killer".
"Alice"
Album version	5:20	Anamorphosée	—	1995	See the previous section
Arachnostring version / New mix	5:20	—	Laurent Boutonnat	1996	Some scratchings are added and Farmer's voice ends in fade in.
Live version (recorded in 1996)	5:25	Live à Bercy	—	1996	This version is almost identical to the album/arachnostring one.

== Credits and personnel ==
These are the credits and the personnel as they appear on the back of the single:

- Mylène Farmer – lyrics
- Laurent Boutonnat – music
- Requiem Publishing – editions
- Polydor – recording company
- Herb Ritts – photo
- Com'N.B – design

== Charts ==
=== Weekly charts ===
Chart (1995–96)	Peak position
Belgium (Ultratop 50 Wallonia)	12
Europe (European Hot 100 Singles)	26
France (SNEP)	6
Quebec (ADISQ)	20
Chart (2018)	Peak position
France (SNEP)	8

Weekly chart performance for "L'Instant X" (One-T Remix)
Chart (2004)	Peak position
CIS Airplay (TopHit)	81
Russia Airplay (TopHit)	69

=== Year-end charts ===
Chart (1996)	Position
Belgium (Ultratop 50 Wallonia)	49
France (SNEP)	67

== Release history ==
Region	Date	Format
France, Belgium, Switzerland	November 1995	Promo CD single
France, Belgium, Switzerland	12 December 1995	CD single, CD maxi, 12" maxi
France, Belgium, Switzerland	21 January 2004	7" single
