= Innamoramento =

Studio album by Mylène Farmer
- Released: 7 April 1999
- Recorded: Record One, Los Angeles; Ocean Way Recording. Inc., Hollywood
- Genres: Synthpop, pop rock
- Length: 64:34
- Label: Polydor
- Producer: Laurent Boutonnat

Mylène Farmer chronology
Live à Bercy (1997)	Innamoramento (1999)	Mylenium Tour (2000)

Alternative cover
- Collector edition

Singles from Innamoramento
- 1. "L'Âme-stram-gram" Released: 9 March 1999; 2. "Je te rends ton amour" Released: 8 June 1999; 3. "Souviens-toi du jour" Released: 2 September 1999; 4. "Optimistique-moi" Released: 22 February 2000; 5. "Innamoramento" Released: 18 July 2000

Innamoramento is the fifth studio album by Mylène Farmer, released on 7 April 1999. With sales of 1.5 million, the album is one of the singer's most successful ones. It reached Diamond status in France and landed Farmer a number of awards, including Album of the Year at the 1st NRJ Music Awards. On the heels of the album's success, Farmer was also named Best Female French-language Artist in two consecutive years: 2000 and 2001.

== Background and release ==
By 1999, Farmer had barely appeared in the media since her 1996 concerts at Paris-Bercy. The singer spent most of this time traveling many countries (such as China, Ireland, Italy and the United States), where she drew her inspiration for her next album, giving it a greater ethnic orientation. She was also inspired by the books Falling In Love by Francesco Alberoni, If This Is a Man by Primo Levi, and books on Buddhism. While some media announced that the album would be called Immortelles, Mes Moires (according to the magazine Voici), Mémoires and Ensemble, rumor had it that the next album would have more techno sound (and the first single would be named "The Small World", according to the Belgian newspaper 7 Extra). It was recorded at studios Ocean Way Recording and Record One in Los Angeles, but mixed at Guillaume Tell studio in Paris.

Finally, the album was released on 7 April, almost a month after the lead single "L'Âme-stram-gram" and was named Innamoramento, in reference to the book by Francesco Alberoni mentioned above. A quote from the author is also cited on the first page of the album's booklet. The photographs, produced by Marino Parisotto Vay, cost about 104,000 euros. The cover shows Farmer dressed in white on top of an open iron cage in the middle of the ocean.

== Lyrics and music ==
All lyrics were written by Farmer, who also composed the music for five songs. They contain many references to literary writers and painters. The album deals with Farmer's anxieties, such as pain, unhappy love, sexuality and the passage of the time. But as the title suggests, love is the central theme of the album.

The album is slower in comparison to Farmer's previous studio album, the rock-inspired Anamorphosée (1995). The sound is more electronic and intimate.

== Critical reception ==
In 2000, Innamoramento won a NRJ Music Awards in the category 'Francophone album of the year'.

== Commercial performance ==
In France, the album was released at a time when Francis Cabrel also made his comeback with his album Hors Saison, which topped the French Albums Chart. As a result, Innamoramento failed to reach #1 on the chart, but went straight in at #2 on 10 April 1999, remaining there for two weeks. Despite not hitting the top spot, the album remained in the chart for 94 weeks, including 18 weeks in the top ten and became one of Farmer's highest selling albums. It re-entered the chart during Farmer's Mylenium Tour and also when Universal organised further promotion of the album. Certified Diamond disc by the SNEP, Innamoramento ranked #4, #43 and #92 on 1999, 2000 and 2001 End of Year Charts respectively.

In Belgium (Wallonia), after entering at #5 on 17 April 1999, the album climbed to #2 during the following week and stayed there for five consecutive weeks. As in France, Francis Cabrel's album prevented Innamoramento from reaching the top of the chart. The album remained for 27 weeks in the top ten and 66 weeks in the Top 50. It featured at #5 and #58 on the 1999 and 2000 End of Year Charts.

Innamoramento also appeared for two weeks on the Belgium (Flanders) Albums Chart, on which it peaked at # 40.

== Track listing ==
All lyrics are written by Mylène Farmer except where noted; all music is composed by Laurent Boutonnat except where noted.

No.	Title	Music	Live performances	Length
1.	"L'amour naissant"		Mylènium Tour	4:59
2.	"L'Âme-stram-gram"		Mylènium Tour; 2009 tour Live 2019; Les années tube (TF1); Hit Machine (M6); Tapis rouge (France 2)	4:19
3.	"Pas le temps de vivre"	Farmer	Mylènium Tour; NRJ Music Awards	5:12
4.	"Dessine-moi un mouton"		Mylènium Tour	4:34
5.	"Je te rends ton amour"		Mylènium Tour; Tour 2009; Live 2019; La fureur du parc (TF1); 50 ans de tubes (TF1)	5:09
6.	"Méfie-toi"	Farmer	Mylènium Tour	5:25
7.	"Innamoramento"		Mylènium Tour; Live 2019	5:20
8.	"Optimistique-moi"	Farmer	Mylènium Tour; Nevermore 2023/2024; Hit Machine (M6); Les années tube (TF1); NRJ Music Awards	3:40
9.	"Serais-tu là ?"	Farmer		4:40
10.	"Consentement"			4:35
11.	"Et si vieillir m'était conté"	Farmer		4:50
12.	"Souviens-toi du jour"		Mylènium Tour; Tapis rouge (France 2); 100% Johnny (TF1)	4:55
13.	"Mylènium"		Mylènium Tour	5:20

== Personnel ==
- Angeline Annonier – choeurs
- Fred Attal – arranger, clavier, producer, programming, sauf
- Pascaud Caroline Blandin – background vocals
- Bertrand Chatnet – engineer, mixing
- Jeff Dahlgren – guitar
- Pol Ramirez del Piu – bagpipes, cymbalom, flute
- Jerome Devoise – assistant
- Mylène Farmer – vocals
- Johanna Ferdinand – choeurs, background vocals
- Denny Fongheiser – drums
- Joelle Jaque-Gustave – choeurs
- Abe Laboriel Jr. – drums
- Abraham Laboriel Sr. – bass
- Sophia Nelson – choeurs, background vocals
- Rik Pekkonen – engineer
- Colonna Phillippe – engineer
- Marie-Jo Plezel – choeurs
- Mathieu Rabaté – drums
- Carole Rowley – background vocals
- Rafa Sardina – assistant
- Mike Scotella – assistant
- Billy Sheehan – bass
- Frank Simes – guitar
- John Sorenson – assistant
- Chris Spedding – guitar
- Jerry Watts Jr. – bass

== Charts ==
=== Weekly charts ===
Initial weekly chart performance for Innamoramento
Chart (1999–2001)	Peak position
Belgian Albums (Ultratop Flanders)	40
Belgian Albums (Ultratop Wallonia)	2
European Albums (Music & Media)	30
French Albums (SNEP)	2

2013 weekly chart performance for Innamoramento
Chart (2013)	Peak position
French Albums (SNEP)	101

2021–2022 weekly chart performance for Innamoramento
Chart (2021–2022)	Peak position
Belgian Albums (Ultratop Wallonia)	15
Swiss Albums (Schweizer Hitparade)	59

=== Year-end charts ===
1999 year-end chart performance for Anamorphosée
Chart (1999)	Position
Belgian Albums (Ultratop Wallonia)	5
Belgian Francophone Albums (Ultratop Wallonia)	4
European Albums (Music & Media)	91
French Albums (SNEP)	4

2000 year-end chart performance for Anamorphosée
Chart (2000)	Position
Belgian Albums (Ultratop Wallonia)	58
Belgian Francophone Albums (Ultratop Wallonia)	24
French Albums (SNEP)	43

2001 year-end chart performance for Anamorphosée
Chart (2001)	Position
French Albums (SNEP)	92

== Certifications and sales ==
Region	Certification	Certified units/sales
Belgium (BRMA)	Platinum	50,000^{*}
France (SNEP)	Diamond	1,100,000
Switzerland (IFPI Switzerland)	Platinum	50,000^{^}
Summaries
Europe (IFPI)	Platinum	1,000,000^{*}
Worldwide	—	1,500,000
^{*} Sales figures based on certification alone.^{^} Shipments figures based on certification alone.

== Formats ==
- CD - Jewel case
- CD - Cardboard gatefold sleeve - Limited edition (300,000)
- Collector edition box - Numbered travel log version (including a CD and a booklet of travel with unpublished photos)
- Cassette
- Double 12"
- CD - Japan
- CD - Digipak (since 2005)
