= Anamorphosée =

Studio album by Mylène Farmer
- Released: 17 October 1995
- Recorded: Los Angeles, California
- Genres: Pop, rock
- Length: 57:47
- Label: Polydor
- Producer: Laurent Boutonnat

Mylène Farmer chronology
Dance Remixes (1992)	Anamorphosée (1995)	Live à Bercy (1997)

Singles from Anamorphosée
- 1. "XXL" Released: 19 September 1995; 2. "L'Instant X" Released: 12 December 1995; 3. "California" Released: 26 March 1996; 4. "Comme j'ai mal" Released: 1 June 1996; 5. "Rêver" Released: 16 November 1996

Anamorphosée is the fourth studio album by Mylène Farmer, released on 17 October 1995. Led by the number-one single "XXL", the album was something of a departure from her previous work. Although it received mixed reviews from critics, the album was very successful, peaking at no.1 and staying on the French album chart for almost two years.

== Background and writing ==
The movie Giorgino, produced by Laurent Boutonnat and in which Mylène Farmer starred, was both a critical and financial failure. Released on 5 October 1994, it was seen by barely 25,000 spectators in the first week and was the first setback in Farmer's career. As a result, the musical duo separated on bad terms, Boutonnat making Farmer responsible for this failure. The singer decided to go to Los Angeles, California, where she fell into anonymity and changed hairstyle (she became blond with long hair). There she composed a new album, drawing inspiration from a Sogyal Rinpoche's book, Le Livre tibétain de la Vie et de la Mort. The singer's perception of life changed through her travels, and she confided in an interview that she was no longer afraid of death; so, she was more optimistic. Finally, she called Boutonnat who joined her in Los Angeles for the recording.

Jeff Dahlgren, who performed the role of Giorgio Volli in Giorgino, had a great influence in the early composition of this album and was part of the musical team involved in preparing it. Boutonnat later came and the three finished the project. The album was recorded in the A&M studios and Record One in Los Angeles, and Boutonnat, who oversaw the production, chose the best American musicians at the time. Bertrand Châtenet, who had previously worked with Vanessa Paradis, was selected to mix the album.

== Lyrics and music ==
The album's title, "Anamorphosée" is a neologism in French-language (the noun exists, but not the past participle of the anamorphoser (denominative verb from anamorphose + -er infinitive suffix)). The Hachette dictionary defines "anamorphose" as an "image of an object, distorted by certain optical devices (cylindrical mirrors, for example)." That word thus refers to the new music style of the singer.

This album represents a departure from her previous work, in that the music is much more rock oriented. Five of the twelve tracks are ballads with melancholy text punctuated by American R&B-inspired arrangements. The lyrics are easier to understand and less cryptic than her previous albums. Although some themes dear to the artist are addressed in Anamorphosée, sadness and pain are much less present in this album which is more about the spirituality (Buddhism).

For the first time, Farmer wrote a song completely by herself, "Tomber 7 fois..."

== Critical reception ==
Professional ratings
Review scores
Source	Rating
AllMusic	3/5 stars

The album was sometimes well received in media that have mainly noted the change in musical style. For example: "Farmer has moved away from the images that she stuck to the skin just to keep a sensuality remained intact" (Dernières Nouvelles d'Alsace). The singer "has abandoned her eternal pessimism: the Mylène of 2000 is arrived, turned towards humanity with a big H and spirituality, via Lao Tzeu" (Double Face). "It is a shift announced by the new disc" (La Dernière Heure). With this album, "Farmer excels but against the current". "The tonic music have a hope in its infancy, words less drawn by the taste of nothing" (Télérama). "Anamorphosée has filled all hopes" (Vamp Canada). "The production is, as always, impeccable" (Platine).

However, some musical critics were very virulent to this album. For example, Le Monde stated that "the diversion of melodies from the band Nirvana makes hesitate between indignation and open laughs", while L'Evènement du jeudi concluded its article saying it should better "to avoid" this album.

A Victoire de la Musique was awarded to this album, which was regarded as the French album the most exported in 1996.

== Commercial performance ==
The album went straight to #2 on French Album Chart on 15 October 1995, behind Céline Dion's D'eux. It stayed at this place on the following chart edition, before dropping. However, it re-reached the #2 in its 13th week and for four other non-consecutive weeks. Surprisingly, the album became number one for two weeks on 18 and 25 January 1997, about one year and a half after its release. It remained on the Top ten for 34 weeks and on the chart (Top 50) for a total of 77 weeks. The album was also charted for four weeks on the Top Mid'Price, from 20 March to 10 April 2005, because it was re-released in a digipack version by Polydor. The album was certified Double platinum disc by the SNEP in 1996, then diamond in 2009.

In Belgium Wallonia, the album was charted for 71 weeks, from 4 November 1995 to 12 April 1997. It peaked at number two in its three first weeks, but was unable to reach number one (the chart was topped then by Céline Dion's D'eux); it appeared for 25 weeks in the top ten.

In Switzerland, the album entered the chart at #25, its highest position, on 12 November 1995, before dropping. It left the chart after its sixth week.

== Track listing ==
All lyrics are written by Mylène Farmer except where noted; all music is composed by Laurent Boutonnat except where noted.

Anamorphosée
No.	Title	Music	Live performances	Length
1.	"California"		Tour 1996; Mylenium Tour; Avant que l'ombre... à Bercy; Tour 2009; Live 2019	4:59
2.	"Vertige"		Tour 1996	5:29
3.	"Mylène s'en fout"		Tour 1996	4:31
4.	"L'Instant X"		Tour 1996; Tour 2009	4:46
5.	"Eaunanisme"			5:08
6.	"Et Tournoie..."		Tour 1996	4:29
7.	"XXL"		Tour 1996; Avant que l'ombre... à Bercy; Tour 2009; Timeless 2013; Nevermore 2023/2024	4:26
8.	"Rêver"		Tour 1996; Mylenium Tour; Avant que l'ombre... à Bercy; Tour 2009; Timeless 2013; Live 2019; Nevermore 2023/2024	5:22
9.	"Alice"		Tour 1996	5:21
10.	"Comme j'ai mal"		Tour 1996; Timeless 2013	3:53
11.	"Tomber 7 fois..."	Farmer	Tour 1996	4:50
12.	"Laisse le vent emporter tout"		Tour 1996; Tour 2009	4:00
Total length:				57:47

== Personnel ==
- Fred Attal – programming
- Laurent Boutonnat – arranger, clavier, keyboards, producer
- Bertrand Châtenet – mixing
- Jeff Dahlgren – guitar
- Pol Ramirez del Piu – flute
- Mylène Farmer – vocals
- Denny Fongheiser – drums
- Bernie Grundman – mastering
- Abraham Laboriel, Sr. – bass
- Kate Markowitz – background vocals
- Chad Munsey – engineer, sound recording
- Henry Neu – design
- André Perriat – mastering
- Herb Ritts – photography
- Thierry Rogen – engineer, mixing, sound recording
- Larry Schalit – assistant, mixing
- Mike Scotella – assistant, mixing
- Paul Van Parys – executive producer
- Ken Villeneuve – assistant, mixing
- Shelly Yakus – engineer, sound recording

== Charts ==
=== Weekly charts ===
Initial weekly chart performance for Anamorphosée
Chart (1995–1997)	Peak position
Belgian Albums (Ultratop Wallonia)	2
European Albums (Music & Media)	19
French Albums (SNEP)	1
Swiss Albums (Schweizer Hitparade)	25

2013 weekly chart performance for Anamorphosée
Chart (2013)	Peak position
French Albums (SNEP)	51

2022 weekly chart performance for Anamorphosée
Chart (2022)	Peak position
Belgian Albums (Ultratop Wallonia)	26
French Albums (SNEP)	58
Swiss Albums (Gfk Romandy)	43

=== Year-end charts ===
1995 year-end chart performance for Anamorphosée
Chart (1995)	Position
Belgian Albums (Ultratop Wallonia)	35
Belgian Francophone Albums (Ultratop Wallonia)	13
French Albums (SNEP)	18

1996 year-end chart performance for Anamorphosée
Chart (1996)	Position
French Albums (SNEP)	6

1997 year-end chart performance for Anamorphosée
Chart (1997)	Position
Belgian Albums (Ultratop Wallonia)	80

== Certifications and sales ==
Region	Certification	Certified units/sales
Belgium (BRMA)	Platinum	50,000^{*}
France (SNEP)	Diamond	1,100,000
Switzerland (IFPI Switzerland)	Gold	25,000^{^}
Summaries
Europe (IFPI)	Platinum	1,000,000^{*}
^{*} Sales figures based on certification alone.^{^} Shipments figures based on certification alone.

== Formats ==
- CD – Crystal case
- CD – Digipack
- Casket – Format : 12" – Numbered – Limited edition (5,000)
- Promotional casket – Format : 12"
- 12"
- Cassette
- CD – Japan^{1}
- CD – Taïwan

^{1} + "Alice" (new mix), "XXL" (extra large remix)
