= Live à Bercy =

Live album by Mylène Farmer
- Released: 21 May 1997 (album, VHS); May 1999 (DVD); January 2020 (LP)
- Recorded: Paris
- Genre: Rock, pop
- Length: 118:13
- Label: Polydor
- Producer: Laurent Boutonnat

Mylène Farmer chronology
Anamorphosée (1995)	Live à Bercy (1997)	Innamoramento (1999)

Alternative cover
- Collector edition - "Spider"

Singles from Live à Bercy
- 1. "La Poupée qui fait non" Released: 29 April 1997; 2. "Ainsi soit je..." Released: 20 August 1997

Live à Bercy is the second live album by Mylène Farmer, released on 21 May 1997. It was also produced as a video.

== Background ==
After the successful concerts tour of 1996, whose shows were spread out from 25 May to 15 December, a live album was recorded and produced by Thierry Suc, and sponsored by NRJ. It was remixed in studio to give it a better sound. The re-orchestrations, composed by Laurent Boutonnat, were very dynamic with very rock sonorities. The photos illustrating the booklet were realized by Claude Gassian. The track listing contains songs from the four studio albums of Farmer, but Anamorphosée was sharply privileged, because all its songs were included on the album, except "Eaunanisme". This live album was released on 21 May 1997.

In May, a musical video of the concert was also realized, first as a VHS. For the first time, François Hans participated in the shooting of a live. As for the previous live album En concert, several scenes were re-filmed without the audience. The live video contains nevertheless numerous errors of editing, because it was compiled from four shows: three at Bercy and another in Geneva. It contains besides a making of and new images.

Two years later, in May 1999, the video was released as a DVD, which constituted moreover the first DVD of the singer. However, it doesn't contain the bonuses available on the cassette. The DVD was dedicated to the singer's brother, Jean-Loup Gautier, died on 26 October 1996 after a road accident.

== Critical reception ==
Professional ratings
Review scores
Source	Rating
AllMusic	3/5 stars

Generally well received by media, the album was nevertheless criticized for having been too much remixed in studio. For example, the journalist Caroline Bee declared: "Everything is emphasized: Mylène's voice, the shouts of the public, Abraham Laboriel's powerful drum, the bass and both guitars, impeccable. All that gives a perfect whole, without dissonance, but which sounds more as an album studio than as a real transcription of concert".

== Commercial performance ==
In France, the album debuted at number 3 on French Album Chart, on 24 May 1997. It then reached its peak position, #2, for two consecutive weeks, and for two other weeks two months later. Andrea Bocelli's Romanza, then Era's eponymous album made it unable to reach number one. It remained for 18 weeks in the top ten, and dropped until #36 on 8 November, but managed to re-entered the top 20 the week after and there stayed for nine weeks. It almost kept on dropping the months after and left the chart (Top 75) after its 44th week of attendance, on 28 March 1998. Three days before, the album achieved Double platinum status by the SNEP, the French certifier, for a minimum of 600,000 copies sold.

The video, both the VHS and the DVD, reached the first position on the French Videos Chart. They were both certified Diamond videos on 24 October 2001, for more than 100,000 sold copies.

In Belgium Wallonia, the album went straight to number 4 on 7 June 1997 and then peaked at #2 for 12 consecutive weeks (Era topped the chart then). After 18 weeks in the top ten, the album slowly dropped the four following months and disappeared from the chart (Top 50) on 31 March 1998, after 35 weeks of attendance.

== Track listing ==
=== French version ===
All lyrics are written by Mylène Farmer except where noted; all music is composed by Laurent Boutonnat except where noted.

Disc one
No.	Title	Lyrics	Music	Original album	Length
1.	"Ouverture"			-	4:41
2.	"Vertige"			Anamorphosée	6:24
3.	"California"			Anamorphosée	7:12
4.	"Que Mon Cœur Lâche"			-	4:42
5.	"Et Tournoie...ˣ"			Anamorphosée	4:30
6.	"Je T'aime Mélancolie"			L'autre...	5:14
7.	"L'autre..."			L'autre...	5:46
8.	"Libertine"	Boutonnat	Jean-Claude Dequéant	Cendres de lune	5:34
9.	"L'instant X"			Anamorphosée	9:41
10.	"Alice"			Anamorphosée	5:28

Disc two
No.	Title	Lyrics	Music	Original album	Length
1.	"Comme J'ai Mal"			Anamorphosée	4:41
2.	"Sans contrefaçon"			Ainsi soit je...	4:22
3.	"Mylène s'en Fout"			Anamorphosée	5:37
4.	"Désenchantée"			L'autre...	7:26
5.	"Rêver"			Anamorphosée	8:26
6.	"Laisse le vent emporter tout"			Anamorphosée	6:29
7.	"Tomber 7 Fois...ˣ"		Farmer	Anamorphosée	5:05
8.	"Ainsi soit je..."			Ainsi soit je...	4:39
9.	"La Poupée Qui Fait Non (duet with Khaled)"	Franck Gérald	Michel Polnareff	-	4:39
10.	"XXL"			Anamorphosée	7:26

ˣ Not included in the cassette release.

=== VHS/DVD ===
Act I

1. "Ouverture" (4:45)
2. "Vertige" (6:20)
3. "California" (7:30)
4. "Que mon cœur lâche" (4:35)
5. "Et Tournoie..." (4:30)

Act II

6. "Je t'aime mélancolie" (5:20)
7. "L'Autre..." (5:50)

Act III

8. "Libertine" (5:40)
9. "L'Instant X" (9:36)

Act IV

10. "Alice" (5:25)
11. "Comme j'ai mal" (4:35)

Act V

12. "Sans contrefaçon" (4:20)
13. "Mylène s'en fout" (4:45)
14. "Désenchantée" (8:15)

Act VI

15. "Rêver" (8:00)
16. "Laisse le vent emporter tout" (6:25)
17. "Tomber 7 fois..." (6:00)
18. "Ainsi soit je..." (5:00)
19. "La Poupée qui fait non" (duet with Khaled) (4:30)

Encore

20. "XXL" (7:00)

== Personnel ==
- Laurent Boutonnat – arranger, producer
- AJ Ocampo - dancer
- Jermaine Brown – dancer
- Yvan Cassar – arranger, clavier, director, keyboards, musical director
- Bertrand Chatnet – mixing
- Jeff Dahlgren – guitar
- Christophe Danchaud – dancer
- Mylène Farmer – concept, primary artist, vocals
- Emmanuel Feyrabend – mixing, mixing assistant
- Claude Gassian – photography
- Khaled – performer
- Abe Laboriel Jr. - drums
- Henry Neu – design
- André Perriat – mastering
- Philippe Rault – consultant, producer
- Brian Ray – guitar
- Thierry Rogen – engineer
- Carole Rowley – choir/chorus
- Brian Thomas – dancer
- Paul Van Parys – executive producer
- Jerry Watts Jr. - bass
- Donna DeLory - Dancer/back vocalist

== Charts ==
=== Weekly album charts ===
Initial weekly chart performance for Live à Bercy
Chart (1997–1998)	Peak position
Belgian Albums (Ultratop Wallonia)	2
European Albums (Music & Media)	17
French Albums (SNEP)	2

2020 weekly chart performance for Live à Bercy
Chart (2020)	Peak position
Belgian Albums (Ultratop Wallonia)	46

=== Weekly DVD charts ===
Chart (2010)	Peak position
French Music DVD (SNEP)	5
Swiss Music DVD (Schweizer Hitparade)	7

=== Year-end album charts ===
1997 year-end chart performance for Live à Bercy
Chart (1997)	Position
Belgian Albums (Ultratop Wallonia)	13
European Albums (Music & Media)	81
French Albums (SNEP)	11

=== Year-end DVD charts ===
Chart (2006)	Position
French DVDs (SNEP)	52
Chart (2007)	Position
French DVDs (SNEP)	99
Chart (2009)	Position
French DVDs (SNEP)	57
Chart (2010)	Position
French DVDs (SNEP)	56

== Certifications and sales ==
Region	Certification	Certified units/sales
Album
Belgium (BRMA)	Gold	25,000^{*}
France (SNEP)	2× Platinum	600,000^{*}
Switzerland (IFPI Switzerland)	Gold	25,000^{^}
Summaries
Worldwide	—	900,000
VHS
France (SNEP)	Diamond	100,000^{*}
DVD
France (SNEP)	Diamond	100,000^{*}
^{*} Sales figures based on certification alone.^{^} Shipments figures based on certification alone.

== Formats ==
Audio

- Double CD
- Double CD – Promo - "Spider" (2 CD + VHS)
- Cassette (Doesn't contain "Et Tournoie..." and "Tomber 7 fois...")

Video

- VHS
  - Plastic case with hologram logos
  - Plastic case with silvery logos
- 12" Laserdisc
- DVD
  - Plastic case with hologram logos
  - Plastic case with silvery logos
