= Plus grandir (album) =

Compilation album by Mylène Farmer
- Released: 20 August 2021
- Recorded: 1985–1997
- Genre: Pop
- Label: Polydor

Mylène Farmer chronology
Histoires de (2020)	Plus grandir (2021)	L'Emprise (2022)

Plus grandir is the fourth compilation album by French singer Mylène Farmer, released on 20 August 2021 on the Polydor Records. The album debuted on the first place in the French Albums Chart.

== Track listing ==
All lyrics are written by Mylène Farmer except where noted; all music is composed by Laurent Boutonnat except where noted.

Disc one
No.	Title	Lyrics	Music	Original album	Length
1.	"Plus grandir"			Cendres de lune	4:05
2.	"Libertine" (Single Version)	Laurent Boutonnat	Jean-Claude Dequéant	Cendres de lune	3:30
3.	"Tristana"			Cendres de lune	4:40
4.	"Sans contrefaçon" (Single Version)			Ainsi soit je...	3:52
5.	"Ainsi soit je..."			Ainsi soit je...	4:32
6.	"Pourvu qu'elles soient douces" (single version)			Ainsi soit je...	4:12
7.	"Allan" (Live edit 1989)			Ainsi soit je...	5:13
8.	"À quoi je sers..."			-	4:36
9.	"Sans logique" (Logical single mix)			Ainsi soit je...	4:05
10.	"Plus grandir" (Live mix 1989)			En concert	4:10
11.	"Regrets" (duet with Jean-Louis Murat)			L'autre...	4:45
Total length:					47:43

Disc two
No.	Title	Lyrics	Music	Original album	Length
1.	"Je t'aime mélancolie" (new radio remix)			L'autre...	4:23
2.	"Désenchantée" (Single Version)			L'autre...	4:48
3.	"Que mon cœur lâche"			-	4:08
4.	"Beyond My Control" (single mix)			L'autre...	4:51
5.	"My Soul Is Slashed"			-	4:17
6.	"XXL"			Anamorphosée	4:25
7.	"L'Instant X" (radio edit)			Anamorphosée	4:15
8.	"Comme j'ai mal"			Anamorphosée	3:56
9.	"Rêver" (radio edit)			Anamorphosée	4:54
10.	"California" (radio edit)			Anamorphosée	4:15
11.	"La Poupée qui fait non" (duet with Khaled, Live 1996)	Franck Gérald	Michel Polnareff	Live à Bercy	4:24
12.	"Ainsi soit je..." (Live 1996)			Live à Bercy	4:41
Total length:					53:17

== Charts ==
=== Weekly charts ===
Weekly chart performance for Plus grandir
Chart (2021)	Peak position
Belgian Albums (Ultratop Flanders)	153
Belgian Albums (Ultratop Wallonia)	1
French Albums (SNEP)	1
Greek Albums (IFPI Greece)	11
Swiss Albums (Schweizer Hitparade)	69
Swiss Albums (Schweizer Hitparade Romandy)	6

=== Year-end charts ===
Year-end chart performance for Plus grandir
Chart (2021)	Position
Belgian Albums (Ultratop Wallonia)	91
French Albums (SNEP)	142

== Certifications ==
Certifications for Plus grandir
Region	Certification	Certified units/sales
France (SNEP)	Platinum	100,000^{‡}
^{‡} Sales+streaming figures based on certification alone.
