= Les Clips =

Video by Mylène Farmer
- Released: November 1987
- Recorded: 1984–1987
- Genre: Compilation
- Length: about 35:00
- Label: Polydor

Mylène Farmer chronology
| Les Clips (1987) | Les Clips Vol. II (1988) |

Les Clips is a VHS recorded by the French singer Mylène Farmer, containing all the singer's videoclips from 1984 to 1987. It was released in November 1987 in France.

This VHS contains all the video of the singles from the album Cendres de Lune, with the original version of "Tristana". This is the first VHS including the videoclips of an artist in France.

This VHS content is also included on the DVD Music Videos I.

The magazine Top 50 said this VHS is a "great idea" and contains "four beautiful videoclips". As for the French newspaper Le Provençal, it gave a positive analysis of the contents of this VHS.

== Formats ==
This video is available only on VHS.

== Track listings ==
| No | Video | From Album | Year | Length |
|---|---|---|---|---|
| 1 | "Maman a tort" | Cendres de Lune | 1984 | 3:50 |
| 2 | "Plus grandir" | Cendres de Lune | 1985 | 7:32 |
| 3 | "Libertine" | Cendres de Lune | 1986 | 10:53 |
| 4 | "Tristana" | Cendres de Lune | 1987 | 11:33 |

== Credits and personnel ==
All these videos were directed by Laurent Boutonnat.

Produced by:

- "Maman a tort", "Plus grandir": Stephane Sperry
- "Libertine", "Tristana": Alain Grandgérard / Movie-Box

== Certifications and sales ==
| Country | Certification | Sales/shipments |
|---|---|---|
| France | Platinum | 50,000+ |
