= Dance Remixes =

- French cover. For international artworks, the background is colored white instead of black.

Remix album by Mylène Farmer
- Released: 23 November 1992
- Genre: Pop, dance-pop, electronic
- Length: 1:50:00
- Label: Polydor
- Producer: Laurent Boutonnat

Mylène Farmer chronology
L'autre... (1991)	Dance Remixes (1992)	Anamorphosée (1995)

Singles from Remixes
- 1. "Que mon cœur lâche" Released: 23 November 1992; 2. "My Soul Is Slashed" Released: May 1993

Professional ratings
Review scores
Source	Rating
AllMusic	2.5/5 stars
Fnac	9/10 stars

Dance Remixes is the first remix album by Mylène Farmer, released on 23 November 1992.

== Release, writing and release ==
Rather than a simple compilation, the French version of the album contains two CDs with remixes of fifteen songs. These remixes, all made by Laurent Boutonnat and Thierry Rogen (for the latter, it was his last collaboration), had mostly been previously released as B-sides of Mylène Farmer's vinyl singles, except "We'll Never Die" (Techno Remix) and "Libertine" (Carnal Sins Remix), made for the occasion, as the "Extended Dance Remix" of the new song "Que mon cœur lâche". This song, whose video was directed by Luc Besson, was the only single released to promote the album, and the last vinyl from the singer.

"We'll Never Die" is the only song available on this album that was never released as a single.

An international version of the album was also released. It contains only ten remixes, including the remix of "My Soul Is Slashed", the English version of "Que mon cœur lâche". Apart from the number of titles, the two covers also are distinguished by the color of the cover (black for the French version, white for the International).

The booklet's pictures, made by Marianne Rosenstiehl, show Mylène Farmer training in a gym.

There were two singles from this album: "Que mon cœur lâche", and its English-language version "My Soul Is Slashed" (only available on the European CD album).

The album peaked at #3 on the French Compilations Chart on 9 December 1992. It was re-issued in 2005 in a digipack version and was therefore charted on the Albums Charts, reaching #108 on 9 April 2005 and stayed in the top 200 for four weeks.

== Track listing ==
=== French version ===
Disc one
No.	Title	Lyrics	Music	Original album	Length
1.	"We'll Never Die" (techno remix)	Laurent Boutonnat	Laurent Boutonnat	Cendres de lune	7:30
2.	"Sans contrefaçon" (boy remix)	Mylène Farmer	Boutonnat	Ainsi soit je...	5:55
3.	"Tristana" (club remix)	Farmer	Boutonnat	Cendres de lune	7:11
4.	"Sans logique" (illogical club remix)	Farmer	Boutonnat	Ainsi soit je...	7:57
5.	"Allan" (extended mix)	Farmer	Boutonnat	Ainsi soit je...	7:10
6.	"Ainsi soit-je..." (maxi remix)	Farmer	Boutonnat	Ainsi soit je...	6:25
7.	"Plus grandir" (mother's live remix)	Farmer	Boutonnat	Cendres de lune	7:50
8.	"À quoi je sers..." (club remix)	Farmer	Boutonnat	-	7:50

Disc two
No.	Title	Lyrics	Music	Original album	Length
1.	"Que mon cœur lâche" (extended dance remix)	Mylène Farmer	Laurent Boutonnat	-	8:10
2.	"Pourvu qu'elles soient douces" (club remix)	Farmer	Boutonnat	Ainsi soit je...	6:30
3.	"Libertine" (carnal sins remix)	Boutonnat	Jean-Claude Dequéant	Cendres de lune	7:00
4.	"Je t'aime mélancolie" (extended club remix)	Farmer	Boutonnat	L'autre...	7:45
5.	"Regrets" (extended club remix)	Farmer	Boutonnat	L'autre...	7:13
6.	"Beyond My Control" (godforsaken mix)	Farmer	Boutonnat	L'autre...	8:03
7.	"Désenchantée" (club remix)	Farmer	Boutonnat	L'autre...	8:10

=== International version ===
Disc one
No.	Title	Lyrics	Music	Original album	Length
1.	"My Soul Is Slashed" (the rubber mix)	Mylène Farmer	Laurent Boutonnat	-	7:31
2.	"Sans contrefaçon" (boy remix)	Farmer	Boutonnat	Ainsi soit je...	5:55
3.	"Je t'aime mélancolie" (extended club remix)	Farmer	Boutonnat	L'autre...	7:45
4.	"Allan" (extended mix)	Farmer	Boutonnat	Ainsi soit je...	7:10
5.	"Ainsi soit-je..." (maxi remix)	Farmer	Boutonnat	Ainsi soit je...	6:25
6.	"We'll Never Die" (techno remix)	Boutonnat	Boutonnat	Cendres de lune	7:30
7.	"Sans logique" (illogical club remix)	Farmer	Boutonnat	Ainsi soit je...	7:57
8.	"Pourvu qu'elles soient douces" (club remix)	Farmer	Boutonnat	Ainsi soit je...	6:30
9.	"Beyond My Control" (godforsaken mix)	Farmer	Boutonnat	L'autre...	8:03
10.	"Désenchantée" (club remix)	Farmer	Boutonnat	L'autre...	8:10

=== Cassette ===
A-side
No.	Title	Lyrics	Music	Original album	Length
1.	"We'll Never Die" (techno remix)	Laurent Boutonnat	Laurent Boutonnat	Cendres de lune	7:30
2.	"Sans contrefaçon" (boy remix)	Mylène Farmer	Boutonnat	Ainsi soit je...	5:55
3.	"Tristana" (club remix)	Farmer	Boutonnat	Cendres de lune	7:11
4.	"Sans logique" (illogical club remix)	Farmer	Boutonnat	Ainsi soit je...	7:57
5.	"Allan" (extended mix)	Farmer	Boutonnat	Ainsi soit je...	7:10
6.	"À quoi je sers..." (club remix)	Farmer	Boutonnat	-	7:50

B-side
No.	Title	Lyrics	Music	Original album	Length
1.	"Que mon cœur lâche" (extended dance remix)	Mylène Farmer	Laurent Boutonnat	-	8:10
2.	"Pourvu qu'elles soient douces" (club remix)	Farmer	Boutonnat	Ainsi soit je...	6:30
3.	"Libertine" (carnal sins remix)	Boutonnat	Jean-Claude Dequéant	Cendres de lune	7:00
4.	"Je t'aime mélancolie" (extended club remix)	Farmer	Boutonnat	L'autre...	7:45
5.	"Beyond My Control" (godforsaken mix)	Farmer	Boutonnat	L'autre...	8:03
6.	"Désenchantée" (club remix)	Farmer	Boutonnat	L'autre...	8:10

== Versions ==
Version	Length	Also available on	Year	Comment
"À quoi je sers..." (club remix)	7:50	CD maxi, 7" maxi	1989	There are more musical bridges. At the end, a male voice saying "Quoi" can be heard.
"Ainsi soit je..." (maxi remix)	7:10	CD maxi, 7" maxi	1988	This version is so slow and melancholy as the original one, with more music and refrains. There are also more percussion that punctuated the title throughout the song. Farmer sings "soit je" several times at the beginning of this remix.
"Allan" (extended mix)	7:57	CD maxi, 7" maxi	1990	Devoted to discothèques, this version includes a new orchestration with a fast tempo. There are more refrains.
"Beyond My Control" (godforsaken mix)	8:03	CD maxi, 12" maxi, CD single (Canada)	1992	In this version, the introduction (about 2:00) is composed of guitar riffs, John Malkovich's voice, the word "Lâche" repeated by Farmer and a cry of a man.
"Désenchantée" (remix club)	8:10	CD maxi, cassette, 7" maxi (Germany, Canada)	1991	The song begins with the sounds of children in a playground, and then with a musical introduction in which the words "génération", "désenchantée" and "tout est chaos" are sampled. The music is accelerated and the bridge is extended.
"Je t'aime mélancolie" (extended club remix)	7:45	CD maxi, 7" maxi	1991	The song is punctuated by the phrase "Je t'aime, je t'aime, je t'aime mélancolie", sung by Farmer.
"Libertine" (carnal sins remix)	7:00		1992	This version adds suggestive sighs and cries of Farmer.
"My Soul Is Slashed" (the rubber remix)	7:34	CD maxi, CD single (promo, France)	1992	This is a dance version with a musical introduction that lasts about two minutes.
"Plus grandir" (mother's live remix)	6:25	CD maxi, 7" maxi	1989	This remixed version, a disco duet with Carole Fredericks, was aired in many discothèques. The song starts with a dialogue between Fredericks and Farmer (as for the Live Mix, Fredericks' words are originally recorded for "Maman a tort"). English words, particularly the phrase "Who's my mother ?" that Farmer repeats throughout the song, have been added in this version.
"Pourvu qu'elles soient douces" (remix club)	6:30	CD maxi, 7" maxi	1988	This is a remixed version including many gimmicks and scratches in the musical bridge.
"Que mon cœur lâche" (extended dance remix)	8:10	7" maxi, CD maxi (Germany) of "My Soul Is Slashed"	1992	This is a dance remix devoted to the nightclubs.
"Regrets" (extended club remix)	7:13	CD maxi, 7" maxi	1991	This version contains a long introduction in which the two singers are answering each other with words not sung. Words are actually sampled in a phonetic reversal. All the lyrics from the original version are sung.
"Sans contrefaçon" (boy remix)	5:55	CD maxi, 7" maxi	1987	This dance remix had an introduction of 1:30.
"Sans logique" (illogical club remix)	7:11	CD maxi, 7" maxi	1989	In this dance remix, the phrase "This is a blank formatted disket" is mixed with a voice of a man.
"Tristana" (remix club)	7:10	7" maxi, cassette, Cendres de Lune	1987	This dance remix uses a lot of drum machines and many echoes.
"We'll Never Die" (techno remix)	7:30		1992	This remix has techno sonorities.

== Personnel ==
- Text: Mylène Farmer
  - Except: "Libertine": Laurent Boutonnat
- Music: Laurent Boutonnat
  - Except: "Libertine": Jean-Claude Dequéant
- Editions: Bertrand Le Page / Polygram Music
  - Except: "À quoi je sers...": Requiem Publishing / Bertrand Le Page; "Que mon cœur lâche", "Je t'aime mélancolie", "Regrets", "Beyond My Control", "Désenchantée": Requiem Publishing
- Record label: Polydor
- Production: Laurent Boutonnat
- Remixes produced by Laurent Boutonnat and Thierry Rogen
- Sound Engineer: Thierry Rogen (Studio Mega)
- Management: Thierry Suc
- Engraving: André Perriat (Top Master)
- Photography: Marianne Rosenstiehl (Sygma)
- Design: Com' N.B

== Charts ==
Chart (1992)	Peak position
French Compilations (SNEP)	3

== Certifications and sales ==
Region	Certification	Certified units/sales
France (SNEP)	2× Gold	200,000^{*}
^{*} Sales figures based on certification alone.

== Formats ==
- Double CD
- Double 12" - Limited edition (5,000)
- CD - Germany (1)
- CD - Japan (1)
- CD - Republic of China (1)
- Cassette (2)

(1) Only 10 remixes (2) Only 12 remixes
