= Music Videos II =

Music Video II

Video by Mylène Farmer
- Released: April 1997
- Recorded: 1992–1996
- Genre: Compilation
- Label: Polydor

Mylène Farmer chronology
Music Videos I (1997)	Music Video II (1997)	Live à Bercy (2000)

Music Videos II is a VHS recorded by the French singer Mylène Farmer, containing all the singer's videoclips from 1992 to 1996. It was released in April 1997 in France.

This VHS contains all the video of the singles from the album Anamorphosée, and that of "Que mon cœur lâche" (which didn't appear on any Farmer's album when it was released). For the first and the only time, the famous American movie screenwriter and director Abel Ferrara participated in the production of a Farmer's video, "California".

This video was a little less sold than the previous one, Music Videos I.

== Formats ==
This video is available only on VHS.

== Track listings ==
No	Video	From album	Year	Length
1	"Que mon cœur lâche"	Dance Remixes	1992	6:44
2	"XXL"	Anamorphosée	1995	4:34
3	"L'Instant X"	Anamorphosée	1995	4:22
4	"California"	Anamorphosée	1996	5:18
5	"Comme j'ai mal"	Anamorphosée	1996	4:00

+ Backstage of the videos "California" (26:52).

== Credits and personnel ==
- "Que mon cœur lâche": Produced by Luc Besson
- "XXL", "L'Instant X", "Comme j'ai mal": Produced by Marcus Nispel
- "California": Produced by Abel Ferrara
