= Les Clips Vol. II =

Video by Mylène Farmer
- Released: December 1988
- Recorded: 1987–1988
- Genre: Compilation
- Length: about 56:00
- Label: Polydor

Mylène Farmer chronology
Les Clips (1987)	Les Clips Vol. II (1988)	Les Clips Vol. III (1990)

Les Clips Vol. II is a VHS recorded by the French singer Mylène Farmer, containing all the singer's videoclips from 1988 to 1989. It was released in December 1988 in France.

This VHS contains all the three first videos of the singles from the album Ainsi soit je... For the first time, a special report had been created concerning the shooting of a music video. It is also the first but not the last time that François Hanss participating in the filming of a documentary in connection with Mylène Farmer.

This VHS content is also included on the DVD Music Videos I.

== Critical reception ==
According to Compact, this DVD offers "superb disturbing stories, beautiful images"; as for the documentary on the filming of "Pourvu qu'elles soient douces", it was described as being "subtly perverse". Folk and Rock praised this VHS describing these videos as "blockbusters surpassing one million franc", and underlining the "exceptional score" in terms of sales. The French newspaper Le Provençal also gave a positive analysis of the contents of this VHS. Intimité said this cassette offers "one hour of delight". The videos of this cassette have an "exceptional quality", according to L'Avenir.

On 7 and 8 August 1989, during the first edition of the Nights of the musical audiovisual, the VHS was awarded best French compilation of music videos.

== Formats ==
This video is available only on VHS.

== Track listings ==
No	Video	From Album	Year	Length
1	"Sans contrefaçon"	Ainsi soit je...	1987	8:43
2	"Ainsi soit-je..."	Ainsi soit je...	1988	5:23
3	"Pourvu qu'elles soient douces"	Ainsi soit je...	1989	17:52

+ Backstage of the video "Pourvu qu'elles soient douces" (23:17)

== Credits and personnel ==
All these videos were directed by Laurent Boutonnat and produced by Toutankhamon. The backstage were filmed by François Hanss.

== Certifications and sales ==
Country	Certification	Sales/shipments
France	2× Platinum	50,000+
