= Les Clips Vol. III =

Video by Mylène Farmer
- Released: March 1990
- Recorded: 1989–1990
- Genre: Compilation
- Label: Polydor

Mylène Farmer chronology
Les Clips Vol. II (1988)	Les Clips Vol. III (1990)	The Videos (1990)

Les Clips Vol. III is a VHS recorded by the French singer Mylène Farmer, containing all the singer's videoclips from 1989 to 1990. It was released in March 1990 in France.

In order to release a new video clips, Laurent Boutonnat decided to include the two live videos "Allan" and "Plus grandir", and had therefore deleted them from the video En Concert, which was scheduled to release a few weeks later. Despite its platinum certification, this VHS was the least-selling video, in comparison with the two previous VHS.

This VHS content is also included on the DVD Music Videos I.

== Formats ==
This video is available only on VHS.

== Track listings ==
No	Video	From album	Year	Length
1	"Sans logique"	Ainsi soit je...	1989	5:37
2	"À quoi je sers..."		1989	4:58
3	"Allan (live)"	En Concert	1990	5:42
4	"Plus grandir (live)"	En Concert	1990	4:50

== Credits and personnel ==
- Directed by Laurent Boutonnat
- Produced by Toutankhamon
- Editions : Polydor / Bertrand Le Page

Except : "À quoi je sers...": Requiem Publishing / Bertrand Le Page

== Certifications and sales ==
Country	Certification	Sales/shipments
France	Platinum	40,000+
