= Sans logique =

Single by Mylène Farmer

from the album Ainsi soit je...
- B-side: "Dernier Sourire"
- Released: 20 February 1989
- Recorded: 1989, France
- Genre: Synthpop, baroque pop
- Length: 4:00
- Label: Polydor
- Songwriters: Lyrics: Mylène Farmer; Music: Laurent Boutonnat
- Producer: Laurent Boutonnat

Mylène Farmer singles chronology
"Pourvu qu'elles soient douces" (1988)	"Sans logique" (1989)	"À quoi je sers..." (1989)

"Sans logique" (English: "Without Logic") is a 1988 song recorded by French singer-songwriter Mylène Farmer. It was released on 20 February 1989 as the fourth and last single from her second studio album Ainsi soit je.... The song deals with schizophrenia, death, love and religion and was accompanied by a cinematic video which shows a human corrida. The single became a top ten hit in France.

== Background and writing ==
After the successful songs "Sans contrefaçon" and "Pourvu qu'elles soient douces" and the huge sales of the parent album Ainsi soit je..., Farmer decided to release "Sans logique" as the fourth and last single from the album as she was preparing her first concert tour through France, Belgium and Switzerland. The B-side of the single, "Dernier Sourire", is a previously unavailable song about the death of a relative (though a live version of the cover "Je voudrais tant que tu comprennes", originally sung by Marie Laforêt, was first scheduled as the B-side).

"Sans logique" was actually recorded twice due to technical problems in the studio. The sentence "this is a blank formatted diskette" (sampled from an Ensoniq Mirage), which can be heard in the introduction of the song and later on, refers to this problem and was kept in the finished product. "Sans logique" was widely played on French radio during the year of its release was one of the top ten songs that yielded the most copyright royalties to the Société des auteurs, compositeurs et éditeurs de musique in 1989.

Shortly after the single's release, the European Workers Party used a still from the video, where Farmer has white eyes and the horns on her head, with the subtitle "These people promote ugliness and drugs! Say "No" to the media subculture; vote RFL!" Farmer sued the secretary of the party, Jacques Cheminade, accusing him of having used her image without her consent and have made inappropriate and abusive remarks towards her. The Tribunal de grande instance de Paris found in Farmer's favour.

== Lyrics and music ==
The song makes reference to religious concepts (angels and Satan) to explore the two opposite sides of one person. The calculating Marquise de Mertreuil (a character in the French epistolary novel Les Liaisons dangereuses), as both angelic as diabolical according to her own interests, seems to be evoked in the lyrics. The psychologist Hugues Royer said the lyrics, as well as the music video, show that "the identity, the sense of unity to achieve, remains problematic".

== Music video ==
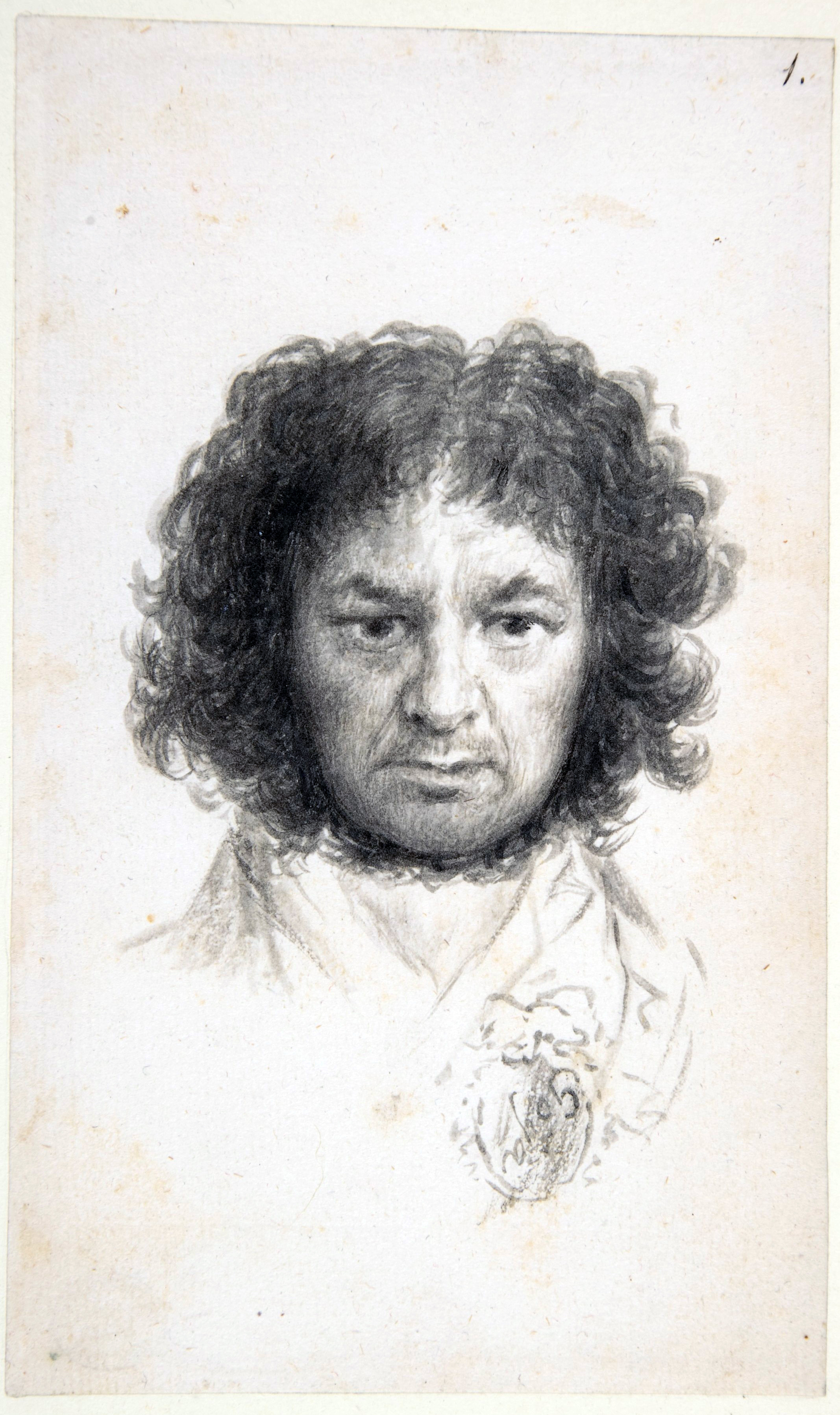
Spanish painter Francisco Goya inspired the music video for "Sans logique".

=== Production ===
The video (5:37) was directed by Laurent Boutonnat who has also written the screenplay with Gilles Laurent. It was a Requiem Publishing production, filmed over the course of three days at a studio in Arpajon in the Île-de-France région, France, where the video for "Que mon cœur lâche" was also shot three years later. It cost around 200,000 euros to make, largely due to Boutonnat importing two tons of earth and a large waxed cloth that was used to represent the sky. The video concept was inspired by Francisco Goya's painting El Aquelarre which portrays a human corrida, and features various people including a torero (played by Lilah Dadi who also appeared in the video for Farmer's next single, "À quoi je sers..."'). Due to its graphic, violent content, the video for "Sans logigue" was edited by some television channels for broadcast. The unedited version was released on Farmer's various video clips compilations.

=== Plot ===
The video begins with Farmer and her lover sat in the middle of a desolate, barren landscape on a grim cloudy day. As a snake slithers nearby, the pair cut their palms and rub their hands together to mix their blood. A little girl picks up a statue of Christ found in the mud and sticks it on a cross. Then several Gypsies, dressed in black clothes and veils, come to sit on a bench to watch a human bullfight. Farmer plays the "bull", as her hands are tied behind her back and iron horns are put on her head, and is thus forced to fight a torero who is her lover. The men take off their jackets and behave like toreros, and as Farmer runs through their coats like a raging bull, her lover puts a sword in her back. The man, believing the "bull" to be defeated, turns to his audience and celebrates his victory, and the gypsies cheer him and throw coins. Then, with her eyes rolled upwards and seemingly possessed by a demonic spirit, Farmer charges one last time and impales her lover with the iron horns on her head, fatally injuring him. While she becomes herself again, she attends to her dying lover, as it begins raining and the crowd of Gypsies disperse after their entertainment. The video ends with Farmer crying a tear of blood.

=== Influence, interpretation and reception ===
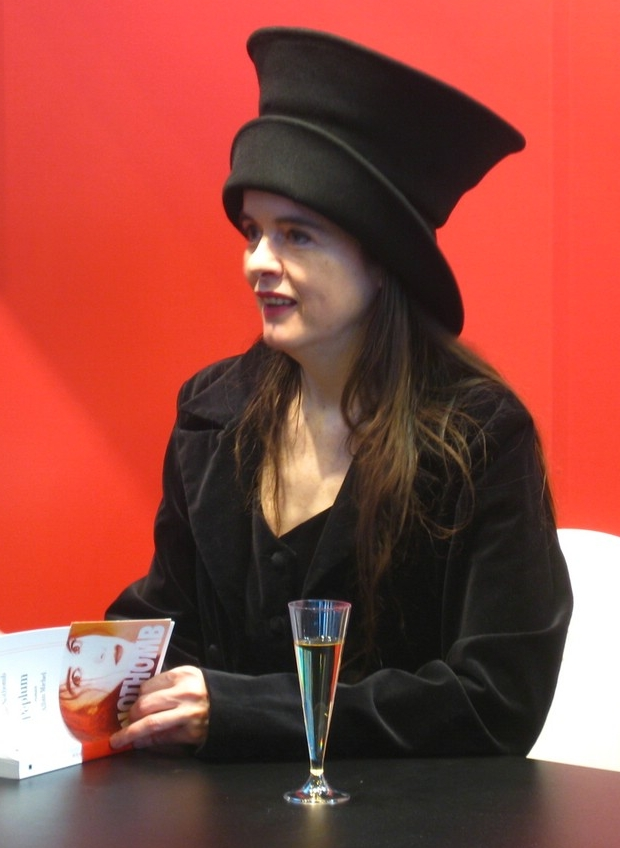
Belgian writer Amélie Nothomb clearly refers to the music video for "Sans logique" in her 1997 book Attentat.

According to Instant-Mag, "Sans Logique" is without a doubt "one of the most beautiful videos of the singer: percussive images, multiple references, many interpretation, rich symbolism". It condenses "the strong themes of the filmmaker Luis Buñuel", particularly the social struggle. Like Goya's painting, the video "tackles the fundamental perversion of men; reality is described as obsessive and mixes dreams and nightmares". It is "built as an ode to the Spanish forbidden culture, in which mix the themes of childhood and social corruption". "The old characters that form the audience [in the video] represent affluent people, the guarantors of moral order, the partners of moral conformism". According to French magazine Top 50, the video manages to "marry dead, mournful, tragedy with music for discothèques", "by dint of symbols, sophisticated decors and subtle union of beauty and unhealthy." Biographer Bernard Violet said this video is "by far the most inventive" ever made by Boutonnat.

In this video, the singer shows that "she does not dating relationships without violence". Because of her pain, Farmer, who was innocent and naive at the beginning of the video, became then corrupted and began to kill. She "kills her lover to not be killed. The horns are a symbol of the bull (power, fertility and virile strength) granted to a woman, but also that of the Devil who takes possession of Farmer. Helpless, she is witness to the lover's agony, overwhelmed and very human". There are also several references to sexuality (the snake in the Garden of Eden, symbolism of the bullfight in the Spanish culture). The themes of love and death are also present in the video. For biographer Violet, all the people belong to the same community, the bullfighter was unfaithful by impregnating a pregnant woman seen in the video, and Farmer "wears horns" literally as she has been deceived by her lover, and ultimately takes revenge by killing him.

Belgian writer and Farmer's friend Amélie Nothomb, spoke of this video in an excerpt from her 1997 book Attentat, with her character Ethel.

== Critical reception ==
France Soir considered that "Sans logique" had "its weight of synthetic sulfur" and that the words had "a preciousness from another era".

In France, the single charted for fifteen weeks on the French Top 50, from 18 March to 1 July 1989. It debuted at number 30 and reached its peaked position, number ten, five weeks later, spending a total of eleven weeks in the top twenty. Its sales were somewhat disappointing in comparison with the great success of two of the other three previous singles, "Sans contrefaçon" and "Pourvu qu'elles soient douces". On the European Hot 100 Singles, it debuted at number 68 on 1 April 1989, reached a peak of number 39 five weeks later, and fell off the chart after 14 weeks. Much played on radio, it charted for 12 weeks on the European Airplay Top 50, with a peak at number 20 for non consecutive two weeks.

== Promotion and live performances ==
Farmer performed "Sans logique" five times in four television shows in 1989, all on TF1: Avis de recherche (24 February and 12 May), La Une est à vous (11 March), Jacky show (18 March), Sacrée Soirée (22 March). Farmer, nominated for the Victoires de la musique, has won the title "Best female performer of the year", but refused to sing "Sans logique", which was very criticized by the media. For this song, the singer used for the first time a dynamic choreography that she named "the technical of mirror", because she has created it only by looking at herself in a mirror.

"Sans logique" was performed during the 1989 tour. Farmer then wore black veils, a white collar and small white socks and performed a collective choreography inspired by the 18th century, composed of large gestures and these movements become smaller as if Farmer was bound by twine. When the music began, Farmer curtseyed several times, and the phrase "This is a blank formatted diskette" was repeated throughout the song. About the middle of the song, the singer hit the ground with her microphone and got up again immediately. Awaited by fans since 30 years, "Sans Logique" was performed in her Live 2019 just after the opening song "Interstellaires", without choreography but in a version rearranged by the musical director of the show, Olivier Schultheis.

== B-side: "Dernier Sourire" ==
The vinyl's B-side contains a new song, "Dernier Sourire", which is very sad. This moving song tackles the theme of the disappearance of a loved one. With simple words, Farmer evokes the passage of the state of living to that of death through a description an ill-person in the process of dying in a hospital room, and the injustice felt in this kind of situation. This song was probably composed for Max Gautier, Farmer's father, who died on 11 July 1986, and in the lyrics she tells him some things she had not had time to say when he was alive. About its structure, the song has "a classic accompaniment, a simple melody and no refrain". After being chosen instead of "Que mon cœur lâche" to feature on the 1992 album Urgence – 27 artistes pour la recherche contre le SIDA, the song was especially re-recorded in a new version, becoming the anthem of people who come at the end of life and appeared to be as "a kind of cruel poem about the end of life and the injustice of death which blows too quickly our candles". The song was generally well received, as stated by the author Erwan Chuberre who provides in one of his books positive critics from fans.

Farmer performed the song first on 1 November 1989 on French television show Sacrée Soirée on TF1. It was originally scheduled to be performed during the 1989 tour, but it was eventually replaced by "Puisque...". The song was sung during the Mylenium Tour; when performing on stage, Farmer wore a white transparent dress with a plunging neckline in the back, a sailing on the shoulders, shoes with high heels, and a white large necklace. There is no choreography, and when she sang for the second time the first verse at the end of the song, she began to cry; she was only accompanied by the piano. In 2000, this live version was the second track of the CD single for "Dessine-moi un mouton". "Dernier Sourire" was covered by Michał Kwiatkowski on a weekly program of Star Academy France, in 2003, but his version was not released as a single.

== Formats and track listings ==
These are the formats and track listings of single releases of "Sans logique":

- 7" single – France

No.	Title	Length
1.	"Sans logique" (logical single mix)	4:00
2.	"Dernier sourire"	5:05

- 7" maxi / CD maxi – France

No.	Title	Length
1.	"Sans logique" (illogical club remix)	7:11
2.	"Dernier sourire"	5:05
3.	"Sans logique" (logical single mix)	4:00

- 7" maxi – Promo – France

No.	Title	Length
1.	"Sans logique" (logical single mix)	4:00
2.	"Sans logique" (classical version)	4:00

- 7" maxi – Promo – France

No.	Title	Length
1.	"Sans logique" (logical single mix)	4:00
2.	"Sans logique" (classical version)	4:00

- 7" single – Canada

No.	Title	Length
1.	"Sans logique" (logical single mix)	4:00
2.	"Dernier sourire"	5:04

- Digital download (since 2005)

No.	Title	Length
1.	"Sans logique" (Ainsi soit je... version)	4:30
2.	"Sans logique" (Les Mots version)	4:02
3.	"Sans logique" (1989 live version)	5:06
4.	"Sans logique" (illogical club remix)	7:11

== Release history ==
Date	Label	Region	Format	Catalog
20 February 1989	Polydor	France, Canada	7" single	871 646-7
20 February 1989	Polydor	France, Canada	7" maxi	871 647-1
20 February 1989	Polydor	France	CD maxi	871 647-2
20 February 1989	Polydor	France	7" single – Promo	6863 377

== Official versions ==
Version	Length	Album	Remixed by	Year	Comment
"Sans logique"
Album version	4:30	Ainsi soit je...	—	1988	See the previous sections
Logical single mix	4:00	—	Laurent Boutonnat	1989	A refrain is deleted at the end of the song.
Classical version	4:00	—	Laurent Boutonnat	1989	This version brings to the fore the Farmer's voice on flights of violins. After two minutes, drums sounds can be heard.
Illogical club remix	7:11	Dance Remixes	Laurent Boutonnat	1989	This is a dance remix. The phrase "This is a blank formatted disket" is mixed with a voice of a man.
Music video	5:37	Les Clips Vol. III, Music Videos I	—	1989	
Live version (recorded in 1989)	5:06	En Concert	—	1989	The phrase "This is a blank formatted disket" is repeated during all the song.
Album version	4:02	Les Mots	Laurent Boutonnat	2001	This is a remastered version.
Album version	4:02	Les Mots	Laurent Boutonnat	2001	This is a remastered version.
Live Version	3:51	Live 2019	Olivier Schultheis	2019	
"Dernier sourire"
Album version	4:00	Urgence – 27 artistes pour la recherche contre le SIDA	—	1992	The acoustic version is accompanied by a piano and a guitar. The musical passage at the end is deleted.
Live version (recorded in 2000)	4:52	Mylenium Tour	—	2000	This performance is moving.

== Credits and personnel ==
These are the credits and the personnel as they appear on the back of the single:

- Mylène Farmer – lyrics
- Laurent Boutonnat – music
- Bertrand Le Page / Toutankhamon – editions
- Polydor – recording company
- Marianne Rosentiehl – photo
- Thierry Rogen - Sound engineer - Mixing

== Charts and sales ==
=== Weekly charts ===
Chart (1989)	Peak position
Europe (European Airplay Top 50)	20
Europe (European Hot 100)	39
France (SNEP)	10

=== Sales ===
Sales for "Sans logique"
Region	Certification	Certified units/sales
France	—	250,000
