= À quoi je sers... =

Single by Mylène Farmer

from the album En Concert
- B-side: "La Veuve noire"
- Released: July 1989
- Recorded: 1989, France
- Genre: Dark wave
- Length: 4:35
- Label: Polydor
- Songwriters: Lyrics: Mylène Farmer; Music: Laurent Boutonnat
- Producer: Laurent Boutonnat

Mylène Farmer singles chronology
"Sans logique" (1989)	"À quoi je sers..." (1989)	"Allan (live)" (1989)

"À quoi je sers..." (English: "What good am I...") is a 1989 song recorded by French singer-songwriter Mylène Farmer. The song was a standalone single when it was released in July 1989, as it was previously unavailable on Farmer's albums, apart from a live version on En Concert. Marking the end of Farmer's first period of work, it achieved moderate commercial and popular success back then but is now considered a "Farmer classic".

== Background and writing ==
In May 1989, Farmer began her first tour throughout France, which was a great success. Farmer would probably wrote the lyrics of "À quoi je sers..." during this tour, as she was incredibly surprised by her success on stage and she expressed doubts about the direction of her musical career. The singer and her partner Laurent Boutonnat decided to record this song as new single, with another unpublished song on the B-side, "La Veuve noire", whose music is very similar to that of "À quoi je sers...". Both songs were recorded fairly quickly. However, due to the success of the previous single "Sans logique", "À quoi je sers..." was not released before July 1989. Little broadcast on radio, the song appeared as a synthesis of the singer's work and marked the end of the first period of Farmer's career.

== Lyrics and music ==
Mais mon Dieu de quoi j'ai l'air
Je sers à rien du tout
Et qui peut dire dans cet enfer
Ce qu'on attend de nous, j'avoue...

— Beginning of the chorus

French author Erwan Chuberre said "À quoi je sers..." is "a song with desperate lyrics but a dance rhythm that incorporates one of the favorite phrases of depressive people". The pessimistic song is about madness, the "desire of suicide and the impression of the futility of the life". The theme, as well as the beginning of each verse ("Poussière vivante") and other words in the lyrics ("Chaque heure demande pour qui pour quoi se redresser") were inspired by 1942 book L'Apprentissage de la ville by French writer Luc Dietrich, whose books are known to have a morbid tone. About the writing of the song, Farmer said in an interview: "I wrote "À quoi je sers..." shortly after the beginning of the tour. Because it was the question on my mind. (...). About this : to scream out loud what others will not dare do." According to the biographer Bernard Violet, the song which tackles "a new fantasy, self-destruction", is "filled with a special symbolism describing the passage from life to death" and "illustrates the strange torpor in which the singer seems to take refuge in the real life".

According to some observers, this song could summed up by itself, the entire universe, atmosphere and themes evoked in Farmer's work. The name of the song ends with three suspension points – not a question mark – suggesting "the singer had doubts about her usefulness on Earth". The black and white cover's photograph shows Farmer in her dressing room after one of her concerts at the Palais des Sports (Paris) drying a tear with a handkerchief. As a result, the song could refer to the "loneliness that invades an artist after his exit from the stage".

== Music video ==
Mylène Farmer who seems to be depressive on the boat in the music video "À quoi je sers...".

For the only time in Farmer's career, Laurent Boutonnat directed the video and wrote its screenplay (usually, it is Farmer who composes the latter). It is a Requiem Publishing production which was shot for two days in August 1989 on the Lac de Grand-Lieu (Loire Atlantique, France), with a budget of about 30,000 euros. Moreover, it is the first of Farmer's videos to be in black and white. All characters from Farmer's previous videos appear in "À quoi je sers...", however, as the actors who first performed the roles were not all free for the shooting, the characters are in fact body doubles in this video, except the toreador from "Sans logique". According to some sources, Farmer would have been seasick during the shooting. The actor who plays the boatman is Farmer's guitarist, Slim Pezin. During the shooting of the video, the weather was warm with a morning mist; however, Farmer did not remove her wool coat.

At the beginning of the video, Farmer stands at the side of a pond, with a suitcase in her hand. A man with large dark circles around his eyes appears on a boat through the fog and Farmer climbs aboard, sits down and seems to be very sad and thoughtful. Using a long paddle, the man rows to move the boat among the rushes. After a while, five silhouettes appear, walking on the water (these characters are Rasoukine ["Tristana"], the rival ["Libertine"], the puppeteer ["Sans contrefaçon"], the English captain ["Pourvu qu'elles soient douces"] and the torero ["Sans logique"]). Farmer joins them, while the boat goes away.

According to some analyses, the video is based on the text La Maison des morts, composed by the French poet Guillaume Apollinaire. In this case, the pond would represent the death; it also may be an allegory of the Styx, one of the rivers of Hell in Greek mythology, referring to the Farmer's passage from world of the living to that of the dead. As for the walk of the characters in the pond at the end of the video, it would evoke the idea that everyone is forced to continue his own life with his memories and his anxieties without asking too many questions.

== Critical reception ==
France Soir considered this single as a "miserable response to "On est tous des imbéciles" and "Sans logique"". In contrast, Spot Light qualified this song as "the more beautiful slow song of the year". Graffiti described "À quoi je sers" as "a fluid, slight and fast unforgettable song (...) which will arouse the interest of the crowds". For Jeune et Jolie, it was "one of the most beautiful texts that [Farmer] had ever sang".

The single, which was released only in France, was unable to reach the top ten. It started in the top 50 on 12 August at number 29 and reached a peak at number 16 six weeks later, and here stayed for two weeks. After this, it fell almost continuously and totaled fourteen weeks in the top 50. It remains Farmer's lowest peak position in France for one of her studio single. On the European Hot 100 Singles, it entered the chart on 26 August 1989 at a peak of number 67, where it stayed for another week, and fell off the chart after 11 weeks of presence. It also charted for nine weeks on the European Airplay Top 50, with a peak at number 21 on 14 October 1989.

== Promotion and live performances ==
In 1989, Farmer participated in three television shows in which she performed "À quoi je sers...": J'y crois dur comme terre (2 September, TF1), Sacrée Soirée (6 September, TF1), Avis de recherche (15 September, TF1).

"À quoi je sers..." was performed during the 1989 tour and is available on the live album En Concert, but it was not performed at Palais des Sports (Paris) in May, as the song was not created at the time. When she performed the song, Farmer wore black and white checked trousers and a grey jacket. The song was originally scheduled to be included in the set list of the Mylenuim Tour, as Farmer performed the song during the rehearsal in Marseille, but was finally replaced by "Il n'y a pas d'ailleurs". It was also performed during her 2009 tour and was thus included in the track listing of the live album N°5 on Tour. Farmer, who wore a glittering red cape with hood, was first seated on the stage stairs when she sang the first verse, then stood up. However, for the shows in Russia, the song was replaced by "L'amour n'est rien..." which was most aired in the country.

== B-side: "La Veuve noire" ==
The vinyl's B-side and the third track of the CD maxi contain a new song, "La Veuve noire", which was unpublished at the time. The song's title refers to a very small venomous spider that lives in the Mediterranean regions. In the lyrics, it addresses the theme of the singer's artistic death: Farmer personifies her experience of the stage in May 1989, which was her first tour, under the traits of this insect and lists some of its characteristics. In terms of music, many noises are added to the melody that actually samples the music of "À quoi je sers..." This song was never performed on stage, but appears on the compilation Les Mots.

== Formats and track listings ==
These are the formats and track listings of single releases of "À quoi je sers...":

- 7" single

No.	Title	Length
1.	"À quoi je sers..." (single version)	4:35
2.	"La Veuve noire"	4:13

- CD maxi / 7" maxi

No.	Title	Length
1.	"À quoi je sers..." (club remix)	7:50
2.	"La Veuve noire"	4:13
3.	"À quoi je sers..." (single version)	4:35

- 7" single – Promo

No.	Title	Length
1.	"À quoi je sers..." (single version)	4:39
2.	"À quoi je sers..." (orchestral version)	4:39

- Digital download

No.	Title	Length
1.	"À quoi je sers..." (single version)	4:35
2.	"À quoi je sers..." (1989 live version)	5:05
3.	"À quoi je sers..." (club remix)	7:50
4.	"À quoi je sers..." (2009 live version)	5:07

== Release history ==
Date	Label	Region	Format	Catalog
July 1989	Polydor	France	7" single	889 758-7
July 1989	Polydor	France	7" maxi	889 759-1
July 1989	Polydor	France	CD maxi	889 759-2
July 1989	Polydor	France	7" maxi – Promo	2029

== Official versions ==
Version	Length	Album	Remixed by	Year	Comment
Single version	4:30	Les Mots	—	1989	See the previous sections
Club remix	7:50	Dance Remixes	Laurent Boutonnat	1989	There are more musical bridges and, at the end, a male voice saying "Quoi" can be heard.
Orchestral version	4:30	—	Laurent Boutonnat	1989	In this instrumental version, all the lyrics are removed and Farmer only performs background vocals during the refrain, but without following the original melody.
Music video	4:58	Les Clips Vol. III, Music Videos I	—	1989	
Live version (recorded in 1989)	5:05	En Concert	—	1989	In this live version, similar to the original one, the introduction is slightly modified with a few guitar riffs, then the keyboard and the orchestra begin the song.
Live version (recorded in 2009)	5:07	N°5 on Tour	—	2009	This is an acoustic version.

== Credits and personnel ==
These are the credits and the personnel as they appear on the back of the single:

- Mylène Farmer – lyrics
- Laurent Boutonnat – music
- Thierry Rogen – recording and mixing at Studio Méga
- André Perriat / Top Master – engraving
- Requiem Publishing / Bertrand Le Page – editions
- Polydor – recording company
- Marianne Rosenstiehl / Sygma – photo
- Jean-Paul Théodule – design

== Charts and sales ==
=== Weekly charts ===
Chart (1989)	Peak position
Europe (European Airplay Top 50)	21
Europe (European Hot 100)	67
France (SNEP)	16

=== Sales ===
Sales for "À quoi je sers..."
Region	Certification	Certified units/sales
France	—	120,000
