= Que mon cœur lâche =

Single by Mylène Farmer

from the album Dance Remixes
- B-side: "Dub remix"
- Released: 23 November 1992
- Recorded: 1992, France
- Genre: Trip hop, new jack swing
- Length: 4:05 (French version); 4:15 (English version)
- Label: Polydor
- Songwriters: Mylène Farmer, Laurent Boutonnat
- Producer: Laurent Boutonnat

Mylène Farmer singles chronology
| "Beyond My Control" (1992) | "Que mon cœur lâche" (1992) | "XXL" (1995) |

Alternative cover
- English version

"Que mon cœur lâche" is a 1992 song recorded by the French singer-songwriter Mylène Farmer. The single was released on 23 November 1992 to promote Farmer's compilation album Dance Remixes. Farmer also recorded an English-language version of the track, "My Soul Is Slashed", which was released in May 1993. Originally recorded as a charity single, the song deals with AIDS and caused some controversy as lyrics seem to encourage the rejection of condoms. Produced as a short film, the music video was directed by the French film director Luc Besson, and features Farmer as an angel sent to Earth by God. The song reached the top ten in France and Belgium.

== Background and writing ==
=== French version ===
In 1992, the pop singer Étienne Daho contacted several popular French recording artists to request their participation in the recording of a double album whose profits were to be donated to the research against AIDS. Farmer, who had until then not participated in charitable causes, accepted. She and her writing partner Laurent Boutonnat composed "Que mon cœur lâche". However the song was rejected as the lyrics were considered to be too ambiguous, seeming to advocate sexual intercourse without condoms. As a result, instead of using "Que mon cœur lâche" for the charity album, Farmer re-recorded her 1988 song "Dernier sourire" (which dealt with the death of a sick person) in an acoustic style. This track was used for the compilation album Urgence – 27 artistes pour la recherche contre le SIDA.

At the same time, Farmer and Boutonnat decided to release their first compilation album composed of Remixes, Dance Remixes, in December 1992. To promote the album, the song "Que mon cœur lâche" was released as a single, which started airing on radio on 5 November 1992, although it aired for the first time four days before on M40, and released on 16 November. The single cover used a photograph by Marianne Rosenthiel, originally made for the previous single "Beyond My Control", in which Farmer trains in a gym. Unlike most of Farmer's singles, there was no CD maxi for this single.

=== English version ===
Farmer also recorded an English version of the song, entitled "My Soul Is Slashed" (the English title is not a direct translation of the French version, the title of which roughly translates to "My Heart Gives Up"). This was the second time that Farmer had recorded one of her singles in a foreign language (the first one being "My Mum Is Wrong" in 1984, the English version of "Maman a tort"). Mainly edited for Germany and the US, the song was translated by Ira Israel in collaboration with Mylène Farmer. In an interview, Ira Israel said that it was especially difficult to write the lyrics of "My Soul Is Slashed" as Farmer was insistent that the song had to convey the right wording, rhythm, meaning, and feeling of the original, rather than being a direct and literal translation. Farmer disliked the first text he had composed and, as a result, they worked together on the English lyrics.

The cover of "My Soul is Slashed" is similar to that of the French version, but with a black background. The English version of the song has never been performed on television or at Farmer's concerts, and is only available on the European version of the compilation Dance Remixes and on the long-box version of Farmer's 2001 greatest hits package Les Mots. Despite hopes that it would establish Farmer in the UK and the US, the English version was commercially unsuccessful. The song was used for the 1991 Japanese movie My Soul Is Slashed as ending credits for English bootleg release of the movie.

== Lyrics and music ==
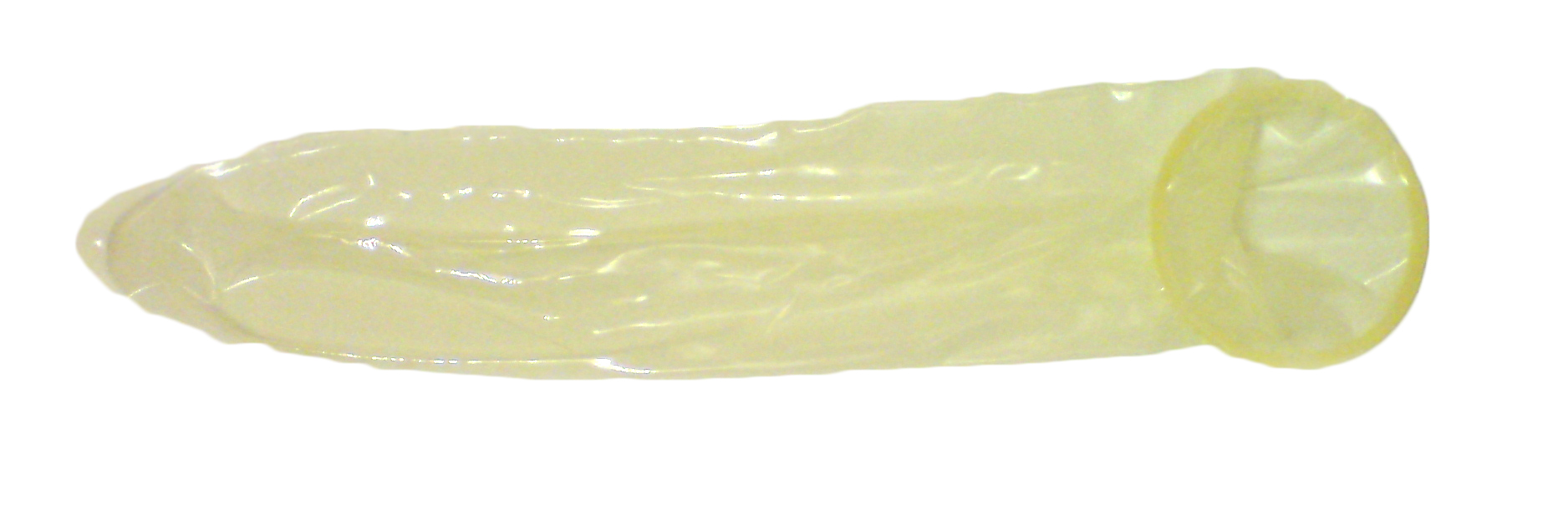
Condom is the main subject of "Que mon cœur lâche". In the lyrics, French word "caoutchouc" (i.e. "rubber" in English) is a metonymy which refers to it.

"Que mon cœur lâche" deals with the themes of AIDS and condoms. The text is very committed and is similar to that of "Sid'amour à mort" written by Barbara. Contrary to what some people thought, Farmer's text does not recommend against using condoms, but is simply an observation on this subject, on the complications that it entails. In an interview, the singer said: "I tried not to make any commitment. Should we save or not save a condom? It seems to me obviously need to save, but it is not the message I wanted to convey in the song. There is no message elsewhere in the song, simply an observation on love today. Love perverted by the threat of the disease, by the issue of condoms, which arose at the outset that we feel an impetus to another person. Clearly, I say that everyone should take responsibility toward the disease. Everybody is indeed faced with this reality, and I find it sad. Using a condom is not something loose. In the current situation, an appropriate course to guard against the disease seems to go without saying".

== Music video ==
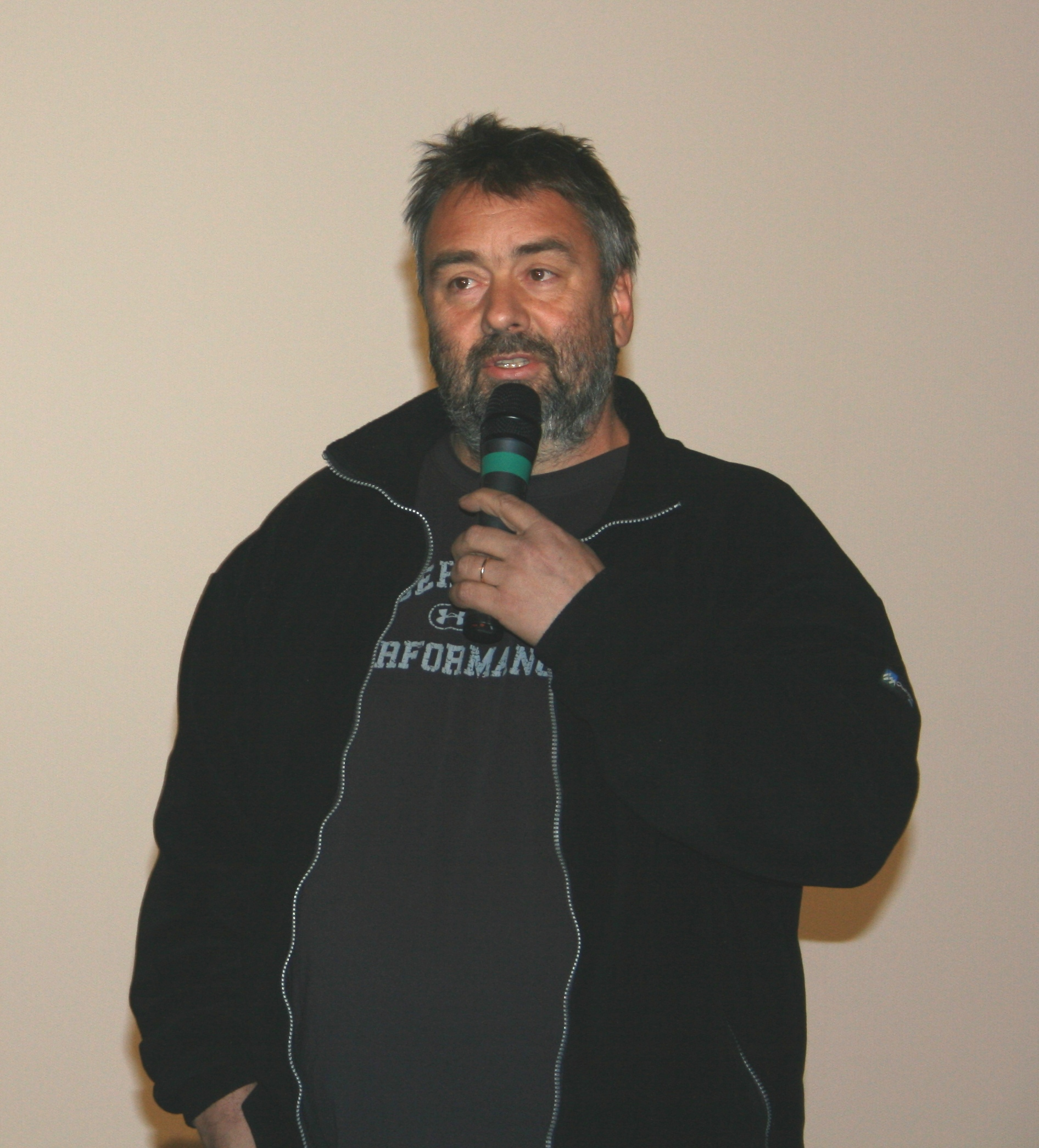
French film director Luc Besson directed the music video for "Que mon cœur lâche".

=== Production ===
For the first time in Farmer's singing career, Laurent Boutonnat did not direct the song's video, as he was busy working on his feature film Giorgino. Thus, with Boutonnat's agreement, French film director, writer and producer Luc Besson shot the video (Farmer had previously been an extra in his 1983 film Le Dernier Combat). The video, which lasts 6:44, was filmed over four days at the studios of Arpajon, France, with a budget of around 100,000 euros. The white garment worn by Farmer was made by Azzedine Alaia and the black one by Jean-Paul Gaultier.

There are three versions of the video : a first version with French subtitles, featured on Farmer's VHS and DVD, a second version with no subtitles and no title at the beginning, and a third version for "My Soul Is Slashed", similar to that of "Que mon cœur lâche". Before the song begins in the video, dialogue between Farmer and the two people who respectively portray God and Jesus, are in English language. The video also briefly features a Michael Jackson impersonator. The final scene in which Farmer blows a bubble with her chewing gum refers to a similar scene in Besson's film La Femme Nikita. The video was broadcast for the first time on M6, on 12 December 1992.

=== Plot ===
At the beginning of the video, an old man dressed with a fancy suit – God, in Paradise – reads a newspaper with disgust, saying "Jesus Christ", which prompts the appearance of Christ, although God replies that "it's just an expression they have down there". Thinking that humans have damaged love, he decides to send his best angel to Earth to hold an investigation. Farmer, the chosen angel, appears. She's dressed in white as a ballerina. Initially she does not hear what God tells her because she is listening to music on a walkman (the song being played is actually the 'extended dance remix' version of "Que mon cœur lâche"). Once she's on Earth, the song begins. Blowing a black feather from her wrist she discovers three pairs of lovers : one couple who are quarrelling, the second one very modest and the third one very libertine. She goes near the entrance of a nightclub called 'Q', guarded by a large man. Two men, an older one and a younger one, are not allowed to go into this discothèque and get slapped in the face; the angel offers them to breathe in an oxygen ball. In between, a muscular young man in panties appears and begins to dance. Michael Jackson appears, briefly performing some of his signature dance moves, only to be crushed when a huge cross falls from the sky, accidentally dropped by Jesus. The angel is quite intrigued by the nightclub, so she dresses up in black clothes, blows a white feather from her wrist and enters into the discothèque. There, she sees people with ambiguous sexuality who are walking in a corridor made of white curtains. A topless woman makes her breathe from an oxygen mask, the angel's heart beats faster and faster and eventually explodes. After that, the angel, now very sexily dressed, comes back to Paradise and pops a bubble of gum in front of God.

=== Inspiration and interpretation ===
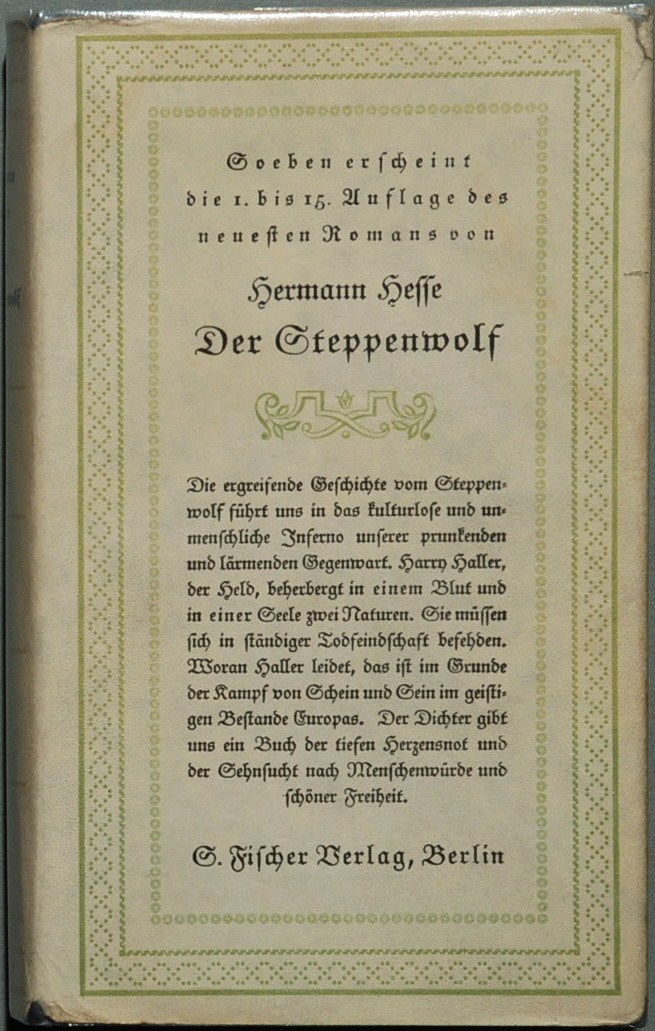
Hermann Hesse's novel Steppenwolf is one of the sources of inspiration of the music video.

Instant-Mag said the video was inspired by Federico Fellini and Mel Brooks' works, and especially by David Lynch's movie Blue Velvet. Indeed, as in this film, the video alternates between imaginary elements and real situations, while the use of an oxygen mask is a direct callback. It symbolizes the fact that "every person is looking for his drunkenness which can lead to extreme erotic games". It is an allegory of what fuels desire. The club named 'Q' in the video may be a reference both to the novel Steppenwolf, written by Hermann Hesse, but also to the bar "One-Eyed Jack" in Twin Peaks, in which the heroine Laura Palmer has lost her innocence being fascinated by this bar where fantasies can be satisfied. The message of this video is that, "behind the appearance of propriety is bursting the world of fantasies and its attractiveness".

This video is also very critical of religions : God is presented as a very austere businessman. Moreover, according to some analyses, the video explains that to give free rein to sexual fantasies, it necessary to transgress social and religious norms (respectively represented by the bouncer and God). As for the white curtains within the nightclub, they would be a symbol of the hymen or condoms. This video is very different from previous ones of Farmer, as it is much more humorous and ironic, especially when Jesus asks God: "Father, why don't you send me on Earth?" and the latter replied: "The last time, it was a disaster". Farmer said that these dialogues were as a "smile", a "fickleness" she had not displayed in her former videos.

== Promotion and live performances ==
Farmer performed the song in two French television shows : in Stars 90 (TF1) on 11 January 1993, and in World Music Awards (TMC) on 13 May 1993; on that occasion she received the award for the French-speaking artist who sold the most records in 1992. For these performances, the singer wore a white bathrobe and performed a choreographied dance with two female dancers.

"Que mon cœur lâche" was sung in a rock version during the 1996 tour and was thus included on the live album and VHS/DVD Live à Bercy. The song was accompanied by a sexy choreography in which Farmer is dancing around a vertical iron bar and was surrounded by muscular male dancers in Plexiglas bubbles with bare buttocks. The song was also performed during the Mylenium Tour in 2000, but only in the shows in Russia.

== Chart performances ==
In France, the single debuted at number 14 on 5 December 1992 and reached number 9 four weeks later. The song stayed a total of seventeen weeks in the top 50, twelve of them in the top 20. In Belgium (Wallonia), the single entered the chart at number 25, peaked at number 8 for two consecutive weeks and remained for nine weeks in the top 30.

== Formats and track listings ==
These are the formats and track listings of single releases of "Que mon cœur lâche" and "My Soul Is Slashed":

"Que mon cœur lâche"

- 7" single / 7" single – Limited edition (200) / CD single – Black CD / CD single – White CD / Cassette

| No. | Title | Length |
|---|---|---|
| 1. | "Que mon cœur lâche" (single version) | 4:05 |
| 2. | "Que mon cœur lâche" (dub remix) | 4:18 |

- 7" maxi

| No. | Title | Length |
|---|---|---|
| 1. | "Que mon cœur lâche" (extended dance remix) | 8:10 |
| 2. | "Que mon cœur lâche" (damage club remix) | 6:20 |

- Digital download

| No. | Title | Length |
|---|---|---|
| 1. | "Que mon cœur lâche" (single version) | 4:05 |
| 2. | "Que mon cœur lâche" (extended dance remix) | 8:10 |
| 3. | "Que mon cœur lâche" (1996 live version) | 4:35 |

- CD single – Promo – Crucifix

| No. | Title | Length |
|---|---|---|
| 1. | "Que mon cœur lâche" (single version) | 4:10 |

"My Soul Is Slashed"

- CD single – Germany

| No. | Title | Length |
|---|---|---|
| 1. | "My Soul Is Slashed" (single mix) | 4:15 |
| 2. | "Que mon cœur lâche" (French single mix) | 4:10 |

- CD maxi – Germany

| No. | Title | Length |
|---|---|---|
| 1. | "My Soul Is Slashed" (single mix) | 4:15 |
| 2. | "My Soul Is Slashed" (the rubber remix) | 7:34 |
| 3. | "Que mon cœur lâche" (extended French dance remix) | 8:10 |

- CD single – Promo – France

| No. | Title | Length |
|---|---|---|
| 1. | "My Soul Is Slashed" (the rubber remix) | 7:34 |
| 2. | "My Soul Is Slashed" (single mix) | 4:15 |

== Release history ==
| Date | Label | Region | Format | Catalog |
|---|---|---|---|---|
| October 1992 | Polydor | France | CD single – Promo | 4288 |
| 23 November 1992 | Polydor | France | 7" single | 861 206-7 |
| 23 November 1992 | Polydor | France | CD single | 861 206-2 |
| 23 November 1992 | Polydor | France | 7" maxi | 861 207-1 |
| 23 November 1992 | Polydor | France | Cassette | 865 820-4 |
| 1993 | Polydor | France | 7" maxi – Promo | 2321 |
| 1993 | Polydor | Germany | CD single | 861814-2 |
| 1993 | Polydor | Germany | CD maxi | 861815-2 |

== Official versions ==
| Version!! Length | Album | Remixed by | Year | Comment | |
"Que mon cœur lâche"
| Single / Album version | 4:05 | Les Mots / Plus grandir | — | 1992 | See the previous sections |
| Promotional Single Version | 4:05 | — | — | 1992 | This version is the same as the single version. It is only available on French promotional CD single and on the German CD single of "My Soul Is Slashed", under the name 'French Single Mix'. |
| Dub Remix | 4:18 | — | Laurent Boutonnat, Thierry Rogen | 1992 | This is a dance remix with an a cappella introduction in which Farmer sings the refrain. Many violins can be heard in the musical bridge also similar to the 'Damaged Club Mix'. |
| Extended Dance Remix | 8:10 | Dance Remixes | Laurent Boutonnat, Thierry Rogen | 1992 | This is a dance remix devoted to the nightclubs. This version is also available on the German CD maxi of "My Soul Is Slashed", under the name of 'Extended French Dance Remix'. |
| Damaged Club Mix | 6:20 | — | Laurent Boutonnat, Thierry Rogen | 1992 | This remix, which contains the whole of lyrics from the original version, is slower than the 'Extended Club Remix'. Many violins can be heard in the musical bridge. |
| Music video | 6:44 | Music Videos II, Music Videos II & III | — | 1992 | |
| Live version (recorded in 1996) | 4:35 | — | — | 1992 | This version is similar to the album one but has more rock sounds. See Live à Bercy. |
"My Soul Is Slashed"
| Single Mix | 4:15 | Les Mots / Plus grandir (long box edition) | Laurent Boutonnat | 1993 | This is the English version of "Que mon cœur lâche", but lyrics are different. |
| The Rubber Remix | 7:34 | Dance Remixes | Laurent Boutonnat | 1993 | This is a dance version with a musical introduction that lasts about two minutes. |

== Credits and personnel ==
These are the credits and the personnel as they appear on the back of the single:

- Mylène Farmer – lyrics
- Laurent Boutonnat – music
- Bertrand Le Page and Toutankhamon – editions
- Polydor – recording company
- Marianne Rosensthiel – photo

== Charts and sales ==
| Chart (1992) | Peak position |
|---|---|
| Belgian (Wallonia) Singles Chart | 8 |
| Europe (European Hot 100 Singles) | 40 |
| French SNEP Singles Chart | 9 |
| Quebec (ADISQ) | 16 |

| Country | Certification | Physical sales |
|---|---|---|
| France | — | 120,000 (French version) |
| France | — | 70,000 (English version) |
