= Beyond My Control =

Single by Mylène Farmer

from the album L'autre...
- B-side: "Ya ya version"
- Released: 13 April 1992
- Recorded: 1991, France
- Genre: Darkwave, synthpop
- Length: 5:24
- Label: Polydor
- Songwriters: Lyrics: Mylène Farmer; Music: Laurent Boutonnat
- Producer: Laurent Boutonnat

Mylène Farmer singles chronology
"Je t'aime mélancolie" (1991)	"Beyond My Control" (1992)	"Que mon cœur lâche" (1992)

Alternative cover
- 12" maxi

"Beyond My Control" is a 1991 song recorded by French singer-songwriter Mylène Farmer. It was the fourth single from her third studio album L'autre... and was released in May 1992. The song probably remains well known for its controversial music video, censored upon release due to its sexual and violent content. It achieved minor success in terms of sales, even though it reached the top ten in France and Belgium.

== Background, writing and release ==
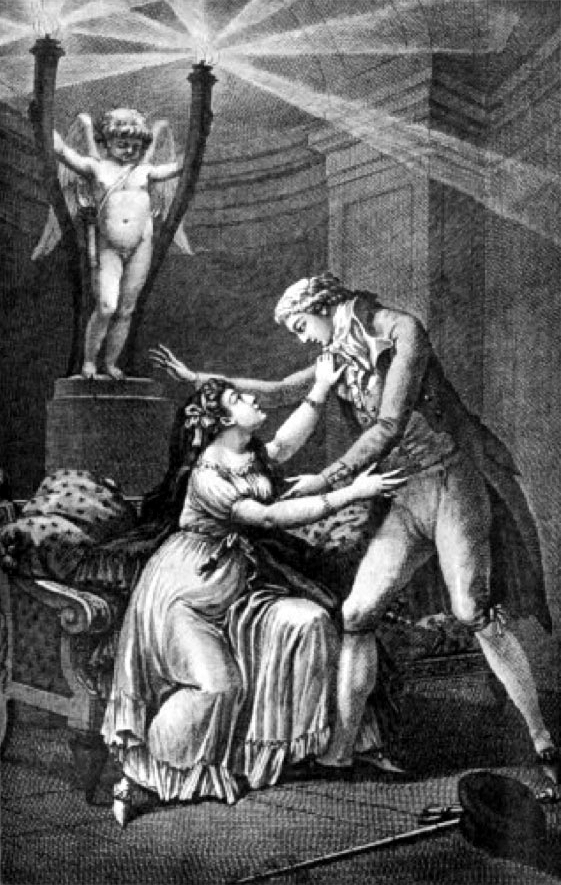
The song draws its inspiration in French epistolary novel Les Liaisons dangereuses.

The fickle and ambiguous song "Pas de doute", already scheduled as the third single from the album L'autre..., would have been released as the fourth single, but was finally replaced by "Beyond My Control", which was remixed to be more commercial.

The song was inspired by two characters in the 1782 French epistolary novel Les Liaisons dangereuses, written by Pierre Choderlos de Laclos: the Marquise de Merteuil and the Vicomte de Valmont. In the song, the voice heard on the chorus of the song which repeats "It's beyond my control" is in fact a sample of John Malkovich's voice from the film "Dangerous Liaisons" by Stephen Frears.

For the first time throughout Farmer's career, a CD single was released among the various formats. At the time of the song's release, the radio NRJ prepared a 7" maxi with a collector picture disc in a limited edition (50 units) and containing a new remix.

The song deals with self-control, love, death and the betrayal of the beloved man. Farmer tells her own story from the Valmont's sentence ("it's beyond my control"): that of a woman who kills her unfaithful lover after a night of love.

== Music video ==
Mylène Farmer biting Frédéric Lagache, her lover in the very controversial video for "Beyond My Control".

The video was directed by Laurent Boutonnat who also wrote the screenplay based on the book "Les Liaisons dangereuses", by Choderlos de Laclos. It would be his last video for Farmer before "Les Mots", produced nine years later.

The video was shot for two days at Studio Sets in Stains (where the video of "Plus grandir" was shot in 1985) and cost 45,000 euros, a limited budget due to contemporaneous production of the film Giorgino. A Requiem Publishing and Heathcliff SA production, the video features Farmer, Frédéric Lagache (the puppeteer in the video of "Sans contrefaçon") as her flighty lover, and Christophe Danchaud, a dancer of Farmer's tours, as Lagache's body double. Photographer Marianne Rosensthiel, who witnessed the shooting of the video, said that the white dress worn by Farmer was custom-made by a seamstress.

In the video, Farmer, tied on an ignited pyre, tries to struggle. Interspersed are scenes of her kissing her lover before walking on embers in a white dress, her hands covered in blood. Farmer enters a home and surprises her lover, who is engaged sexually with another woman. The scenes are very erotic. Farmer bites her lover in the shoulder and some blood trickles along his back; they kiss and some blood flows from their mouths. Two wolves voraciously tear apart the body of a dead man.

The video, with many explicit scenes of sex and violence, was censored from its release, with extensive criticism in the media. Polydor proposed to French television host Michel Drucker that he could premiere the video on his show Champs-Élysées on France 2, but he categorically refused. M6 decided to bill it in full version only after midnight, although the Conseil supérieur de l'audiovisuel did not prohibit it. Canal + agreed to broadcast it in the show Top 50, where the programmer confessed she did not find the video so shocking. and for the channel MCM, it asked advice of its television viewers who had voted for or against. Many journalists from various newspapers expressed concerns about the video and French magazine Star Music even qualified it as a "crap". This video was often seen by the general public as a pretext for showing salacious images. However, biographer Bernard Violet believes that the video marked the end of an era in Farmer's career, as she changed from more sophisticated scenarios to placing more emphasis on the song. According to journalist Caroline Beet, the bloody kissing between Farmer and her lover refers to a cannibalistic practice aiming to feed on the strength of one's enemy.

Farmer claimed that she liked the blood and nudity of this video, and that her relationships with men were very difficult at the time.

== Live performances ==
"Beyond My Control" was never performed on television. It was only sung during the 2000 Mylenium Tour. A recording of the performance is available on the VHS or DVD Mylenium Tour live album, but on this occasion, Malkovich's voice was replaced and the original choreography was abandoned. Farmer wore an orange costume composed of privateer trousers, a thick jacket and orange shoes with high heels. Her dancers had different coloured costumes. At the beginning of the song, Farmer asked the audience to clap their hands.

== Chart performances ==
In France, the single started at number ten on 9 May 1992 on the singles chart, reached twice a peak at number eight on 16 May and 6 June, but dropped rather quickly and fell off the top 50 after eleven weeks. The single started at number 21 on the Belgian (Wallonia) Singles Chart and reached number ten four weeks later; it remained for twelve weeks in the top 30. Thus the single chart trajectories and sales were rather disappointing in comparison with the other three singles off L'autre....

== Formats and track listings ==
These are the formats and track listings of single releases of "Beyond My Control":

- 7" single – France, Germany

No.	Title	Length
1.	"Beyond My Control" (single version)	4:45
2.	"Beyond My Control" (ya ya version)	4:40

- CD single, cassette, CD single – Promo – France

No.	Title	Length
1.	"Beyond My Control" (single version)	4:55
2.	"Beyond My Control" (ya ya version)	5:20

- CD maxi – France, Germany

No.	Title	Length
1.	"Beyond My Control" (single mix)	5:24
2.	"Beyond My Control" (godforsaken mix)	8:03
3.	"Beyond My Control" (under control remix)	7:04
4.	"Beyond My Control" (raven mix)	6:02

- 12" maxi – France, Europe

No.	Title	Length
1.	"Beyond My Control" (godforsaken mix)	8:03
2.	"Beyond My Control" (under control remix)	7:09
3.	"Beyond My Control" (the raven mix)	6:02

- Digital download

No.	Title	Length
1.	"Beyond My Control" (album version)	5:22
2.	"Beyond My Control" (2000 live version)	5:18
3.	"Beyond My Control" (godforsaken mix)	8:03

- CD single – Promo – Without case – Canada

No.	Title	Length
1.	"Beyond My Control" (album version)	5:22
2.	"Beyond My Control" (single mix)	5:24
3.	"Beyond My Control" (godforsaken mix)	8:03
4.	"Beyond My Control" (under control remix)	7:09
5.	"Beyond My Control" (the raven mix)	6:02

- 12" maxi – Promo – Picture disc

No.	Title	Length
1.	"Beyond My Control" (single mix)	5:24
2.	"Beyond My Control" (the raven mix)	6:02

== Release history ==
Date	Label	Region	Format	Catalog
March 1992	PCD	Canada	CD single – Promo	162
March 1992	Polydor	France, Belgium	CD single – Promo	4230
March 1992	Polydor	France, Belgium	12" maxi – Promo	—
13 April 1992	Polydor	France, Belgium	7" single	865 820–7
13 April 1992	Polydor	France, Belgium	CD single	865 820–2
13 April 1992	Polydor	France, Belgium	7" maxi	865 821–1
13 April 1992	Polydor	France, Belgium	CD maxi	865 821–2
13 April 1992	Polydor	France, Belgium	Cassette	865 820–4
May 1992	Polydor	Germany	7" single	865 820–7
May 1992	Polydor	Germany	CD maxi	865 821–2

== Official versions ==
Version	Length	Album	Remixed by	Year	Comment
Album version	5:22	L'autre...	—	1991	See the previous sections
Single version	4:45	—	Laurent Boutonnat	1992	This version is shorter as the last refrain is delated. A guitar has been added to give dance sonorities. Unlike the album version, the song ends with a musical passage added.
Single version 2	4:56	—	Laurent Boutonnat	1991	This version is shorter because the last refrain is delated. It ends with John Malkovich's voice.
Single mix	5:24	Les Mots	Laurent Boutonnat	1992	Guitar riffs were added.
Ya ya version	4:40	—	Laurent Boutonnat	1992	This is an instrumental version punctuated by the onomatopoeia "Ya ya" sung by Farmer, and the phrase "It's beyond my control" repeated by Malkovitch.
Ya ya single version	5:20	—	Laurent Boutonnat	1992	It is the same version as the 'Ya Ya Version', but longer. The last "It's beyond my control", by Malkovich, is totally distorted.
Music video	5:00	L'autre, Music Videos I	—	1992	
Godforsaken mix	8:03	Dance Remixes	Laurent Boutonnat	1992	In this version, the introduction (about 2:00) is composed of guitar riffs, Malkovitch's voice, the word "Lâche" repeated by Farmer and a cry of a man.
Under control remix	7:09	—	Laurent Boutonnat	1992	The introduction, almost entirely instrumental, lasts four minutes. Then, the refrain is sung five times.
The raven mix	6:02	—	Laurent Boutonnat	1992	It is an instrumental version, but with the voice of Malkovitch. A completely distorted cry can be heard at about the end of the song.
Live version (recorded in 2000)	5:18 (audio); 5:21 (video)	Mylenium Tour	—	2000	This version is similar to that of the album, but Malkovich's voice is replaced. See Mylenium Tour

== Credits and personnel ==
These are the credits and the personnel as they appear on the back of the single:

- Mylène Farmer – lyrics
- Laurent Boutonnat – music
- Requiem Publishing – editions
- Polydor – recording company
- Marianne Rosensthiel – photo
- Henry Neu / Com'N.B – design

== Charts and sales ==
Chart (1991/92)	Peak position
Belgian (Wallonia) Singles Chart	10
Europe (European Hot 100)	51
French SNEP Singles Chart	3
Quebec (ADISQ)	32

Country	Certification	Physical sales
France	Should be Silver	180,000
