= Music Videos I =

Music Videos

Video by Mylène Farmer
- Released: April 1997 (VHS); March 2001 (DVD)
- Recorded: 1984–1992
- Label: Polydor

Mylène Farmer chronology
L'autre (1992)	Music Videos (1997)	Music Videos II (1997)

Music Videos, also referred to as Music Videos I, is a compilation of music videos by the French singer Mylène Farmer, containing all of her videos from 1984 to 1992. It was originally released on VHS in April 1997, then on DVD in 2000. A LaserDisc edition, also released in 1997, combined this compilation with the following Music Videos II.

This VHS includes all videos (except "Maman a tort") from Farmer's first three albums: Cendres de lune, Ainsi soit je... and L'Autre... The DVD also includes the 1984 video for "Maman a tort", the videos of two live singles, and two behind-the-scenes features.

== Track listing ==
No.	Title	Album	Year	Length
1	"Plus grandir"	Cendres de lune	1985	7:32
2	"Libertine"	Cendres de lune	1986	10:53
3	"Pourvu qu'elles soient douces"	Ainsi soit je...	1989	17:52
4	"Tristana"	Cendres de lune	1987	11:33
5	"Sans contrefaçon"	Ainsi soit je...	1987	8:43
6	"Ainsi soit je..."	Ainsi soit je...	1988	5:23
7	"Sans logique"	Ainsi soit je...	1989	5:37
8	"À quoi je sers..."	single only	1989	4:58
9	"Désenchantée"	L'autre...	1991	10:12
10	"Regrets"	L'autre...	1991	6:17
11	"Je t'aime mélancolie"	L'autre...	1991	5:13
12	"Beyond My Control"	L'autre...	1992	5:00

=== DVD bonus features ===
No.	Title	Album	Year	Length
13	"Maman a tort"	Cendres de lune	1984	3:50
14	"Allan" (live)	En concert	1990	5:42
15	"Plus grandir" (live)	En concert	1990	4:50
16	Dans les coulisses de "Pourvu qu'elles soient douces"	—N/a	1989	
17	Sur le tournage du clip "Désenchantée"	—N/a	1991	

== Personnel ==
- Videos directed by Laurent Boutonnat
  - Behind-the-scenes videos directed by François Hanss
- Music by Laurent Boutonnat
  - "Libertine": music by Jean-Claude Dequéant
  - "Maman a tort": music by Jean Dahan and Laurent Boutonnat
- Lyrics by Mylène Farmer
  - "Libertine": lyrics by Laurent Boutonnat
  - "Maman a tort": lyrics by Jean Dahan
- Music produced by Laurent Boutonnat

== Certifications and sales ==
Region	Certification	Certified units/sales
France (SNEP)	Diamond	60,000^{*}
^{*} Sales figures based on certification alone.

== Charts ==
Chart (2003)	Peak position
French Videos Chart	8

Note: The French Videos Chart started on 4 October 2003. This video album was probably ranked higher before.
