= Allan (song) =

Single by Mylène Farmer

from the album En Concert
- B-side: "Psychiatric"
- Released: December 1989
- Recorded: 1989
- Genre: Synthpop
- Length: 4:46 (album version); 6:50 (live album version); 5:14 (live single version)
- Label: Polydor
- Songwriters: Lyrics: Mylène Farmer; Music: Laurent Boutonnat
- Producer: Laurent Boutonnat

Mylène Farmer singles chronology
"À quoi je sers..." (1989)	"Allan" (1989)	"Plus grandir (live)" (1990)

"Allan" is a 1988 song recorded by French singer-songwriter Mylène Farmer from her second album, Ainsi soit je... It was the first single from her first live album, En Concert, released in December 1989. The lyrics clearly refer to a fairy tale by Edgar Allan Poe, mentioning one of his characters. Although the single met with success in discothèques, its sales remained relatively low in comparison with Farmer's other singles.

== Background and lyrics ==
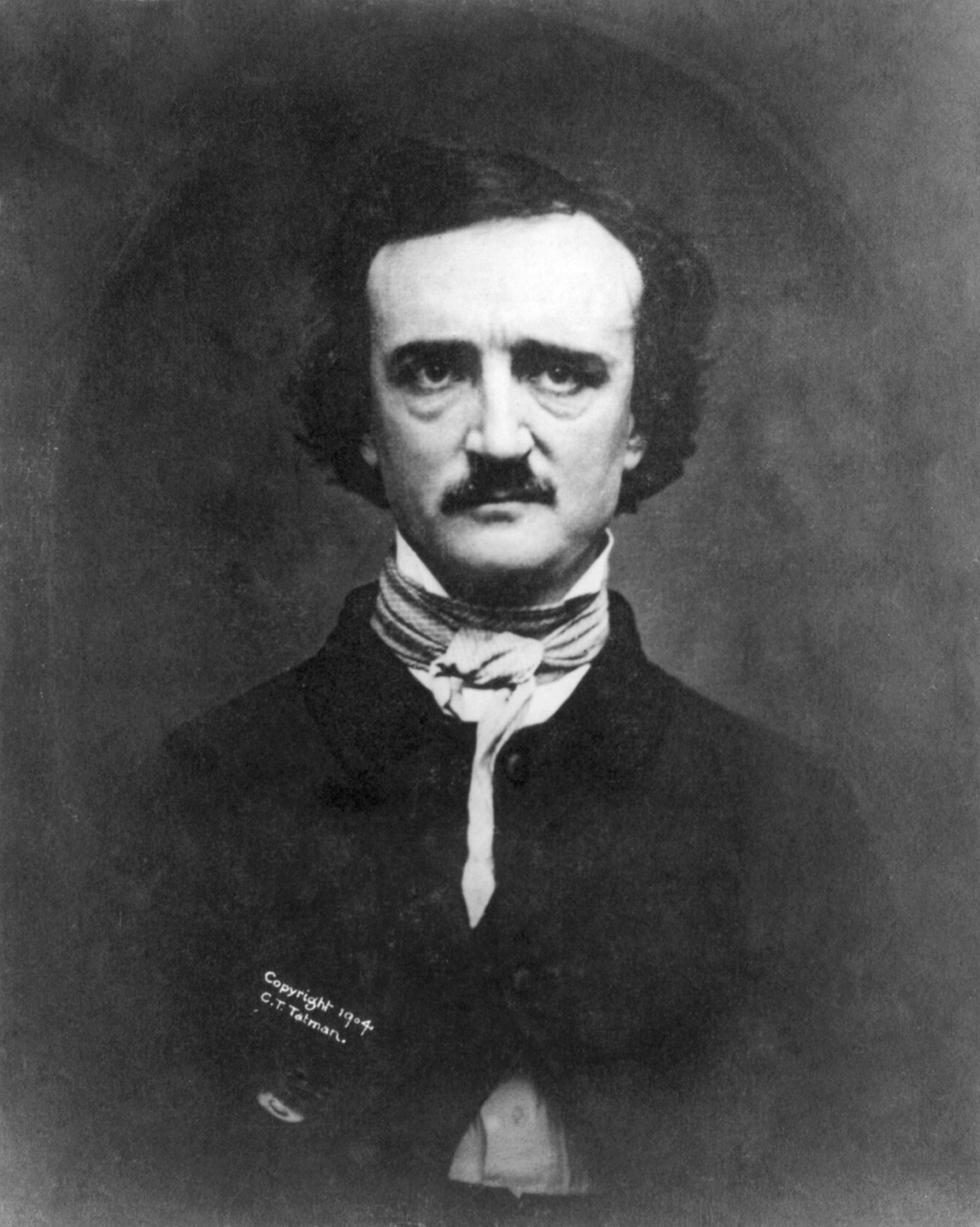
Song's lyrics and title refer to American poet Edgar Allan Poe.

The song "Allan" was chosen as the first single from the 1989 concert before the live album En Concert was released. Unlike Farmer's previous singles, the B-side of the vinyl was not another live song, but the first version of "Psychiatric" (the 'new beat remix'), which appeared two years later on the album "L'autre...".

"Allan" is a tribute to Edgar Allan Poe, an American poet, that Farmer is very appreciative and that she has evoked in many interviews. One verse of the song containing the word "Ligeia" which refers to the name of Poe's fairy tale published in 1837 in the review The American Museum. Farmer also sings "Pauvres poupées / Qui vont qui viennent", which is an excerpt from "Ligeia".

In the refrain, the singer slips into the skin of Lady Rowena, one of the heroines of the fairy tale, who died but was reborn in the guise of another woman. In the lyrics, Farmer addresses this death woman as if she was her blood sister. Thus the singer "appropriates Poe's literary work giving another dimension, her own". The French magazine Top Secrets tried to give an interpretation of the lyrics, noting several references to Poe's life in the song.

== Music video ==
The video, a 5:42 Requiem Publishing production, was directed by Laurent Boutonnat, and François Hanss, who filmed several subsequent videos for Farmer including "Je te rends ton amour", "Innamoramento", "Dessine-moi un mouton", "Redonne-moi", "Avant que l'ombre..." and "Déshabillez-moi", made all the important shots, with a budget of about 30,000 euros. The screenplay was written both by Boutonnat and Hanss. It was shot for two days in Marne-la-Vallée, France: one day for the monk and the white horse, and another for Farmer and the stage's decoration ignited. Two explosives and a rocket-flame were needed to set fire to the stage. In the video, Farmer appeared on stage, her face bathed in sweat and locks of hair pasted to her forehead, then she is in front of a cemetery.

The video's backstage were filmed by an amateur who sold unofficially this video; it contains many secrets of the 1989 concert tour's video, and that of "Allan" (for example, Farmer slips on the dress for the video in her car because there was no dressing room on the stage). In the video, the monk who opened the cemetery's gates which were used as stage's set during Farmer's concert lights the fire to this set. The scene takes places in a field. The photograph of Edgar Allan Poe burns in the video.

In 1990, in the Toutankhamon studios, the novelist Philippe Séguy attended exclusively to the showing of the music video, accompanied by Farmer and Boutonnat. According to an analysis made by the biographer Bernard Violet, "Boutonnat grafts his own imagination on that of Edgar Poe: two worlds of confusion illustrated by this tornado of fades in which a black horse tramples the portrait of American writer ( ...). The song begins with the cries of the crowd which here have a different meaning of specific hysteria of the singer's shows. Faces of spectators spring superimposed at the bottom of the frame, giving the illusion of a strange fire fueled by their cheering."

"Allan" does not feature on the VHS En Concert, but as well as the video of the following single "Plus grandir", was included on Les Clips vol. III, as both songs were released as live singles.

== Reception and live performances ==
According to Star Music, "Allan" is a "sad" but "beautiful" song with "dance" sonorities. On the French SNEP Top 50 Singles Chart, the song was listed for eight weeks, from 13 January to 3 March 1990, peaking at number 32 in its fourth week. Its remixes were bigger successes in discothèques. In April 2018, as the song was re-edited under new formats.

Farmer performed the song about two years before the single's release, in the French television show Fête comme chez vous, broadcast on Antenne 2 on 5 May 1988. The song, however, was not included on the best of Les Mots. "Allan" was only sung during the 1989 tour in an unchoreographied performance, in which Farmer wears black and white checked trousers and a grey jacket.

== B-side: "Psychiatric" ==
"Psychiatric" is the name of the song that features on the B-side of vinyl. At the time, it was an unreleased song since it was not included on any Farmer's album. It appeared for the first time on an album in 1991, on L'autre..., that was released about two years after "Allan". It was neither performed on television nor on stage. Farmer explained that she decided to write this song after seeing a documentary about "an insane asylum in Greece where the internees were abandoned, left to themselves and reduced to an animal status", and added: "Madness affectes me, simply".

This song is mainly instrumental. The music is "disturbing" and has dance sonorities, and some gimmicks and sound effects are added. When "Dégénération" was released in 2008, some critics have compared it to "Psychiatric" because of their similar music. "Psychiatric" is entirely sung in English-language and is a tribute to David Lynch's film, Elephant Man. John Hurt's voice is sampled throughout the song, repeating several times: "I'm a human being, I'm not an animal". A male voice punctuates the song with the word "Psychiatric", while Farmer sings only: "It's easy this time, to lose my mind". There are three versions of this song.

== Formats and track listings ==
These are the formats and track listings of single releases of "Allan":

- 7" single

No.	Title	Length
1.	"Allan" (live version)	5:15
2.	"Psychiatric" (7" version)	4:00

- 7" maxi

No.	Title	Length
1.	"Allan" (extended mix)	7:57
2.	"Psychiatric" (new beat version)	5:01
3.	"Allan" (live version)	5:14

- CD maxi

No.	Title	Length
1.	"Allan" (extended mix)	7:57
2.	"Allan" (live version)	5:14
3.	"Psychiatric" (new beat version)	5:01

- Digital download

No.	Title	Length
1.	"Allan" (Ainsi soit je... version)	4:46
2.	"Allan" (1989 live version)	6:50
3.	"Allan" (extended mix)	7:57

== Release history ==
Date	Label	Region	Format	Catalog
December 1989	Polydor	France	7" single	873432-7
December 1989	Polydor	France	7" maxi	873433-1
December 1989	Polydor	France	CD maxi	873433-2

== Official versions ==
Version	Length	Album	Remixed by	Year	Comment
"Allan"
Album version	4:46	Ainsi soit je...	—	1988	See the previous sections
Extended mix	7:57	Dance Remixes	Laurent Boutonnat	1990	Devoted to discothèques, this version includes a new orchestration with a fast tempo and more refrains.
Live version (recorded in 1989)	6:50	En Concert	—	1990	Farmer sings the song after a one-minute introduction performed by Carole Fredericks.
Live single version	4:50	—	Laurent Boutonnat	1989	This version does not include the introduction and deletes one refrain.
Live maxi version	5:15	—	Laurent Boutonnat	1989	Unlike the live version on the album, this version does not include the introduction sung by Carole Fredericks.
Music video	5:42	Les Clips Vol. III, Music Videos I	—	1989	
"Psychiatric"
7" version	4:00	—	Laurent Boutonnat	1989	See the previous sections
New beat remix	5:01	—	Laurent Boutonnat	1989	This version has more refrains and music.
Album version	6:08	L'autre...	—	1991	This version has more music.

== Credits and personnel ==
These are the credits and the personnel as they appear on the back of the single:

- Mylène Farmer – lyrics
- Laurent Boutonnat – music
- Bertrand Le Page and Toutankhamon – editions
- Polydor – recording company
- Marianne Rosentiehl – photo

== Charts and sales ==
=== Weekly charts ===
Chart (1990)	Peak position
Europe (Eurochart Hot 100 Singles)	99
France (SNEP)	32

=== Sales ===
Sales for "Allan"
Region	Certification	Certified units/sales
France	—	80,000
