= Tristana (song) =

Single by Mylène Farmer

from the album Cendres de Lune
- Released: February 1987
- Recorded: 1987, France
- Genre: Synthpop
- Length: 4:30
- Label: Polydor
- Songwriters: Lyrics: Mylène Farmer; Music: Laurent Boutonnat
- Producer: Laurent Boutonnat

Mylène Farmer singles chronology
"Libertine" (1986)	"Tristana" (1987)	"Sans contrefaçon" (1987)

Alternate covers
- 12" maxi

Alternative cover
- Soundtrack of the music video

"Tristana" is a 1987 song recorded by the French artist Mylène Farmer. Fourth single from her first studio album Cendres de Lune, the song was released in February 1987. As for the previous single "Libertine", the music video was produced as a film, with many extras and a huge budget. The second single in Farmer's career with lyrics entirely written by the singer herself, it enjoyed an intense promotion on television and met a great success in France, reaching the top ten.

== Background and writing ==
After the success of "Libertine", the duo Farmer-Boutonnat sought to repeat their musical feat. In January 1987, Farmer performed "Au bout de la nuit" during a television show dedicated to Guy Béart, which indicated that the song was scheduled as her fifth single. However, Boutonnat had composed a new music and had asked Farmer to write lyrics that could be sung with this music (in fact, from this song, Farmer wrote all lyrics of her songs). It was Thierry Rogen who mixed the song. Although many media said that Farmer draw her inspiration from Luis Buñuel's film Tristana, with Catherine Deneuve, which tells the story of a mutilated woman, it was wrong, as Farmer actually referred to Leo Tolstoy's novel Anna Karenina. Indeed, Farmer stated she had not seen the film before the song's writing, saying: "It's true that Tristana is a Spanish name, and I when I thought Tristana, I thought Russian."

Finally, this song was released instead of "Au bout de la nuit" as this song was deemed as too slow. Because of this hit, the album Cendres de Lune had a great success and was more released in CD edition in 1987; "Tristana" was added to the track listing in its both studio and remix versions.

== Lyrics and music ==
The song deals with Farmer's favorite themes which has been regularly used in her next songs: blood and death. According to L'Est Républicain, "the fragility released by the texts can be found in the establishment of the instruments. For the occasion, flute, keyboards, percussion were treated in the manner of drum machines". About music, Farmer said: "We tried to give a little Slavic color, an atmosphere from Ukraine, to the song. Of course, the pan flute, it's not really Russian, but it contributes to this climate. And it's also a little oriental".

== Music video ==
=== Production ===
The video, directed by Laurent Boutonnat, was shot for five days in April 1987 in La Chapelle-en-Vercors, France. This Polydor production cost about 450,000 francs (70,000 euros) and lasts 11:30, which was then the more expensive video of all time and remains the second longest one of Farmer, the first one being "Pourvu qu'elles soient douces".

The video, whose scene takes place in the snowy steppes, was inspired by the story "Snow White and the Seven Dwarfs" in a Russian version, during the revolution of October 1917, as evidenced by the archival images used throughout the video. It features Tristana (played by Farmer), Rasoukine (played by sculptor Vladimir Ivtchenko), a tsarina (played by Sophie Tellier, a dancer, who had also featured as Farmer's enemy in "Libertine"), a monk, seven dwarfs, several soldiers, horses, birds and wolves. In an interview, Farmer said it was easier for her to speak in Russian in the video as she had learned the language at school. The monk was played by Sacha Prijovic. The actor who portrayed the peasant was very tense during the shooting and drank vodka before the scene in which he kissed.

Sophie Tellier actively took part in the recruitment and rehearsal of the dancers featuring in the video, and confessed to being quite surprised by the power of the special effects used when she saw the video for the first time. Initially, the furniture of the dwarfs' house was not designed on the right scale, which upset the designer Emmanuel Sorin and made Farmer laugh. Dangerous wolves used in the video were actually disguised huskies, which belonged to Christian and Gaétan, Boutonnat's friends, who owned a farm in Normandy.

=== Reception and influence ===
According to the biographer Bernard Violet as well as to journalist Caroline Bee, the video could contain a political message throughout the metaphorical transposition of the revolution of October 1917, and every character would represent a category of people or ideas; the scene in which Tristana is falling on a snowy slope refers to the fall of a cradle in the stairs in the 1925 silent film The Battleship Potemkin. The video, in its production as well as in its theme, is a real tribute to the revolutionary Soviet Russian film director and film theorist Sergei Eisenstein. According to psychologist Hugues Royer, the video, as it is inspired by "Snow White and the Seven Dwarfs", reproduces the Oedipus complex described by Freud. It is dedicated to Max Gautier, Farmer's father, who died a few months earlier.

The video was often praised, even presented as an event in the media. and eventually broadcast for the first time on 6 May 1987 at Cinéma Normandie on the Champs-Élysées. Violet described the video as an "aesthetic" feature film, with a "fast and sophisticated editing" and "an obvious concern for composition". However, given its unusual length, television channels were reluctant to broadcast it, and thereby Boutonnat decided to release a video album entitled Les Clips that contained the first four videos of Farmer.

== Critical reception ==
The song was generally very well received by the press at the time. For example, Cool stated the song "reveals the original universe of Farmer: mystery, hushed atmosphere, sweet voice". To Foto Musique, "the music superbly refined prevents despair to settle". Rock Musique considered that this song has an "undeniable charm" and Télé Loisirs praised the song for it "aestheticism". Pilote said that with this song, Farmer "pulls through better and better", and Paroles deemed that "the climate of malicious strangeness is undeniable (...), her naughty and indecent songs practice their seduction". Author Erwan Chuberre considered "Tristana" as the "worthy successor of "Libertine", a new lushly romantic hit".

In France, the single debuted at number 33 on the SNEP chart. It gained a few places every week until reaching a peak of number seven on 13 June. The song managed to stay for twelve weeks in the top 20 and 21 weeks on the chart, from 25 April to 12 September 1987. Like Farmer's previous single "Libertine", "Tristana" was certified Silver disc by SNEP in 1987 for a minimum of 250,000 copies sold, thus becoming one of the ten biggest hits of the singer. In December 2017, the song was released as a maxi vinyl and re-entered the chart at number 18, staying for three weeks in the top 200.

== Promotion and live performances ==
In 1987, Farmer appeared on many French channels such as TF1, Antenne 2, FR3, Canal + and France 5 to promote the song. She then performed "Tristana" in a total of 26 television shows from 19 February to 15 December in which she was sometimes interviewed before or after her performance. On certain shows, she also sang "Au Bout de la nuit", "La Ronde triste" and "Sans contrefaçon". At each performance, Farmer wore a special costume and, for the first time, she performed a choreography with dancers. She always sang "Tristana" in lip sync, except in the show La Nouvelle Affiche on 1 April 1987, but there were a few problems with the sound during this performance and Farmer had difficulty to sing in high notes. Because of this, Farmer has not sung in live until 2003.

"Tristana" was sung on stage during the 1989 tour. Then Farmer wore a red coat-dress, red boots and leather gloves, the female dancers were dressed as Russian farmers and the male dancers as Soviet soldiers. The choreography was based on the video: first performed by all the dancers, then by Farmer and two soldiers. After the performance, the singer left the stage being hugged by two dancers.

Farmer sang the song again during the Nevermore Tour concerts in 2023.

== Formats and track listings ==
These are the formats and track listings of single releases of "Tristana":

- 7" single - France

No.	Title	Length
1.	"Tristana"	4:30
2.	"Au bout de la nuit"	4:18

- 12" maxi - France

No.	Title	Length
1.	"Tristana" (remix club)	6:30
2.	"Tristana" (wolf mix)	4:30
3.	"Au bout de la nuit"	4:18

- 12" maxi - Soundtrack - France / 12" maxi - Soundtrack - Promo - France

No.	Title	Length
1.	"Overture"	2:15
2.	"Tristana" (single version)	4:30
3.	"Adieu Tristana"	4:00
4.	"Full sound tape"	11:25

- Cassette - France

No.	Title	Length
1.	"Tristana" (remix club)	7:10
2.	"Overture"	2:15
3.	"Adieu Tristana"	4:00
4.	"Tristana" (single version)	4:30

- 7" single - Without cover - Canada

No.	Title	Length
1.	"Tristana"	4:30
2.	"Maman a tort"	4:08

- Digital download

No.	Title	Length
1.	"Tristana" (Cendres de Lune version)	4:30
2.	"Tristana" (remix club)	7:10
3.	"Tristana" (1989 live version)	8:00

== Release history ==
Date	Label	Region	Format	Catalog
February 1987	Polydor	France	7" single	885 572-7
February 1987	Polydor	France	12" maxi - Remixes	885 572-1
February 1987	Polydor	France	12" maxi - Soundtrack	885 926-1
February 1987	Polydor	France	Cassette	885 973-4
February 1987	Polydor	France	12" maxi - Soundtrack - Promo	885 931-1
February 1987	Polydor	Canada	7" single	F4 87199

== Official versions ==
Version	Length	Album	Remixed by	Year	Comment
Album version	4:35	Cendres de Lune	—	1987	See the previous sections
Single / Album version	4:30	Les Mots	Laurent Boutonnat	1987	The version is identical to the album version, but slightly shorter.
Remix club	7:10	Cendres de Lune, Dance Remixes	Laurent Boutonnat	1987	This dance remix uses a lot of drum machines and many echoes.
Remix club (12" maxi version)	6:30	—	Laurent Boutonnat	1987	This version is similar to the 'Remix club', but the musical bridge is shorter.
Wolf mix	4:30	—	Laurent Boutonnat	1987	This is an instrumental version in which Farmer performs vocals throughout the song and sings almost a cappella one refrain at the end of this version.
Music video	11:25	Les Clips, Music Videos I	—	1987	Uses the Remix club
Live version (recorded in 1989)	8:00	En Concert	Laurent Boutonnat	1989	This live version has a long musical introduction, in which some cries of wolves and the breath of an icy wind can be heard.

== Credits and personnel ==
These are the credits and the personnel as they appear on the back of the single:

- Mylène Farmer – lyrics
- Laurent Boutonnat – music
- Bertrand Le Page and Toutankhamon – editions
- Polydor – recording company
- Christophe Mourthé – photo
- Philippe Huart / Pearl Cholley – design
- André Perriat / Top Master (12" maxi) – mastering, engraving

== Charts and certifications ==
Weekly chart performance for "Tristana"
Chart (1987)	Peak position
Europe (European Hot 100 Singles)	50
French SNEP Singles Chart	7
Quebec (ADISQ)	17
Chart (2017)	Peak position
French SNEP Singles Chart	18

=== Year-end charts ===
1987 year-end chart performance for "Tristana"
Chart (1987)	Position
European Top 100 Singles (Music & Media)	95

=== Certifications ===
Region	Certification	Certified units/sales
France (SNEP)	Silver	300,000
