= Maman a tort =

Single by Mylène Farmer

from the album Cendres de Lune
- B-side: "Instrumental"
- Released: March 1984
- Recorded: 1984, France
- Genre: New wave, synthpop
- Length: 3:35 (single version); 4:05 (album version); 3:50 (English version)
- Label: RCA
- Composers: Jérôme Dahan and Laurent Boutonnat
- Lyricist: Jérôme Dahan
- Producers: Laurent Boutonnat; F. R. David (English version)

Mylène Farmer singles chronology
| "Maman a tort" (1984) | "On est tous des imbéciles" (1985) |

"Maman a tort" is a 1984 song recorded by French artist Mylène Farmer. It was the debut single from Farmer's first studio album Cendres de Lune, and marked the beginning of her collaboration with her long-time composer, Laurent Boutonnat. With lyrics by Jérôme Dahan, who also helped compose the song with Boutonnat, the song was first released in March 1984. Initially, Boutonnat and Dahan held auditions to find a performer for the song, which ultimately led to Farmer being chosen. An English-language version, titled "My Mum Is Wrong" and produced by F. R. David, was released in September 1984.

"Maman a tort" was deemed provocative at the time of its release, as its ambiguous lyrics were accused of containing themes of lesbianism. Its accompanying music video, in which Farmer appeared lightly dressed, was also censored on television. "Maman a tort" was generally well received by critics and achieved modest success, while its English-language version was a commercial failure. "Maman a tort" helped Farmer to launch her singing career and establish her artistry, while the song attracted the attention of many gay people to her work.

== Background and writing ==
In December 1983, Jerôme Dahan and Laurent Boutonnat, two friends, composed a song called "Maman a tort", about lesbian love between a girl committed to a mental hospital and her nurse. To find a performer, they held a casting. A girl aged 15–16 was initially chosen to perform the song, before being rejected because she was too young to sing its sexually ambiguous lyrics. Boutonnat then decided to ask one of his friends, Mylène Gautier, to sing the track. Both composers have said that they thought Gautier seemed psychotic and thus was the ideal person to record the track. Boutonnat said: "As soon as I saw her, with her triangular face, I realized that this would be her and nobody else. She looked crazy, it was perfect." After they decided to work with her, Gautier took the pseudonym of Farmer, as a tribute to actress Frances Farmer.

According to Jean-Claude Déquéant, Farmer showed limited enthusiasm during the demo recordings and declared: "The voice was surprisingly present and she laughed after each take when listening". Dahan was satisfied, because Farmer had a clear and deep voice and could easily reach high notes. Initial rehearsals were held at Dahan's home. Dahan has said of these rehearsals: "There was a large room with a piano and there we repeated the staging of the song. Mylène had a hard time understanding all this, we had to teach her everything, starting with the choreography [...] This probably did not look very professional."

Recording of the French version of "Maman a tort" took place in Paris in January 1984, with Farmer stating that the sessions were a "magic" moment. Later, the English-language version of the song was recorded in an afternoon at the Dany Darras studio in Cernay. Farmer had no difficulty in singing in English because she spoke the language very well, having lived in Canada.

Initially Boutonnat and Dahan found it difficult to find a record company who would release the track, either because labels were worried about the song being censored due to the sexual nature of its lyrics or because they did not see any commercial potential in the track. In order to get a second appointment with RCA records the pair claimed they had remixed the song, even though they had not. Only after a third appointment with RCA did the label's Francis Dacla give them a contract.

According to France Dimanche, the song saved Farmer from entering into a loveless marriage. Farmer had become disillusioned with showbusiness after struggling to get even tiny roles in commercials and had resolved to wed a childhood friend, a student of the École nationale d'administration, before she was selected to sing "Maman a tort".

== Release ==
The single was first released in France in March 1984, but was not commercially successful. Several months later, it gained more success under the management of Bertrand Le Page, a famous artistic director. The song was heavily played on French radio. In view of the song's success, Frédérick Leibovitz suggested that Farmer record an English-language version of the single named "My Mum Is Wrong", in an effort to win over a wider audience. This version was produced by F. R. David who also translated the lyrics, being motivated by affection for Le Page. The song was released in September in France and Canada. The English version was released in Germany, Italy and Scandinavia and was scheduled to be released in England and the United States. Extended versions of "Maman a tort" and "My Mum Is Wrong" were produced by Laurent Boutonnat and issued as 7" maxi singles.

There were two covers for "Maman a tort": the first release was produced in black and white and shows Farmer looking sad and wearing a nightgown, the second release, in colour, shows her laughing. The second cover was based on an idea by Bertrand Le Page who thought that it would be better to give the public an image it wanted. The single's Canadian release did not have a cover. A different cover was used for "My Mum Is Wrong"'s vinyl, with the image used being similar to the second French release of "Maman a tort". The B-side of the song was an instrumental version of the track, as Farmer's musical team had no budget to record another song. In 2003, a remix version was produced by DJ Joaquim Garraud for the compilation album RemixeS but was not released.

== Lyrics and music ==
The song is constructed like a nursery rhyme in which a young girl, while numbering facts between 1 and 8, confesses her love for a female nurse. As written on the cover, the song is dedicated to the actress Frances Farmer, as well as King Ludwig II of Bavaria. Farmer explained at the time that the song was not autobiographical.

"Maman a tort" lays the foundation of Farmer's musical universe, including many themes dealt with by Farmer in subsequent releases. Among the topics discussed are transgression, love, the world of childhood, violence and death, mortality and suffering, sexuality, and social demands. The song also deals with psychoanalysis. The rhythm is catchy, and the lyrics, "dark and symbolic", describe the conflicts between a daughter and her mother, as the title suggests. According to an analysis published by Sophie Khairallah, the lyrics could also refer to incest. They seem to be "innocent" and are sung "in the most ingenuous way". Biographer Bernard Violet considers the song "a nursery rhyme with enigmatic but quite spicy lyrics which place it rather far from contemporary Sabine Paturel and her innocent song "Les Bêtises"". Journalist Caroline Bee deemed the song as "a small efficient UFO, with a catchy and binary melody and a disconcerting video".

In a 1984 interview Farmer discussed the song's lyrics, stating: "It can happen to many children who are in hospital [...] the nurses feed these children, tuck them into bed, kiss them before they sleep and therefore take the place of their mothers. So it is a little girl who tells her mother: I love the nurse". She said in another interview: "But if people prefer to give this song a perverse sense, it is their problem". Thus, she does not confirm the lesbian allusions that seem to emerge from the chorus (the French verb "aimer" can mean either "to love" or "to like"). However, the song has been listed in several books dealing with homosexuality and explains the fact that many gay people were immediately attracted to Farmer's work.

== Music video ==
=== Production and plot ===
Mylène Farmer wearing her nightgown. This scene, deemed as provocative, was censored on television.

The music video was directed by Laurent Boutonnat who also wrote the screenplay. Produced by RCA, it was shot in one day and cost about 5,000 francs (750–760 euro). Boutonnat wanted the video to be filmed in cinemascope, but this was unusual at the time and the idea was withdrawn.

The video begins with a portrait of Sigmund Freud in close-up, then shows a picture of Farmer's mother. The song's lyrics are subtitled. Still images of Farmer are then shown in silhouette wearing a white and transparent nightgown. With each line of the song, an image of Farmer appears. When the chorus begins, Farmer turns blue and begins to dance in front of a backdrop featuring stars and the moon. Three children are shown looking at Farmer. After another verse, which again features still images of Farmer, shots of Farmer jumping are intercut with shots of her singing along with the track with her arms clutched to her breast. Afterwards Farmer and the three children are shown holding placards with the words "Maman a tort". Following another verse Farmer's severed head is pictured on a plate on a table in front of the children who are holding knives and forks. Farmer is again shown in blue and cries before being slapped in the face. A low-angle shot of Farmer shows her readjusting the strap of her nightgown and is intercut with images of her in silhouette. The video ends with a portrait of Freud.

Boutonnat originally planned a more elaborate concept for the video. Farmer would have been shown in a wheelchair pushed by a nurse, who she had feelings for. As Farmer cannot understand this relationship, and faces the disapproval of her mother because of it, Farmer decides to commit suicide by throwing herself from the top of a cliff. The story board was also presented in the media, but Farmer's recording company RCA did not agree with to the project, especially since this video would have cost 70,000 euro to make. There was no video for "My Mum Is Wrong".

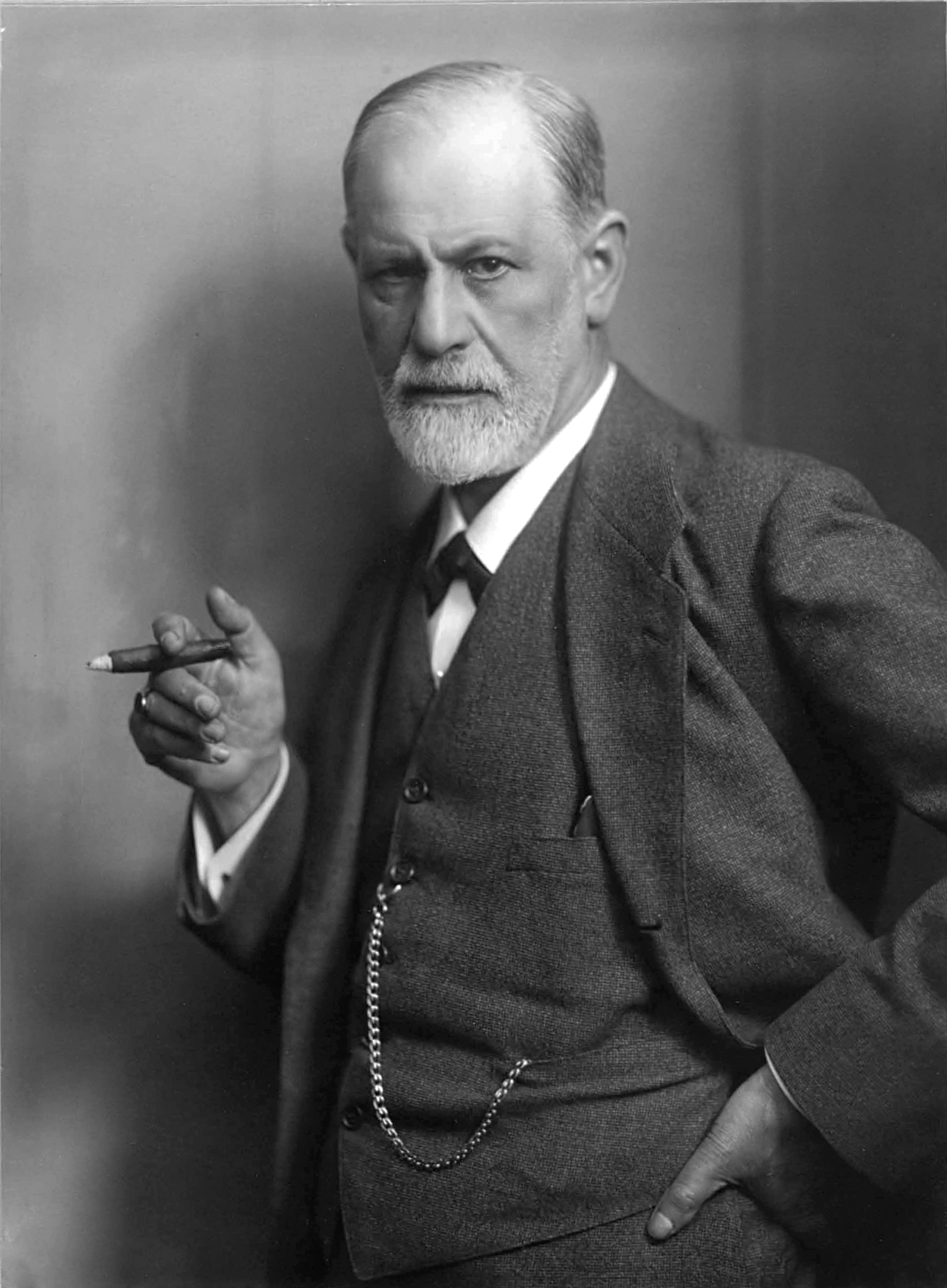
Austrian psychoanalyst Sigmund Freud features in the music video for "Maman a tort".

=== Reviews ===
The video caused "a veritable stir in the music world" because "Boutonnat cast [Farmer] as a kind of provocative Lolita figure". As she wears a transparent nightgown in the music video, some French television channels censored it. It was first aired on the French television programme Clip Clap in a shortened version. In an interview, Farmer deplored the censorship, saying: "[it] has shocked many people. I find it pretty stupid. Jacques Dutronc said "Merde in France" and everyone went into raptures. As for me, I simply say that I enjoyed the controversy".

Despite the low cost of the video, it was described in the press as "beautiful" by Chanson and "one of the best music videos of the year" by Télé Star. In contrast, the French newspaper Le Provençal called the video "useless: static, unimaginative" and claimed that it was low-budget. For his part, Violet described the video as being "half way between fotonovela and shadow play" and said that it provides "a blend of ethereal and childish sensuality, of measured provocation and of obsessive victimization".

== Critical reception ==
The song was generally very well received by the press at the time. Boys and Girls considered it "undoubtedly one of the hits of the summer of 1984", OK called it "a very promising first 7"", and Chanson 84 stated that it was "great: rhythmic, spicy, original; the orchestration, based on a synth and drums, is enriched over the couplets". Le Matin de Paris said it was "a funny perverse little song", and Les Grands de la Variété stated: "The tone is original, the music is subtle: it's a good surprise".

"Maman a tort" did not appear in the French Top 50 Singles Chart because the chart had not been created at the time. The sales of the single were about 100,000 (220,000, according to French magazine Elle), which was deemed as a "decent performance" and a "first success, not a triumphant one". "My Mum Is Wrong" was not successful and its sales are unknown. In March 2014 "Maman a Tort" entered the French Singles Chart at number 104 due to digital downloads by Farmer's fans as a tribute to her thirty-year singing career.

== Promotion and live performances ==
Bertrand Le Page provided many opportunities for Farmer to perform the song on television. French host Michel Drucker was the first to allow Farmer to perform on his show, Champs Élysées. From that moment, the song was widely played on radio and aroused the curiosity of the public.

Throughout 1984, Farmer actively promoted "Maman a tort" and performed it in on many French television programs broadcast on TF1, Antenne 2, FR3 and TMC. From February 1985 to December 1986, when her next three singles — "On est tous des imbéciles", "Plus grandir" and "Libertine" — were released, Farmer promoted them on many television shows, but she also sang "Maman a tort" on these occasions. In total, the song has been performed over twenty times on television. Her performance on Salut les Mickey was censored because of the song's ambiguous lyrics. According to author Erwan Chuberre, Farmer's performances on television were generally deemed as unconvincing, because she had never taken dance lessons at the time, and her colored dresses were not very tasteful. In spite of these performances, Farmer had difficulty achieving notoriety and, on an advice of Le Page, she extended the promotion of the song to include interviews in magazines for teenagers.

The song was included in the set list of Farmer's 1989 tour and was performed as a duet. Carole Fredericks, one of Farmer's vocalists, portrayed the nurse, and in a long monologue, she complained about one of her female patients, who was difficult to bear. Farmer, hidden beneath Frederick's long dress, suddenly appeared, wearing pyjamas, and performed the song by waddling like a little child. The song was also performed during the Mylenium Tour but included in a medley composed of her 1980s greatest hits. A snippet of the song was performed on the opening night of the Timeless Tour on 7 September 2013 in Paris. As for "My Mum Is Wrong", it does not appear on any of Farmer's albums and has not been performed on stage.

== Cover versions ==
The song has been notably covered first by French singer Lio for a 1984 hits compilation, then in 2003 by Yohann and Gabrielle, two contestants of À la Recherche de la Nouvelle Star, on the album 1ers Tubes on which it appears as 13th track; then by MF2003, whose version, released in the United Kingdom as a 7" maxi single, included an instrumental version named "My Mum Is Dub" as a B-side, but was unsuccessful and failed to chart.

== Formats and track listings ==
These are the formats and track listings of single releases of "Maman a tort" and "My Mum Is Wrong":

"Maman a tort"

- 7" single – First and second releases

| No. | Title | Length |
|---|---|---|
| 1. | "Maman a tort" (single version) | 3:35 |
| 2. | "Maman a tort" (instrumental) | 3:30 |

- 7" maxi

| No. | Title | Length |
|---|---|---|
| 1. | "Maman a tort" (long version) | 6:12 |
| 2. | "Maman a tort" (instrumental) | 3:30 |

- Digital download (since 2005)

| No. | Title | Length |
|---|---|---|
| 1. | "Maman a tort" (Cendres de Lune version) | 4:08 |
| 2. | "Maman a tort" (Les Mots version) | 6:00 |
| 3. | "Maman a tort" (1989 live version) | 6:12 |

"My Mum Is Wrong"

- 7" single

| No. | Title | Length |
|---|---|---|
| 1. | "My Mum Is Wrong" (single version) | 3:47 |
| 2. | "Maman a tort" (single version) | 3:35 |

- 7" maxi – Promo

| No. | Title | Length |
|---|---|---|
| 1. | "My Mum Is Wrong" (long version) | 6:55 |
| 2. | "Maman a tort" (long version) | 6:12 |

== Official versions ==
| Version | Length | Album | Remixed by | Year | Comment |
"Maman a tort"
| Single version | 3:35 | — | — | 1984 | See the previous sections |
| Long version | 6:12 | Les Mots | Jérôme Dahan | 1984 | There are more refrains and it ends with a long instrumental. |
| Instrumental version | 3:30 | — | Jérôme Dahan | 1984 | This instrumental version is shorter than the album version as it omits the second chorus. |
| Music video | 3:50 | Les Clips, Music Videos I (as bonus) | — | 1984 | The version used for the video is the single version. |
| Album version | 4:04 | Cendres de Lune | — | 1986 | This remastered version is based on the long version, but is shorter. |
| Live version (recorded in 1989) | 6:20 | En Concert | — | 1989 | This is a live hip-hop version recorded as a duet with French vocalist Carole Fredericks who started the song with a long monologue, saying that "she gave spankings to Farmer because the latter didn't speak much at all". |
| Live version (recorded in 2000) | 0:38 | Mylenium Tour | — | 2000 | The song was performed in a medley "Pourvu qu'elles soient douces" / "Maman a tort" / "Libertine" / "Sans contrefaçon". Farmer repeated the first verse twice. |
"My Mum Is Wrong"
| Single version | 3:50 | — | — | 1984 | See the previous sections |
| Long version | 6:45 | — | Jérôme Dahan | 1984 | This version contains additional lyrics and refrains. Farmer sometimes sings a cappella. |

== Credits and personnel ==
These are the credits and the personnel as they appear on the back of the single:

- Jérôme Dahan – lyrics, music
- Laurent Boutonnat – music
- Jean-Claude Déquéant – recording, at "Le matin calme" studio
- Philippe Omnès – mixing, at Davout studio
- Bertrand Le Page – editions
- RCA – recording company
- John Frost – photo

== Release history ==
| Date | Label | Region | Format | Catalog |
|---|---|---|---|---|
| March 1984 | RCA | France | 7" single (first cover) | 61298 |
| September 1984 | RCA | France | 7" single (second cover) | 61298 |
| September 1984 | RCA | France | 7" maxi | 61299 |
| September 1984 | RCA | France | 7" single (English version) | 61531 |
| 1985 | Original | Canada | 7" single | 6502 |
