= En concert (Mylène Farmer album) =

Live album by Mylène Farmer
- Released: 4 December 1989
- Recorded: 20 and 21 October 1989 in Brussels
- Genre: Synthpop, darkwave, baroque pop
- Length: 109:39
- Label: Polydor
- Producer: Laurent Boutonnat

Mylène Farmer chronology
Ainsi soit je... (1988)	En concert (1989)	L'autre... (1991)

Singles from En concert
- 1. "Allan" Released: December 1989; 2. "Plus grandir" Released: 12 May 1990

En concert is the first live album by Mylène Farmer, released on 4 December 1989. It retraces her two first albums, Cendres de lune and Ainsi soit je... and contains a cover, "Je voudrais tant que tu comprennes", originally sung by Marie Laforêt.

== Background ==
From May 1989, Farmer began a series of concerts through all France, which was successful. After these performances, a live album, mixed by Thierry Rogen, was eventually recorded on 20 and 21 October 1989 in Brussels. The photos, made by Marianne Rosenstiehl, illustrate the booklet with images from various shows of the singer on stage. The album was released on 4 December 1989. It was the last album edited by Bertrand Le Page for Mylène Farmer, because he was later dismissed.

A video of the concert, released in May 1990, was directed by Laurent Boutonnat who added to the concert some rather morbid sequences, such as satanic monks and cemeteries, giving thus to the video the look of a film. The editing was produced over a period of one year and was criticized, because certain scenes were re-filmed without the audience.

Two singles were released to promote En concert - what was rather rare at the time for a live album: "Allan" and "Plus grandir", which had a minor success, but were much aired in nightclubs. The album also contains the live version of a song which didn't appear then on Farmer's albums, "À quoi je sers...", and a cover version of Marie Laforêt's song, "Je voudrais tant que tu comprennes".

== Critical reception ==
Professional ratings
Review scores
Source	Rating
AllMusic	3/5 stars

En concert was generally well received in media. For example, The Mag stated that this album is "a beautiful technical and musical performance". TV Hebdo considered that this album is "loan of emotion". La Voix du Nord qualified it as "real present", containing "the most successful songs" of Farmer, with a "very class presentation" and a booklet of photos. As for France Soir, it said that it is a very "beautiful object". However, according to French journalist Caroline Bee, "the production, a little bit smooth, does not pass on completely the emotion and the strength which emanated from the blazing show".

== Commercial performance ==
The album debuted at number 18 on 3 January 1990, on the French Album Chart. It was then number 15, then number nine, which was its peak position. It remained in the top ten for two months and in the top 20 for seven months. It fell off the top 40 after ten months. and was certified Double Gold album by the SNEP for 200,000 units sold. On 18 March 2005, the album, then released in a digipack version, re-entered the chart for four weeks, peaking at number 106.

== Track listing ==
=== French version ===
All lyrics are written by Mylène Farmer except where noted; all music is composed by Laurent Boutonnat except where noted.

Disc one
No.	Title	Lyrics	Music	Original album	Length
1.	"Prologue"			-	5:50
2.	"L'Horloge"	Charles Baudelaire		Ainsi soit je...	4:47
3.	"Plus grandir"			Cendres de lune	4:50
4.	"Sans logique"			Ainsi soit je...	5:06
5.	"Maman a tort"	Jérôme Dahan	Boutonnat; Jérôme Dahan	Cendres de lune	6:20
6.	"Déshabillez-moi"	Gaby Verlor	Robert Nyel	Ainsi soit je...	3:56
7.	"Puisque..."			-	8:15
8.	"Pourvu qu'elles soient douces"			Ainsi soit je...	8:58
9.	"Allan"			Ainsi soit je...	6:50

Disc two
No.	Title	Lyrics	Music	Original album	Length
1.	"À quoi je sers..."			-	5:05
2.	"Sans contrefaçon"			Ainsi soit je...	6:10
3.	"Jardin de Vienne"			Ainsi soit je...	6:00
4.	"Tristana"			Cendres de lune	8:12
5.	"Ainsi soit je..."			Ainsi soit je...	7:49
6.	"Libertine"	Boutonnat	Jean-Claude Dequéant	Cendres de lune	12:07
7.	"Mouvements de Lune (Part 1)"			-	4:09
8.	"Je voudrais tant que tu comprennes"	Georges Pirault	Francis Lai	-	4:03
9.	"Mouvements de Lune (Part 2)"			-	5:11

=== VHS ===
1. "Prologue" (6:00)
2. "L'Horloge" (4:30)
3. "Sans logique" (5:00)
4. "Maman a tort" (6:00)
5. "Déshabillez-moi" (3:45)
6. "Puisque..." (5:00)
7. "Pourvu qu'elles soient douces" (8:00)
8. "À quoi je sers..." (5:00)
9. "Sans contrefaçon" (6:00)
10. "Jardin de Vienne" (5:30)
11. "Tristana" (8:00)
12. "Ainsi soit je..." (7:40)
13. "Libertine" (12:00)
14. "Je voudrais tant que tu comprennes" (4:00)
15. "Mouvements de Lune" (5:00)

Note

- Does not contain "Plus grandir and "Allan" (they are added on Les Clips Vol. III).

== Personnel ==
- Musicians:
  - Keyboards: Bruno Fontaine
  - Drums: Yves Sanna
  - Percussion: Philippe Drai
  - Guitars: Slim Pezin
  - Bass: Christian Podovan
  - Cello: Jean-Philippe Audin
- Background vocals: Carole Fredericks, Beckie Bell
- Sound: Thierry Rogen
- Mixed by Thierry Rogen
- Mastering and engraving: André Perriat / Top Master
- Photos: Marianne Rosenstiehl / Sygma
- Design: Jean-Paul Théodule
- Editions:
  - Requiem Publishing: "Prologue"
  - Bertrand Le Page / Polygram Music: "L'Horloge", "Plus grandir", "Sans logique", "Pourvu qu'elles soient douces", "Allan", "Sans contrefaçon", "Jardin de Vienne", "Tristana", "Ainsi soit je...", "Libertine"
  - Bertrand Le Page / Cézame: "Maman a tort"
  - Intersong - Paris: "Déshabillez-moi"
  - Requiem Publishing / Bertrand Le Page: "Puisque...", "À quoi je sers...", "Mouvements de lune"
  - Métropolitaines: "Je voudrais tant que tu comprennes"
- Recorded at Studio Mobile "Le Voyageur II" / Yves Jaget
- Mixed at Studio Mega
- Produced by Laurent Boutonnat

== Charts ==
=== Weekly charts ===
Chart (1990)	Peak position
Belgian Albums (Ultratop 50 Wallonia)	2
European Albums (Top 100)	46
French Albums (SNEP)	9
Chart (2005)	Peak position
Belgian Albums (Ultratop Wallonia)	48

=== Year-end charts ===
Chart (1990)	Position
French Albums (SNEP)	42

== Certifications and sales ==
Region	Certification	Certified units/sales
France (SNEP)	2× Gold	200,000^{*}
France (SNEP) dvd - blu-ray	2× Platinum	20,000^{*}
^{*} Sales figures based on certification alone.

== Formats ==
Audio

- Double 12" ^{1}
- Double CD
- Double CD (only one case)
- Cassette ^{1}

Note:^{1} Does not contain "Déshabillez-moi" and "Mouvements de lune (Part I)"

Video

- VHS
- VHS - Limited edition (+ Best of live)
- VHS - Polygram edition
- 12" Laserdisc
