= Plus grandir =

Single by Mylène Farmer

from the album Cendres de Lune
- B-side: "Chloé"
- Released: 25 September 1985
- Recorded: 1985, France
- Genre: Synthpop
- Length: 4:03
- Label: Polydor
- Songwriters: Lyrics: Mylène Farmer; Music: Laurent Boutonnat
- Producer: Laurent Boutonnat

Mylène Farmer singles chronology
"On est tous des imbéciles" (1984)	"Plus grandir" (1985)	"Libertine" (1986)
Allan (Live) (1990)	Plus grandir (1990)	Désenchantée (1991)

Alternative cover
- CD maxi of the 1990 live mix version

"Plus grandir" (English: "Not Growing Anymore") is a 1985 song recorded by French singer-songwriter Mylène Farmer and is the first song written by the singer. It was released twice: first, on 25 September 1985 in a studio version as second single from Farmer's debut album Cendres de Lune, then on 12 May 1990 in a live mix version as second single from the live album En Concert. In spite of positive critics and a music video produced as a short film in cinemascope, the song achieved moderate success in France in terms of sales and chart performances.

== Background, writing and release ==
After the relative failure of the "On est tous des imbéciles", Farmer separated from the songwriter Jerome Dahan and her contract with the record company RCA ended. She then signed with Polydor for two albums and, for the first time, she wrote the lyrics of her next single, "Plus grandir", which was released in September 1985 (it was also released in Canada, but without cover, and at the same time that "We'll Never Die", only released in this country), with "Chloé" as B-side. Despite sales fairly low, Polydor allowed the duo Mylène Farmer / Laurent Boutonnat to create the album Cendres de Lune, in March 1986.

About five years after the single's release, Farmer did not yet expect the relative success of this song, which was her first composition. She then decided to release this song for the second time, but in live version, after the success of the live album En Concert in 1990. The song's success was relative, except in nightclubs. Eventually, the song was the last collaboration at level of editing and management between Farmer and Bertrand Le Page because of artistic differences in late 1989.

The 1985 promotional 7" contained a photo of the pram used in the music video and a letter written by Farmer. Among the various formats of the live song, there was a picture disc, which is the first one in the singer's career.

== Lyrics and music ==
The song deals with subjects that Farmer was especially fond of at the time: difficulty of leaving childhood, fear of aging, permanent pain of living and death. Boutonnat said in an interview: "When listening well, we see that lyrics talk about death, childhood and the loss of virginity. In the same time, of course we can extrapolate and speak of it in different words." About lyrics, Farmer explained: "Old age traumatizes me, it's what I wanted to say in the song". French author Erwan Chuberre said ""Plus grandir" is a song that sounds like a hymn to the refusal to grow old, it is the denial of becoming an adult to avoid dying."

Boutonnat composed a rather pop music, which is quite rare for a sensitive theme.

== Music video ==
=== 1985 version ===
==== Production ====
The 1985 video, the first one shot in cinemaScope was made by Laurent Boutonnat who also wrote the screenplay. Farmer drew the storyboard of the video. This Movie Box / Laurent Boutonnat / Polydor production with a 7:32 length cost about 330,000 francs (about 50,000 euros; the most expensive videoclip of 1985) and was shot for five days: four days at Studio Sets in Stains and the other one in Saint-Denis's cemetery. Boutonnat stated: "It is a co-production with Polygram. I went to see both the president of the group, Mr Levy, and that of Polydor. Both were seduced by the script and accepted the idea of shooting." Boutonnat managed to convince advertiser Stephan Sperry to contribute in the financing of the video. Jean-Pierre Sauvaire, film editor Agnès Mouchal, costume designer Corinne Sarfati and film director Francois Hanss were part of the technical team. Max Gautier, Farmer's father, also participated in the preparation of scenery, which included among other things a pond (also used in Ainsi soit je...) and the dolls made by Farmer. Rambo Kolawski, who played the role of the rapist, has also appeared in the next video, "Libertine". The instrumental "Cendres de Lune", available on the album of the same name, can be heard at the opening credits.

Boutonnat tried to register himself with the National Center of Cinematography for the video was considered as a short film. Therefore, it was aired in the cinema in preview and was first seen in Kinopanorama cinema in Paris on 13 Novembre 1985. On television, it was broadcast for the first time on Platine 45, on Antenne 2.

==== Plot ====
In the video, we see a woman, played by Farmer, in a cemetery pushing a pram who comes to meditate at her own grave. Then, in a house full of spiders' webs, a girl on her bed, also played by Farmer, mistreats her doll throwing it in all directions and drowning it in the water. While crying, she begs the Virgin Mary to not grow and die. During her sleep, a man enters her room and rapes her, which she eventually agrees to (Farmer reveals one of her breasts). The next day, dwarfish nuns beat the girl giving kicks, then with a knife, the girl cuts the doll's limbs, turns on herself and becomes a very old woman. The video ends with the woman in the cemetery who puts a bunch on the grave and goes away.

==== Symbolism and reviews ====
About the video, Boutonnat explained that the young woman who is played by Farmer is "beset by religious fantasies mainly (...) and related primarily to the world of childhood. You know, all those little things that you are afraid when you are young. I tried to transcribe in my music video like that phosphorescent statue of animated virgin and the appearances of dwarfs".

Journalist Caroline Bee said the theme of the video refers to the "passage from childhood to adolescence with what it involves of physical, but also psychological changes, (...) and new responsibilities, and sexuality". According to an analysis published in Instant-Mag, the amputation of the doll is a "symbolism of the defilement" and is synonymous with a "childhood stolen". Writer and psychologist Hugues Royer declared that the rape is here the symbol of mourning forced of the early years. "Agreeing to become an adult goes with the acceptance of our inevitable end." Biographer Bernard Violet thinks the music video has several film references, including The Devils by Ken Russell, and Psycho by Alfred Hitchcock.

In France, the video was often censored and only broadcast in a shortened version, as it criticized religion and deals with death and sex. For example, French show Bonsoir les clips, although being aired on the night, refused the video which it considered as "too morbid". On television, the scene of the rape as well as that of the evil dwarfish nuns were removed. Despite that, the video was much aired on television in 1985 and 1986 and received positive reviews. Magazines Charlie considered the music video as very "amazing", OK as "a true little masterpiece", and Salut said it has a "tortured atmosphere". Bee stated the "video is neat and the atmosphere is murky".

=== 1990 version ===
For the live version, a video of the 1989 tour was made with new images from "Plus grandir"'s performance and choreography. The introduction was filmed at the same time as the not live images from "Allan", and shows the monk who opened the concert, in a hazy nature.

== Critical reception ==
The song was generally very well received at the time by the media. Microsillon stated: "[It is] an impeccable record from a musical point of view; the simple lyrics are a refreshing breath". Paroles deemed this song "confirms the depth of the singer" and Podium said "the result is pure, moving (...). That may be naive, but far from being stupid". According to Télé Poche, "[Farmer] launched with her sweet voice this moving prayer". For L'Evénement du jeudi, "[this song] is perverse and morbid, but it is so exciting". and for Charlie, "the disc is not bad at all". However, Paris Normandie considered that lyrics are not very audible.

The 1985 studio version did not reach the French Top 50 Singles Charts; however, in December 2017, it was released as a maxi vinyl and entered the chart at number 19, staying for three weeks in the top 200. The live single entered the chart on 19 May 1990 and stayed in the top 50 for seven weeks, peaking at number 35 on 16 June.

== Promotion and live performances ==
After the single release, Farmer promoted the song in several television shows, performing in Ile de transe (31 October 1985, FR3; she also sang "Maman a tort"), Super Platine (Antenne 2; she performed "On est tous des imbéciles" too), Tapage nocturne (27 December 1985, TF1), Hit des Clubs (January 1986, RTL), L'Académie des 9 (14 January 1986, Antenne 2), Citron Grenadine (RTBF) and Azimuts (FR3 Lorraine; she also sang "Chloé").

"Plus grandir" was sung during the 1989 concert as second song of the show. Farmer then wore black veils, a white collar and small white socks, and performed a rhythmical choreography with two female dancers who reproduce the same gestures behind her. At the end of the song, the singer said "good evening" to the audience. The song was not performed during the next four concerts, as in 1995 Farmer said the theme of the song was no longer part of her concerns.

== Formats and track listings ==
These are the formats and track listings of single releases of "Plus grandir":

=== Original version (1985) ===
- 7" single

No.	Title	Length
1.	"Plus grandir"	4:03
2.	"Chloé"	2:30

- 12" maxi

No.	Title	Length
1.	"Plus grandir" (maxi)	6:00
2.	"Chloé"	2:30

- 7" single – Promo

No.	Title	Length
1.	"Plus grandir"	4:03

=== Live mix version (1990) ===
- 7" single

No.	Title	Length
1.	"Plus grandir" (live mix)	4:10
2.	"Plus grandir" (mum's rap)	4:10

- 12" maxi / 12" maxi – Picture disc

No.	Title	Length
1.	"Plus grandir" (mother's live remix)	6:25
2.	"Plus grandir" (mum's rap)	4:10
3.	"Plus grandir" (live mix)	4:50

- CD maxi

No.	Title	Length
1.	"Plus grandir" (live mix)	4:50
2.	"Plus grandir" (mum's rap)	4:10
3.	"Plus grandir" (mother's live remix)	6:25

- 12" maxi – Promo

No.	Title	Length
1.	"Plus grandir" (live mix)	4:50
2.	"Plus grandir" (live mix)	4:50

- Digital download

No.	Title	Length
1.	"Plus grandir" (Cendres de lune version)	4:05
2.	"Plus grandir" (Le Mots version)	3:35
3.	"Plus grandir" (1989 live version)	4:50
4.	"Plus grandir" (mother's live remix)	6:26

== Release history ==
Date	Label	Region	Format	Catalog
September 1985	Polydor	France, Canada	7" single	883 428-7
September 1985	Polydor	France, Canada	12" maxi	883 428-1
September 1985	Polydor	Canada	7" single	?
May 1990	Polydor	France	12" maxi – Promo	2076
May 1990	Polydor	France	7" single	877216-7
May 1990	Polydor	France	12" maxi	877217-1
May 1990	Polydor	France	12" maxi – Picture disc	877331-1
May 1990	Polydor	France	CD maxi	877217-2

== Official versions ==
Version	Length	Album	Remixed by	Year	Comment
Album version	4:03	Cendres de Lune	—	1985	See the previous sections
Single version	4:03	—	—	1985	It is similar to the album version.
Long version	6:00	—	Laurent Boutonnat	1985	This long version, only available on the maxi vinyl, includes a longer introduction, and more chorus and music.
Music video	7:45	Les Clips, Music Videos I	—	1985	It is similar to the album version.
Live mix (recorded in 1989)	4:50	En Concert	Laurent Boutonnat	1989	This is a remix version combining the voices of Fredericks (in fact originally heard on "Maman a tort") and that of Farmer.
Mother's live remix	6:25	Dance Remixes	Laurent Boutonnat	1989	This remixed version, a disco duet with Carole Fredericks, was aired in many discothèques. The song starts with a dialogue between Fredericks and Farmer (as for the live mix, Fredericks' words are originally recorded for "Maman a tort"). English words, particularly the phrase "Who's my mother ?" that Farmer repeats throughout the song, have been added in this version.
Mum's rap	4:15	—	Laurent Boutonnat	1989	This is a rap version.
Music video	4:50	Les Clips Vol. III, Music Videos I	—	1989	It used the version recorded on stage.
Album version	3:35	Les Mots	Laurent Boutonnat	2001	This is a remixed and shortened version in which the sound seems to be more present and the voice of Farmer slower. Unlike the original version, the song finishes with a musical passage.

== Credits and personnel ==
These are the credits and the personnel as they appear on the back of the single:

- Mylène Farmer – lyrics
- Laurent Boutonnat – music, production
- Carole – demo
- Bertrand Le Page and Toutankhamon – editions
- Polydor – recording company
- J.P. Dumas Griller – photo (1985 version)
- Marianne Rosentiehl – photo (1990 version)

== Charts and sales ==
Chart (1985)	Peak position	Physical sales
French SNEP Singles Chart	-	80,000 (album version)
Chart (1990)	Peak position	Physical sales
French SNEP Singles Chart	35	60,000 – 70,000 (live mix)
Chart (2017)	Peak position	Physical sales
French SNEP Singles Chart	19	2,000
