= Cendres de lune =

Studio album by Mylène Farmer
- Released: April 1986 (first edition); April 1987 (second edition)
- Genres: Synthpop, new wave, baroque pop
- Length: 35:28 (first edition LP, Cassette); 40:04 (second edition LP, Cassette); 53:08 (all CD editions)
- Label: Polydor
- Producer: Laurent Boutonnat

Mylène Farmer chronology
Cendres de lune (1986)	Ainsi soit je... (1988)

Singles from Cendres de lune
- 1. "Maman a tort" Released: March 1984; 2. "Plus grandir" Released: 25 September 1985; 3. "We'll Never Die (Canada only)" Released: February 1986; 4. "Libertine" Released: 1 April 1986; 5. "Tristana" Released: February 1987; 6. "Au bout de la nuit" Released: 25 June 1987

Cendres de lune is the first album by the French singer/songwriter Mylène Farmer, released on 1 April 1986. The album was preceded by the hit single "Libertine". The album was rereleased in 1987, preceded by the song "Tristana". The album, which was Farmer's only one written and composed by Laurent Boutonnat, achieved success in France. Despite this success, it is considered moderate when compared with Farmer's standards and her later high-selling albums, but it helped to launch her career.

== Background ==
After the moderate success of the first four singles ("Maman a tort", "My Mum Is Wrong" [the English-language version of "Maman a tort"], "On est tous des imbéciles" and "Plus grandir"), Farmer decided to release her first album. At the time, she had signed a contract for two albums with the recording company Polydor, which reserved the right to break the contract at any time. Fortunately, in 1986, the success of "Libertine" brought Farmer her first big hit and allowed her to produce Cendres de lune.

The vinyl release of the album contained only nine tracks, including "Maman a tort", "Plus grandir" and its B-side "Chloé", plus six other songs. Polydor did not procure the copyright for "My Mum Is Wrong", "On est tous des imbéciles" and its B-side "L'Annonciation" from RCA, the label Farmer released those tracks on. However, in 1987, with the increasingly prominence of the Compact Disc, the album was reissued with a total of 12 titles: "Tristana", the 1987 hit written by Farmer, and two remixes ("Libertine" [remix special club], "Tristana" [remix club]) were added to the track listing. The second and further cassette releases comprise ten songs, including "Tristana", but missing the two remixes.

The album was also released in Canada and Germany. The cover, in black and white, was produced by Laurent Boutonnat and shows Farmer in profile, apparently sad, putting on a hat.

== Lyrics and music ==
The lyrics were written by Laurent Boutonnat who claimed to have had difficulty in composing them. However, "Plus grandir", "Tristana" and "Au Bout de la nuit" were written by Farmer herself (from "Tristana" onwards, she wrote all the lyrics of her songs), and "Maman a tort" by Jérôme Dahan. Generally, the lyrics deal with themes that would recur in Farmer's future albums, namely death, violence, suicide, sexuality, sadness and fear of aging. Therefore, the bases of the singer's universe were laid with this first album whose darkness contrasted greatly with the optimistic songs of the time.

Except for "Maman a tort" and "Libertine", the music was produced by Laurent Boutonnat who used mostly synthesizers and acoustic keyboards and was inspired by the new wave.

== Critical reception ==
Professional ratings
Review scores
Source	Rating
AllMusic	2/5 stars

Cendres de lune was generally well received by critics. It was considered as an "excellent" album (Gaipied), a "success" (Podium), "a first album rather masterly" (La Provence), "in the area of the variety, one of the most beautiful things of the moment" (Les Gran). "Full of little marvels" (Charente), it contains "hits having an wholesome impertinence" (Télé Poche) and "provides a real insight of [Farmer]'s talent"; [the singer] carries us with her crystalline voice and strange texts, out of time and out of the standards" (Le Républicain). "The songs of Mylène fill the air with an atmosphere alternately naughty and sad but very engaging" (7 à Paris). "Mylène's voice is exquisite and her accomplices made her sing little ordinary things" (La Dépêche). "[Farmer] seduces with sensitive texts, almost surreal, tenderly erotic" (Le Télégramme).

== Commercial performance ==
In France, Cendres de lune charted for the first time in April 1989, after the success of the second album, Ainsi soit je.... It peaked at number 39.

== Track listing ==
All lyrics are written by Mylène Farmer except where noted; all music is composed by Laurent Boutonnat except where noted.

Cendres de lune
No.	Title	Lyrics	Music	Live performances	Length
1.	"Libertine"	Laurent Boutonnat	Jean-Claude Dequéant	Tour 1989; Tour 1996; Mylenium Tour; Tour 2009; Nevermore 2023/2024	3:49
2.	"Au bout de la nuit"				4:21
3.	"Vieux bouc"	Boutonnat			5:38
4.	"Tristana" (2nd edition only)			Tour 1989; Nevermore 2023/2024	4:35
5.	"Chloé"	Boutonnat			2:35
6.	"Maman a tort"	Jérôme Dahan	Boutonnat; Jérôme Dahan	Tour 1989; Timeless 2013	4:04
7.	"We'll Never Die"	Boutonnat			4:15
8.	"Greta"	Boutonnat			4:48
9.	"Plus grandir"			Tour 1989	4:04
10.	"Libertine" (special club remix, 2nd edition only)	Boutonnat	Dequéant		5:53
11.	"Tristana" (club remix, 2nd edition only)				7:10
12.	"Cendres de lune"				1:47

== Personnel ==
- Produced by Laurent Boutonnat
- Recorded and mixed by Jean-Claude Déquéant, except "Tristana" (recorded by Jean-Claude Déquéant and mixed by Thierry Rogen)
- Assistants: Philippe Laffont, Laurent Lazahie
- Mastering and engraving: André Perriat
- Keyboards, synthesizers and acoustic piano: Laurent Boutonnat
- Guitars: Slim Pezin
- Saxophone: Alain Matot
- Drums: Gilles Chamard

- Background vocals: Carole Frédéricks, Estella Samantha Radji, Anne-Marie Constant, Yvonne Jones, Les Moines Fous du Tibet
- Published by Bertrand Le Page/Polygram Music, except "Maman a tort" (Bertrand Le Page Cesanie) and "Greta" (Bertrand Le Page, Movie Box Music)
- Photograph on first side and in booklet: Laurent Boutonnat, Christophe Mourthe
- Back cover photograph: Éric Caro
- Management: Bertrand Le Page
- Recorded at "Le Matin calme" studio
- Mixed at Palais des Congrès Studio

== Charts ==
=== Weekly charts ===
Chart (1986)	Peak position
French Albums (SNEP)	10
Chart (1989)	Peak position
French Albums (SNEP)	39

=== Year-end charts ===
Chart (1989)	Position
French Albums (SNEP)	98

== Releases ==
Date	Label	Country	Format	Catalog
April 1986	Polydor	France	CD	831732-2
April 1986	Polydor	France	LP	829127-1
April 1986	Polydor	France	Cassette	831732-4
April 1986	Polydor	Canada	LP	TFX8720
April 1986	Polydor	Canada	Cassette	TFX8720
April 1986	Polydor	Germany	LP	829127-2
April 1987	Polydor	France	CD	831732-2
April 1987	Polydor	France	LP	831732-1
April 1987	Polydor	France	Cassette	831732-4
1995	Polygram	France	CD	831732-2
1998	Polygram France	France	CD	831732-2
2005	Polydor	France	Digital	—
2006	Universal	France	CD - Digipack	982826-3
2013	Universal	France	LP - Picture Disc (limited edition 2000 copy)	374725-7

== Formats ==
- 12" (first version)^{1}
- 12" (second version)
- CD (first edition)^{1}
- CD (second edition)
- Cassette (first edition)^{1}
- Cassette (second edition)
- CD - Digipack (released in 2005)
- Picture Disc (released in 2013)

^{1} 9 songs, without "Tristana" and the two remixes
