= List of songs recorded by Mylène Farmer =

This is a comprehensive list of songs by Canadian singer-songwriter Mylène Farmer, in alphabetical order. It contains only songs that were officially released from 1984, whatever they were recorded in studio or live version. Songs are listed as having been released only on the first format on which they featured, whatever it was an album or a single (when they appeared as B-sides of another song). As of 2015, the singer has recorded a total of 138 songs, including two instrumentals, eight covers, eight duets, three English versions of songs previously recorded in French, five B-sides, two hidden tracks and two soundtracks.

Key
†	Indicates single release

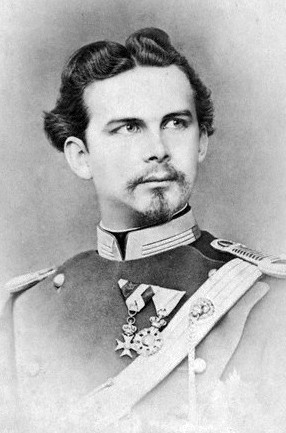
As written on the cover of Farmer's debut single, "Maman a tort", the song is dedicated to the actress Frances Farmer and to King Ludwig II of Bavaria (pictured).

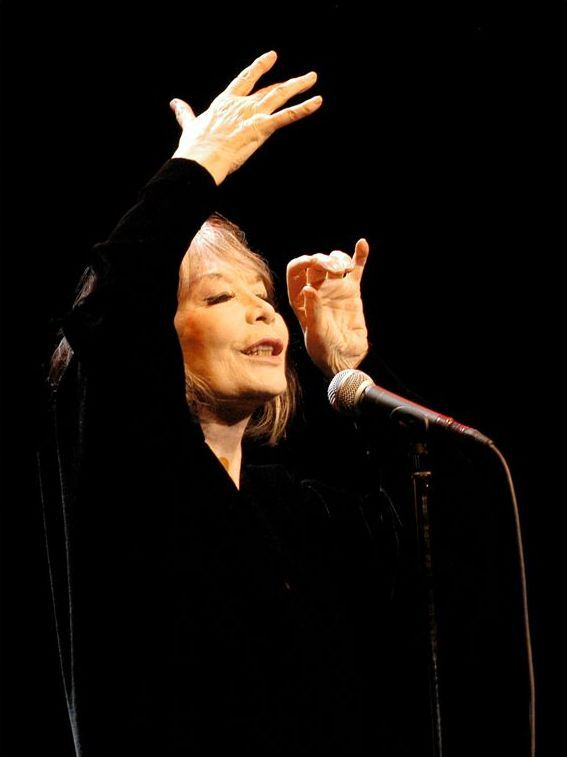
For her 1988 album Ainsi soit je..., Farmer covered "Déshabillez-moi", a song originally recorded by the French actress and singer Juliette Gréco (pictured).

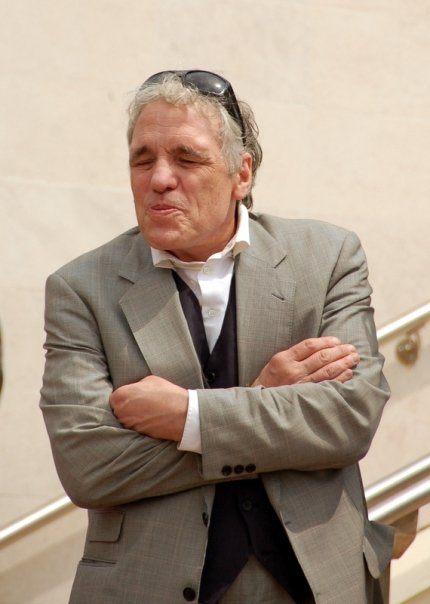
In 1996, American film screenwriter and director Abel Ferrara directed the 600,000-euro expensive music video for "California", the third single from Farmer's album Anamorphosée.

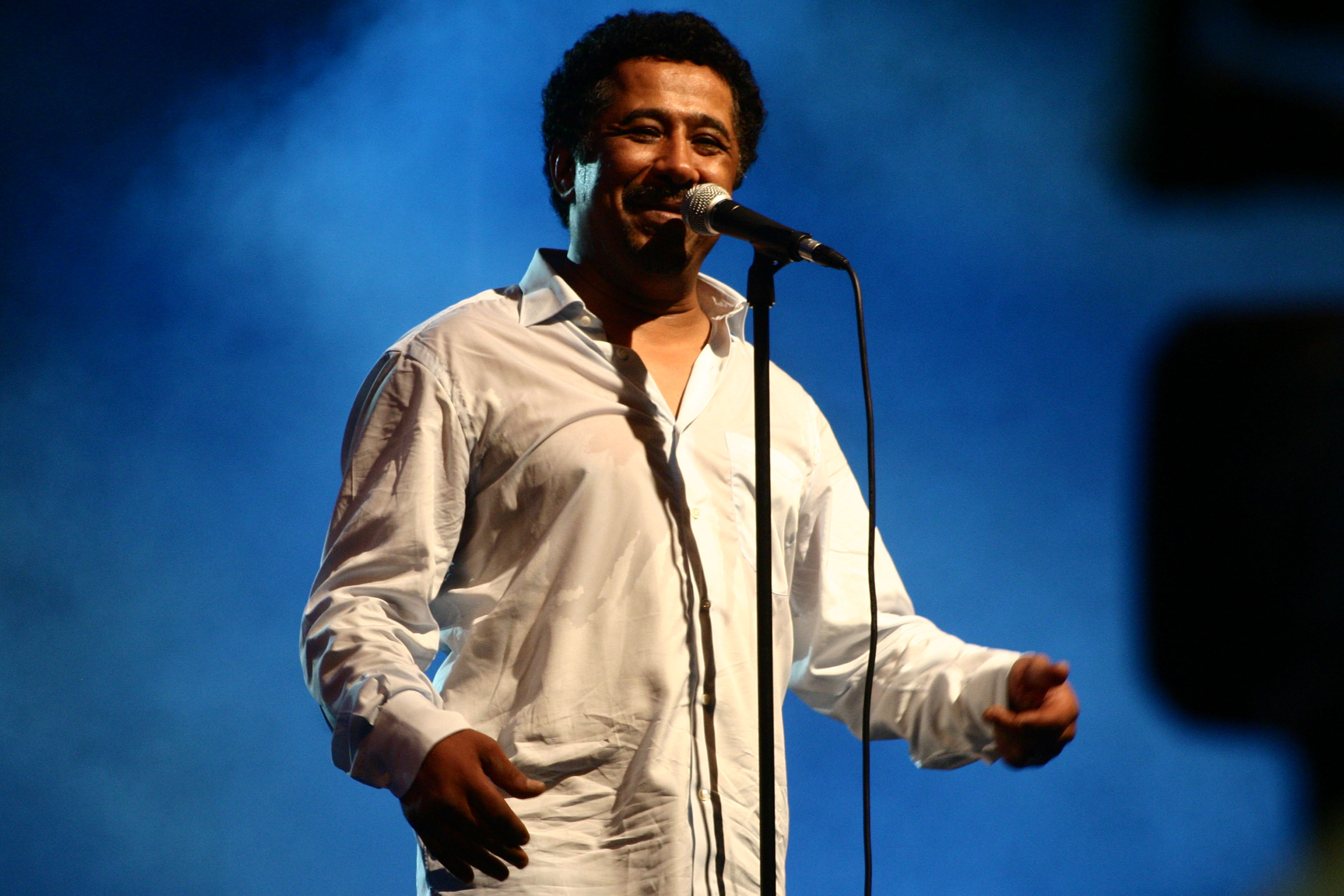
In 1996, Algerian raï singer Khaled joined Farmer on stage during her concert tour at Paris-Bercy to perform a cover of "La Poupée qui fait non", originally recorded by Michel Polnareff.

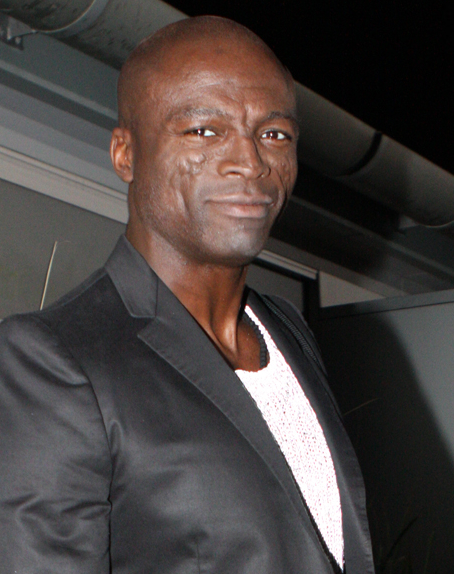
British soul and R&B singer Seal featured on the 2001 song "Les Mots".

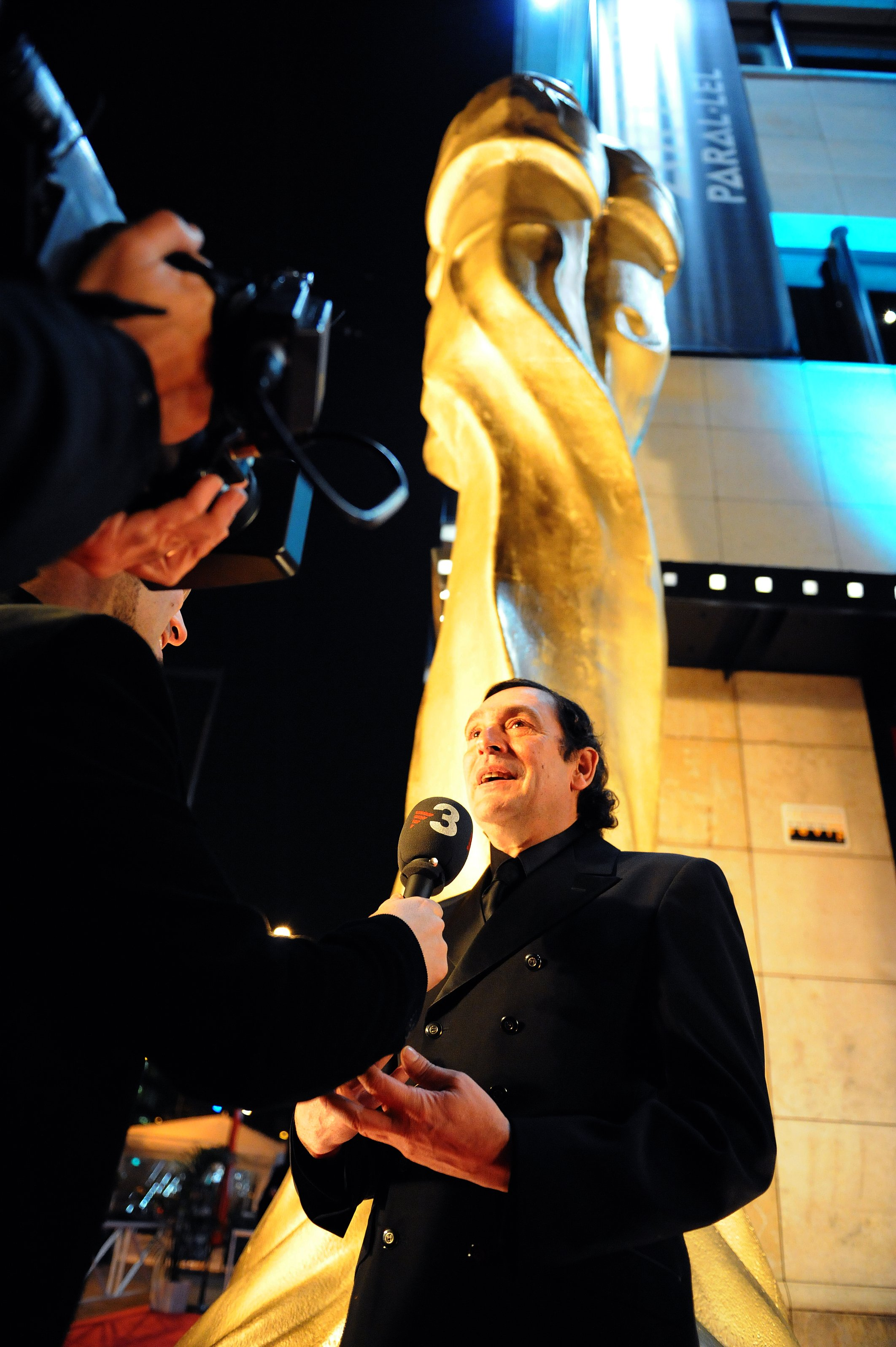
The music video for "Fuck Them All", the lead single of Farmer's album Avant que l'ombre..., was filmed by Spanish film director and screenwriter Agustí Villaronga (pictured).

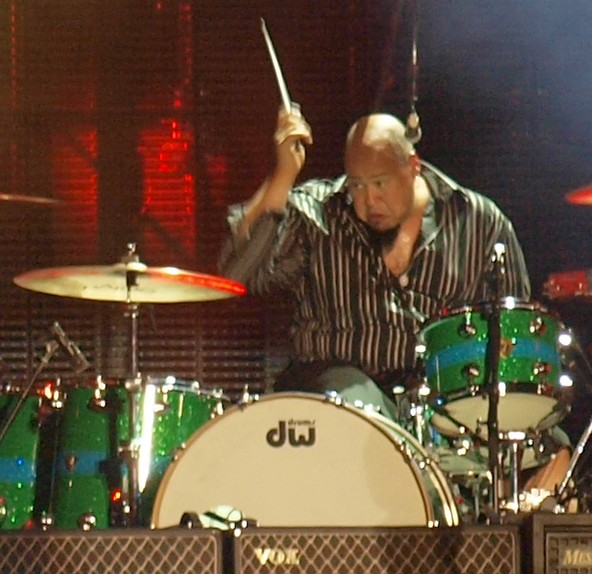
During the Avant que l'ombre... à Bercy tour, the American session drummer Abe Laboriel, Jr. replaced Seal to perform "Les Mots" on stage with Farmer.

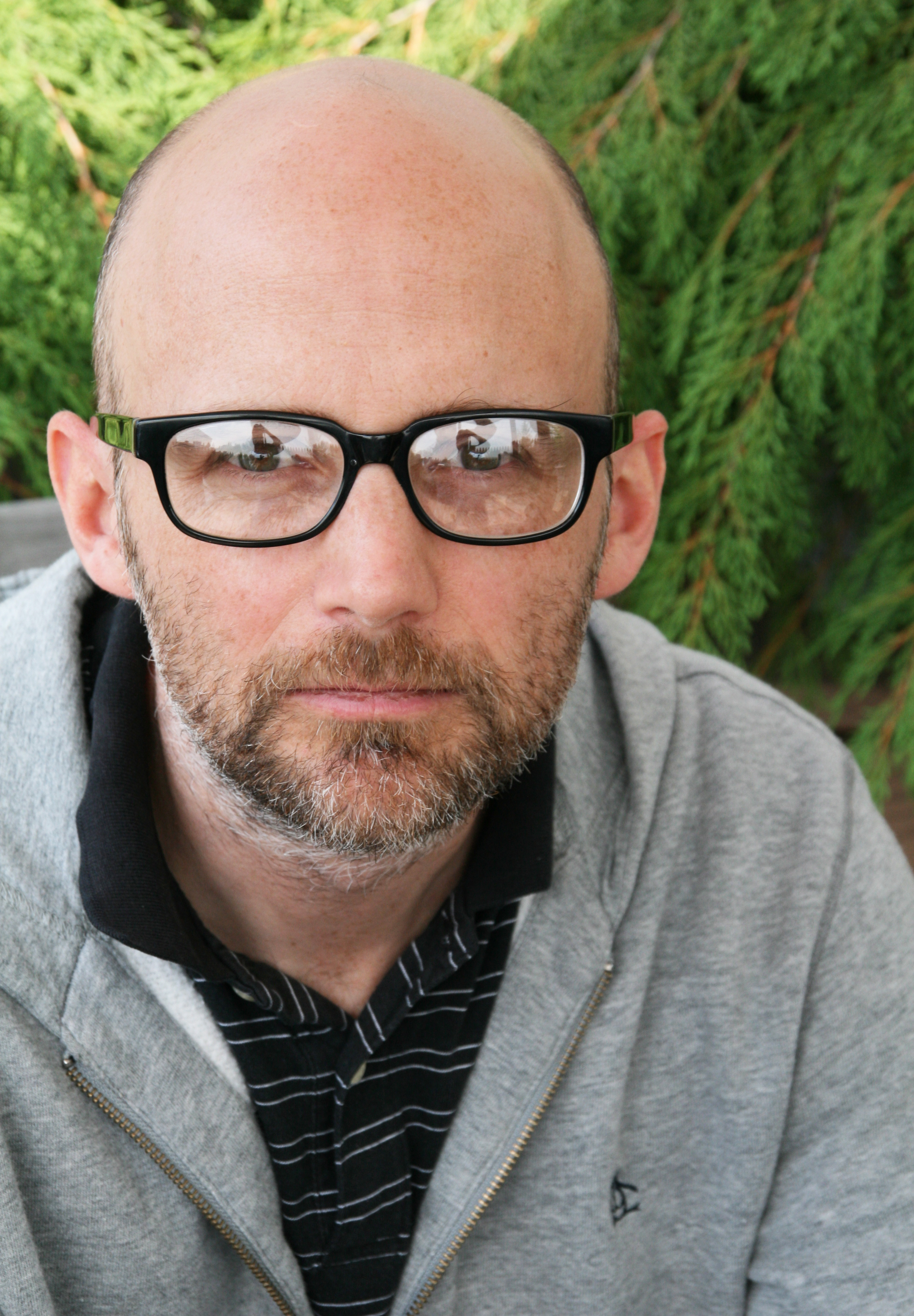
American singer-songwriter, musician and DJ Moby wrote the English part of lyrics of "Slipping Away", a song he re-recorded as a bilingual duet with Farmer.

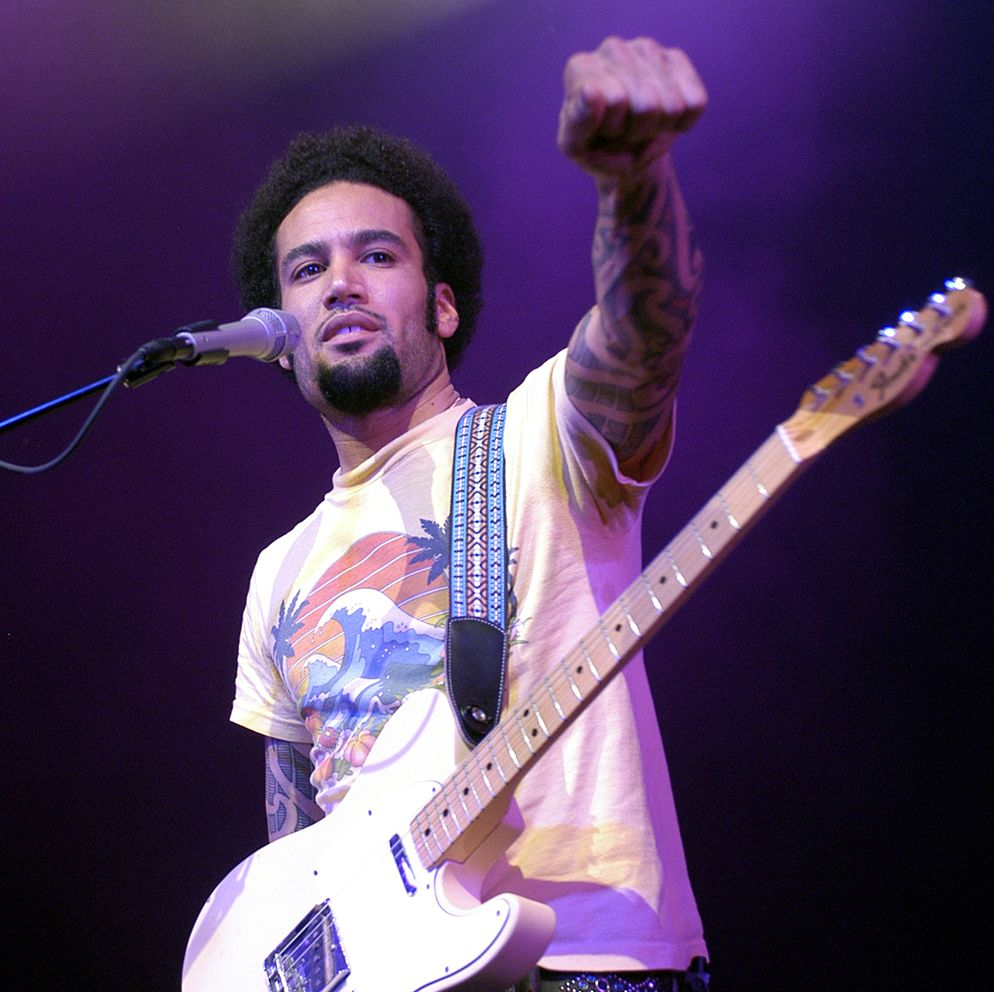
In 2010, Farmer recorded a cover of "Never Tear Us Apart"—originally performed by the Australian band INXS—as a duet with American singer-songwriter Ben Harper.

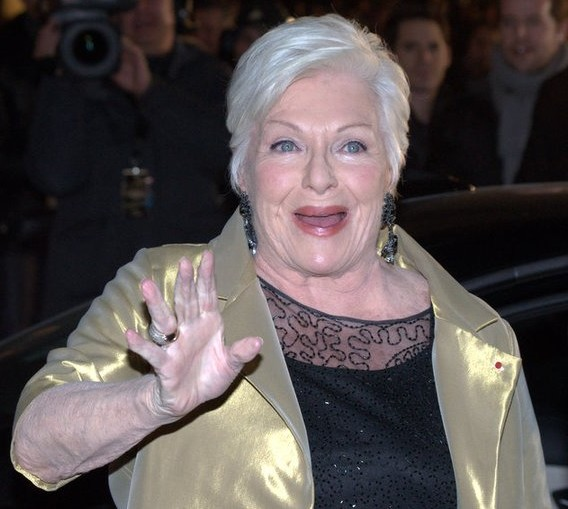
In 2010, the French singer Line Renaud recorded a duet with Farmer, titled "C'est pas l'heure".

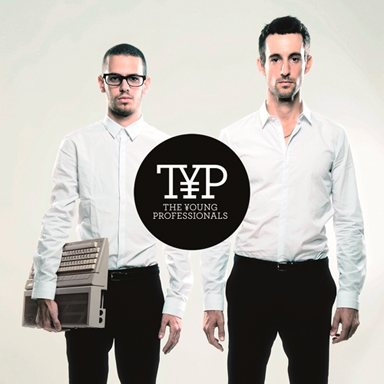
Israeli electropop band The Young Professionals participated in one of the remixes of Farmer's 2012 single "À l'ombre".

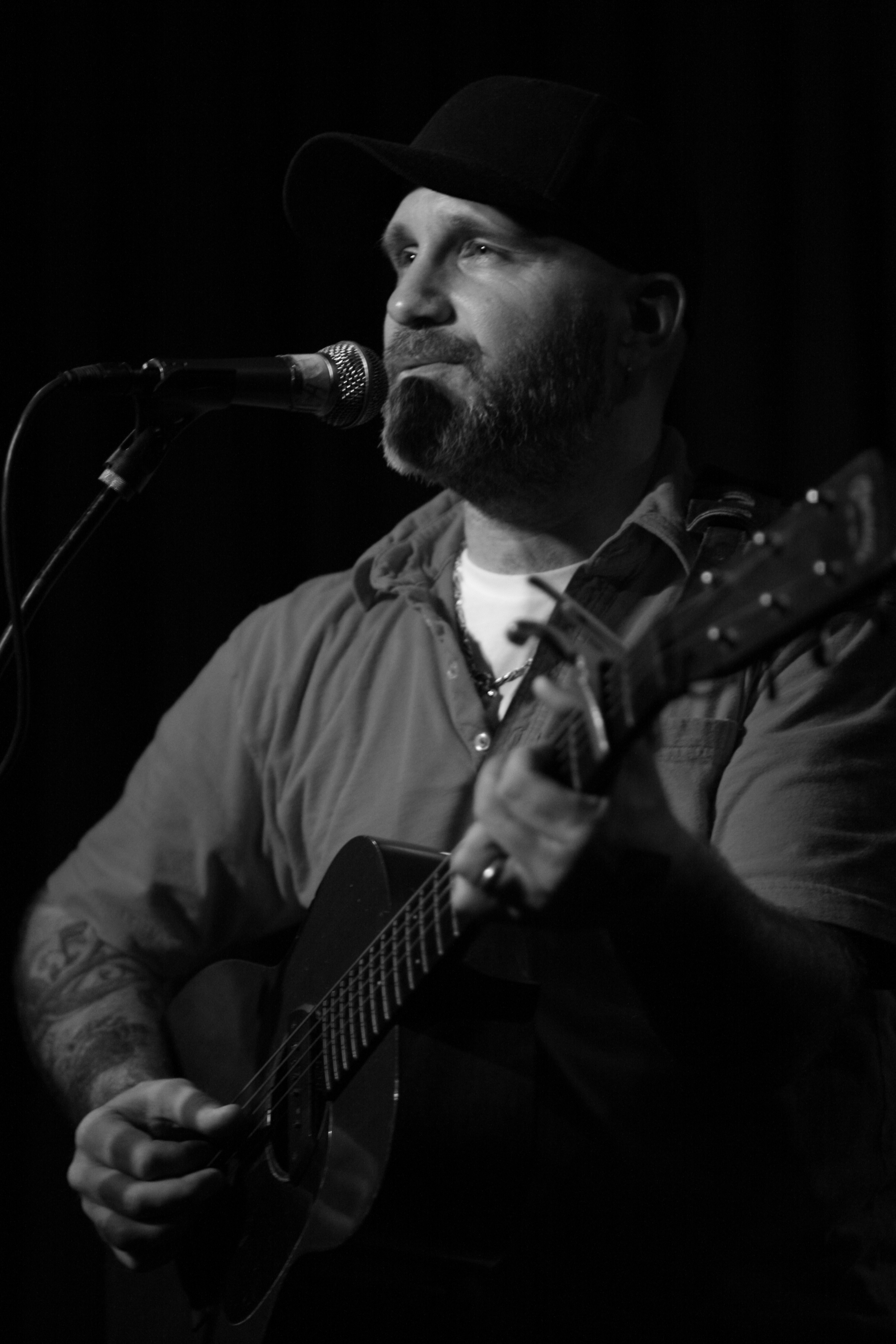
American singer-songwriter Gary Jules performed a live version with Farmer of his cover of Tears for Fears' song, "Mad World", at the Palais Omnisports de Paris-Bercy, during Farmer's 2013 tour, Timeless.

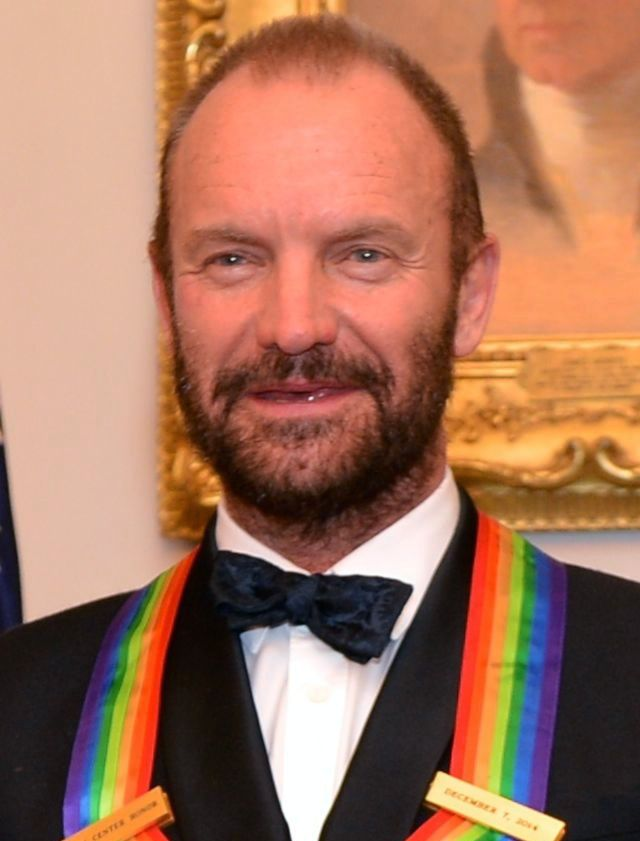
English musician and former member of The Police band Sting covered one of his song from his 2003 album Sacred Love as duet with Farmer, "Stolen Car", released in 2015.

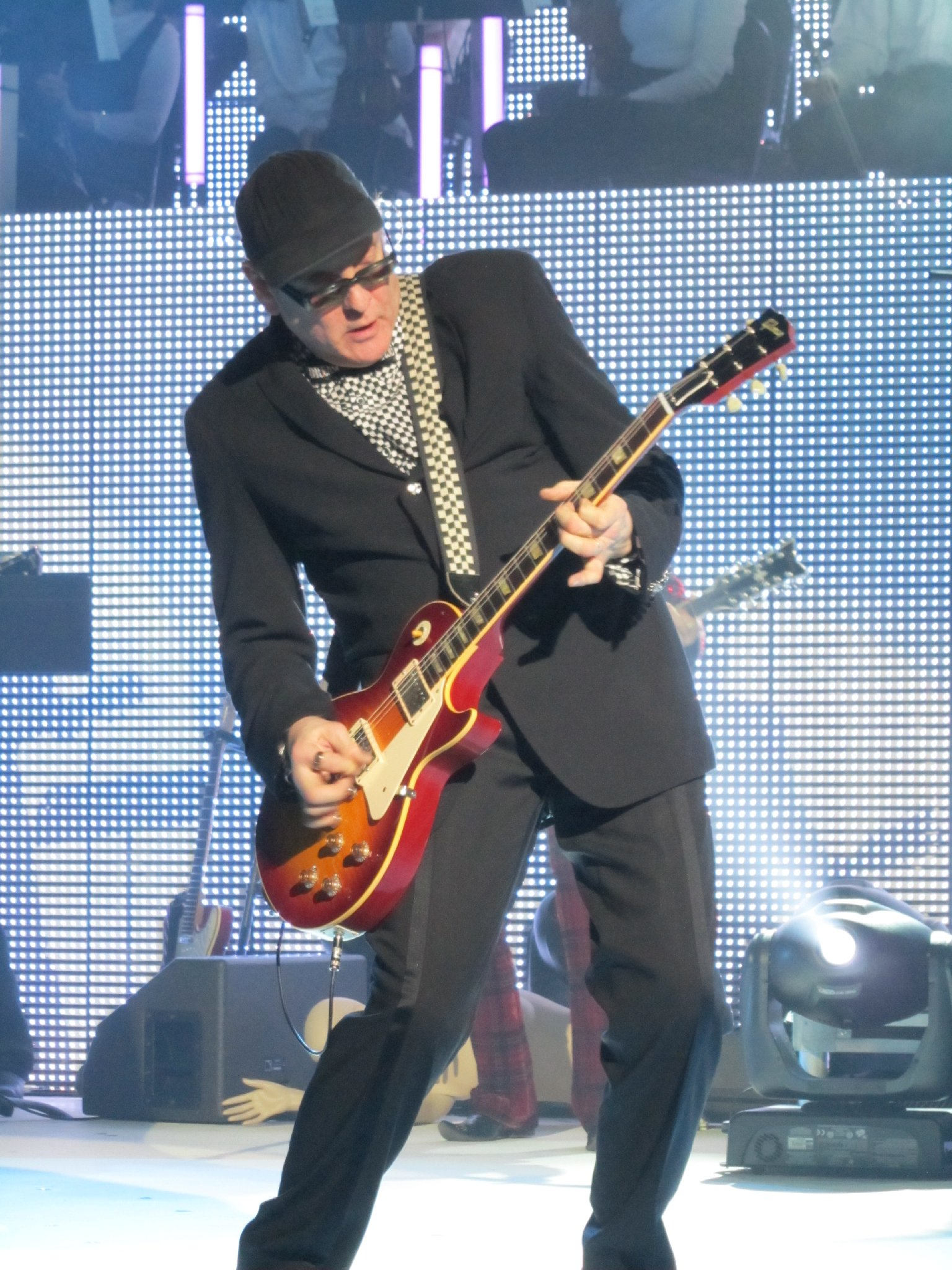
Farmer recorded a cover version of "I Want You to Want Me", a 1977 song written by Rick Nielsen, lead guitarist, backing vocalist, and primary songwriter of the rock band Cheap Trick, which features on her 2015 album Interstellaires.

Song	Release from album/single	Year	Lyrics by	Music by	Notes
"À quoi je sers..." †	En Concert	1989	Mylène Farmer	Laurent Boutonnat	
"À force de..."	Monkey Me	2012	Mylène Farmer	Laurent Boutonnat	
"À l'ombre" †	Monkey Me	2012	Mylène Farmer	Laurent Boutonnat	
"À rebours"	Interstellaires	2015	Mylène Farmer	Martin Kierszenbaum	
"À tout jamais"	—	2022	Mylène Farmer	Yoann Lemoine	
"A-t-on jamais"	Monkey Me	2012	Mylène Farmer	Laurent Boutonnat	
"Agnus Dei"	L'autre...	1991	Mylène Farmer	Laurent Boutonnat	
"Ainsi soit je..." †	Ainsi soit je...	1987	Mylène Farmer	Laurent Boutonnat	
"Aime"	Avant que l'ombre...	2005	Mylène Farmer	Laurent Boutonnat	
"Alice"	Anamorphosée	1995	Mylène Farmer	Laurent Boutonnat	
"Allan" †	Ainsi soit je...	1987	Mylène Farmer	Laurent Boutonnat	
"Ange, parle-moi"	Avant que l'ombre...	2005	Mylène Farmer	Laurent Boutonnat	
"Appelle mon numéro" †	Point de suture	2008	Mylène Farmer	Laurent Boutonnat	
"Au bout de la nuit"	Cendres de Lune	1985	Mylène Farmer	Laurent Boutonnat	
"Avant que l'ombre..." †	Avant que l'ombre...	2005	Mylène Farmer	Laurent Boutonnat	
"Ave Maria"	Point de suture	2008		Franz Schubert	Cover version, hidden track
"Bleu Noir" †	Bleu Noir	2010	Mylène Farmer	Moby	
"Beyond My Control" †	L'autre...	1991	Mylène Farmer	Laurent Boutonnat	
"C'est dans l'air" †	Point de suture	2008	Mylène Farmer	Laurent Boutonnat	
"C'est pas l'heure"	—	2010			Duet with Line Renaud
"C'est pas moi"	Interstellaires	2015	Mylène Farmer	Martin Kierszenbaum	
"C'est une belle journée" †	Les Mots	2001	Mylène Farmer	Laurent Boutonnat	
"California" †	Anamorphosée	1995	Mylène Farmer	Laurent Boutonnat	
"Cendres de lune"	Cendres de Lune	1985	—	Laurent Boutonnat	Instrumental
"Chloé"	Cendres de Lune	1985	Laurent Boutonnat	Laurent Boutonnat	
"City of Love"	Interstellaires	2015	Mylène Farmer	Martin Kierszenbaum, Matthew Koma	
"Comme j'ai mal" †	Anamorphosée	1995	Mylène Farmer	Laurent Boutonnat	
"Consentement"	Innamoramento	1999	Mylène Farmer	Laurent Boutonnat	
"Dans les rues de Londres"	Avant que l'ombre...	2005	Mylène Farmer	Laurent Boutonnat	
"Dégénération" †	Point de suture	2008	Mylène Farmer	Laurent Boutonnat	
"Dernier Sourire"	B-side of "Sans logique"	1989	Mylène Farmer	Laurent Boutonnat	
"Derrière les fenêtres"	Avant que l'ombre...	2005	Mylène Farmer	Laurent Boutonnat	
"Désenchantée" †	L'autre...	1991	Mylène Farmer	Laurent Boutonnat	
"Déshabillez-moi" †	Ainsi soit je...	1987	Robert Nyel	Gaby Verlor	Cover version
"Dessine-moi un mouton" †	Innamoramento	1999	Mylène Farmer	Laurent Boutonnat	
"Devant soi"	—	2006	Mylène Farmer	Laurent Boutonnat	Soundtrack of Jacquou le Croquant
"Diabolique mon ange"	Bleu Noir	2010	Mylène Farmer	Darius Keeler	
"Du temps" †	2001.2011	2011	Mylène Farmer	Laurent Boutonnat	
"Eaunanisme"	Anamorphosée	1995	Mylène Farmer	Laurent Boutonnat	
"Effets secondaires"	B-side of "Je te rends ton amour"	1999	Mylène Farmer	Laurent Boutonnat	
"Elle a dit"	Monkey Me	2012	Mylène Farmer	Laurent Boutonnat	
"Et pourtant..."	Avant que l'ombre...	2005	Mylène Farmer	Laurent Boutonnat	
"Et si vieillir m'était conté..."	Innamoramento	1999	Mylène Farmer	Mylène Farmer	
"Et tournoie..."	Anamorphosée	1995	Mylène Farmer	Laurent Boutonnat	
"Fuck Them All" †	Avant que l'ombre...	2005	Mylène Farmer	Laurent Boutonnat	
"Greta"	Cendres de Lune	1985	Laurent Boutonnat	Laurent Boutonnat	
"I Want You to Want Me"	Interstellaires	2015	Rick Nielsen	Martin Kierszenbaum	Cover version
"Ici-bas"	Monkey Me	2012	Mylène Farmer	Laurent Boutonnat	
"Il n'y a pas d'ailleurs"	L'autre...	1991	Mylène Farmer	Laurent Boutonnat	
"Innamoramento" †	Innamoramento	1999	Mylène Farmer	Laurent Boutonnat	
"Inseparables"	Bleu Noir	2010	Moby	Moby	English version of "Inséparables"
"Inséparables"	Bleu Noir	2010	Moby	Moby	
"Insondables"	Interstellaires	2015	Mylène Farmer	Martin Kierszenbaum	
"Interstellaires"	Interstellaires	2015	Mylène Farmer	Martin Kierszenbaum	
"J'ai essayé de vivre..."	Monkey Me	2012	Mylène Farmer	Laurent Boutonnat	
"J'attends"	Avant que l'ombre...	2005	Mylène Farmer	Laurent Boutonnat	
"Jardin de Vienne"	Ainsi soit je...	1987	Mylène Farmer	Laurent Boutonnat	
"Je m'ennuie"	Point de suture	2008	Mylène Farmer	Laurent Boutonnat	
"Je t'aime mélancolie" †	L'autre...	1991	Mylène Farmer	Laurent Boutonnat	
"Je te dis tout" †	Monkey Me	2012	Mylène Farmer	Laurent Boutonnat	
"Je te rends ton amour" †	Innamoramento	1999	Mylène Farmer	Laurent Boutonnat	
"Je voudrais tant que tu comprennes"	En Concert	1989			Cover version, only performed live
"L'Âme-Stram-Gram" †	Innamoramento	1999	Mylène Farmer	Laurent Boutonnat	
"L'Amour n'est rien..." †	Avant que l'ombre...	2005	Mylène Farmer	Laurent Boutonnat, Mylène Farmer	
"L'Amour naissant"	Innamoramento	1999	Mylène Farmer	Laurent Boutonnat	
"L'Annonciation"	B-side of "On est tous des imbéciles"	1985	Laurent Boutonnat	Laurent Boutonnat	
"L'autre"	L'autre...	1991	Mylène Farmer	Laurent Boutonnat	
"L'Histoire d'une fée, c'est..." †	Les Mots	2001	Mylène Farmer	Laurent Boutonnat	Soundtrack of Rugrats in Paris: The Movie
"L'Horloge"	Ainsi soit je...	1987	Charles Baudelaire	Laurent Boutonnat	Originally a poem
"L'Instant X" †	Anamorphosée	1995	Mylène Farmer	Laurent Boutonnat	
"La Poupée qui fait non" †	Live à Bercy	1996	Frank Gérald	Michel Polnareff	Cover version, only performed live, duet with Khaled
"La Ronde triste"	Ainsi soit je...	1987	Mylène Farmer	Laurent Boutonnat	
"La Veuve noire"	B-side of "À quoi je sers..."	1989	Mylène Farmer	Laurent Boutonnat	
"Laisse le vent emporter tout"	Anamorphosée	1995	Mylène Farmer	Laurent Boutonnat	
"Leila"	Bleu Noir	2010	Mylène Farmer	Darius Keeler	
"Les Mots" †	Les Mots	2001	Mylène Farmer	Laurent Boutonnat	Duet with Seal
"Libertine" †	Cendres de Lune	1985	Laurent Boutonnat	Jean-Claude Déquéant	
"Light Me Up"	Bleu Noir	2010	Mylène Farmer	Darius Keeler	
"Lonely Lisa" †	Bleu Noir	2010	Mylène Farmer	RedOne	
"Looking for My Name"	Point de suture	2008	Mylène Farmer	Laurent Boutonnat	Duet with Moby
"Love Dance"	Monkey Me	2012	Mylène Farmer	Laurent Boutonnat	
"Love Song"	Interstellaires	2015	Mylène Farmer	Martin Kierszenbaum	
"M'effondre"	Bleu Noir	2010	Mylène Farmer	Moby	
"Mad World"	Timeless 2013	2013	Roland Orzabal	Roland Orzabal	Live cover version, duet with Gary Jules
"Maman a tort" †	Cendres de Lune	1984	Jérôme Dahan	Laurent Boutonnat	
"Méfie-toi"	Innamoramento	1999	Mylène Farmer	Mylène Farmer	
"Moi je veux..."	Bleu Noir	2010	Mylène Farmer	Moby	
"Monkey Me" †	Monkey Me	2012	Mylène Farmer	Laurent Boutonnat	
"My Mum Is Wrong" †	—	1984	Jérôme Dahan	Laurent Boutonnat	English version of "Maman a tort"
"My Soul Is Slashed" †	—	1992	Mylène Farmer	Laurent Boutonnat	English version of "Que mon cœur lâche"
"Mylène Is Calling"	B-side of "Je t'aime mélancolie"	1991	Mylène Farmer	Laurent Boutonnat	
"Mylène s'en fout"	Anamorphosée	1995	Mylène Farmer	Laurent Boutonnat	
"Mylénium"	Innamoramento	1999	—	Laurent Boutonnat	
"N'aie plus d'amertume"	Bleu Noir	2010	Mylène Farmer	Moby	
"Never Tear Us Apart"	—	2010	Michael Hutchence, Mylène Farmer	Andrew Farriss	Cover version, duet with Ben Harper
"Nobody Knows"	Avant que l'ombre...	2005	Mylène Farmer	Laurent Boutonnat	Hidden track
"Nous souviendrons-nous"	L'autre...	1991	Mylène Farmer	Laurent Boutonnat	
"Nuit d'hiver"	Monkey Me	2012	Mylène Farmer	Laurent Boutonnat	Partial cover version of Farmer's 1986 song "Chloé"
"On est tous des imbéciles" †	—	1985	Jérôme Dahan	Jérôme Dahan	
"Optimistique-moi" †	Innamoramento	1999	Mylène Farmer	Mylène Farmer	
"Oui mais... non" †	Bleu Noir	2010	Mylène Farmer	RedOne	
"Paradis inanimé"	Point de suture	2008	Mylène Farmer	Laurent Boutonnat	
"Pardonne-moi" †	Les Mots	2001	Mylène Farmer	Laurent Boutonnat	
"Pas d'access"	Interstellaires	2015	Mylène Farmer	Martin Kierszenbaum	
"Pas de doute"	L'autre...	1991	Mylène Farmer	Laurent Boutonnat	
"Pas le temps de vivre"	Innamoramento	1999	Mylène Farmer	Mylène Farmer	
"Peut-être toi" †	Avant que l'ombre...	2005	Mylène Farmer	Laurent Boutonnat	
"Plus grandir" †	Cendres de Lune	1985	Mylène Farmer	Laurent Boutonnat	
"Point de suture"	Point de suture	2008	Mylène Farmer	Laurent Boutonnat	
"Porno graphique"	Avant que l'ombre...	2005	Mylène Farmer	Laurent Boutonnat	
"Pourvu qu'elles soient douces" †	Ainsi soit je...	1987	Mylène Farmer	Laurent Boutonnat	
"Psychiatric"	L'autre...	1991	Mylène Farmer	Laurent Boutonnat	
"Puisque..."	B-side of "Pourvu qu'elles soient douces"	1988	Mylène Farmer	Laurent Boutonnat	
"Q.I" †	Avant que l'ombre...	2005	Mylène Farmer	Laurent Boutonnat	
"Quand"	Monkey Me	2012	Mylène Farmer	Laurent Boutonnat	
"Que mon cœur lâche" †	Dance Remixes	1992	Mylène Farmer	Laurent Boutonnat	
"Redonne-moi" †	Avant que l'ombre...	2005	Mylène Farmer	Laurent Boutonnat	
"Regrets" †	L'autre...	1991	Mylène Farmer	Laurent Boutonnat	Duet with Jean-Louis Murat
"Réveiller le monde"	Point de suture	2008	Mylène Farmer	Laurent Boutonnat	
"Rêver"	Anamorphosée	1995	Mylène Farmer	Laurent Boutonnat	
"Sans contrefaçon" †	Ainsi soit je...	1987	Mylène Farmer	Laurent Boutonnat	
"Sans logique" †	Ainsi soit je...	1987	Mylène Farmer	Laurent Boutonnat	
"Serais-tu là?"	Innamoramento	1999	Mylène Farmer	Mylène Farmer	
"Sextonik" †	Point de suture	2008	Mylène Farmer	Laurent Boutonnat	
"Si j'avais au moins..." †	Point de suture	2008	Mylène Farmer	Laurent Boutonnat	
"Slipping Away (Crier la vie)" †	—	2006	Mylène Farmer, Moby	Moby	Cover version, duet with Moby
"Sois moi – Be Me"	2001.2011	2011	Mylène Farmer	Laurent Boutonnat	
"Souviens-toi du jour" †	Innamoramento	1999	Mylène Farmer	Laurent Boutonnat	
"Stolen Car" †	Interstellaires	2015	Mylène Farmer	Sting	Cover version, duet with Sting
"The Farmer's Conclusion"	Ainsi soit je...	1987	—	Laurent Boutonnat	Instrumental
"Toi l'amour"	Bleu Noir	2010	Mylène Farmer	Moby	
"Tomber 7 fois..."	Anamorphosée	1995	Mylène Farmer	Mylène Farmer	
"Tous ces combats"	Avant que l'ombre...	2005	Mylène Farmer	Laurent Boutonnat	
"Tristana" †	Cendres de Lune	1985	Mylène Farmer	Laurent Boutonnat	
"Tu ne le dis pas"	Monkey Me	2012	Mylène Farmer	Laurent Boutonnat	
"Un jour ou l'autre"	Interstellaires	2015	Mylène Farmer	Martin Kierszenbaum	
"Vertige"	Anamorphosée	1995	Mylène Farmer	Laurent Boutonnat	
"Vieux Bouc"	Cendres de Lune	1985	Laurent Boutonnat	Laurent Boutonnat	
"Voie lactée"	Interstellaires	2015	Mylène Farmer	Martin Kierszenbaum	
"We'll Never Die"	Cendres de Lune	1985	Laurent Boutonnat	Laurent Boutonnat	
"XXL" †	Anamorphosée	1995	Mylène Farmer	Laurent Boutonnat	

== See also ==
- Mylène Farmer discography

== Notes and references ==
- Cachin, Benoît (2006). Le Dictionnaire des Chansons de Mylène Farmer (in French). Tournon. ISBN 2-35144-000-5.
- Cachin, Benoît (2012). Mylène Farmer, au fil des mots (in French). France: Gründ. ISBN 978-2-32400-364-6.
