= Les Mots =

Les Mots may refer to:

- "Les Mots" (song), a 2001 single by Mylène Farmer and Seal
- Les Mots (album), a 2001 album by Mylène Farmer
- Les Mots (book), the 1963 autobiography of Jean-Paul Sartre
