= Imbecile (disambiguation) =

Imbecile is an archaic psychiatric term used to denote intellectual disability.

Imbecile may also refer to:

- Imbecile d' Amour, one-man opera performed by Zachary James
- On est tous des imbéciles, 1984 song recorded by French artist Mylène Farmer
- Vile Imbeciles, English rock band
