= Dessine-moi un mouton =

Single by Mylène Farmer

from the album Mylenium Tour
- B-side: "Dernier Sourire" (live)
- Released: 5 December 2000
- Recorded: 1999, France
- Genre: Pop rock, alternative rock
- Length: 4:50 (live version); 4:34 (studio version)
- Label: Polydor
- Songwriters: Lyrics: Mylène Farmer; Music: Laurent Boutonnat
- Producer: Laurent Boutonnat

Mylène Farmer singles chronology
"Innamoramento" (2000)	"Dessine-moi un mouton" (2000)	"L'Histoire d'une fée, c'est..." (2001)

Alternative cover
- CD maxi

"Dessine-moi un mouton" (English: "Draw Me a Sheep") is a 1999 song recorded by French singer-songwriter Mylène Farmer, first in a studio version, then in a live version during her 1999 concert Mylenium Tour. The song was the only single from her third live album Mylenium Tour and was released on 5 December 2000. The title draws from a direct quotation to a well-known scene in the French children's book Le Petit Prince by Antoine de Saint-Exupéry. Although it was generally appreciated by critics and was a top ten hit in France, it had moderate success in terms of sales.

== Background and writing ==
Originally, "Dessine-moi un mouton" should have been released as the second, third, or fourth single from the studio album Innamoramento. However, the song was released much later, and only in a live version to promote the concert album Mylenium Tour. Because of this discrepancy, some people considered the song to be, in fact, the sixth single from the previous studio album. Thus, with this rationale, Innamoramento is the second album in France to provide six top ten hits in France.

Just before the single's release, a rumor circulated that a video was already underway and would be filmed in Corsica to evoke drawn images found in Saint-Exupéry's famous novella, which profoundly inspired the song. According to another persistent rumor, Farmer planned to buy some rights to the story from the author's family to create a musical directed by other producers. Finally, none of this gossip proved correct.

The promotional CD was sent to radio stations on 27 October, and the single was concurrently released with the live album to enable it to move straight to number one on the French Album Charts. All the remixes were produced after the album version, not the live version. Quickly, French station NRJ heavily played the remix called 'World is mine' instead of the live version. For the first time in her career, Farmer used her own drawings to illustrate the CD maxi and vinyl's covers, on which she represented herself next to a sheep. She also used her drawings for the video of "C'est une belle journée", as well as in her book Lisa-Loup et le Conteur. As for the single release of "Sans logique" eleven years earlier, the B-side is "Dernier Sourire", this time in the live version.

However, when the best of album Les Mots was released in 2001, the song was not included in the track listing, like other live singles "Allan" and "La Poupée qui fait non".

== Theme and video ==
As Saint-Exupéry's story, Le Petit Prince, is deeply incorporated within French mainstream popular culture, francophone audience clearly understood the allusion of the song to the literary work. Therefore, "Farmer does not tell the novella's story in her song, but uses the writer's philosophy to draw inspiration". Journalist Benoît Cachin said "Dessine-moi un mouton" deals with life, love, death, and is "a plea for childhood, imagination and insouciance". Psychologist Hugues Royer considers that it is a song that "invites us to connect with our childhood".

The video uses images from the 1999 tour, and shows Farmer performing the song sitting on a giant swing. For the television version, the entire part devoted to the presentation of musicians and the recalls were deleted, but included in footage for the tour's DVD.

== Live performances ==
The song was not promoted by the singer and was never performed on television, but was only sung during the Mylenium Tour. As showed on the DVD of the concert, before the song begins, Farmer is sitting on the steps of the staircase and she whistles. While the dancers make several acrobatics and play leapfrog, she performs the song, sitting on a big swing with two headers sphynx at both ends. A rain of silver sequins down from heaven on artists and the audience. After her performance, Farmer goes down the swing and presents the musicians.

== Critical reception ==
"Dessine-moi un mouton" was generally well received by contemporary pop music critics and by Farmer's fans who felt that the single was the best track of the album. The Belgian magazine La Dernière Heure considered this song absolutely identical to "XXL", using many big guitars; it also said that it was very representative of Farmer's work and was sensed as a future single since the album's release. French magazine Instant-Mag considered that the singles' sales were not aided by the CD single's cover deemed too simple, and that the live version loses much of its energy compared to the studio's one because of the choice of musical arrangements. Moreover, the remixes were generally deemed disappointing, unlike Farmer's drawings used on the CD maxi which were more appreciated.

In France, the single entered the singles chart at number six on 9 December 2000, making Farmer's 21st top ten hit in the country. The next week, it dropped to number 28 then continued to drop, and fell off the chart after nine weeks in the top 50 and 16 weeks in the top 100. In Switzerland, the song reached a peak of number 59 in the third week on 21 January 2001 and remained for five weeks in the top 100. In Belgium (Wallonia), the single started at number 25 in the Ultratop 40 chart on 16 December 2000, then climbed to a peak of number 11, dropped the next weeks and totaled twelve weeks on the chart.

== Formats and track listings ==
These are the formats and track listings of single releases of "Dessine-moi un mouton":

- CD single

No.	Title	Length
1.	"Dessine-moi un mouton" (live)	4:50
2.	"Dernier Sourire" (live)	4:53

- CD maxi - Digipack / 12" maxi / 12" maxi - Promo

No.	Title	Length
1.	"Dessine-moi un mouton" (live single version)	4:34
2.	"Dessine-moi un mouton" (world is mine remix)	4:53
3.	"Dessine-moi un mouton" (snakebite beat remix)	4:42
4.	"Dessine-moi un mouton" (draw me a sheep remix)	3:53

- CD single - Promo - Silvery disc / CD single - Promo - White disc

No.	Title	Length
1.	"Dessine-moi un mouton" (live single version)	4:34

- CD single - Promo - Tryptic with a swing

No.	Title	Length
1.	"Dessine-moi un mouton" (live radio edit)	4:05

- VHS - Promo

No.	Title	Length
1.	"Dessine-moi un mouton" (video)	4:56

== Official versions ==
Version	Length	Album	Remixed by	Year	Comment
Album version	4:34	Innamoramento	—	1999	See the previous sections
Live version (recorded in 2000)	4:50 (CD); 6:40 (DVD/VHS); 4:16 (cassette)	Mylenium Tour	—	2000	This version is rather similar to the album one, but before starting the song, Farmer whistles. The DVD and VHS version includes the presentation of the musicians. The cassette version is shorter as one refrain is deleted. (see Mylenium Tour)
Single live version	4:34	—	Laurent Boutonnat	2000	The last refrain is deleted.
Live radio edit	4:05	—	Laurent Boutonnat	2000	This version is similar to the two previous above, but shorter.
World is mine remix	4:53	—	Quentin and Visa	2000	This version is calmer than the studio version.
Snakebite beat mix	4:42	—	Osman and Visa	2000	This is an electro remix.
Draw me a sheep remix	3:53	—	Hot Sly and Visa	2000	Devoted to the dance floors, this remix sometimes distorts Farmer's voice.
Music video	4:56	—	—	2000	

== Credits and personnel ==
These are the credits and the personnel as they appear on the back of the single:

- Mylène Farmer – lyrics, drawings
- Laurent Boutonnat – music
- Requiem Publishing – editions
- Polydor – recording company
- Henry Neu / Com'N.B – design
- Made in the E.U.

== Charts ==
Weekly chart performance for "Dessine-moi un mouton"
Chart (2000–01)	Peak position
Belgium (Ultratop 50 Wallonia)	11
Europe (Eurochart Hot 100 Singles)	30
France (SNEP)	6
Switzerland (Schweizer Hitparade)	59

== Release history ==
Region	Date	Format
France, Belgium, Switzerland	November 2000	Promo CD single, Promo 12" maxi, VHS
France, Belgium, Switzerland	4 December 2000	CD single, CD maxi, 12" maxi
