= L'Histoire d'une fée, c'est... =

2001 single by Mylène Farmer

Single by Mylène Farmer

from the album Les Mots and Rugrats in Paris: The Movie: Music From the Motion Picture
- English title: "The Story of a Fairy Is..."
- B-side: "Instrumental"
- Released: 27 February 2001
- Recorded: August 2000, France
- Genre: Synthpop; electronica
- Length: 5:11
- Label: Polydor
- Songwriters: Lyrics: Mylène Farmer; Music: Laurent Boutonnat
- Producer: Laurent Boutonnat

Mylène Farmer singles chronology
| "Dessine-moi un mouton" (2000) | "L'Histoire d'une fée, c'est..." (2001) | "Les Mots" (2001) |

"L'Histoire d'une fée, c'est..." (English: "The Story of a Fairy Is...") is a 2001 song recorded by French singer-songwriter Mylène Farmer. It was one of the singles from the soundtrack album for the film Rugrats in Paris: The Movie (known in France as Les Razmokets à Paris). With its lyrics written by Farmer and the song being composed and produced by her long-time songwriting collaborator Laurent Boutonnat, "L'Histoire d'une fée, c'est..." was released on 27 February 2001. The song describes the fairy Mélusine with "childish" lyrics that contrast with double entendres and puns referring to sexual practices. Although the single had no music video nor airplay promotion, it received generally positive reviews from critics and reached top-ten charts in France and Belgium.

== Background and writing ==
Rugrats in Paris: The Movie was the second in a trilogy of films based on the children's animated television series Rugrats, which features the adventures of a group of toddlers. After filming, the producers wanted to record a soundtrack for the movie with mainly French songs, as well as a few in English. Several singers were contacted, including TLC member Tionne Watkins, the 1990s boys band 2Be3, Sinéad O'Connor, Cyndi Lauper and Mylène Farmer. Persistent but unconfirmed rumours claimed that Madonna, as the founder of the Maverick company producing the soundtrack, had expressly asked Farmer to participate in the album. Farmer accepted, but preferred to produce a new song instead of licensing the rights to one of her old compositions. The recording label Maverick signed a contract for an unreleased song, with lyrics written by Farmer and music composed by her songwriting partner Laurent Boutonnat. This was the first time that the singer had recorded a song especially for a movie. An English version was canceled in favour of a French version, and eventually the song only played for about 15 seconds in the movie. The first title chosen, "Attrapez-moi", was also quickly abandoned as it was too similar to the Pokémon's cry of "Attrapez-les tous".

== Music and lyrics ==
"L'Histoire d'une fée, c'est..." is a synthpop song. It tells the story of a mischievous and malicious fairy, Mélusine, here embodied by Farmer. Lyrically, the song uses words referring to magic, baffling several of Farmer's fans as the lyrics seem to be closer to the themes found in songs by young singers such as Alizée. The lyrics also contain several double entendres and puns which refer to sexual practices. The song's title itself is ambiguous and can be deemed sexually suggestive as it contains a pun in French alluding to spanking: in French, the title "L'Histoire d'une fée, c'est..." could be phonetically understand as meaning "L'Histoire d'une fessée..." (translation: "The Story of a Spanking").

== Release ==
In Europe the soundtrack release was postponed until 7 February 2001 because Farmer had bought the song's royalties and finally decided to release it as a single, 14 days later. It was only released as a digipack CD single, in which the song's lyrics are written inside, and there was no promotional format. For the second time in the singer's career – after the song "XXL" – the single cover does not show her, but a drawing of a fairy from the film by Tom Madrid. The song began circulating online a month before the soundtrack's release and was well received by many fans who felt that it could be a hit. The song did not receive much radio airplay, with only Europe 2 playing it regularly. "L'Histoire d'une fée, c'est..." was also released on the soundtrack of the film in a longer version than the CD single version, and was later included on Mylène Farmer's greatest hits album Les Mots. It was also released as the third track on the European CD maxi "Les Mots", released in the Switzerland on 4 September 2002.

== Critical reception ==
The song was generally well received by critics, who particularly noted the puns. According to author Erwan Chuberre, the lyrics are "as funny as disillusioned" and Farmer uses puns that "highlight her immoderate pleasure for impolite pleasures", with a music he deemed "effective". Author Thierry Desaules said that the song appears to be a childish fairly tale, but is actually structured in a perverse enough way to address the adult public, as the allusions to the spanking can be seen as references to sadomasochism. Journalist Benoît Cachin wrote that her puns are "of the funniest" and that the singer included in the lyrics "some very personal thoughts", including sadness; he added that Farmer appears to be "fun, dynamic and delightfully mischievous" on this song.

== Chart performance ==
On 3 March 2001, the single debuted at a peak of number nine on the French SNEP Singles Chart, providing Farmer her 22nd top ten hit. In the following weeks, the song fell steadily and remained in the top 50 for nine weeks and a total of 15 weeks on the chart. This chart performance was surprising given that the song was aired little on radio, the film met a mixed commercial success in France and there was no music video, no promotion on television, and only one format. According to Instant-Mag the beauty of the single's cover undoubtedly helped increase sales. In Belgium, the single started at number 23 on 15 March 2001, climbed to number 11, then peaked at number 10. Thereafter, it dropped and fell off the Ultratop 50 after 13 weeks. On the 2001 Belgian singles year-end chart, "L'Histoire d'une fée, c'est..." ranked at number 89.

== Formats and track listings ==
These are the formats and track listings of single releases of "L'Histoire d'une fée, c'est...":

- CD single – Digipack

| No. | Title | Length |
|---|---|---|
| 1. | "L'Histoire d'une fée, c'est..." (single version) | 4:44 |
| 2. | "L'Histoire d'une fée, c'est..." (instrumental) | 5:00 |

== Official versions ==
| Version | Length | Album | Year | Note |
|---|---|---|---|---|
| Film soundtrack version | 5:10 | Rugrats in Paris: The Movie | 2000 | See the previous sections |
| Album version | 5:00 | Les Mots | 2001 | See the previous sections |
| Single version | 4:44 | — | 2001 | The music at the end of the song is shortened. |
| Instrumental version | 5:00 | — | 2001 | All the lyrics are deleted. |

== Credits and personnel ==
These are the credits and the personnel as they appear on the back of the single:

- Mylène Farmer – lyrics
- Laurent Boutonnat – music, producer
- John Eng – artistic director
- Gena Kornyshev – stylist
- Tom Madrid – drawings
- Requiem Publishing – editions
- Polydor – recording company
- Henry Neu – design
- Bertrand Chatenet – mixing

== Charts ==
=== Peak positions ===
| Chart (2001) | Peak position |
|---|---|
| Belgian (Wallonia) Singles Chart | 10 |
| Europe (European Hot 100 Singles) | 40 |
| French SNEP Singles Chart | 9 |

=== Year-end charts ===
| Chart (2001) | Position |
|---|---|
| Belgian (Wallonia) Singles Chart | 89 |

=== Sales ===
| Country | Certification | Physical sales |
|---|---|---|
| France | — | 70,000 |

== Release history ==
| Region | Date | Format |
|---|---|---|
| France, Belgium | 21 February 2001 | CD single |
