= Les Mots (song) =

Single by Mylène Farmer and Seal

from the album Les Mots
- Released: 13 November 2001
- Recorded: 2001, France
- Genre: Pop, classical
- Length: 4:50
- Label: Polydor
- Songwriters: Lyrics: Mylène Farmer; Music: Laurent Boutonnat
- Producer: Laurent Boutonnat

Mylène Farmer singles chronology
"L'Histoire d'une fée, c'est..." (2001)	"Les Mots" (2001)	"C'est une belle journée" (2002)

Seal singles chronology
"This Could Be Heaven" (2001)	"Les Mots" (2001)	"My Vision" (2002)

"Les Mots" (English: "The Words") is a 2001 song recorded as a duet by the French singer-songwriter Mylène Farmer and the English soul singer Seal. It was the first single from her best of album, Les Mots, and was released on 13 November 2001. It was Farmer's third duet, after those with Jean-Louis Murat in 1991 and Khaled in 1997, and her first international duet. "Les Mots" is a bilingual song, containing verses in French (sung by Farmer) and in English (by Seal). In terms of sales, "Les Mots" is Farmer's fourth biggest success in France, behind "Désenchantée", "Pourvu qu'elles soient douces" and "Sans contrefaçon".

== Background and writing ==
In October 2001, the release of the second single from the live album Mylenium Tour, "Regrets", was cancelled because sales of the previous live single "Dessine-moi un mouton" were disappointing (however, the video of "Regrets" was shown for one week on M6). But since the summer, various rumours were launched on the Internet about her next single. Some said that she would record a song as a duet with an international star, perhaps Bono (singer of U2) or Elton John, since they are close friends of the singer. Seal was eventually chosen to sing with Farmer and, on 10 October, the promotional CD single of "Les Mots" was sent to radio stations. In an interview, Seal explained that Farmer had proposed to record a single as a duet with him. He felt flattered, but as he knew nothing about Farmer, he watched her DVD and listened to her albums to see if their voices blended well. Cover photographs and the recording were made in Los Angeles while Farmer was visiting the city. However, Seal said in another interview that he did not want to record other duets of the same kind because, according to him, his fans did not appreciate "Les Mots" and have called this collaboration a "trick". Three new photos made by Isabel Snyder, showing a half-naked Farmer in Seal's arms, were used as cover for the single. The only official remix available on the media, the "strings's for soul mix", was directed by Laurent Boutonnat. Following the success of the song, a CD maxi was launched in Europe about one year after the release of the single, which contained as a third track the single version of Farmer's previous single, "L'Histoire d'une fée, c'est...".

== Music and lyrics ==
This melancholy song has fairly simple lyrics. The journalist Benoît Cachin said that in this song, "Farmer pays tribute to the words which have enabled her to write her songs, which are also used to express her love". About the song, the French magazine Instant-mag made the following analysis: "On an air melody and worthy flights of Boutonnat, the two voices, paradoxical but complementary, tell us the difficulty communicating and the immense power of words. Where the beautiful voice of Farmer will force up to the break, that of Seal evokes a quiet and sensual strength". One of the verses of "Les Mots" ("And to lives that stoop to notice mine", sung by Seal) repeated the first verse of Farmer's song "Nous souviendrons-nous" ("Aux vies qui s'abaissent à voir la mienne") which is on her third studio album L'Autre.... The works of Emily Dickinson was also a source of inspiration for the song. Indeed, the phrase "I will tell you how the sun rose", sung by Seal, is the title of her poem No. 318.

== Music video ==
=== Production and plot ===
Mylène Farmer on the raft in the music video "Les Mots". This scene shows the similarities with Théodore Géricault's painting Raft of the Medusa.

The music video was filmed on 8 and 9 October and was directed by Laurent Boutonnat, Farmer's songwriting partner. It was a return by Boutonnat as Farmer's film director as her last video, "Beyond My Control", was directed by him in 1992. The screenplay was written by Boutonnat and Farmer, and it was a Requiem Publishing and Stuffed Monkey production. Shot over two days, it cost about 100,000 euros and it was the first time that Boutonnat used special effects in a Farmer video.

The two singers did not meet to shoot the video. According to some sources, because of the 11 September 2001, terrorist attacks, Seal refused to take a plane to France. However, Seal told a French magazine that the true reason is that their schedules clashed. The images in which he appears were filmed separately in Los Angeles, while Farmer recorded her scenes at Arpajon Studios in Paris. When, in the video, a man is on the raft with Farmer, it is a body double. Seal said that Farmer had suffered from the very cold water used during the video's shooting. The sea was created in a studio in a large pool, using a machine for waves, rain and lightning. Nearly 50 technicians were involved. The video was first broadcast on M6 on 7 November 2001. There were two versions: one for television, the other for the collector DVD Les Mots.

The video shows the two singers in the middle of an ocean. Farmer, dressed in a short black skirt, and Seal, stripped to the waist, are on a wooden raft with a small sail and start to row. While Farmer stretches out on the raft, a storm begins to arrive, the wind picks up, the rain falls and lightning illuminates the sky. Seal, standing on the raft, loses his balance and falls into the water. Farmer tries to save, him giving him her hand, but without success. The night starts to fall and Farmer, now alone on the raft, lights a match and puts it out immediately.

=== Inspiration and analysis ===
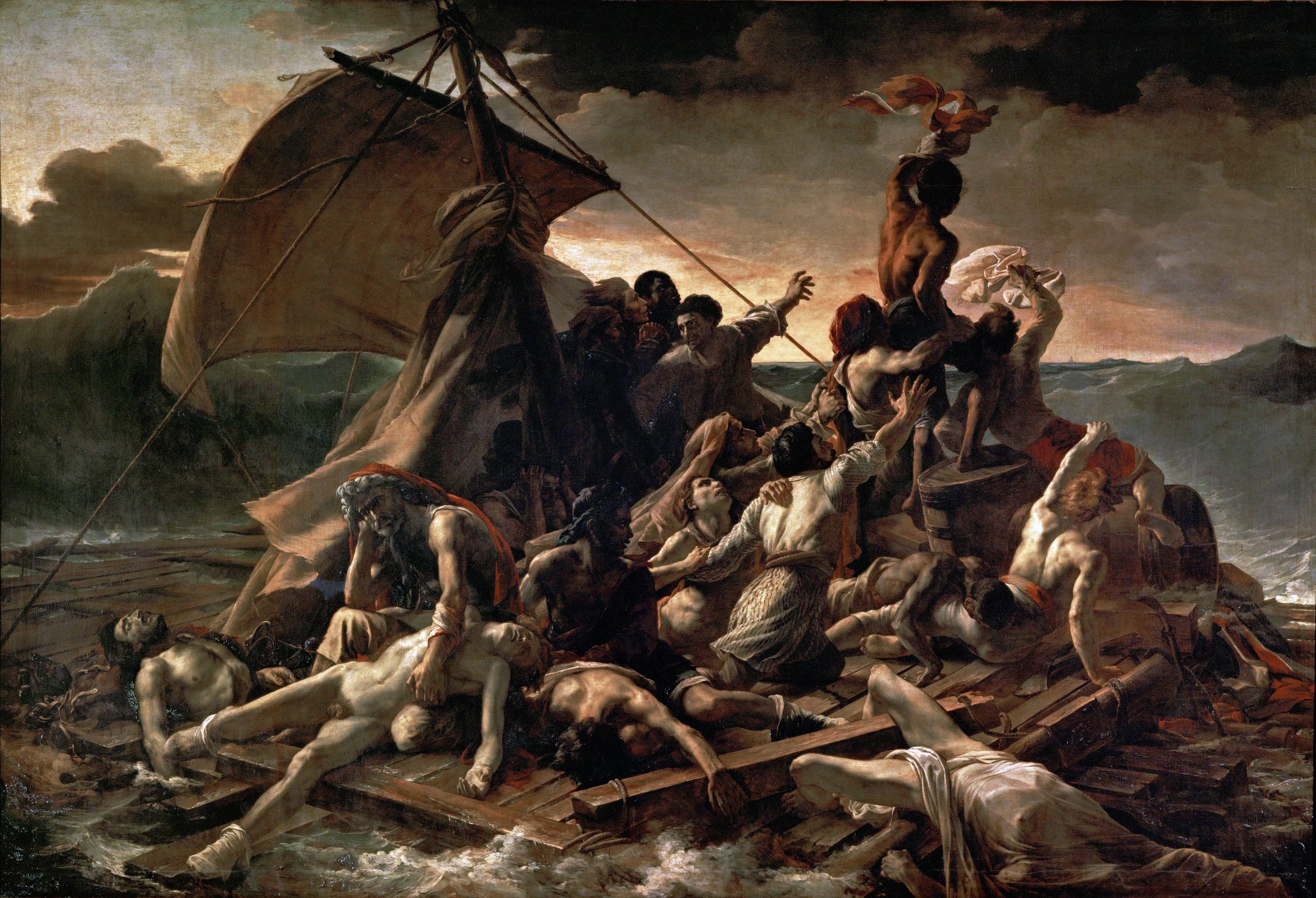
The music video for "Les Mots" draws its inspiration from Théodore Géricault's painting Raft of the Medusa.

The video contains some references to Shakespeare's Othello, but was mainly inspired by The Raft of the Medusa, a 1918 Théodore Géricault painting. Indeed, "the main colors of the video are similar to that in the painting: yellow, sunset, dark, warning of misfortunes. The anatomy of the two singers is filmed with realism and precision (details on the bodies' parts, focus on the grains of skin) and may refer to those of the shipwreckeds in the painting. Finally, the replicas of the raft and the sailing are very resembling".

According to Instant-Mag, "the video "Les Mots" – without real screenplay, but rather playing on the aesthetics of colors and the sensual bodies filmed – can be appreciated on two levels: the first, metaphorical (...), refers to the flow of life, its turmoil, its despair, its choices. The lovers are (...) in the "same boat", they "row". When Seal fell in the water, Mylène Farmer doesn't help or can't help him, all interpretations are free. The end of the video may also symbolize the grief, the loss and its ambivalence: Farmer lights a flame, then blows it out, master of her own destiny and emotions." The journalist Caroline Bee considers the video deals with "the world of dream, with the ocean as a metaphor for life: the turmoil and the fullness, the danger and the calm."

== Critical reception ==
Reviews

"Les Mots" was generally very well received by the public, but was moderately appreciated by Farmer's fans because of its lack of innovation. For example, the biographer Bernard Violet says that "Les Mots" appears to be a typical Farmer's ballad, with a dark romanticism. According to the author Erwan Chuberre, the song "does not shine by its originality" and recalls "Rêver" or "Il n'y a pas d'ailleurs", but "fortunately, the union of the crooner voice of Seal to the star's one works wonderfully". The song was nominated as the best duet in the 2002 NRJ Music Awards, but the prize was awarded to Garou and Céline Dion for their song "Sous le vent". Farmer, however, won for the third time the prize Francophone Female Artist of the Year.

Chart performances

The song entered the French SNEP Singles Chart at number three on 17 November and remained for a total of 17 weeks in the top ten. On 26 January, after the performance on the show NRJ Music Award on TF1, the single reached a peak of number two but was unable to dethrone Star Academy's "La Musique (Angelica)" at the top of the chart. The single then dropped and totaled 23 weeks in the top 50 and 28 weeks in the top 100. Certified Gold by the SNEP one month after its release, "Les Mots" appeared respectively at number 32 and number 33 on the 2001 and 2002 French singles year end chart, as its chart trajectory overlapped the two years. As of August 2014, it is the 69th best-selling single of the 21st century in France, with 600,000 units sold.

On the Belgian (Wallonia) Ultratop 40 Singles Chart, the single went to number seven on 28 November and climbed to number two the next week, where it stayed for two weeks. It remained for 12 weeks in the top ten and 18 weeks in the top 40. Thus the single allowed Farmer to obtain one of her best chart performance in Belgium. The song was certified Gold and, as in France, it ranked in average positions on 2001 and 2002 Annual Singles Charts (respectively at number 36 and number 81), due to its release at the end of the year.

In March 2002, "Les Mots" was the most aired Francophone song in the world.

== Live performances and cover versions ==
There was only one television performance, during the 2002 NRJ Music Awards, broadcast on TF1 on 19 November 2001. "Les Mots" was also performed each evening during Farmer's concerts in 2006, but the drummer Abe Laboriel Jr. replaced Seal to sing the English verses. Both singers were dressed in black and sang next to each other, and in the background of the stage, they were shown behind a light drizzle on giant screens. Initially, Seal had been due to be present at the 13 concerts to sing with Farmer, but he asked for a too much money and was replaced.

The song was performed on the Timeless tour in 2013 as a duet with Gary Jules.

During the last three concerts of the Nevermore 2023/2024 tour at the Stade de France, Farmer sang the duet with Seal's personal contribution.

In 2003, the song was covered by the Swedish singers Christer Björkman and Shirley Clamp on their Swedish CD maxi. Their version is similar to the original.

== Formats and track listings ==
These are the formats and track listings of single releases of "Les Mots":

- CD single, 7" maxi

No.	Title	Length
1.	"Les Mots" (single version)	4:47
2.	"Les Mots" (strings for soul's mix)	4:44

- CD maxi – Europe, Israel, Canada

No.	Title	Length
1.	"Les Mots" (single version)	4:47
2.	"Les Mots" (strings for soul's mix)	4:44
3.	"L'Histoire d'une fée, c'est..."	5:00

- Digital download

No.	Title	Length
1.	"Les Mots" (album version)	4:44
2.	"Les Mots" (2006 live version)	5:06

- CD single – Promo / CD single – Promo – Luxurious edition

No.	Title	Length
1.	"Les Mots" (single version)	4:35

- VHS – Promo

No.	Title	Length
1.	"Les Mots" (video)	4:45

== Release history ==
Date	Label	Region	Format	Catalog
10 October 2001	Polydor	France, Belgium	CD single – Promo	9826
10 October 2001	Polydor	France, Belgium	VHS – Promo	—
13 November 2001	Polydor	France, Belgium	CD single	570 486–2
20 November 2001	Polydor	France, Belgium	7" maxi	570 486–1
2002	Polydor	Europe, Canada, Israel	CD maxi	570 702–2

== Official versions ==
Version	Length	Album	Remixed by	Year	Comment
Album version	4:45	Les Mots	—	2001	See the previous sections
Single version	4:47	—	—	2001	See the previous sections
Promotional version	4:40	—	—	2001	The noise of the match at the end is removed.
Strings for soul's mix	4:44	—	Laurent Boutonnat	2001	This version is almost sung a cappella, the music being played only by the violins. The noise of the match at the end is removed.
Music video	4:45	Music Videos IV	—	2001	
Live version (recorded in 2006)	5:06	Avant que l'ombre... à Bercy	—	2006	See Avant que l'ombre... à Bercy (tour)
Live version (recorded in 2013)	5:13	Timeless 2013	—	2013	See Timeless (tour). Performed as duet with Gary Jules.

== Credits and personnel ==
These are the credits and the personnel as they appear on the back of the single:

- Mylène Farmer – lyrics
- Laurent Boutonnat – music
- Requiem Publishing – editions
- Polydor – recording company
- Isabel Snyder / aRT miX the agency – photo
- Henry Neu / Com'N.B – design
- Made in the E.U.

== Charts and sales ==
=== Weekly charts ===
Weekly chart performance for "Les Mots"
Chart (2001–02)	Peak position
Belgium (Ultratop 50 Wallonia)	2
Canada (Nielsen SoundScan)	39
Europe (European Hot 100 Singles)	8
France (Airplay Chart)	2
France (SNEP)	2
Quebec (ADISQ)	39

=== Year-end charts ===
2001 year-end chart performance for "Les Mots"
Chart (2001)	Position
Belgium (Ultratop 50 Wallonia)	36
France (SNEP)	32

2002 year-end chart performance for "Les Mots"
Chart (2002)	Position
Belgium (Ultratop 50 Wallonia)	81
Europe (Eurochart Hot 100 Singles)	49
France (SNEP)	33

=== Certifications and sales ===
Country	Certification	Date	Sales certified	Physical sales
Belgium	Gold	7 January 2002	25,000	
France	Gold	19 December 2001	250,000	600,000 – 500,000-
