= Comme j'ai mal =

Single by Mylène Farmer

from the album Anamorphosée
- B-side: "Remix"
- Released: 1 July 1996
- Recorded: 1995
- Genre: Baroque pop
- Length: 3:50
- Label: Polydor
- Songwriters: Lyrics: Mylène Farmer; Music: Laurent Boutonnat
- Producer: Laurent Boutonnat

Mylène Farmer singles chronology
"California" (1996)	"Comme j'ai mal" (1996)	"Rêver" (1996)

Alternative cover
- CD maxi

"Comme j'ai mal" (English: "How Much I Suffer") is a 1996 song recorded by French singer-songwriter Mylène Farmer. Fourth single from her fourth album Anamorphosée, it was released on 1 July 1996. It was a relative failure: indeed, it failed to reach the top ten in France and was the least-selling single from the album.

== Background ==
In June 1996, Farmer continued her concert tour through France that she had begun on 25 May, while her fourth studio album Anamorphosée was a success despite a lack of promotion. However, on 15 June, the singer fell at her concert in Lyon and broke her wrist, forcing her to stop her tour. To make her fans wait, the release of "Comme j'ai mal", initially scheduled for August, was delayed to July, although no music video was shot then. The three official remixes available on the various formats were produced by Laurent Boutonnat and Bertrand Châtenet. As the previous single "California", a CD maxi was released in Germany. The song was later included in the studio version on the 2001 best of album Les Mots.

== Lyrics and music ==
Journalist Benoît Cachin said "Comme j'ai mal" seems to be as "a confession and may be related to the texts of "Ainsi soit je..." and "Laisse le vent emporter tout"". Farmer evokes "her pain of living that prevents her from enjoying life"; she also talks about her lucidity and disillusionment and "that leads her to disconnect both physically and psychologically from the real world for a better world that belongs to her". Author Erwan Chuberre considered that with this song, Farmer keeps up with lyrics "evoking death and the escape from reality". According to psychologist Hugues Royer, the song contains "the sign of a hope of change" of the malaise from childhood, "of a travel for the mind and the body".

== Music video ==
The music video was produced by Marcus Nispel, who had previously directed the ones for "XXL" and "L'Instant X", and later for "Souviens-toi du jour". Nispel also composed the screenplay alongside Farmer, and this video was generally regarded as his best. A Requiem Publishing production, the video was filmed in Los Angeles for two days in August 1996 with a budget of about 80,000 euros. It was said that the video was produced twice, as the scenery of the first one was ransacked by panthers that were originally included in the video. Only few photographs were taken by the only photographer who attended the shooting, Jeff Dahlgren, who also played in the 1992 film Giorgino. The costumes, make up and hairstyles required several hours of preparation. Farmer was deeply involved in the creation of the butterfly costume which holds itself through an iron wire and pins, and Farmer deemed it a masterpiece.

Mylène Farmer converted into a butterfly in the music video "Comme j'ai mal".

The video features Farmer at different stages of her life, and two actors who seem to be her parents. At the beginning, Farmer plays with a praying mantis in a cupboard. Then a little girl in a dark room opens a box containing many insects that she likes. When her father comes, she hides them in the box. She is then beaten by the latter who also starts to break everything in the room. With her doll and her box, the girl runs to take refuge in her cupboard where she plays with an insect. Then she eats sugar and gets covered with honey and finds herself in a cocoon in a forest. She begins to leave it, the sticky body with wings in the back, very long nails, ruffled hair. She has therefore converted into a butterfly whose face is that of Farmer. The father cries because he understands that his daughter is gone away.

The video was broadcast for the first time on television about one month after the single's release. According to French magazine Instant-Mag, this video underlines "the relationship with a father figure". "The girl, scared by her father, who hides in her cupboard, is the representation of a child beaten and mistreated. The most painful is the metaphor of Farmer converted into a butterfly, which has therefore no more than one day to live : allegory of a child injured in search of paradise ?" Royer considered this video proves the fact that "animals have something valuable to teach us. Something that we lost, and which undoubtedly relates to the survival instinct."

== Promotion and chart performance ==
On the television, Farmer performed "Comme j'ai mal" on the Tip Top show, broadcast on TF1 on 24 October 1996. Just after her performance, she sang "La Poupée qui fait non", a song originally composed by Michel Polnareff, as duet with Khaled. Regarding tours, the song was performed on the 1996 Live à Bercy tour; Farmer sang it alone in the middle of the stage illuminated by many lights. It was also performed on the Timeless tour in 2013.

"Comme j'ai mal"'s trajectories on the singles charts were rather disappointing in comparison with the previous three singles. In France, the single failed to enter the top ten, debuting at number 11 on 10 August 1996, then dropped and fell off the top 50 after nine weeks, becoming the lowest-selling single from the Anamorphosée album. On the Belgian Ultratop 50, "Comme j'ai mal" started at number 36 on 24 August, reached a peak at number 21 the next week, dropped quickly and totaled four weeks, which was the shortest chart run of a single from the album in Belgium.

== Formats and track listings ==
These are the formats and track listings of single releases of "Comme j'ai mal":

- CD single / CD single – Digipack / CD single – Promo – Digipack

No.	Title	Length
1.	"Comme j'ai mal" (single version)	3:50
2.	"Comme j'ai mal" (aches remix)	3:58

- CD maxi

No.	Title	Length
1.	"Comme j'ai mal" (single version)	3:50
2.	"Comme j'ai mal" (pain killer mix)	6:20
3.	"Comme j'ai mal" (upside down remix)	6:45
4.	"Comme j'ai mal" (instrumental)	3:50

- 12" maxi / 12" maxi – Promo

No.	Title	Length
1.	"Comme j'ai mal" (upside down remix)	6:45
2.	"Comme j'ai mal" (pain killer mix)	6:20

- Digital download

No.	Title	Length
1.	"Comme j'ai mal" (single version)	3:50
2.	"Comme j'ai mal" (1996 live version)	4:41

- CD single – Promo

No.	Title	Length
1.	"Comme j'ai mal" (single version)	3:50

- CD maxi – Promo – Germany

No.	Title	Length
1.	"Comme j'ai mal" (single version)	3:50
2.	"Comme j'ai mal" (aches remix)	3:58
3.	"Alice" (arachnostring version)	5:20

- Video – Promo

No.	Title	Length
1.	"Comme j'ai mal" (video)	4:00

== Release history ==
Date	Label	Region	Format	Catalog
July 1996	Polydor	France, Belgium, Switzerland	CD single – Promo	3378
July 1996	Polydor	France, Belgium, Switzerland	CD maxi – Promo	576 998-2
July 1996	Polydor	France, Belgium, Switzerland	12" maxi – Promo	6415
July 1996	Polydor	France, Belgium, Switzerland	VHS Promo	—
5 August 1996	Polydor	France, Belgium, Switzerland	CD single	576 998-2
5 August 1996	Polydor	France, Belgium, Switzerland	CD maxi	575 471-1
5 August 1996	Polydor	France, Belgium, Switzerland	12" maxi	575 471-7
October 1996	Polydor	Germany	CD maxi	576 999-2

== Official versions ==
Version	Length	Album	Remixed by	Year	Comment
Album version	3:53	Anamorphosée, Les Mots	—	1995	See the previous sections
Single version	3:50	—	—	1996	This version is similar to the album version.
Instrumental	3:50	—	Laurent Boutonnat	1996	All the lyrics are deleted.
Aches remix	3:58	—	Laurent Boutonnat	1996	This version has a new orchestration: percussions, guitars and chorus are added whereas and all strings are removed. The song ends abruptly, unlike the album version.
Pain killer mix	6:20	—	Laurent Boutonnat, Bertrand Châtenet	1996	It is similar to the 'Upside Down Remix', but slower and containing all the lyrics of the original version.
Upside down remix	6:45	—	Laurent Boutonnat, Bertrand Châtenet	1996	This is a techno and dance remix in which Farmer sings only "Je bascule" throughout the song.
Music video	4:00	Music Videos II, Music Videos II & III	—	1996	
Live version (recorded in 1996)	4:35 (audio); 4:18 (video)	Live à Bercy	—	1996	This live version is similar to that of the album, with a shorter introduction.See 1996 Tour

== Credits and personnel ==
These are the credits and the personnel as they appear on the back of the single:

- Mylène Farmer – lyrics
- Laurent Boutonnat – music
- Requiem Publishing – editions
- Polydor – recording company
- André Rau / Sygma – photo
- Com'N.B – design

== Charts ==
Chart (1996)	Peak position
Belgium (Ultratop 50 Wallonia)	21
Europe (European Hot 100 Singles)	46
France (SNEP)	11
Quebec (ADISQ)	18
