= Pardonne-moi (Mylène Farmer song) =

Single by Mylène Farmer

from the album Les Mots
- B-side: "Remix + instrumental"
- Released: 21 October 2002
- Recorded: 2001, France
- Genre: Pop, trip hop, ambient
- Length: 4:30
- Label: Polydor
- Songwriters: Lyrics: Mylène Farmer; Music: Laurent Boutonnat
- Producer: Laurent Boutonnat

Mylène Farmer singles chronology
"C'est une belle journée" (2002)	"Pardonne-moi" (2002)	"Fuck Them All" (2005)

"Pardonne-moi" (English: "Forgive Me") is a 2001 song recorded by French singer-songwriter Mylène Farmer, with lyrics written by herself and music composed by Laurent Boutonnat. It was the third and last single from Les Mots, and was released on 21 October 2002. The song is about the unhappy love of a woman who is asking for forgiveness from the Oriental princes whom she loves.

The black and white accompanying music video was directed by Boutonnat in Morocco and shows Farmer dressed as a nun, with images of a knight galloping on horseback and a snake. Like the single "À quoi je sers..." released thirteen years earlier, "Pardonne-moi" is generally deemed a synthesis of Farmer's work and thus marked the end of an artistic period in her career. The song received positive reviews from critics and became a top ten hit in France and in the Waloon Belgium, although its sales were rather disappointing.

== Background and release ==
After many hesitations, Polydor began sending promotional CDs to radio stations starting on 3 September 2002 before announcing the song's release as a single on 14 October. The song was finally released the following week. Unlike Farmer's previous songs "Les Mots" and "C'est une belle journée", as well as Kate Ryan's "Désenchantée" cover, "Pardonne-moi" was poorly broadcast on radio, although it enjoyed an extensive advertising campaign on TF1 and M6. The single was issued as CD single in a limited easel edition, and as 12" maxi with a run of 6,000 also copies containing another remix named 'forgiveness club remix'. There was no CD maxi.

== Lyrics and music ==
"Pardonne-moi" uses the imagery of a fairy tale. In the lyrics, Farmer cites various princes to whom she speaks: a Hungarian Prince, Hindu Prince, Arabic Prince, Dawn Prince, and Black Prince. French author Erwan Chuberre said that the lyrics deal with "a love that hurts, the one who was lost without knowing why" and refer to the film Lawrence of Arabia by David Lean. Author Julien Rigal stated that the song is about "the discharge of a woman in love many times neglected because of her too strong love". Journalist Benoît Cachin noted several references to Charles Perrault's fairy tale Sleeping Beauty (La Belle au Bois dormant or The Sleeping Beauty in the Wood). According to biographer Bernard Violet, "Pardonne-moi" has a "deliberately plaintive" music.

== Music video ==
The music video was directed by Laurent Boutonnat, and the screenplay of this Requiem Publishing and Stuffed Monkey production was written both by Mylène Farmer and Boutonnat. Some fans worried that the video would be the continuation of "C'est une belle journée", which was considered irrelevant given the quite different themes of both songs. As the song had several Oriental sonorities, several rumors about the video were divulged in the media, saying it would be filmed in Morocco during the singer's vacations in September 2002. The video was eventually shot in two days in Stains, France, and cost about 40,000 euros, making it one of the singer's least expensive videos. It features a horse, which gallops on a treadmill to give the impression that it does not move forward, and a snake, which belongs to Farmer, both of which were bought in Morocco.

The video was produced in black and white and deals with religion. It features Farmer, dressed as a nun, praying and sometimes performing a dance, surrounded by white smoke. Technically, the video is built on a rapid acceleration of images showing Farmer alternating with images of a closely filmed snake and of a mysterious knight on horseback whose running is accelerating throughout the video. During the refrain, Farmer begs forgiveness with a smoky light coming from above, the display alternating between white eyes and snake-like eyes.

In this video, "Boutonnat seems to sum up the features of Farmer's imagery: total harmony between photography, editing, and sound, but also haunting images at the expense of the narrative, like moments which are thrown on their own ambiance (...). The absence of colors and landscapes, and the several close ups inspire melancholy, almost dread. This feeling is accentuated by certain images of the singer engaged in an epileptic choreography, pretending to struggle in a smoke". Several elements of the video refer to visual effects already used in many of Farmer's previous videos: black and white ("À quoi je sers..."), eyes rolled upwards ("Tristana"), a snake ("Sans logique"), a moon ("Ainsi soit je..."), a horse through a cloud of smoke ("Allan"), some moving sails ("L'Âme-stram-gram"), a smoky camera ("Beyond My Control"), and a succession of zooms and close ups ("Maman a tort"). Thus, many observers saw in these references a conclusive aspect to this video and a summary of the singer's work, like "À quoi je sers..." (which featured characters from many of her earlier videos), 13 years earlier. In spite of these symbolic aspects, the music video was not greatly appreciated by the public because it was considered "too simple and too bland". Rigal deemed the video "aesthetic".

== Critical reception ==
"Pardonne-moi" was generally well received by the media. For example, French magazine Fan2 said the singer "uses ingredients that make her success: an enigmatic voice raised on somber and melancholy lyrics". The melody was described as "sweet and sad", with a "delightful and melancholy lyrics" by Star Club. Télé Magazine deemed that "Pardonne-moi" has an "effective melody", a "evanescent voice" and mysterious lyrics, which can be variously interpreted. Magazine Jukebox described it as a "melancholic" and "tortured" song.

== Chart performance ==
In France, "Pardonne-moi" entered the singles chart at a peak of number six on 26 October, becoming Farmer's 25th top ten hit. However, the single quickly dropped on the chart and totaled six weeks in the top 50 and seventeen weeks on the chart. In Belgium (Wallonia), the single debuted at number thirteen on 6 November on the Ultratop 50, then reached a peak at number seven the week after, and remained in the top 40 for eight weeks. It appeared at number 85 on the Belgian year-end chart. In Switzerland, "Pardonne-moi" debuted at number 53 on 11 November, then dropped and fell off the chart on 26 January 2003, but re-entered directly at a peak of number 45 and eventually totaled eleven weeks in the top 100.

== Formats and track listings ==
These are the formats and track listings of single releases of "Pardonne-moi":

- CD single / CD single – Tryptic

No.	Title	Length
1.	"Pardonne-moi" (single version)	4:30
2.	"Pardonne-moi" (dark side of the mix)	4:30
3.	"Pardonne-moi" (instrumental)	4:30

- 12" maxi

No.	Title	Length
1.	"Pardonne-moi" (forgiveness club remix)	6:30
2.	"Pardonne-moi" (single version)	4:30

- CD single – Promo / CD single – Promo – Luxurious limited edition (800)

No.	Title	Length
1.	"Pardonne-moi" (radio edit)	4:05

- VHS – Promo

No.	Title	Length
1.	"Pardonne-moi" (video)

== Official versions ==
Version	Length	Album	Remixed by	Year	Comment
Album / Single version	4:30	Les Mots	—	2001	See the previous sections
Radio edit	4:05	—	Laurent Boutonnat	2002	The musical bridge before the last refrain is shortened.
Instrumental version	4:30	—	Laurent Boutonnat	2002	This version is exactly similar to the album one, but all lyrics are removed, including background vocals.
Dark side of the mix	4:30	—	Bertrand Châtenet	2002	At the beginning, a languished voice can be heard.
Forgiveness club remix	6:30	—	Blue Planet Corporation and Taïa	2002	Devoted to the discothèques, this version has dance and techno sonorities.
Music video	4:15	Music Videos IV	—	2002	

== Credits and personnel ==
These are the credits and the personnel as they appear on the back of the single:

- Mylène Farmer – lyrics
- Laurent Boutonnat – music, production
- Bertrand Chatenet – mixing
- Requiem Publishing – edition
- Polydor – recording company
- Ellen Von Unwerth / H&K – photo
- Henry Neu / Com'N.B – design
- Made in the E.U.

== Charts ==
=== Peak positions ===
Chart (2002)	Peak position
Belgian (Wallonia) Singles Chart	7
Europe (European Hot 100 Singles)	21
French SNEP Singles Chart	6
French Airplay Chart	22
Swiss Singles Chart	45

=== Year-end charts ===
Chart (2002)	Position
Belgian (Wallonia) Singles Chart	85
French Singles Chart	—

=== Sales ===
Country	Certification	Physical sales
France	—	80,000 – 90,000

== Release history ==
Region	Date	Format
France, Belgium, Switzerland	3 September 2002	Promo CD single
France, Belgium, Switzerland	21 October 2002	CD single, 7" maxi
France, Belgium, Switzerland	October 2002	VHS
