= On est tous des imbéciles =

Single by Mylène Farmer
- B-side: "L'Annonciation"
- Released: February 1985
- Recorded: 1984
- Genre: Synthpop
- Length: 3:49 (single version); 6:14 (long version)
- Label: RCA / BMG Music
- Songwriter: Jérôme Dahan
- Producer: Jérôme Dahan

Mylène Farmer singles chronology
"Maman a tort" (1984)	"On est tous des imbéciles" (1985)	"Plus grandir" (1985)

Alternative cover
- promo biography paper with 7" single

"On est tous des imbéciles" (English: "We Are All Fools") is a 1984 song recorded by French artist Mylène Farmer. It was released in February 1985 as her second single after "Maman a tort" and its English-translated version "My Mum Is Wrong". Although the song was provocative and rather critical of show business, it was often well received in the media. However, in spite of good reviews and an intense promotion on television by the singer, the sales of the single were disappointing.

== Background and writing ==
After the moderate success of her first single "Maman a tort", Farmer decided to record a new song. Jerôme Dahan had already written some songs for her including "Be Bip Bou Rock'n Roll / L'Amour au téléphone" and "I Do Love You" which, however, were never released. "Be Bip Bou Rock'n Roll" was just recorded as a demo and Farmer said she often listened to this song. Finally, "On est tous des imbéciles" was released as a single under the RCA label. In an interview, Jérôme Dahan said that he wrote the song at the same time as "Maman a tort", when Farmer had not yet began her singing career. Dahan, who composed both the song's lyrics and music, remains the only songwriter to having entirely composed a song for Farmer. When he wrote the lyrics of "On est tous des imbéciles", Dahan thought he would be the singer of the song.

In addition to the two traditional media (12" single and 7" maxi), a promotional vinyl was sent to radio stations, which displayed an entirely red cover with the words "Mylène Farmer est une imbécile, et vous?" (Mylène Farmer is a fool, what about you?) written on it. No music video was produced at the time, because as explains by Dahan, "the television did not agree with the record companies for the rights on their airing".

Because of copyright issues, this song remains unavailable on any of Farmer's albums, including her first studio album Cendres de Lune, and her best of Les Mots. However, Farmer has apparently never disowned the song.

This single marked the end of the collaboration between the duo Farmer/Boutonnat and Jerôme Dahan, and also with RCA. François Dacla, then artistic director of the recording company, accepted the song in a contract that included only two singles with a requirement for success.

== Lyrics and music ==
On est tous des imbéciles
On est bien, très bien débiles
C'qui nous sauve c'est le style...

— Beginning of the chorus

About the song's title, Farmer said in an interview: "I don't know if this is really aggressive. This is certainly provocative and I always like to highlight the sentence that said "On est tous des imbéciles mais ce qui nous sauve c'est le style !" ("We are all fools, but what saves us is the style !") and I think that's right." According to author Erwan Chuberre, the song criticizes the "superficial side of the entertainment universe", with "rather strange lyrics playing on the self-mockery, accompanied by a music tinged of rhythms and bells". Author Alice Novak considered this song as very different from other ones that made the success of Farmer, although the singer showed through it that she had a sense of humor. In March 1985, Farmer explained: "This is a tongue-in-cheek song. This means that life should certainly not be taken seriously, that we need to laugh, and that derision is good."

In the song, Farmer "extracted her complexes by spreading the error on the human race". According to Télé Poche magazine, it has a "jazzy tone" and a "deep voice". In Farmer's career, the song is very original in many ways, as it was composed by someone outside of the Farmer / Boutonnat duo, in the music being very light, even a little simple, compared to Laurent Boutonnat's subsequent productions, and which the lyrics include "familiar and vulgar lyrics, which is not the case in Farmer's other songs in which she sublimates them systematically in figures more aesthetic, namely violence and eroticism, always put into words and images with delight and refinement". Considered as a "funny lampooner" and a "provocative" song which "disconcerted journalists and public", "On est tous des imbéciles" is about the artist profession and makes some cynical observations on it. It is a "virulent criticism from the environment of the show business where artists would be all fools". However, Farmer tackles strong themes that "have yet structured her musical work even to the point of becoming clichés". For example, she criticized the tendency of some artists to melancholy and romantic, and often exacerbated and vapid. "On est tous des imbéciles" "is proving to be a very enlightened song on the show-biz world in which many coincidences appear". Moreover, some observers noted several words that seem to refer to Jeanne Mas' universe, who was Farmer's great competitor at the time: evocation of style, ambiguity, dark atmosphere, sadness.

== Critical reception ==
"On est tous des imbéciles" was generally well received by contemporary pop music critics. For example, Boys and Girls said: "A new hit into perspective, and especially evidence that Mylène has real talent". Ici Paris praised the song, stating: ""On est tous des imbéciles" seems to confirm the talent of the trio [Boutonnat-Dahan-Farmer]". L'Est Républicain said: "This famous "On est tous des imbéciles" tastefully composed puts Farmer on the right track". Antenne considered the song as the "pleasant continuation of "Maman a tort"", and added that "this new production won't let anyone indifferent" and that "Mylène is in the process of confirming her talent". According to Numéro 1, "this new song has this little 'trick' that makes it almost essential". Salut! deemed the song as "pleasant, funny", La Voix du Nord considered that "the music is very rhythmic, almost jerky, the melody is stripped, the lyrics are disillusioned", and Chanson qualified the song as "salubrious". Jacinthe deemed "On est tous des imbéciles" a "provocative" song that "easily fits in the head as a success". As for Podium, it stated: "The melody is beautiful, Mylène's voice and tone are charming. Everything is very nice".

There was also some criticism. According to Le Matin, "this refrain is too heavily rhythmic", and to Nice Matin, "Mylène Farmer will have a hard time doing again a hit with this 'pretty' song".

"On est tous des imbéciles" was only released in France, and did not meet the same success as the previous single "Maman a tort", failing to reach the French SNEP Singles Chart (until 1998, it was only a top 50 hit). About 40,000 units were sold in 1985. Along with the singer's live singles, the song remains one of the lowest-selling single throughout Farmer's career. However, the two vinyl formats are today highly sought after by collectors, especially as this song and "L'Annonciation" are not included on Farmer's albums. In 1998, the value of the 7" reached about 1,500 euros, and the maxi vinyl's one 2,000 euros.

Explaining the reasons of the song's failure, journalist Benoît Cachin said that "the public does not join the second meaning of the lyrics" and that "the chorus also seems a bit "violent" to the listeners' ears". In addition, although the song's lyrics as well as Farmer conveyed the message that an artist should not considered himself seriously in his profession, critics deemed that Farmer's behavior did not comply with this message.

== Promotion and live performances ==
From April to December 1985, the singer actively promoted the song performing it in 19 French television shows broadcast on TF1, Antenne 2 and FR3, including Patatoès patatorum, Pour le plaisir, Jour J, Paris kiosque, L'Année du Zèbre, La Vie à plein temps, Platine 45, L'Écho des ados, Les Jeux de 20 Heures, Cadence 3, L'Académie des 9, 4C+, Zénith, Hit des clubs, Aujourd'hui la vie, Chanson témoin, Chanson miroir, La Grande Suite, La Clé des champs, C'est encore mieux l'après-midi, Super Platine, Eurexporythmes and Ring parade. On these occasions, she performed a choreography which author Erwan Chuberre qualified as one of the "most astounding uncoordinated dance[s]"; however, Cachin considered that Farmer was smiling then and appeared more at ease than when she promoted her previous single.

The song was never performed on tours.

== B-side: "L'Annonciation" ==
The vinyl's B-side contains another new song, "L'Annonciation". The title refers to the Archangel Gabriel announcing to the Virgin Mary that she is pregnant. The song is dedicated to St. Theresa of Avilla, a Spanish Catholic nun of the sixteenth century, as the singer was fascinated by this saint at the time, and to Farmer's father because of the religious education he gave to her.

"L'Annonciation" was the first song to be entirely composed by Laurent Boutonnat. It has "obscure lyrics" and "is disturbing in more than one way", according to journalist Caroline Bee. It deals with the issues of rape and abortion, but incest and mystical possession may also be possible meanings of this song. The music is throbbing, moving and melancholy, with a musical background from the Romany folklore using many violins and cellos. Farmer said in an interview that she had cried a lot when she recorded the song.

The song was never performed on tours and does not appear on any album.

== Formats and track listings ==
These are the formats and track listings of single releases of "On est tous des imbéciles":

- 7" single

No.	Title	Length
1.	"On est tous des imbéciles" (single version)	3:49
2.	"L'Annonciation"	4:07

- 7" maxi

No.	Title	Length
1.	"On est tous des imbéciles" (long version)	6:14
2.	"L'Annonciation"	4:07

== Official versions ==
Version	Length	Remixer	Year	Comment
Single version	3:49	—	1985	See the previous sections
Long version	6:14	Jérôme Dahan	1985	This version, also composed by Jérôme Dahan, includes a 1:30 introduction mainly composed of drum machines. A long instrumental passage is played on the piano. A new chorus and a passage almost a cappella with the choristers are added in this extended version.

== Credits and personnel ==
These are the credits and the personnel as they appear on the back of the single:

- Jérôme Dahan – lyrics, music, producer
- E. Persin /RCA – demo
- Recording at "Le matin calme" studio
- Hervé Le Coz – mixing
- Bertrand Le Page – editions, management
- RCA – recording company
- Schachmes / Sygma – photo
- Valérie Pozzo – design
- Laurent Boutonnat – producer

== Release history ==
Region	Date	Format
France	February 1985	7" single, 7" maxi
