= C'est une belle journée =

Single by Mylène Farmer

from the album Les Mots
- Released: 16 April 2002
- Recorded: 2001, France
- Genre: Folk rock, trip hop
- Length: 4:10
- Label: Polydor
- Songwriters: Lyrics: Mylène Farmer; Music: Laurent Boutonnat
- Producer: Laurent Boutonnat

Mylène Farmer singles chronology
"Les Mots" (2001)	"C'est une belle journée" (2002)	"Pardonne-moi" (2002)

"C'est une belle journée" (English: "It's a Beautiful Day") is a 2001 song recorded by French singer-songwriter Mylène Farmer. It was the second single from her best of Les Mots and was released on 16 April 2002. The song contains melancholy lyrics set to dance music and was illustrated by a cartoon video produced by Farmer's boyfriend. It achieved great success in France where it remained ranked for several months on the top 50.

== Background and release ==
In February 2002, Universal and Stuffed Monkey decided to release "C'est une belle journée", one of the three unreleased songs from the compilation Les Mots and officially announced it in March. However, due to the huge success of the single "Les Mots", recorded as duet with Seal, the new single was not released until April 2002. The promotional CD single was sent to radio stations on 4 March 2002, then the promotional vinyl on 28 March 2002. There were three versions of the CD single : one is supple, the second is thick, the third is a picture disc.

Several remixes were produced on the three media (CD single, CD maxi, 12" maxi): 'elegie's club remix ', by Blue Planet Corporation, 'such a beautiful day's remix' and 'beauty and bed remix', by StarCity, 'what a souci's remix', by Tom Novy. Another remix was only available on the German Promotional CD single, 'elegie's remix club radio edit', also by Blue Planet Corporation. In 2004, a new remix was made by Devis Head, engineered by Jérôme Devoise at Studio Guillaume Tell, in Paris. Two other maxi CDs were released in Germany and Canada, with the same track listings as the French one, but with a crystal case. The promotional CD contains two white feathers : one on the cover (at the end of the word "journée"), the other inside. The photography was directed by Ellen von Unwerth, and the cover design was made by Henry Neu.

As for her other singles, Mylène Farmer wrote the lyrics and Laurent Boutonnat composed the music. About the lyrics, Farmer, interviewed by TF1, confessed to have changed the words of the chorus afterthought. Initially, "C'est une belle journée, je vais me tuer", which could be taken as an incitement to suicide by vulnerable people, was replaced in the end with "C'est une belle journée, je vais me coucher".

Jean-Claude Déquéant, who composed "Libertine" for Farmer in 1986, said he had "great admiration" for "C'est une belle journée".

== Music and lyrics ==
C'est une belle journée
Je vais me coucher
Une si belle journée
Qui s'achève...

— Beginning of the chorus

In this song, Farmer talks about "her irresistible need to see the bad side of things, contrary to most people". This song is very similar in its structure to "Je t'aime mélancolie" : indeed, the two songs have heavy dance sounds and deal with the same gloomy themes. Concerning the lyrics, death and religious references are present, including the angels in the refrain.

Expert of French charts Élia Habib considered that "C'est une belle journée" "has an intro worthy of a 1980s opus of Pet Shop Boys" and said it "is a song with a tempo surprisingly cheerful"; however, he maintained: "Under this cover unusual are concealed again recurring themes of the Farmer anthology: death, nostalgia, vision of a world torn between good and evil, brevity of life". To author Erwan Chuberre, "C'est une belle journée" is "a catchy and joyful song at the first hearing but that turns out to be, finally, rather dark", and has "a lot of irony and humor". According to French magazine Instant-Mag, "we find [in this song] all Farmer and Boutonnat's art of the beautiful time, namely involve very delicately melancholy lyrics and skipping music, or even a bit commercial". "Apology of suicide, sleep, pessimism, departure", the song is "a call to sacrifice, to let go, to flee to a world of spiritual and physical peace". "Behind the joyful and optimistic notes of the song, we can perceive stenchs much less happy and much more ambiguous. Farmer is in a pessimistic perspective, referring to the death behind the apparent sleep, the emptiness instead of the full, the completion instead of the beginning, and the flight as a reunion." There is also a parallel with Le Dormeur du val, written by French poet Arthur Rimbaud.

About the lyrics, Farmer said: "It would be indecent to directly address the topic of suicide. Too easy. Because I am protected by my family circle, by this success that gives me some strength. Those who listen to me do not always have them, that security." However, as noted by psychologist Hugues Royer, suicide evoked in the lyrics is intended to relieve a too heavy sadness, but to avoid, paradoxically, the horizon of a possible happiness.

== Music video ==
The character drawn by Mylène Farmer and which represents her in the music video for "C'est une belle journée"

On the Internet, some fans asserted that the videoclip would be released as a digipack DVD in a limited edition and would contain the making of. There are also rumors about the fact that the video would be produced from the singer's drawings – and that was right -, as it had done for the CD maxi and vinyl's covers for "Dessine-moi un mouton".

Finally, for the first time in the star's career, the video, directed by Benoît Di Sabatino, was produced as a cartoon film. Shot in Paris, it cost about 120,000 euros. As always, it was a Requiem Publishing and Stuffed Monkey production, and the screenplay was written by Farmer. The music video was announced in the media.

In addition to Farmer, the video features a young girl, Lisa, who has already appeared on the cover of the second Marc Levy novel, Où es-tu ?, a sheep already seen on "Dessine-moi un mouton"'s cover, a spider (initially created for the program of the 1996 concert tour) and a rat, in a childish style. There are several references to Le Petit Prince, a 1943 Antoine de Saint-Exupéry novella.

At the beginning of the video, we see a bare tree and maple leaves flying. A slender young woman (Farmer) begins the day doing some stretches on her bed with the sheep bouncing on her stomach. Inadvertently, she kicks her sheep and looks for it around her as a rat in a toy car drives by. Then while she is bathing, a spider appears in a thought bubble. The sheep eats a bar of soap, hiccups, finds itself in a bubble and falls in the bathtub. Then, at noon, Farmer encloses the sheep in her refrigerator. She sits on it and swings her legs to the rhythm of the clock's hands which go round very quickly. Farmer then juggles with her frozen sheep. In the afternoon, she goes and sits on her bed, plays with a spider and seems to be very sad. Suddenly, a young child appears at the door, hung by her feet. She plays with a ball and flies to the tree. Farmer looks at her for a while, and eventually follows her. There the child dances and plays leapfrog with the sheep. The child, the sheep, the rat in its car, maple leaves, and some words fly by in a whirlwind. At the end of the day, Farmer lies down with the sheep and the video ends with a mention "To be continued".

According to some analyses, the video emphasizes melancholy and nostalgia. In this context, the dead tree could illustrate the faded beauty of the world, the spider would be the personification of the singer's black thoughts, while the sheep would represent Farmer's lost dreams and deepest disillusionment. The clock's hands going round quickly are likely to illustrate the time gap between physical and mental time. As for the little girl, she would represent Farmer when she was younger and carefree. The fact that the child was hung by the feet at a certain time might refer to Œdipus, but also to Farmer's song "Jardin de Vienne" in which a child finds freedom by hanging. However, the final words of the video leave a glimmer of hope.

== Chart performance ==
Like "Les Mots", this song is one of the few Farmer singles to have a long trajectory on French SNEP Singles Chart, thus proving it has won over the general public. It debuted at a peak of number five on 20 April and remained for ten weeks in the top 20, thanks to numerous broadcasts by various radio stations. The single fell off the chart after 25 weeks on 5 October. Certified Gold disc five months after its release by the SNEP for over 200,000 units, "C'est une belle journée" peaked at number thirty-eight in the 2002 French singles year end chart, five positions behind the former single "Les Mots".

In Belgium (Wallonia), the single started at number 20 on the Ultratop 50 Singles Chart on 1 May, then jumped to a peak of number 11. It stabilized for the next seven weeks in the top 20, and stayed in the chart until 7 August. It was the 51st best-selling single on the 2002 Belgian Singles Chart, ahead of Farmer's two other singles released that year: "Les Mots" (number 81) and "Pardonne-moi" (number 85).

== Live performances and cover versions ==
Mylène Farmer performing "C'est une belle journée" on Zidane Ela show.

Farmer performed the song in playback in two television programs: first, Farmer sang "C'est une belle journée" on 27 April on the nationally acclaimed show Hit Machine on M6; then, she performed the song on Zidane Ela, broadcast on France 2 on 19 May. For the first and only time, she appeared in the trailer, announcing her own performance in the broadcast (the fact that the singer sang that day for a humanitarian cause may have been a factor). At the end of the song, feathers were released on the set. As noted by Instant-Mag, these performances were conducted with a great deal of relaxation. The choreography, "fluid, joyful" and carried out with two female dancers, "was much less ceremonial than that of "L'Âme-stram-gram"", and Farmer was smiling more than usual. At each performance, she wore a hat on her head.

The song was performed during the 2006 tour. When the song started, the letters CUBJ (the acronym of "C'est une belle journée"), then drawings from the music video, appeared on giant screens in the back of the stage. Farmer and her dancers performed an original and dynamic choreography, then the singer approached the audience and sat down.

It was also performed on the Timeless tour in 2013 and on the Nevermore tour in 2023.

In 2003, the single was covered by French singers MC Solaar, Alain Souchon and Jean-Louis Aubert, during the Les Enfoirés tour. Their version is available on the album La Foire aux Enfoirés.

== Formats and track listings ==
These are the formats and track listings of single releases of "C'est une belle journée":

- CD single

No.	Title	Length
1.	"C'est une belle journée" (single version)	4:10
2.	"C'est une belle journée" (instrumental)	4:15

- CD maxi – Digipack / CD maxi – Canada, Germany

No.	Title	Length
1.	"C'est une belle journée" (single version)	4:10
2.	"C'est une belle journée" (elegie's remix club)	7:10
3.	"C'est une belle journée" (such a beautiful day's remix)	8:05
4.	"C'est une belle journée" (what a souci's remix)	4:10

- 7" maxi / 7" maxi – Picture disc / 7" maxi – Promo

No.	Title	Length
1.	"C'est une belle journée" (belle and bed remix)	8:10
2.	"C'est une belle journée" (elegie's remix club)	7:10

- Digital download

No.	Title	Length
1.	"C'est une belle journée" (album version)	4:15
2.	"C'est une belle journée" (2006 live version)	8:21
3.	"C'est une belle journée" (Devil Head remix)	5:10

- CD single – Promo / CD single – Promo – Luxurious edition

No.	Title	Length
1.	"C'est une belle journée" (radio edit)	4:00

- CD single – Promo – Germany

No.	Title	Length
1.	"C'est une belle journée" (single version)	4:10
2.	"C'est une belle journée" (elegie's remix club radio edit)	3:42

- VHS – Promo

No.	Title	Length
1.	"C'est une belle journée" (video)	4:12

== Release history ==
Date	Label	Region	Format	Catalog
7 March 2002	Polydor	France, Belgium	CD single – Promo	9984
7 March 2002	Polydor	France, Belgium	7" maxi – Promo	0403
7 March 2002	Polydor	France, Belgium	VHS – Promo	—
7 March 2002	Polydor	Germany	CD single – Promo	—
16 April 2002	Polydor	France, Belgium	CD single – Promo	570 734-2
16 April 2002	Polydor	France, Belgium	CD maxi – Promo	570 735-2
16 April 2002	Polydor	France, Belgium	7" maxi – Promo	570 734-1
2003	Polydor	Europe, Canada	CD maxi	570 735-2

== Official versions ==
Version	Length	Album	Remixed by	Year	Comment
Album version	4:10	Les Mots	—	2001	See the previous sections
Single version	4:15	—	—	2001	This version is similar to the album one.
Radio edit	4:00	—	—	2001	The last refrain is deleted.
Instrumental	4:15	—	Laurent Boutonnat	2002	This version is the same as that of the album, but all lyrics are removed, including background vocals.
Elegie's remix club	7:10	—	Blue Planet Corporation	2002	This is a dance remix which contains all of the lyrics from the original version, but some "C'est une belle journée" and "Donne l'envie d'aimer" in a sampled version are added throughout the song.
Such a beautiful day's remix	8:05	—	StarCity	2002	This house version has a musical introduction which lasts two minutes.
What a souci's remix	4:10	—	Tom Novy	2002	This is a dance and techno remix in which many percussion are used.
Belle and bed remix	8:07	—	StarCity	2002	This remix is almost identical to "Such a Beautiful Day's Remix", except with slightly different vocal arrangements.
Elegie's remix club radio edit	3:35	—	Blue Planet Corporation	2002	This is the same version than 'Elegie's Remix Club', but shorter.
Music video	4:15	Music Videos IV	—	2002	
Devil Head remix	5:10	RemixeS	Devil Head	2002	This is a techno remix in which Farmer's voice is put forward.
Live version (recorded in 2006)	8:21 (audio); 9:14 (video)	Avant que l'ombre... à Bercy	—	2006	See Avant que l'ombre... à Bercy (tour)
Live version (recorded in 2013)	6:17 (audio)	Timeless		2013	See Timeless (Mylène Farmer)

== Credits and personnel ==
These are the credits and the personnel as they appear on the back of the single:

- Mylène Farmer – lyrics
- Laurent Boutonnat – music
- Requiem Publishing – editions
- Polydor – recording company
- Ellen Von Unwerth / H&K – photo
- Henry Neu / Com'N.B – design
- Made in the E.U.

== Charts ==
=== Weekly charts ===
Chart (2002)	Peak position
Belgian (Wallonia) Singles Chart	11
Europe (European Hot 100 Singles)	22
French SNEP Singles Chart	5

=== Year-end charts ===
Chart (2002)	Position
Belgian (Wallonia) Singles Chart	51
French Singles Chart	38
French Airplay Chart	44
French TV Airplay Chart	40

== Certifications and sales ==
Region	Certification	Certified units/sales
France (SNEP)	Gold	250,000
