= Les Mots (album) =

Les mots

Greatest hits album by Mylène Farmer
- Released: 26 November 2001
- Genres: Pop, rock, dance
- Length: 139:59
- Label: Polydor
- Producer: Laurent Boutonnat

Mylène Farmer chronology
| Mylenium Tour (2000) | Les mots (2001) | RemixeS (2003) |

Alternative cover
- Long box (limited edition)

Singles from Les mots
- 1. "L'Histoire d'une fée, c'est..." Released: 27 February 2001; 2. "Les mots" Released: 13 November 2001; 3. "C'est une belle journée" Released: 16 April 2002; 4. "Pardonne-moi" Released: 21 October 2002

Les mots is the first compilation by French singer Mylène Farmer, released on 26 November 2001. It contains most of the singer's hits and three new songs. It was certified diamond in France.

== Background and release ==
In 2001, rumours circulated that Farmer's next album would be another remix compilation, or acoustic reworkings of her hits. Instead, Les mots was announced as a typical best of, preceded by the release of the single of the same name, Farmer's first duet with an international artist. The album was released throughout Europe on 28 November 2001.

The album includes nearly all of Farmer's French-language studio singles from "Maman a tort" through "L'Histoire d'une fée, c'est...", omitting "On est tous des imbéciles" (due to licensing issues). "My Mum Is Wrong", the English version of "Maman a tort", is also excluded, while "My Soul Is Slashed", the English version of "Que mon cœur lâche", appears only on the collector's edition. The live singles "Allan" and "La Poupée qui fait non" are likewise excluded. It also contains several B-sides (two on the standard edition, four on the deluxe; "L'Annonciation" and "Dernier sourire" were also omitted due to licensing issues) and three new songs. The standard 2CD edition totals 30 tracks, while the 3CD collector's edition totals 33, plus a DVD including the title track's music video.

The booklet includes photographs of Farmer in suggestive positions wearing pearly stockings, pink panties and a silk nightgown, taken from a photoshoot by Ellen von Unwerth on a budget of €67,000. Notably, Farmer is seen smiling and laughing in the photos, unlike in previous shoots.

== Critical reception ==
Professional ratings
Review scores
| Source | Rating |
|---|---|
| Allmusic | link |
| Fnac | link |
| Amazon.fr | link |

Les mots was generally well received by contemporary musical critics and media. According to La Libre Belgique, the Farmer's work is "synthesized in a superb way" in this album. This compilation also "gives an idea of the real musical evolution" of the artist. The Swiss newspaper Le Matin described this album as "a superb compilation" and "a 'must' in the matter", containing "many hits", with "provocative" images. The French magazine Flèches Cool said that this album is an "imposing best of with 27 tracks, all very well known and appreciated by a wide public". Télé Star praised the first CD, saying it contains hits with "unstoppable melody", "flights of strings", and "tortured or sexy words", while it criticized the second CD, that "testifies the frayed inspiration of the singer". As for Voici, "this double album stands out".

== Commercial performance ==
The album reached the highest position in France and Belgium since its release. According to France Soir and La Lanterne, 670,000 copies of this album were sold in the first month in France, and 700,000 in the two first months, according to Jukebox.

In France, the best of debuted at #1 on Top Compilations on 1 December 2001 and remained there for 6 consecutive weeks. It appeared in the Top 10 for 39 weeks. It was ranked on this chart over one year, thanks to the release of the two new songs "C'est une belle journée" and "Pardonne-moi". It was the best-selling compilation in 2001 and 2002.

In Belgium, the album went straight to #2 on 12 December 2001, and then became number 1 for four weeks. It remained in the Top 10 for 15 weeks and in the Top 40 for 43 weeks. The album featured at #28 and #14 on the 2001 and 2002 end of year chart.

In Switzerland, the album got its highest position when it entered at # 6, on 12 December 2001, and remained on the chart (Top 100) for 38 weeks.

The best of won the World Platinum Award. It was certified Diamond in France, 2×Platinum in Belgium, and Gold in Switzerland.

== Track listing ==
=== Standard edition ===
CD 1 / Cassette side A
| No. | Title | Lyrics | Music | Original album | Length |
|---|---|---|---|---|---|
| 1. | "Maman a tort" (mix 2001) | Jérôme Dahan | Laurent Boutonnat | Cendres de lune |
| 2. | "Plus grandir" (mix 2001) | Mylène Farmer | Boutonnat | Cendres de lune |
| 3. | "Libertine" (mix 2001) | Boutonnat | Jean-Claude Dequéant | Cendres de lune |
| 4. | "Tristana" | Farmer | Boutonnat | Cendres de lune |
| 5. | "Sans contrefaçon" (mix 2001) | Farmer | Boutonnat | Ainsi soit je... |
| 6. | "Ainsi soit-je..." (mix 2001) | Farmer | Boutonnat | Ainsi soit je... |
| 7. | "Pourvu qu'elles soient douces" | Farmer | Boutonnat | Ainsi soit je... |
| 8. | "Sans logique" (mix 2001) | Farmer | Boutonnat | Ainsi soit je... |
| 9. | "À quoi je sers..." | Farmer | Boutonnat | À quoi je sers... [single] |
| 10. | "La Veuve noire" | Farmer | Boutonnat | À quoi je sers... [single] |
| 11. | "Désenchantée" (mix 2001) | Farmer | Boutonnat | L'autre... |
| 12. | "Regrets" (duet with Jean-Louis Murat) | Farmer | Boutonnat | L'autre... |
| 13. | "Je t'aime mélancolie" (mix 2001) | Farmer | Boutonnat | L'autre... |
| 14. | "Beyond My Control" | Farmer | Boutonnat | L'autre... |
| 15. | "Que mon cœur lâche" | Farmer | Boutonnat | Que mon cœur lâche [single] |

CD 2 / Cassette side B
| No. | Title | Lyrics | Music | Original album | Length |
|---|---|---|---|---|---|
| 1. | "Les mots" (duet with Seal) | Farmer | Boutonnat | Previously unreleased |
| 2. | "California" | Farmer | Boutonnat | Anamorphosée |
| 3. | "XXL" | Farmer | Boutonnat | Anamorphosée |
| 4. | "L'Instant X" | Farmer | Boutonnat | Anamorphosée |
| 5. | "Comme j'ai mal" | Farmer | Boutonnat | Anamorphosée |
| 6. | "Rêver" | Farmer | Boutonnat | Anamorphosée |
| 7. | "C'est une belle journée" | Farmer | Boutonnat | Previously unreleased |
| 8. | "L'Âme-stram-gram" | Farmer | Boutonnat | Innamoramento |
| 9. | "Je te rends ton amour" | Farmer | Boutonnat | Innamoramento |
| 10. | "Effets secondaires" | Farmer | Boutonnat | Je te rends ton amour [single] |
| 11. | "Souviens-toi du jour" | Farmer | Boutonnat | Innamoramento |
| 12. | "Optimistique-moi" | Farmer | Farmer | Innamoramento |
| 13. | "Innamoramento" | Farmer | Boutonnat | Innamoramento |
| 14. | "L'Histoire d'une fée, c'est..." | Farmer | Boutonnat | Les Razmokets à Paris |
| 15. | "Pardonne-moi" | Farmer | Boutonnat | Previously unreleased |

=== Collector's edition ===
This edition moves the new recordings and B-sides to the third disc, along with two additional B-sides and an additional single.

CD 1
| No. | Title | Lyrics | Music | Original album | Length |
|---|---|---|---|---|---|
| 1. | "Maman a tort" (mix 2001) | Jérôme Dahan | Laurent Boutonnat | Cendres de lune |
| 2. | "Plus grandir" (mix 2001) | Mylène Farmer | Boutonnat | Cendres de lune |
| 3. | "Libertine" (mix 2001) | Boutonnat | Jean-Claude Dequéant | Cendres de lune |
| 4. | "Tristana" | Farmer | Boutonnat | Cendres de lune |
| 5. | "Sans contrefaçon" (mix 2001) | Farmer | Boutonnat | Ainsi soit je... |
| 6. | "Ainsi soit je..." (mix 2001) | Farmer | Boutonnat | Ainsi soit je... |
| 7. | "Pourvu qu'elles soient douces" | Farmer | Boutonnat | Ainsi soit je... |
| 8. | "Sans logique" (mix 2001) | Farmer | Boutonnat | Ainsi soit je... |
| 9. | "À quoi je sers..." | Farmer | Boutonnat | À quoi je sers... [single] |
| 10. | "Désenchantée" (mix 2001) | Farmer | Boutonnat | L'autre... |
| 11. | "Regrets" (duet with Jean-Louis Murat) | Farmer | Boutonnat | L'autre... |
| 12. | "Je t'aime mélancolie" (mix 2001) | Farmer | Boutonnat | L'autre... |
| 13. | "Beyond My Control" | Farmer | Boutonnat | L'autre... |
| 14. | "Que mon cœur lâche" | Farmer | Boutonnat | Que mon cœur lâche [single] |

CD 2
| No. | Title | Lyrics | Music | Original album | Length |
|---|---|---|---|---|---|
| 1. | "California" | Farmer | Boutonnat | Anamorphosée |
| 2. | "XXL" | Farmer | Boutonnat | Anamorphosée |
| 3. | "L'Instant X" | Farmer | Boutonnat | Anamorphosée |
| 4. | "Comme j'ai mal" | Farmer | Boutonnat | Anamorphosée |
| 5. | "Rêver" | Farmer | Boutonnat | Anamorphosée |
| 6. | "L'Âme-stram-gram]" | Farmer | Boutonnat | Innamoramento |
| 7. | "Je te rends ton amour" | Farmer | Boutonnat | Innamoramento |
| 8. | "Souviens-toi du jour" | Farmer | Boutonnat | Innamoramento |
| 9. | "Optimistique-moi" | Farmer | Farmer | Innamoramento |
| 10. | "Innamoramento" | Farmer | Boutonnat | Innamoramento |
| 11. | "L'Histoire d'une fée, c'est..." |

CD 3
| No. | Title | Lyrics | Music | Original release | Length |
|---|---|---|---|---|---|
| 1. | "Les Mots" (duet with Seal) | Farmer | Boutonnat | Previously unreleased |
| 2. | "C'est une belle journée" | Farmer | Boutonnat | Previously unreleased |
| 3. | "Pardonne-moi" | Farmer | Boutonnat | Previously unreleased |
| 4. | "La Veuve noire" | Farmer | Boutonnat | À quoi je sers [single] |
| 5. | "Mylène Is Calling" | Farmer | Boutonnat | Je t'aime mélancolie [single] |
| 6. | "Effets secondaires" | Farmer | Boutonnat | Je te rends ton amour [single] |
| 7. | "Puisque..." | Farmer | Boutonnat | Pourvu qu'elles soient douces [single] |
| 8. | "My Soul Is Slashed" | Farmer | Boutonnat | Que mon cœur lâche [international version] |

DVD
| No. | Title | Length |
|---|---|---|
| 1. | "Les Mots" ((duet with Seal) (music video)) |

=== International edition ===
Les Mots international edition track listing
| No. | Title | Lyrics | Music | Original album | Length |
|---|---|---|---|---|---|
| 1. | "Les Mots" | Mylène Farmer | Laurent Boutonnat | Previously unreleased |
| 2. | "Sans contrefaçon" (mix 2001) | Farmer | Boutonnat | Ainsi soit je... |
| 3. | "Libertine" (mix 2001) | Boutonnat | Jean-Claude Dequéant | Cendres de lune |
| 4. | "Pourvu qu'elles soient douces" | Farmer | Boutonnat | Ainsi soit je... |
| 5. | "Désenchantée" (mix 2001) | Farmer | Boutonnat | L'autre... |
| 6. | "Je t'aime mélancolie" (mix 2001) | Farmer | Boutonnat | L'autre... |
| 7. | "California" | Farmer | Boutonnat | Anamorphosée |
| 8. | "XXL" | Farmer | Boutonnat | Anamorphosée |
| 9. | "L'Instant X" | Farmer | Boutonnat | Anamorphosée |
| 10. | "Rêver" | Farmer | Boutonnat | Anamorphosée |
| 11. | "L'Âme-stram-gram" | Farmer | Boutonnat | Innamoramento |
| 12. | "Je te rends ton amour" | Farmer | Boutonnat | Innamoramento |
| 13. | "Souviens-toi du jour" | Farmer | Boutonnat | Innamoramento |
| 14. | "Innamoramento" | Farmer | Boutonnat | Innamoramento |
| 15. | "C'est une belle journée" | Farmer | Boutonnat | Previously unreleased |
| 16. | "Pardonne-moi" | Farmer | Boutonnat | Previously unreleased |

== Personnel ==
- Produced by Laurent Boutonnat
- Mixed by Bertrand Châtenet
  - Except: "Maman a tort": Philippe Omnes; "Tristana", "Sans contrefaçon", "Ainsi soit je...", "Pourvu qu'elles soient douces", "Sans logique", "À quoi je sers...", "La Veuve noire", "Désenchantée", "Regrets", "Je t'aime mélancolie", "Beyond My Control" and "Que mon cœur lâche"
- Programmation, keyboards and arrangement for "Les Mots", "C'est une belle journée", "Pardonne-moi": Laurent Boutonnat
- Sound: Bertrand Châtenet, Jérôme Devoise and Rik Pekkonen
- Strings arrangement: Jean-Jacques Charles
- Drum kit: Karim Ziad and Abraham Laboriel Jr
- Bass: Michel Alibo
- Guitar: Slim Pezin
- Recorded at Studio Guillaume Tell, Paris
- Management: Thierry Suc for TSM
- Executive production: Paul Van Parys for Stuffed Monkey
- Photographs: Ellen Von Unwerth / H&K
- Design: Henry Neu for Com'N.B
- Mastering: André Perriat, Top Master
- Lyrics: Mylène Farmer
  - Except: "Maman a tort": Jérôme Dahan; "Libertine": Laurent Boutonnat
- Music: Laurent Boutonnat
  - Except: "Maman a tort": Laurent Boutonnat and Jérôme Dahan; "Libertine": Jean-Claude Déquéant; "Optimistique-moi": Mylène Farmer
- Editions : Requiem Publishing
  - Except: "Maman a tort": Cezame / BMG Music Publishing France; "Plus grandir", "Libertine", "Tristana", "Sans contrefaçon", "Ainsi soit je...", "Pourvu qu'elles soient douces", "Sans logique", "À quoi je sers...", "La Veuve noire" : Universal Music Publishing / BMG Music Publishing France

== Charts ==
=== Weekly charts ===
| Chart (2001) | Peak position |
|---|---|
| Belgian Albums (Ultratop Wallonia) | 1 |
| European Albums (Music & Media) | 98 |
| French Compilations (SNEP) | 1 |
| Swiss Albums (Schweizer Hitparade) | 6 |
| Greek Albums (IFPI) | 18 |

=== Year-end charts ===
| Chart (2001) | Position |
|---|---|
| Belgian Albums (Ultratop Wallonia) | 28 |
| Belgian Francophone Albums (Ultratop Wallonia) | 15 |
| French Compilations (SNEP) | 1 |
| Chart (2002) | Position |
| Belgian Albums (Ultratop Wallonia) | 14 |
| Belgian Francophone Albums (Ultratop Wallonia) | 10 |
| French Compilations (SNEP) | 1 |
| Swiss Albums (Schweizer Hitparade) | 55 |
| Chart (2003) | Position |
| French Compilations (SNEP) | 4 |

== Certifications and sales ==
| Region | Certification | Certified units/sales |
|---|---|---|
| Belgium (BRMA) | 2× Platinum | 100,000^{*} |
| France (SNEP) | Diamond | 1,500,000 |
| Switzerland (IFPI Switzerland) | Gold | 20,000^{^} |
Summaries
| Europe (IFPI) | Platinum | 1,000,000^{*} |
| Worldwide | — | 2,000,000 |
^{*} Sales figures based on certification alone.^{^} Shipments figures based on certification alone.

== Formats ==
- Double CD – Crystal case
- Double CD – Digipack – Limited edition (100,000)
- Cassette 1 – Double length
- Cassette 2 – Double length
- Quadruple LP
- Collector edition – Long Box 3 CD + 1 DVD – Limited edition (30,000) (1)
- CD – European version (2)
- Double CD – Digipack – Promo
- Cassette 1 – Double length – Promo
- Cassette 2 – Double length – Promo
- Collector edition – Long Box 3 CD + 1 DVD – Promo (1)

(1) Contains also a third CD
(2) Only one CD with 16 songs
