= Nevermore (Mylène Farmer album) =

Live album by Mylène Farmer
- Released: 27 September 2024
- Recorded: 23–24 June 2023
- Venue: Groupama Stadium, Lyon
- Genre: Pop
- Length: 108:56
- Language: French
- Label: Stuffed Monkey; Sony

Mylène Farmer chronology
Remix XL (2024)	Nevermore (2024)	Égrégore (2026)

Nevermore is the eighth live album by French singer Mylène Farmer, released on 27 September 2024 by Stuffed Monkey and distributed by Sony Music. It was recorded during concerts in June 2023 at the Groupama Stadium in Lyon during the concert tour of the same name. On the day of the album's premiere, the singer began the final stage of her tour, postponed in 2023 due to the riots in Paris. On 19 September, the official concert video for the song "Oui mais... non" was released.

The album debuted at number one on the French chart with sales of over 36,700 copies, becoming Farmer's 17th chart topper album, after which it was certified Platinum and eventually sold 120,000 copies in France.

== Track listing ==
All lyrics are written by Mylène Farmer, except where noted; all music is composed by Laurent Boutonnat, except where noted.

Nevermore track listing
No.	Title	Lyrics	Music	Original album	Length
1.	"Prologue"		Yvan Cassar		6:20
2.	"Du temps"			2001.2011	3:30
3.	"Peut-être toi"			Avant que l'ombre...	4:55
4.	"Libertine"	Laurent Boutonnat	Jean-Claude Dequéant	Cendres de lune	4:45
5.	"Optimistique-moi"		Farmer	Innamoramento	5:03
6.	"À tout jamais"		Woodkid	L'emprise	3:54
7.	"C'est une belle journée"			Les Mots	4:55
8.	"Paysages glacés" (Intro Tristana)		Olivier Schultheis; Christophe Voisin-Boisvinet		1:11
9.	"Tristana"			Cendres de lune	4:39
10.	"Remember" (Medley)		Schultheis; Voisin-Boisvinet; Boutonnat; Feder; Quentin Segaud; Johanna Iser; Peter Hoppe; Anastassia Zimmerman; Ashley Hicklin; Kimberley Sawford	Point de suture, L'autre..., Désobéissance	3:45
11.	"Rayon vert" (with AaRON)	Olivier Coursier; Simon Buret	Coursier; Buret	L'emprise	4:46
12.	"Rêver"			Anamorphosée	7:20
13.	"L'autre..."			L'autre...	6:05
14.	"Que l'aube est belle"		Woodkid	L'emprise	8:53
15.	"Sans contrefaçon"			Ainsi soit je...	5:32
16.	"Oui mais... non"		Jimmy Joker; RedOne	Bleu noir	4:33
17.	"Que je devienne..."		Woodkid	L'emprise	4:56
18.	"XXL"			Anamorphosée	6:21
19.	"Rêve interdit" (Intro Désenchantée)		Schultheis; Johan Dalgaard		1:16
20.	"Désenchantée"			L'autre...	7:13
21.	"Rallumer les étoiles"		Moby	L'emprise	4:40
22.	"Épilogue"		Cassar		4:24
Total length:					108:56

== Charts ==
=== Weekly charts ===
Weekly chart performance for Nevermore
Chart (2024)	Peak position
Belgian Albums (Ultratop Flanders)	149
Belgian Albums (Ultratop Wallonia)	1
French Albums (SNEP)	1
Swiss Albums (Schweizer Hitparade)	4
Swiss Albums (GfK Romandy)	1

=== Year-end charts ===
2024 year-end chart performance for Nevermore
Chart (2024)	Position
French Albums (SNEP)	28
Belgian Albums (Ultratop Wallonia)	44

2025 year-end chart performance for Nevermore
Chart (2025)	Position
French Albums (SNEP)	160

== Certifications and sales ==
Certifications for Nevermore
Region	Certification	Certified units/sales
France (SNEP)	Platinum	100,000^{‡}
^{‡} Sales+streaming figures based on certification alone.
