= Remix XL =

Remix album by Mylène Farmer
- Released: 19 April 2024
- Genres: French touch; new wave; electronic; dance-pop
- Length: 118:16
- Labels: Stuffed Monkey; Sony

Mylène Farmer chronology
L'Emprise (2022)	Remix XL (2024)	Nevermore (2024)

Singles from Remix XL
- 1. "Désenchantée" Released: 23 February 2024; 2. "XXL" Released: 20 April 2024

Remix XL is the third remix album by French singer Mylène Farmer, released on 19 April 2024 (CD, LP, Digital) on Stuffed Monkey and Sony Music.

The album includes remixes of some of Farmer's most popular songs from different periods of her career. DJs such as Feder, The Hacker, Cut Killer, Arnaud Rebotini and The Avener worked on the album. Farmer recorded new vocals for some of the older tracks, which were originally released from 1986 to 1995; this is likely due to the fact that Universal Music retains the rights to the original versions of these songs.

== Track listing ==
Credits adapted from album liner notes.

All lyrics are written by Mylène Farmer except where noted; all music is composed by Laurent Boutonnat except where noted.

Remix XL track listing
No.	Title	Lyrics	Music	Original album	Length
1.	"Libertine" (NIT remix)	Laurent Boutonnat	Jean-Claude Dequéant	Cendres de lune	5:15
2.	"Sans contrefacon" (The Magician remix)			Ainsi soit je...	3:43
3.	"Pourvu qu'elles soient douces" (Cut Killer & Prez Poney Club remix)			Ainsi soit je...	3:24
4.	"Désenchantée" (Arnaud Rebotini remix)			L'autre...	7:48
5.	"Je t'aime mélancolie" (Rusty Egan remix)			L'autre...	4:30
6.	"California" (Arthur Baker remix)			Anamorphosée	7:18
7.	"XXL" (Blue Stahli remix)			Anamorphosée	4:04
8.	"Je te rends ton amour" (David Lynch remix)			Innamoramento	5:02
9.	"Optimistique-moi" (Feder remix)		Farmer	Innamoramento	5:31
10.	"C'est une belle journée" (The Hacker remix)			Les Mots	6:35
11.	"Sextonik" (Tomer G Sextonik reloaded club mix)			Point de suture	5:54
12.	"Oui mais... non"		RedOne; Jimmy Joker	Bleu noir	5:03
13.	"N'aie plus d'amertume" (Marsheaux remix)		Moby	Bleu noir	6:20
14.	"Du temps" (Dave Audé remix)			2001.2011	5:36
15.	"Des larmes" (Theo Hutchcraft remix)		LP; Mike Del Rio	Désobéissance	3:34
16.	"L'âme dans l'eau" (The Avener rework)		Adam Richardson; Jonathan Burr	Histoires de	3:17
17.	"Do You Know Who I Am" (Richard Norris remix)		Woodkid	L'emprise	6:52
18.	"Rayon vert (with AaRON)" (Fragrance & S Diamah remix)	Olivier Coursier; Simon Buret	Olivier Coursier; Simon Buret	L'emprise	4:01
19.	"Bouteille à la mer" (IKS remix)		Moby; Peter Gordeno; Dimitri Ehrlich; Armen Paul	L'emprise	6:36
20.	"Rallumer les étoiles" (Motherweshare remix)		Moby	L'emprise	11:00
21.	"Désenchantée" (Feder extended remix)			L'autre...	6:53
Total length:					118:16

== Charts ==
Chart performance for Remix XL
Chart (2024)	Peak position
Belgian Albums (Ultratop Flanders)	181
Belgian Albums (Ultratop Wallonia)	2
French Albums (SNEP)	2
French Physical Albums (SNEP)	2
Swiss Albums (Schweizer Hitparade)	5
Swiss Pop Albums (Schweizer Hitparade)	4
Swiss Vinyl Albums (Schweizer Hitparade)	4
Swiss Albums (Romandie)	2
