= Égrégore =

Studio album by Mylène Farmer
- Released: 30 October 2026
- Recorded: 2026
- Genres: Pop; electropop
- Length: 45:02
- Language: French
- Labels: Stuffed Monkey; #NP; Sony France
- Producers: Sage Devault; DJ Lewis; DJ Snake; Jen Jis; Moby; Nömak; Ragio

Mylène Farmer chronology
Nevermore (2024)	Égrégore (2026)

Singles from Égrégore
- 1. "Confession" Released: 13 May 2025; 2. "C'est à qui le tour" Released: 12 June 2026; 3. "Des lols et des quoi" Released: 11 September 2026

Égrégore is the thirteenth studio album by the French singer Mylène Farmer, released on 30 October 2026 by Stuffed Monkey, #NP and Sony Music Entertainment France. It is a follow-up to her 2022 studio album L'Emprise, consisting of thirteen tracks. It also includes her single "Confession"; a tribute to the late American filmmaker and director David Lynch, which was performed at Cannes in 2025. The album was accompanied by the 65-minute film Égrégore: Le Film, which was screened in theatres across French-speaking Europe on 27 October 2026. It features work from five different filmmakers, each for a different song from the album: Julia Ducournau, Antonin Baudry, Thierry and Didier Poiraud, Gilles Lellouche, and François Hanss.

== Album title ==
The word "Égrégore" comes from esoteric terminology and refers roughly to a collective spirit or psychic energy generated by a group united around shared desires, beliefs, or intentions. Farmer herself singled out égrégoire/égrégore as a favorite word in a 2025 interview, describing her attraction to the idea of "vibratory" communion. That makes the title particularly interesting for Farmer: her concerts and fan community can themselves be understood as an égrégore—thousands of people sharing the same symbols, songs, emotions, and rituals.

== Singles ==
The lead single from the album is "C'est à qui le tour", produced by DJ Lewis of Drake fame.

The music video was directed by Julia Ducournau, whom Farmer had met when she gave her her Palme d'Or for Titane at the 2021 Cannes Film Festival.

The second single "Des lols et des quoi" was released on 11 September 2026 on digital platforms, along with the music video; which was directed by Thierry and Didier Poiraud.

Actor/director Gilles Lellouche also confirmed he would direct a music video for the album.

== Artwork ==
The artwork was designed by Jean-Baptiste Mondino who had already photographed Mylène Farmer for her 2018 studio album Désobéissance and her 2020 compilation album Histoires de.

== Track listing ==
All lyrics are written by Mylène Farmer.

Égrégore track listing
No.	Title	Music	Producer	Length
1.	"C'est à qui le tour"	Philip Böllhoff; DJ Lewis; Ragio; Ana Zimmer	Lewis; Ragio	2:49
2.	"Des lols et des quoi"	Antoine Chatenet; Lewis	DJ Lewis; Ragio^{[a]}	3:38
3.	"Égrégore"	Chatenet; Lewis; Anna Majidson	Lewis; Jen Jis	3:14
4.	"Combien pour la nuit" (featuring DJ Snake)	William Grigahcine; Kiddo; Giampaolo Parisi; Marco Parisi; Victor Thell	Devault; DJ Snake	3:34
5.	"Entendre ma voix"	Lewis; Zimmer	Lewis; Jen Jis; Ragio^{[a]}	3:20
6.	"Reste la lumière"	Chatenet; Lewis; Ragio	Lewis; Ragio	3:21
7.	"Sans amarres" (featuring DJ Snake)	Grigahcine; Nicholas Petitfrère	DJ Snake; Nömak	3:50
8.	"Recréer un jour"	Moby	Moby	5:04
9.	"On a toujours le choix"	Chatenet; John Dear; Lewis; Ragio; Zimmer	Lewis; Ragio; Jen Jis	3:34
10.	"Déni"	Chatenet; Marion Corrales; Lewis	Lewis; Jen Jis; Ragio	2:56
11.	"Confession"	Rodrigue Janois; Jean-Pierre Pilot; Olivier Schultheis		2:46
12.	"Dieu est mort"	Chatenet; Corrales; Lewis; Zimmer	Lewis; Jen Jis; Ragio	2:14
13.	"Plus d'écho"	Moby	Moby	4:35
Total length:				45:02

=== Note ===
- ^{^[a]} indicates an additional producer

== Personnel ==
Credits are adapted from Tidal.

- Mylène Farmer – vocals
- Jérôme Devoise – engineering (all tracks), mixing (1–3, 5, 6, 8–13)
- Mike Marsh – mastering
- Nömak – mixing (4, 7)
- DJ Snake – vocals (4, 7)

== Charts ==
Chart performance for Égrégore
Chart (2026)	Peak position
Belgian Albums (Ultratop Flanders)	15
Belgian Albums (Ultratop Wallonia)	2
Swiss Albums (Schweizer Hitparade)	2
UK Album Downloads (Official Charts)	40
