= Rayon vert =

Single by Mylène Farmer & AaRON

from the album L'Emprise
- Language: French
- Released: 4 November 2022
- Genre: Electropop
- Length: 3:43
- Label: Stuffed Monkey, #np, Sony
- Composer: AaRON
- Lyricist: AaRON
- Producer: AaRON

Mylène Farmer & AaRON singles chronology
"À tout jamais" (2022)	"Rayon vert" (2022)	"Rallumer les étoiles" (2023)

"Rayon vert" (English: Green Ray) is the second single from Mylène Farmer's twelfth studio album L'emprise, composed by, produced by and recorded with the French group AaRON. It hit the Top 50 in France.

== Versions ==
Apart from its official singles released on its maxi single release, the song is available in a bonus "piano version" on its parent album. This is the version that was performed live by Mylène Farmer and AaRON on her 2023/2024 Nevermore Tour. Both versions were released in their instrumental mixes on L'emprise (Instrumental Version).

== Music video ==
The official music video was directed by François Hanss, who had already directed several videos for Mylène Farmer, such as the controversial 1999 video for Je te rends ton amour.

== Track listing ==
Maxi vinyl & CD

1. "Rayon vert" (Green Ray's Remix by Vitalic)
2. "Rayon vert" (Single Version)
3. "Rayon vert" (Sub-Duct Green Flash Remix by Motherweshare)
4. "Rayon vert" (John Lord Fonda Trap Remix by Lord Fonda)

== Charts ==
Weekly chart performance for "Rayon vert"
Chart (2022)	Peak position
France (SNEP)	45
