= Mylène Farmer 2019 =

2019 concert residency by Mylène Farmer

- Residency by Mylène Farmer
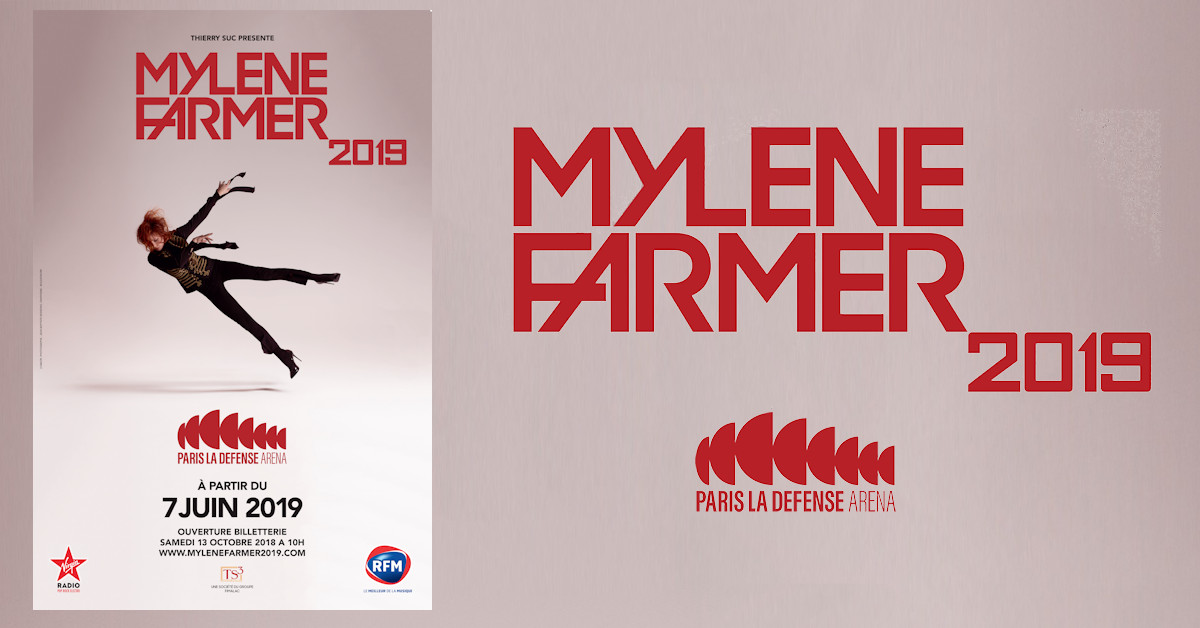
- Location: Nanterre, France
- Venue: Paris La Défense Arena
- Associated albums: Interstellaires; Désobéissance
- Start date: 7 June 2019
- End date: 22 June 2019
- No. of shows: 9
- Guests: Sting (18 June 2019)
- Attendance: 235,000
- Box office: US $31.7 million
- Website: Official website (archived)

Mylène Farmer concert chronology
- Timeless (2013); Mylène Farmer 2019 (2019); Nevermore 2023/2024 (2023–24)

Mylène Farmer 2019 was a concert residency by French recording artist Mylène Farmer, launched in support of her tenth and eleventh studio albums, Interstellaires and Désobéissance. It began on 7 June 2019 and concluded on 22 June 2019 at the Paris La Défense Arena in Nanterre, France. It is Farmer's second residency after Avant que l'ombre... à Bercy in 2006, and her seventh series of concerts, 30 years after her first tour in 1989.

The series of concerts was first announced on 30 September 2018, two days after the release of Farmer's eleventh studio album, Désobéissance. Initially, six dates were announced; on 14 October, two new dates were added, and on 14 February 2018, a final date was added, bringing the total number of concerts to nine. Farmer and long-time collaborator Laurent Boutonnat served as creative directors, while Boutonnat directed the show.

The concerts were divided into five sections and an encore, and was heavily influenced by cyberpunk aesthetics, especially the film Blade Runner. The concert series received universal critical acclaim, with critics complimenting the stage, the artistic direction, the set list and Farmer's vocals. The residency was also successful commercially, selling 120,000 tickets on the first day; ultimately, the nine shows were attended by 235,000 spectators.

An accompanying live album, Live 2019 was released on 18 October 2019, while a concert film, featuring footage shot during all nine dates, was released on 6 December 2019 as Live 2019 - Le Film.

== Background and development ==
In 2013, Farmer embarked on the Timeless 2013 tour to promote her albums Monkey Me and Bleu Noir, before taking a break from performing. She released her album Interstellaires in November 2015, but did not promote the album with a concert tour. The series of concerts was first announced on 30 September 2018, two days after the release of Farmer's eleventh studio album, Désobéissance.

The tour was designed especially for La Défense Arena, with no other concerts planned for other venues. According to Thierry Suc, Farmer's manager, the two were inspired to conceive a show with the La Défense Arena in mind after seeing The Rolling Stones play in the venue during their No Filter Tour in 2017.

On 13 October 2018, the tickets for the first six shows were available to the general public. Due to high demand, two more shows were announced for 18 and 19 June. In February 2019, the ninth show was announced, scheduled for 22 June.

In January 2019, Gala announced that Farmer was developing the set list and started preparing for the residency. She later also specified that she chose a domed stadium for her residency because she had conceived her entrance to happen in complete darkness. Rehearsals took place in May 2019 at La Seine Musicale, before moving to La Défense Arena in the two weeks preceding the start of the residency.

Farmer enlisted Emmanuelle Favre to design the stage, which featured an 54-metre opening. The mise-en-scène found inspiration mainly from Captain Harlock, Blade Runner and 2001: A Space Odyssey. The set design included a large LED screen, fronted by several smaller LED screens which formed a triangle reminiscent of the Tyrell building in Blade Runner and Blade Runner 2049. The production design was described as "untransportable" due to the complexity of the stage and the number of smaller LED screens installed above the audience.

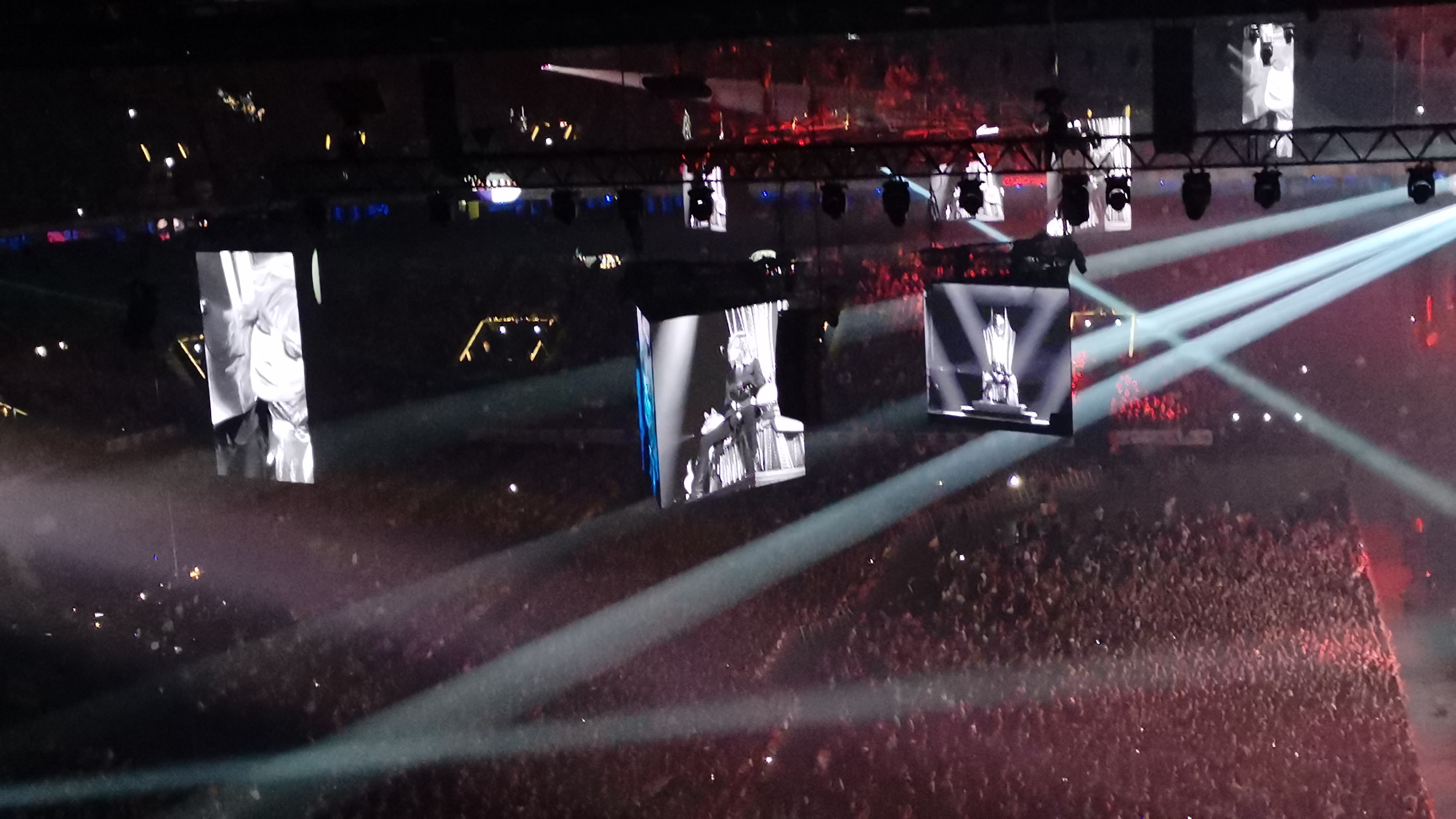
Numerous LED cubes were installed throughout La Défense Arena for the concert.

Atelier Artefact designed several props for the production, including a Game of Thrones-inspired throne and a futuristic lighting rig. Belgian company WIcreations was responsible for the motion gear used in the production, including a 5-metre light-up ring used by Farmer during her entrance, a retracting 24-metre runway, two stage blocks that could be lifted up 6 metres from the floor, and a central stage block which could be lifted up and flown above the audience.

The troupe included 16 dancers, including long-time dancers Aziz Baki and Raphaël Baptista, all of whom sported red hair during the shows. Olivier Schultheis was enlisted as musical director for the concerts, arranging new songs from Interstellaires and Désobéissance for stage, as well as re-imagining Farmer's older songs. Farmer, Aziz Baki and Parris Goebel choreographed the movements. The concert was divided into six segments, reflecting Farmer's wardrobe, designed by Jean Paul Gaultier. The band featured Johan Dalgaard and Vincent Bidal as keyboards players, Joel Shearer and Sébastien Chouard on guitar, Archive member Jonathan Noyce on bass, and Charles Paxson on drums. The tour's official poster featured a photograph of Farmer falling, shot by Jean-Baptiste Mondino.

== Concert synopsis ==
The concert was divided into five distinct segments and an encore. It started with a video introduction featuring glitching figures and Farmer on multiple video screens, as well as dark clouds. Farmer ascended from the ceiling in a 5-metre illuminated circle, which landed at the end of the runway. She proceeded along the runway as a futuristic-looking city inspired by Blade Runner and Blade Runner 2049 was shown in the background. Farmer then faced the audience and sang "Interstellaires" in a black ensemble with a golden corset, as the band moved closer to her. "Sans logique" was performed next with Farmer walking on the stage. For the third song, "Rolling Stone," Farmer recreated a choreography assisted by 16 dancers. Farmer then removed her corset and performed "Pourvu qu'elles soient douces" with the dancers; the performance also featured dialogue from the original music video. "Stolen Car" was then performed as a virtual Sting appeared in the background. The section ended with a performance of "Des larmes." Towards the end, Farmer walked out while the band performed an instrumental outro.

The second act opened with a performance of "California." Farmer was joined by two guitarists and female dancers to perform a sensual rendition of the song, while the background featured a cyberpunk cityscape. "M'effondre" was then performed with the short film Ghost Cell playing in the background, which depicted "an organic Paris seen as a cell through a virtual microscope." Towards the end, the dancers emerged on two stage blocks that were lifted up for the performance of "L'Âme-stram-gram." The song was mixed with Rammstein's 1997 song "Du hast." The act ended with a hip-hop inspired dance interlude.

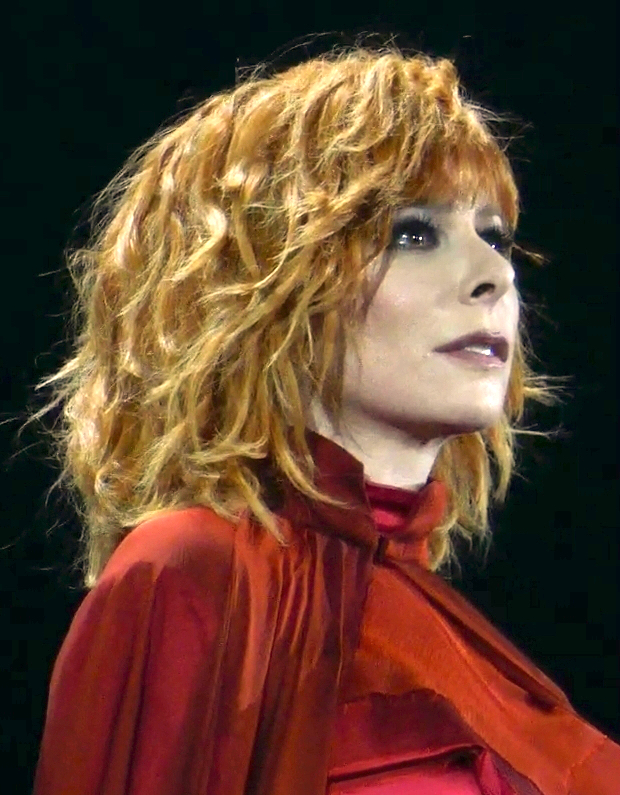
Farmer performing "L'Horloge" as the encore.

The third act saw Farmer performed three intimate ballads: "Un jour au l'autre" was first performed in a white gown as Farmer walked from the stage along the runway. At the end of the runway, she joined pianist Vincent Bidal to perform "Ainsi soit je..." and "Innamoramento." An extended outro was played as she walked back to the main stage.

"Sans contrefaçon" opened the fourth segment, featuring Farmer dressed in a sailor-inspired ensemble. She performed an energetic dance routine before inviting the audience to sing the song together. "Histoires de fesses" was then performed in a jocular way with the LED screens showing anatomically improbable movements created through motion graphic design. The act ended with a rendition of "Sentimentale."

Farmer opened the fifth act with an extended version of "Désenchantée," during which a central stage box was lifted and flown above the audience, with Farmer and two dancers recreating the original choreography on top of it. Farmer then proceeded to invite the audience for a sing-along. "Rêver" was then performed with a pop-rock ballad instrumentation. "Je te rends ton amour" was then performed, with Farmer sitting on a wolf throne, reminiscent of Game of Thrones and Captain Harlock. The main show ended with a mash-up of "C'est dans l'air" and "Fuck Them All." Farmer then thanked the audience as an extended outro of the song was performed.

For the encore, Farmer performed "L'Horloge," a song based on Charles Baudelaire's poem "The Clock." She appeared in front of dark clouds and a pyramid of skulls, reminiscent of the painting The Apotheosis of War. Towards the end, the LED screen depicted flames, and orange-coloured smoke appeared on stage. Farmer was then seen walking through the fire after waving goodbye to the audience. Then, the orange-coloured flames quickly turned grey, and the show ended with the smoke flying away.

== Commercial and critical reception ==
The residency was commercially successful. When tickets for the six original shows were put online, 120,000 tickets were sold on the first day, prompting the organisers to add three additional dates. Ultimately, it is estimated that between 235,000 and 240,000 tickets were sold over nine sold-out shows.

The concert series received critical acclaim. Léna Lutaud for Le Figaro complimented the modern arrangements of Farmer's older songs and the singer's stage presence. Sylvain Siclier for Le Monde described the show as successful and praised its pacing, highlighting that the spectacular sequences were balanced out by more sophisticated performances. Têtu described Farmer's voice as crystalline and complimented the show's modernity. Europe1.fr described the show as gigantic. Benjamin Locoge for Paris Match described the concert as breathtaking and praised the song selection. In a review for Le Parisien, Emmanuel Marolle praised the show as exceptional and identified the opening and finale as highlights. Despite the overall positive reaction, several journalists criticised Farmer's decision to use pre-recorded backing vocals instead of traditional in-person backing vocalists.

== Broadcast and recording ==
A live album titled Live 2019 was released on 18 October 2019 and has sold over 100,000 units, earning a Platinum classification in France. On 7 November 2019, the live film of the concert was also shown in cinemas for one date only. The screening had a total of 155,000 spectators around the world (130,000 in France), in 18 different countries and 625 cinemas. Released on home media on 6 December 2019, the film sold over 80,000 units (2× Diamond) in 3 weeks.

The concert was also broadcast two times in 2020 on the M6 Group channels: first on 14 January on channel W9, bringing together 989,000 viewers. A second broadcast took place on 31 December on channel M6, this time bringing together 1,365,000 viewers.

The concert special is also available on Amazon Prime Video. In addition, a three-part documentary offering about the conception and development of the residency entitled Mylène Farmer, L'Ultime création was released on 25 September 2020, also on Amazon Prime Video.

== Set list ==
The following setlist was the same for the nine concerts of the residency.

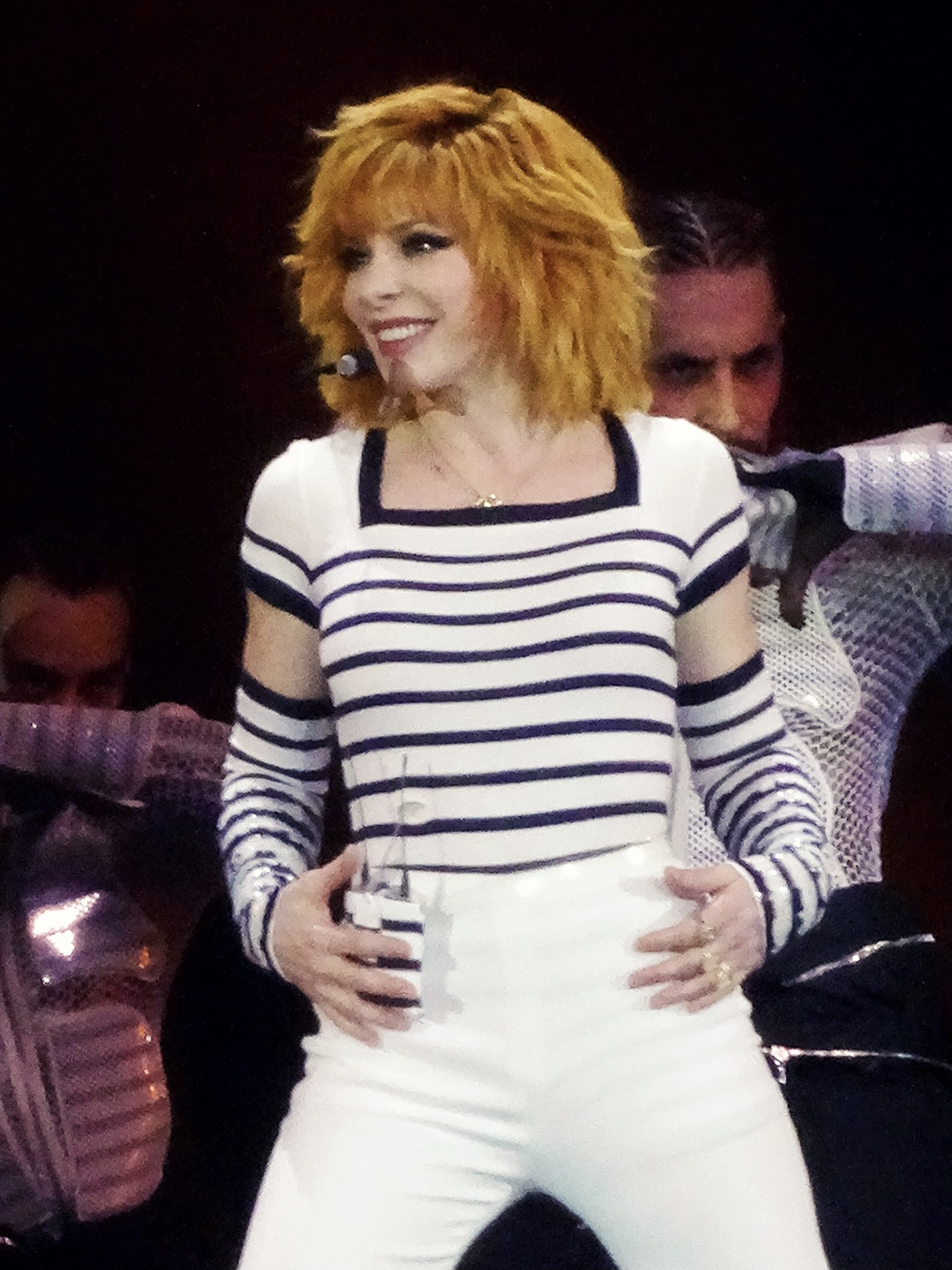
Farmer performing "Sans contrefaçon"

1. "Coming from the Vortex" (intro)
2. "Interstellaires"
3. "Sans logique"
4. "Rolling Stone"
5. "Pourvu qu'elles soient douces"
6. "Stolen Car" (virtual duet with Sting)
7. "Des larmes"
8. "California"
9. "M'effondre"
10. "L'âme-stram-gram" (contains elements of "Du hast")
11. "Hard Hip Hop" (interlude; contains elements of "Bucky Done Gun")
12. "Un jour ou l'autre"
13. "Ainsi soit je..."
14. "Innamoramento"
15. "Sans contrefaçon"
16. "Histoires de fesses" (contains elements of "Histoires de fesses - Extended Version")
17. "Sentimentale"
18. "Désenchantée"
19. "Rêver"
20. "Je te rends ton amour"
21. "C'est dans l'air" / "Fuck Them All"
22. "L'Horloge"

=== Notes ===
- During the show on 18 June, Sting joined Farmer for a live duet performance of "Stolen Car." A duet performance of "Les Mots" was also rehearsed for the date, but was later not included in the show.
- According to the documentary special L'Ultime Création, "N'oublie pas" was also rehearsed for the concerts, but was later not included in the set list.

== Personnel ==
=== Show ===
- Mylène Farmer & Laurent Boutonnat – creative and artistic directors
- Laurent Boutonnat – director
- Thierry Suc for TS3 (FIMALAC) - producer (also Mylène Farmer's manager)
- Emmanuelle Favre – show architect (in collaboration with Dimitri Vassiliu)
- Dimitri Vassiliu - lights architect
- Jérome Devoise & Stéphane Plisson - sound
- Anthony Souchet - artistic advisor
- Jean Paul Gaultier - Costumes

=== Band ===
- Mylène Farmer – vocals, background vocals
- Vincent Bidal – piano, keyboards
- Johan Dalgaard - keyboards
- Joël Shearer - guitar
- Sébastien Chouard - guitar
- Jonathan Noyce - bass
- Charlie Paxson – drums
- Olivier Schultheis – musical director (with Christophe Voisin Boisvinet)
- Sting - guest

=== Choreographers ===
- Parris Goebel assisted by Cullen Neale - choreographer of "Pourvu qu'elles soient douces," "California," "L'Âme-stram-gram" and "Hard Hip Hop"
- Mylène Farmer & Aziz Baki - choreographers of "Sans contrefaçon" and "Désenchantée"
- Mylène Farmer - choreographer of "Rolling Stone"
- Aziz Baki - choreographer of "Histoires de fesses" and Mashup ("Fuck them all" / "C'est dans l'air")
- Valérie Bony – supervising choreographer
- Christophe Danchaud – supervising choreographer

=== Dancers ===
- Aziz Baki
- Raphaël Baptista
- Jade Gaumet
- Jocelyn Laurent
- Martin Gavidia
- Delphine Tournie
- Mehdi Layo Leyre
- Antoine Randon
- Thomas Gréaux
- Kenji Matsunaga
- Ellie Spyth
- Jamie Mason
- Melissa Crispim Freire
- Michael Boateng
- Samuel Max Fleet
- Thomas Fryearson

== Shows ==
Date (2019)	City	Country	Venue
7 June	Nanterre	France	Paris La Défense Arena
8 June	Nanterre	France	Paris La Défense Arena
11 June	Nanterre	France	Paris La Défense Arena
12 June	Nanterre	France	Paris La Défense Arena
14 June	Nanterre	France	Paris La Défense Arena
15 June	Nanterre	France	Paris La Défense Arena
18 June	Nanterre	France	Paris La Défense Arena
19 June	Nanterre	France	Paris La Défense Arena
22 June	Nanterre	France	Paris La Défense Arena
