= Nevermore 2023/2024 =

2023–24 concert tour by Mylène Farmer

- Tour by Mylène Farmer
- Associated album: L'Emprise
- Start date: 3 June 2023
- End date: 1 October 2024
- Legs: 2
- No. of shows: 14
- Website: Official website

Mylène Farmer concert chronology
- Mylène Farmer 2019 (2019); Nevermore 2023/2024 (2023–24); ...

Nevermore 2023/2024 (also stylized as Nevermore 2023/2024 | Tournée des stades) was the sixth concert tour and eighth series of concerts by French recording artist and songwriter Mylène Farmer, launched in support of her twelfth studio album, L'Emprise. It started on 3 June 2023 at Stade Pierre-Mauroy in Lille, and concluded on 1 October 2024 at Stade de France in Paris. It is the singer's first tour to take place completely in stadiums, the first tour since 2013 and the first series of concerts since 2019.

The tour was first announced on 22 June 2021, after media speculation and online teasers posted on Farmer's YouTube channel. The tour was also set to visit Russia in August or September, but no dates were announced. On 21 March 2022, the Russian concerts were cancelled in light of the Russian invasion of Ukraine. On 30 June 2023, the two shows in Paris at the Stade de France were cancelled due to the civil unrest caused by the killing of Nahel Merzouk, and were later rescheduled for September 2024, with a third and final additional date announced.

The concert tour has been commercially successful. Initially, eleven dates were announced. Tickets were put on sale on 1 October 2021. In the first two hours, 100,000 tickets were sold, prompting the organisers to schedule second additional dates in some cities, bringing the total number of shows to 14. In total, an estimated 677,000 tickets were sold.

== Background and development ==
Following the release of Farmer's eleventh studio album, Désobéissance, Farmer announced her seventh series of concerts entitled Mylène Farmer 2019. The residency at Paris La Défense Arena proved to be a commercial success; Farmer performed 9 concerts in front of 235,000 spectators. In addition, it was the ninth best-selling show of 2019 for a female vocalist, with a total revenue of $31,700,000. Despite the commercial success, several critics speculated that it would be Farmer's last series of concerts.

On 9 June 2021, Farmer started teasing an upcoming project by changing the banner of her YouTube channel to a dark image which read MF-NM. On 10 June, Farmer uploaded a video showing a raven's eye on YouTube, where the word Nevermore was first mentioned. On 13 June, a new video was uploaded, featuring a photo of Farmer taken for the live album En concert in the raven's eye, with the title Nevermore 2023. The tour was officially announced on 22 June.

Thierry Suc, Farmer's manager, disclosed in November 2022 that construction of the sets would begin shortly. Le Parisien reported that 90 semi-trailers would be needed for the tour and also announced that long-time collaborator Laurent Boutonnat would not be serving as creative director.

== Concert synopsis ==
Before the start of the show, the stage was covered by three large LED screens: a rectangular one at each end, and a large central one decorated with the image of large crows in profile. In the center, the tour logo was displayed. At the end of the cross-shaped runway, an inflatable sculpture of two back-to-back crows was installed. Before the start of the concert, the music video of "Regrets" was shown, in remembrance of Jean-Louis Murat, who had died shortly before the tour commenced.

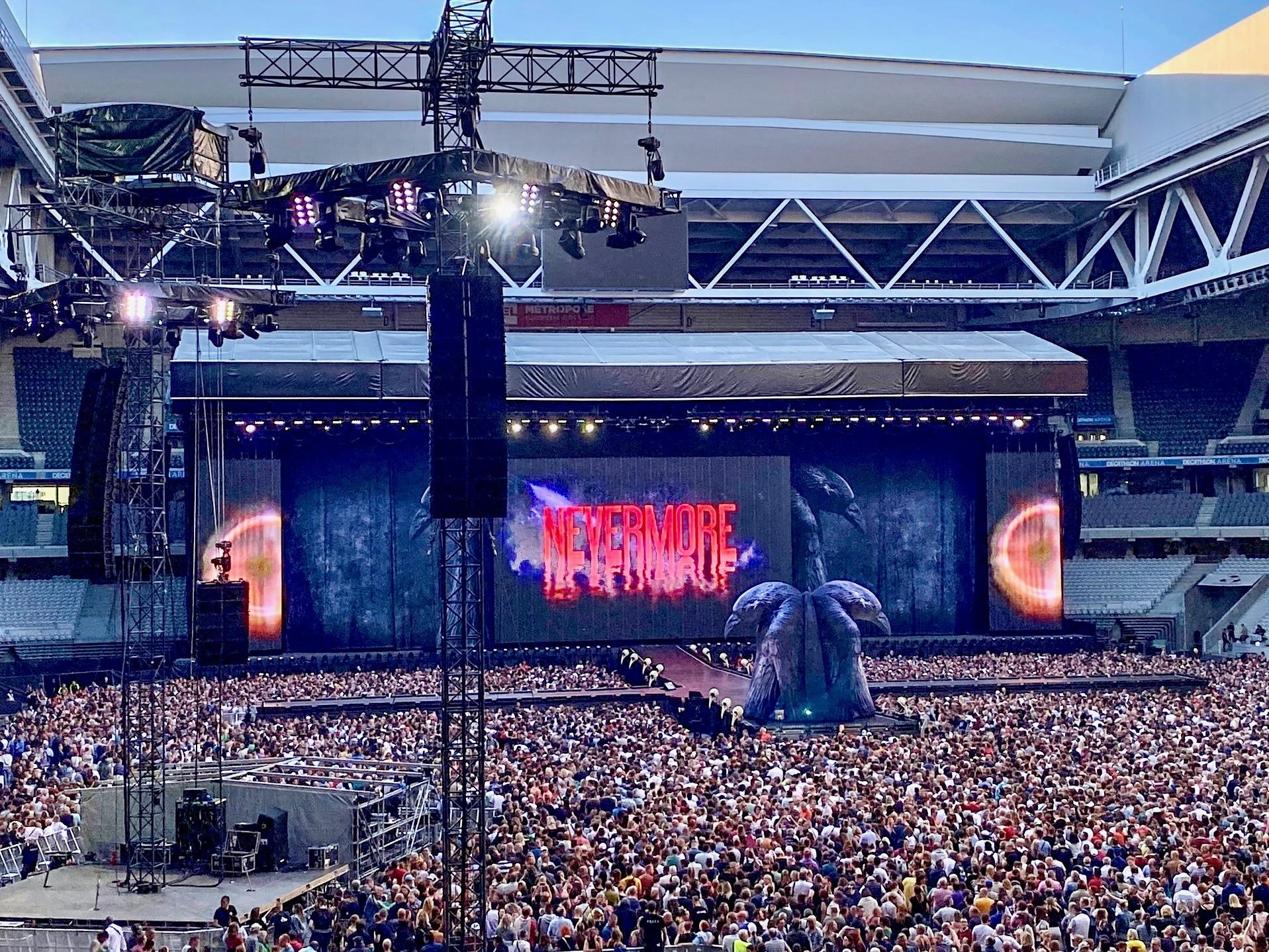
Nevermore stage before the concert

The concert started with a video prologue featuring an unkindness of ravens flying towards the audience. Farmer emerged at the centre of the stage in front of two giant wings wearing an equestrian-inspired outfit, and performed "Du temps" while greeting and walking towards the audience, as scarecrows emerged along the runway. She then proceeded along the cross-shaped runway and performed "Peut-être toi" on a flying crane at the left side of the stage. The backdrop featured crows flying onto electrical power lines. She then performed "Libertine" on a similar flying crane on the other side. The performance ended with Farmer shooting into the screen with an 18th-century pistol, inspired by the music video of the song.

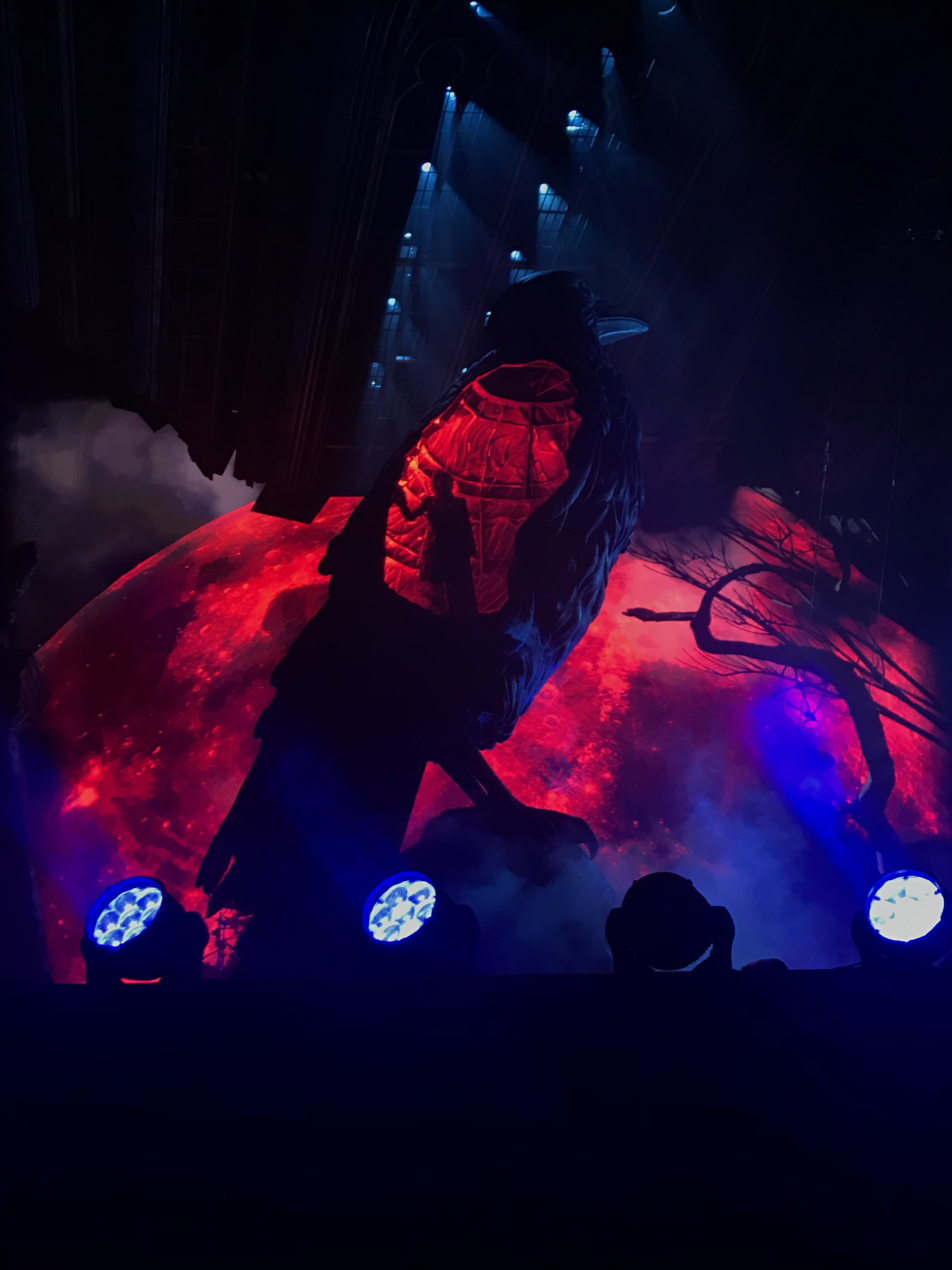
Farmer performing "Tristana" during the second act at Stade de Genève.

The screens, showing shattered glass, then moved and revealed the main stage, featuring the interior of a Gothic cathedral, with a large arched portal and a tympanum, large windows and several crosses and statues. Farmer performed "Optimistique-moi" in a church setting, wearing a brown jacket. She then went on to perform "À tout jamais" with her dancers, while the background featured Farmer's 3D-scanned avatar. "C'est une belle journée" was performed with a choreographed routine. The act concluded with a performance of "Tristana" inside a raven sculpture, as well as an interlude featuring music from several of Farmer's songs.

The third act featured intimate ballads. Farmer first performed "Rayon vert" as a duet with French pop band AaRON. A performance of "Rêver" and "L'autre" followed on the runway, where Farmer introduced the band, and sang the songs in an acoustic setting. "Que l'aube est belle..." was performed at the end of the act, while Farmer's 3D avatar in the background was shown in front of beautiful landscapes and flying towards the Sun, as the band performed an instrumental outro.

"Sans contrefaçon" opened the fourth segment of the show. Farmer and her dancers performed the song sporting outfits inspired by her 1989 concert tour, while the background depicted a marionette doll. She then sang "Oui mais... non" featuring the choreography from the music video of the song.

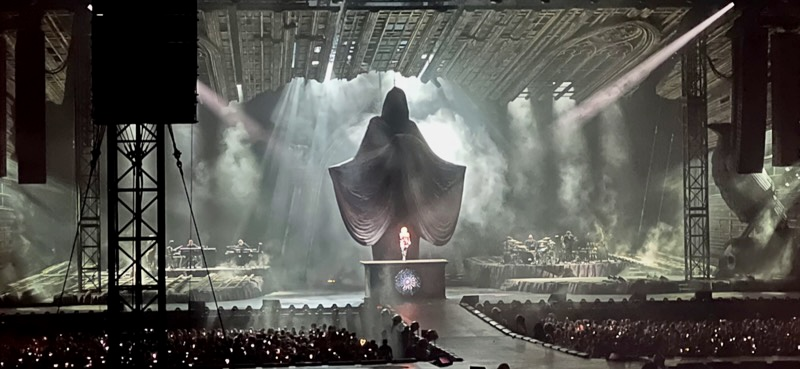
Farmer performing "Que je devienne..." in the fifth act of the concert.

The fifth act opened with a video introduction set to the music of "Ode à l'apesanteur" entitled "The Crow." Made by artist Glenn Marshall, it featured AI-generated images of a dancing bird in front of a post-apocalyptic background. Farmer performed "Que je devienne..." in front of a large sculpture, with her dancers dressed as monks, and "XXL." At the end, Farmer's band performed an extended outro. She then finished the main set with a choreographed rendition of "Désenchantée," with her dancers wearing scarecrow masks, similar to those in her 2005 music video for "Fuck Them All." She then invited the audience to sing along to the song.

As an encore, Farmer returned on stage with her dancers to perform "Rallumer les étoiles" with shooting stars in the background. Farmer then thanked the audience. An instrumental epilogue played as she stepped into a bird cage and was suspended in air, and her visage disintegrated into numerous flying ravens, similarly to the prologue of the concert.

== Commercial performance ==
Farmer unveiled the initial tour dates on 22 June 2021, with the intention of playing eleven stadium concerts across cities France, Switzerland and Belgium, and unspecified dates in Russia. An official website was set up to announce the dates. In August, a final tour date in Nice was added. On 1 October, the official presale opened. In its first two hours, 100,000 tickets were sold, while 200,000 tickets were sold in the first eight hours of the pre-sale period. Tickets for the general public went on sale on 4 October 2021. In ten days, TS Productions reported that 340,000 tickets had already been sold out of 500,000.

On 17 January 2022, both Nantes dates and dates in Lyon and Bordeaux were billed as sold-out. Thierry Suc, Farmer's manager disclosed that the concerts scheduled in Russia had been cancelled due to the 2022 Russian invasion of Ukraine. The initially announced first date at Stade de Genève was cancelled on 16 August 2022 due to the relaxations of the COVID-19 safety measures in Switzerland, which had originally meant that only 50% of seats had been put on sale for each of the two concerts.

In September 2022, the organisers reported that 400,000 tickets had already been sold and five dates had been completely sold-out, prompting them to add a second date in Lyon and Bordeaux, bringing the total number of concerts to 13. As of November 2022, seven dates were completely sold out and 550,000 tickets had been sold.

== Broadcast and recording ==
The concerts in Lyon on 23 and 24 June 2023, were filmed for future broadcast, using 10 cameras on fixed planes to the right of the stage, as well as two telescopic camera cranes and two spidercams, and a drone. The film, directed by François Hanss is to be shown in cinemas on 7 November 2024. Nevermore, the live album and concert film, was released on 27 September, the same date as the first Paris show.

== Setlist ==
1. "Prologue"
2. "Du temps"
3. "Peut-être toi"
4. "Libertine"
5. "Optimistique-moi"
6. "À tout jamais"
7. "C'est une belle journée"
8. "Tristana"
9. "Nevermore Medley" (interlude; contains elements of "Do You Know Who I Am," "Dégénération," "Je t'aime mélancolie," "Beyond My Control," "Rolling Stone," "Pourvu qu'elles soient douces" and "Tristana")
10. "Rayon vert" (duet with AaRON)
11. "Rêver"
12. "L'autre"
13. "Que l'aube est belle"
14. "Sans contrefaçon"
15. "Oui mais... non"
16. "Ode à l'apesanteur" (Interlude)
17. "Que je devienne..."
18. "XXL"
19. "Désenchantée"
20. "Rallumer les étoiles"
21. "Epilogue"

=== Notes ===
- During the shows on 3 June in Lille and on 9 and 10 June in Nantes, Farmer performed "Pas le temps de vivre" after "Rêver." Starting with the show on 17 June in Geneva, Farmer sang "L'autre."
- During the shows on 27, 28 September and 1 October in Paris, Farmer was joined by Seal to sing "Les Mots", replacing "L'autre" from the setlist.

== Shows ==
List of European shows
Date	City	Country	Venue	Attendance	Revenue
3 June 2023	Lille	France	Stade Pierre-Mauroy	45,000	—
9 June 2023	Nantes	France	Stade de la Beaujoire	60,000	—
10 June 2023	Nantes	France	Stade de la Beaujoire	60,000	—
17 June 2023	Geneva	Switzerland	Stade de Genève	35,000	—
23 June 2023	Lyon	France	Groupama Stadium	90,000	—
24 June 2023	Lyon	France	Groupama Stadium	90,000	—
8 July 2023	Marseille	France	Orange Vélodrome	48,000	—
14 July 2023	Bordeaux	France	Matmut Atlantique	—	—
15 July 2023	Bordeaux	France	Matmut Atlantique	—	—
22 July 2023	Brussels	Belgium	King Baudouin Stadium	—	—
29 July 2023	Nice	France	Allianz Riviera	—	—
27 September 2024 (Note: The concerts on 27 and 28 September 2024, at Stade de France were originally scheduled to take place on 30 June and 1 July 2023, respectively, but were postponed due to the Nahel Merzouk protests and riots in Paris.)	Paris	France	Stade de France	—	—
28 September 2024	Paris	France	Stade de France	—	—
1 October 2024	Paris	France	Stade de France	—	—
