= N'oublie pas =

Single by Mylène Farmer and LP

from the album Désobéissance
- Released: 22 June 2018
- Genre: Pop; electropop
- Length: 3:44
- Label: Sony
- Songwriters: Mylène Farmer; Nate Campany; Mike Del Rio; Laura Pergolizzi
- Producer: Mike Del Rio

Mylène Farmer singles chronology
"Rolling Stone" (2018)	"N'oublie pas" (2018)	"Sentimentale" (2018)

LP singles chronology
"Other People" (2016)	"N'oublie pas" (2018)	"Girls Go Wild" (2018)

Music video
- "N'oublie pas" on YouTube

"N'oublie pas" is a song recorded in 2018 by Mylène Farmer in collaboration with American singer LP. The song reached number one on the French Singles Chart.

== Charts ==
Chart (2018)	Peak position
Belgium (Ultratip Bubbling Under Wallonia)	17
France (SNEP)	1
