= Sentimentale =

Sentimentale may refer to:

- "Sentimentale", French song by Marie Myriam Yamaha Music Festival 1982
- "Sentimentale", Italian song by Mina from Mina (1971 album)
- "Sentimentale", French song by Mylène Farmer from Désobéissance 2018
