= Live 2019 =

Live album by Mylène Farmer
- Released: 18 October 2019
- Recorded: June 2019
- Venue: Paris La Défense Arena
- Genre: Pop/Rock
- Length: 115:26
- Label: Polydor
- Producer: Laurent Boutonnat.

Mylène Farmer chronology
Désobéissance (2018)	Live 2019 (2019)	Histoires de (2020)

Live 2019 is a live album by French singer Mylène Farmer, released on 18 October 2019. It was recorded during her concert residency in Paris in June 2019. Live 2019 Le Film was released on DVD and Blu-ray on 6 December 2019.

== Track listing ==
All tracks are written by Mylène Farmer and Laurent Boutonnat except where noted.

Live 2019 – CD (disc one)
No.	Title	Writer(s)	Original album	Length
1.	"Coming from the Vortex"	Laurent Boutonnat		8:29
2.	"Interstellaires"	Mylène Farmer; Martin Kierszenbaum	Interstellaires	3:48
3.	"Sans logique"		Ainsi soit je...	3:51
4.	"Rolling Stone"	Farmer; Feder; Johanna Iser; Peter Hoppe; Anastassia Zimmerman; Ashley Hicklin; Kimberley Sawford; Quentin Segaud	Désobéissance	3:52
5.	"Pourvu qu'elles soient douces"		Ainsi soit je...	5:24
6.	"Stolen Car" (with Sting)	Farmer; Sting	Interstellaires	3:33
7.	"Des larmes"	Farmer; Mike Del Rio; LP	Désobéissance	4:28
8.	"California"		Anamorphosée	6:10
9.	"M'effondre"	Farmer; Moby	Bleu noir	3:30
10.	"L'Âme-stram-gram"		Innamoramento	4:08
11.	"Hard Hip Hop"	Christophe Voisin-Boisvinet; Olivier Schultheis		3:33
Total length:				50:46

Live 2019 – CD (disc two)
No.	Title	Writer(s)	Original album	Length
1.	"Un jour ou l'autre"	Farmer; Kierszenbaum	Interstellaires	4:51
2.	"Ainsi soit je..."			5:38
3.	"Innamoramento"		Innamoramento	6:51
4.	"Sans contrefaçon"		Ainsi soit je...	4:24
5.	"Histoires de fesses"	Farmer; Feder	Désobéissance	3:07
6.	"Sentimentale"	Farmer; Feder; Quentin Segaud	Désobéissance	3:20
7.	"Désenchantée"		L'autre...	10:20
8.	"Rêver"		Anamorphosée	6:16
9.	"Je te rends ton amour"		Innamoramento	5:29
10.	"Fuck Them All/C'est dans l'air"		Avant que l'ombre..., Point de suture	6:03
11.	"L'Horloge"	Charles Baudelaire; Boutonnat	Ainsi soit je...	8:21
Total length:				64:40

Live 2019 Le Film – DVD or Blu-ray
No.	Title	Length
1.	"Coming from the Vortex"	9:01
2.	"Interstellaires"	3:45
3.	"Sans logique"	3:50
4.	"Rolling Stone"	3:46
5.	"Pourvu qu'elles soient douces"	5:34
6.	"Stolen Car" (with Sting)	3:38
7.	"Des larmes"	4:33
8.	"California"	6:09
9.	"M'effondre"	3:36
10.	"L'Âme-stram-gram"	4:04
11.	"Hard Hip Hop"	3:47
12.	"Un jour ou l'autre"	5:29
13.	"Ainsi soit je..."	6:35
14.	"Innamoramento"	6:47
15.	"Sans contrefaçon"	6:59
16.	"Histoires de fesses"	3:25
17.	"Sentimentale"	3:16
18.	"Désenchantée"	12:09
19.	"Rêver"	6:53
20.	"Je te rends ton amour"	5:29
21.	"Fuck Them All/C'est dans l'air"	6:48
22.	"L'horloge"	7:39
23.	"Teaser" (bonus)	0:41
24.	"Bande annonce" (bonus)	1:05
Total length:		123:58

== Charts ==
=== Weekly charts ===
Weekly chart performance for Live 2019
Chart (2019)	Peak position
Belgian Albums (Ultratop Flanders)	47
Belgian Albums (Ultratop Wallonia)	1
French Albums (SNEP)	1
Swiss Albums (Schweizer Hitparade)	2
Swiss Albums (Schweizer Hitparade Romandy)	1

Weekly chart performance for Live 2019 Le Film
Chart (2019)	Peak position
French Music DVD (SNEP)	1
Swiss Music DVD (Schweizer Hitparade)	2

=== Year-end charts ===
Year-end chart performance for Live 2019
Chart (2019)	Position
Belgian Albums (Ultratop Wallonia)	39
French Albums (SNEP)	45

== Certifications ==
Certifications for Live 2019
Region	Certification	Certified units/sales
France (SNEP)	Platinum	100,000^{‡}
^{‡} Sales+streaming figures based on certification alone.

Certifications for Live 2019 Le Film
Region	Certification	Certified units/sales
France (SNEP)	Diamond	80,000

== Release history ==
Region	Date	Label	Format	Catalog
France	18 October 2019	Polydor	CD; LP	1 90759 85112 8; 1 90759 85121 0
France	6 December 2019	Polydor	DVD; Blu-ray	1 90759 85139 5; 1 94397 26539 2
