= Jen Jis =

French producer and songwriter

Antoine Chatenet, known professionally as Jen Jis, is a French producer and songwriter.

Based in Paris, Chatenet began his professional career writing and composing tracks for European artists. At the same time, he toured in China, Europe, US, and Canada with several other projects.

Chatenet created a global commercial sync for the perfume "Les Cascades de Rochas". After taking part in over 300 concerts, he returned from Asia, and as Jen Jis began working in his studio with dance music artists Point Point, Birdy Nam Nam, and Ed Banger DJs).

After a few months, Jen Jis travelled to Los Angeles, where he met many producers and worked on music with Jordan Young, a mixer and producer for The Chainsmokers, Oliver Heldens and Beyonce), to develop musical techniques suitable for the US market.

In 2018 Jen Jis came back to Europe, and teamed up with Feder (multi platinum DJ/producer based in France) in order to produce and release ‘Keep Us Apart’. He produced, songwrote and mixed for the Black Eyed Peas and Feder (his remix of Rita Ora). With Ofenbach he co-produced a number of singles and remixes for themselves and for Clean Bandit, Lauv and Anne Marie.

After signing a brand new deal with Spinnin, he released a single ‘These Boots are Made for Walking’ featuring the grammy nominated multi-platinum singer Melody Gardot. After this first collaboration they recorded a new track "Little Something" with Sting, released in 2020.

== List of works ==
=== Released on his own ===
- 2016: Freia - Call My Name (Jen Jis remix)
- 2016: Jen Jis - Women (feat. Lawrence Léa)
- 2017: Urban Cone - Old School (Jen Jis remix), 2015
- 2017: Jen Jis - 24 Hours Ago
- 2018: Haevn - Back In The Water (Jen Jis remix)
- 2018: Mylene Farmer - Rolling Stone (Jen Jis remix)
- 2018: Ofenbach - Paradise (Jen Jis remix)
- 2018: Jen Jis & Feder - Keep Us Apart (feat. Bright Sparks)
- 2018: The Parakit - Dam Dam (Jen Jis remix)
- 2019: Feder - Control (Jen Jis Remix)
- 2019: Jen Jis - These Boots Are Made For Walking (feat. Melody Gardot)

=== Works for other artist ===
- 2016: Joris Delacroix - Young and Brave (Rework / Ana Zimmer Edit)
- 2017: Ginkgoa - Boy Bounce
- 2018: Ginkgoa - One Time
- 2018: Clean Bandit & Demi Lovato - Solo (Ofenbach remix)
- 2019: Ofenbach - Rock It (certified gold in France) / Terrified / Paradise (certified gold in France)
- 2019: Lauv - fuck i'm lonely (feat. Anne-Marie) (Ofenbach remix)
- 2019: Ofenbach - Insane
- 2019: Rita Ora - Only Want You (Feder remix)
- 2020: The Parakit - Nova Girl
- 2020: L'August - Viens On Bouge / Minuit sur le Tel / 3 pour Moi / Thème Pauvre
- 2020: Dua Lipa - Physical (Ofenbach remix)
- 2020: Melody Gardot & Sting - Little Something
