= L'Emprise =

Studio album by Mylène Farmer
- Released: 25 November 2022
- Recorded: 2021–2022
- Studios: Studio Guillaume Tell, Paris
- Genres: Pop; electropop
- Length: 56:39
- Languages: French; English
- Label: Stuffed Monkey
- Producers: AaRON; Archive; Jerôme Devoise; Moby; Philip Larsen; Tanguy Destable; Woodkid

Mylène Farmer chronology
Plus grandir (2021)	L'Emprise (2022)	Remix XL (2024)

Singles from L'Emprise
- 1. "À tout jamais" Released: 26 August 2022; 2. "Rayon vert" Released: 4 November 2022; 3. "Rallumer les étoiles" Released: 13 January 2023; 4. "L'Emprise" Released: 22 March 2023

L'Emprise (English: Influence/ The Grip) is the twelfth studio album by French recording artist Mylène Farmer, released on 25 November 2022 by Stuffed Monkey. The album was produced by Yoann Lemoine, AaRON and Moby, among others. Described as a return to the darker instrumentation of her earlier records, L'Emprise is a concept album which deals with a person who is under psychological manipulation and breaks free from it. In Farmer's words: "Who has not crossed the path of a so-called narcissistic pervert? Who has not one day been under the influence ("l'emprise") of such a person? Feminine or masculine, it doesn't matter. Ultrasensitive beings inhabited by doubts that gnaw at them are ideal prey. The important thing is to identify it and try to combat this grip. It's a theme that upsets me and often puts me in a black rage."

L'Emprise received positive reviews from music critics, with many noting it as a return to form for Farmer. Reviewers generally praised the album's cohesiveness and melancholic atmosphere, but some lamented the absence of radio-friendly songs.

Commercially, the album was successful, achieving the gold status in France (50,000 copies sold) within the first week of its release. The album also peaked at number one in France, Wallonia, and Switzerland, making it Farmer's first release to do so.

The album spawned four singles: "À tout jamais", "Rayon vert" featuring French duo AaRON, "Rallumer les étoiles, and the title track "L'Emprise". To further support the album, Farmer embarked on her Nevermore 2023 tour, her first tour since 2019 and the first one to play completely in stadiums.

== Background and recording ==
Following the announcement of the Nevermore 2023 stadium tour, several news outlets speculated that a new studio album would be released to coincide with the tour. In the spring of 2022, media outlets detailed that Farmer was working on a new record with Woodkid and Moby as well as the bands Archive and AaRON. The singer had previously collaborated with Moby and Archive on the 2010 album Bleu noir.

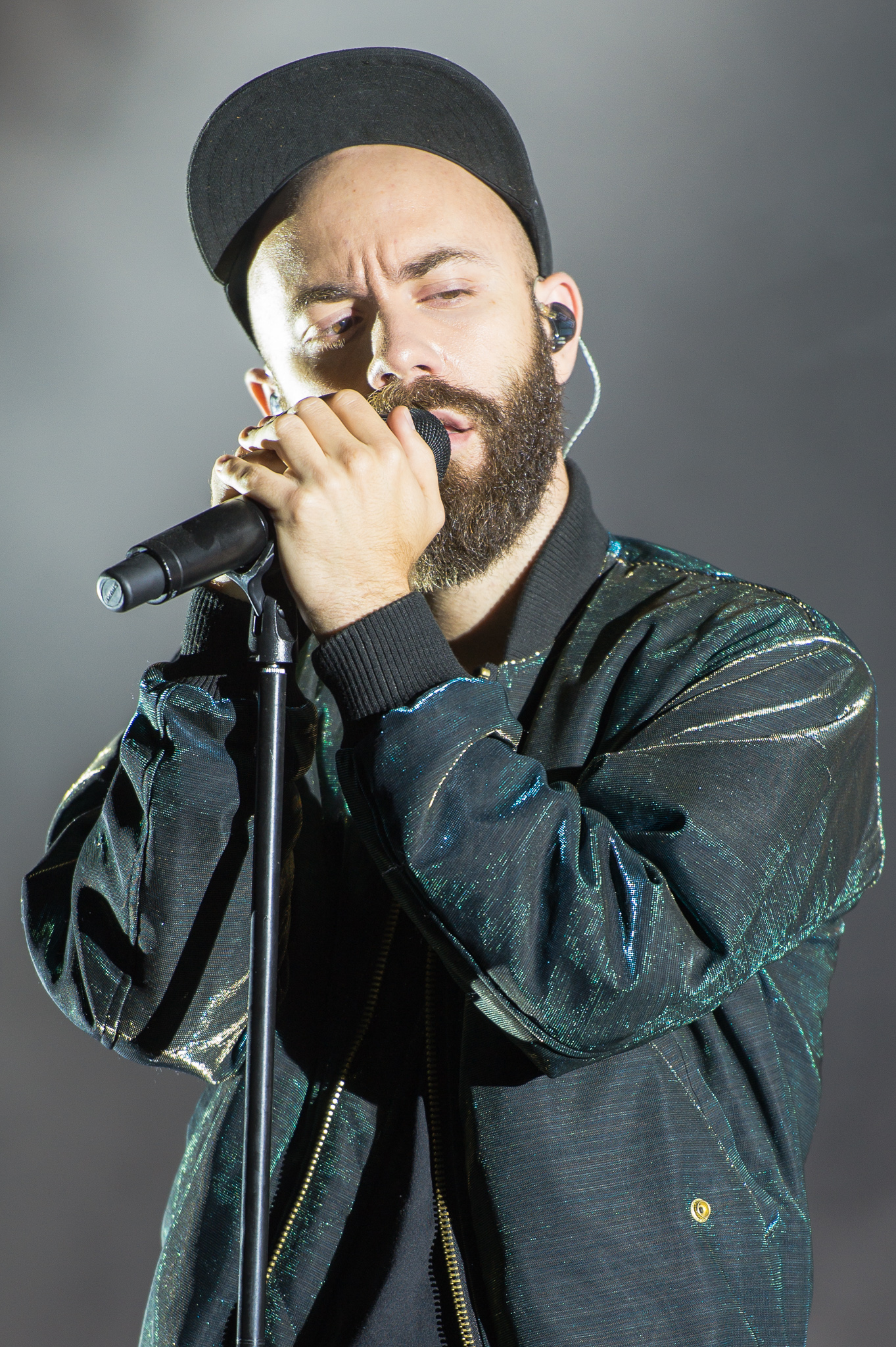
French singer-songwriter Woodkid composed and produced 8 songs on the album.

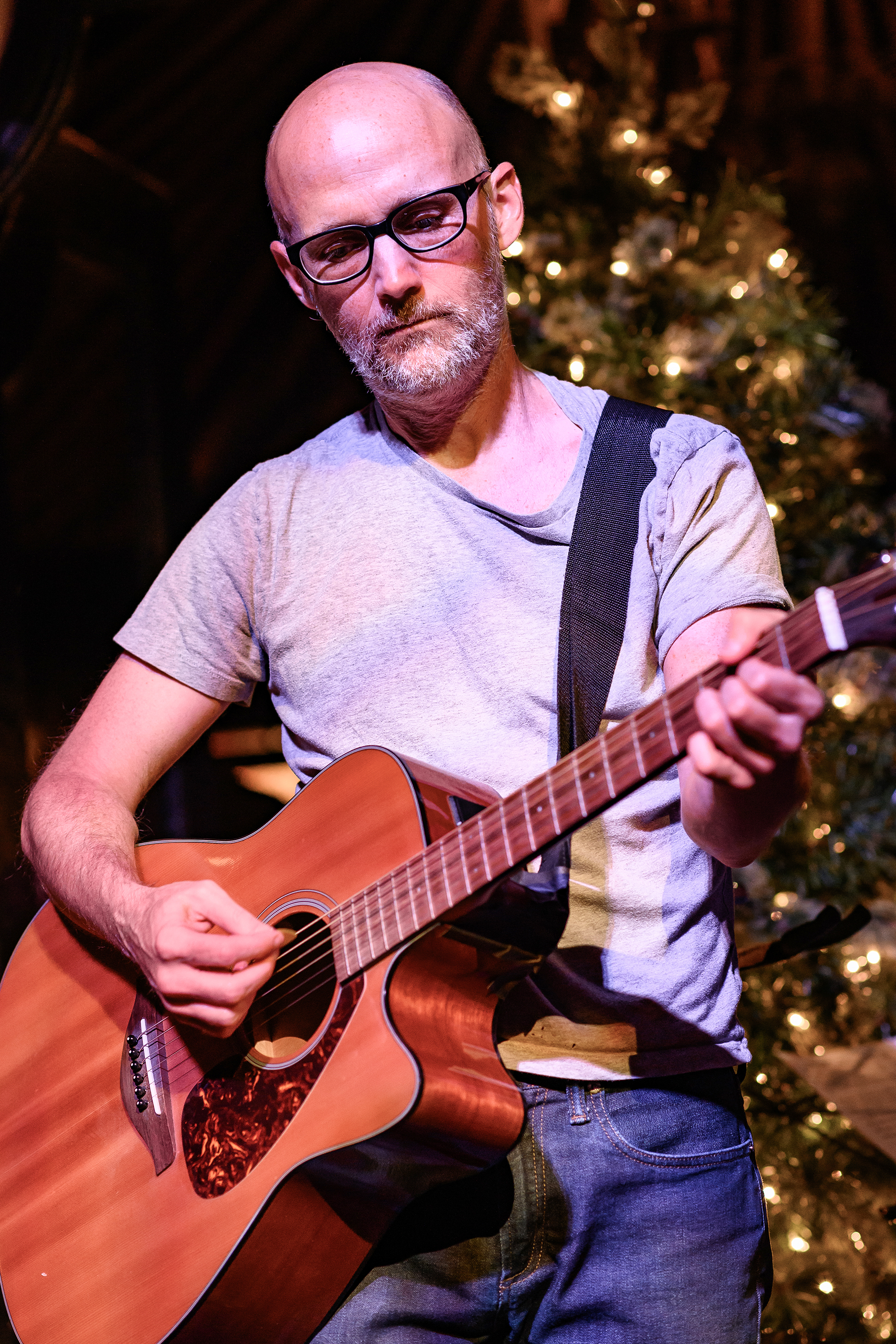
Electronic musician Moby produced 2 songs on the album.

According to Farmer, Lemoine approached her with the idea of collaborating after "she had long wanted to approach him". Lemoine sent her songs from his second studio album S16 in 2020 and the two struck up a friendship soon after. Work on the album commenced in 2021 and lasted a year. Lemoine would first compose the music and melody and send it to Farmer with his own voice, who would then write the lyrics. Meanwhile, Farmer and Moby worked on two songs remotely. The recording of the album took place at Studio Guillaume Tell in Paris, in the presence of a symphonic orchestra.

== Composition and lyrics ==
L'Emprise is a pop record which incorporates synth-pop, electropop, new wave and baroque pop influences. The instrumentation features predominately violins, synths and drums.

The album opens with "Invisibles", a symphonic ballad that was the first song composed for the album. Lyrically, it deals with religious love. The second song, lead single "À tout jamais" is a mid-tempo electropop song which "sounds like a call to get out of control". The lyrics are addressed to a narcissistic person. Jean Blaquière for Sud Ouest noted that the album's release coincided with the International Day for the Elimination of Violence against Women, alluding that the lyrics, especially those of the lead single and "L'Emprise", deal with power dynamics in a relationship. The third song, "Que l'aube est belle", is a ballad that features ornamental orchestration, while its lyrics deal with Farmer's anxieties observing the world. Exploring the power dynamics of relationships and the darker aspects of human nature, the title track has been compared to lead single "À tout jamais", both sonically and lyrically. "Do You Know Who I Am" is a downtempo electropop song in which Farmer "recounts the harsh observation of having been too faded in favor of the other". The sixth song, "Rallumer les étoiles" is an up-tempo song featuring new wave instrumentation. Exploring themes that are characteristic of Farmer's work, the song deals with God, angels and love, and references Guillaume Apollinaire's play The Breasts of Tiresias. Critics noted its similarity to Eurythmics, Farmer's 2010 song "Bleu noir" and Moby's 1999 album Play.

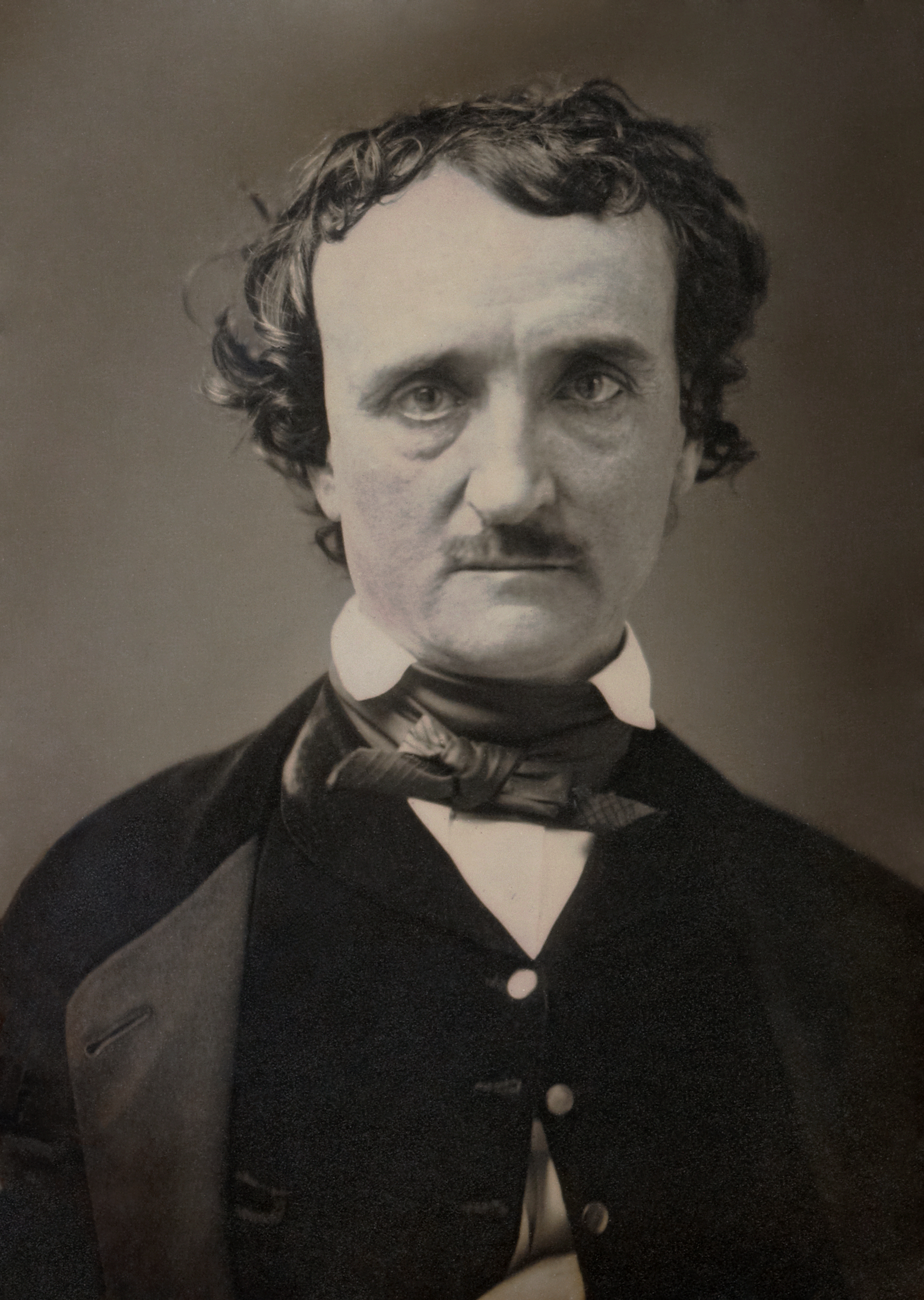
Edgar Allan Poe is evoked in the song "Que je devienne..." and serves as an inspiration for Farmer's 2023 concert tour entitled Nevermore.

Written by French pop duo, "Rayon vert" is a synth-pop song, in which Farmer and Simon Buret sing about being alone on an asteroid. The eighth song, "Ode à l'apesanteur", is a piano-driven ballad. The next song, "Que je devienne..." is a Gothic ballad with a complex instrumentation consisting of violins, drums, church bells, and a choir. Sonically compared to a lament and Bond ballads, Farmer addresses Stefan Zweig, Charles Baudelaire, Emily Dickinson and Edgar Allan Poe and sings of becoming their muse. The lyrics also evoke Farmer's song "Jardin de Vienne" from her 1988 album Ainsi soit je.... "Ne plus renaître" is a downtempo electronic rock song, which features an interpolation of Farmer's song "Ave Maria" from her 2008 album Point de suture. The eleventh song, "D'un autre part" is a mid-tempo ballad featuring both electronic and symphonic instrumentation. Sonically, it has drawn comparisons to the tracks "Á tout jamais" and "L'Emprise". The closing track of the standard version of the album, "Bouteille à la mer" is a hopeful uptempo song in which Farmer sings of "her thirst to live intensely".

== Release and artwork ==
On 24 August, it was officially announced that the lead single "À tout jamais" would be released on 26 August 2022. On 13 October, billboards with the singer appeared at several train stations in Paris and other major cities across France. The title, as well as the release date, were announced by CNews the same evening: the album would be called L'Emprise and would be released on 25 November 2022. On 18 October, the album cover was presented and pre-orders were opened.

L'Emprise was finally released on 25 November 2022. The album was made available in four physical formats: the standard edition, a limited edition CD coversleeve, CD collector grand format, and double LP. Physical editions were available for pre-order through Fnac and Amazon France.

The artwork features Farmer as a three-dimensional avatar in fetal position. 3D scanning was employed to capture Farmer, made by French studio Scan Engine. Woodkid designed the avatar on the album cover and in the booklet, where the figure of Farmer is seen losing a shell-like structure, in accordance with the album's narrative of overcoming manipulation and gaining power over oneself.

== Singles ==
Three singles were released in promotion of the album. "À tout jamais" served as the lead single on 26 August 2022, with the audio premiering on Farmer's YouTube channel and streaming services on that day. It received critical acclaim from music critics for its production and strong lyrics. Têtu noted that the single marked a return to the "Gothic" soundscape of Farmer's career beginnings and deemed it a break-up song. On 12 September 2022, Farmer's birthday, the music video was unveiled. Directed by German filmmaker Tobias Gremmler, the video features a 3D-scanned Farmer performing choreographed moves as she is embraced by silhouettes. Commercially, the song performed moderately on the record charts, peaking at number 10 on the French physical + digital chart, while it failed to enter the main chart. However, the song performed well on the French airplay chart, peaking at number 28.

"Rayon vert", duet with French band AaRON, was released as the album's second single.

The second single, "Rayon vert" featuring AaRON was released on 4 November 2022. Critics reacted to the song positively, mentioning that the production and AaRON's lyrics blend successfully into Farmer's usual soundscape, however, upon the release of the album, some critics noted that the song was an outlier with its electronic production. Its accompanying music video, shot by François Hanss, was released on 14 November 2022. The video features Farmer and AaRON member Simon Buret travelling in a spaceship, while fellow band member Olivier Coursier assumes the role of a butler who serves them some kind of blue liquid. At the end of the video, the singers encounter extraterrestrial life. The video received positive critical reaction and was favourably compared to the science fiction films Melancholia, 2001: A Space Odyssey and Arrival. Commercially, the single underperformed on the French radio and video charts. A remix EP was released on 24 February 2023.

"Rallumer les étoiles" was released as the third single in support of the album on 13 January 2023. A new edit of the song was sent to radio stations and premiered on digital platforms the same day. Its accompanying music video was released on 14 February 2023.

== Critical reception ==
L'Emprise received generally positive reviews from music critics. Critics positively commented on the album's cohesion, lyrics and composition, but some noted that the album lacked stand-out songs. Michel Troadec for Ouest-France named L'Emprise as one of Farmer's best albums, highlighting her clear and pure voice. According to Natalie Grosskopf for La Voix du Nord, L'Emprise is Farmer's best body of work since her 1999 album Innamoramento. Grosskopf praised Woodkid's composition, which "matches" Farmer's universe well, and complimented Farmer's voice, which sounds "even more serious than before, still seeks high notes that make you shiver." Luc Lorfèvre for Moustique also complimented Woodkid's production and its compatibility with Farmer's artistry.

In a more mixed review, Jean Blaquière for Sud Ouest commended Farmer's lyrics and the coherence of the album, but noted that L'Emprise lacks really striking songs. Anne-Sophie Jahn for Le Point praised the complexity of Farmer's lyrics, highlighting that the words deal with "control, adrenaline, desire, the disappearance of self." However, she identified that the album sounds monotonous and it lacks hit songs. Similarly, Pure Charts noted the lack of popular hits and criticised Moby's production as dated.

== Commercial performance ==
Upon its release, L'Emprise debuted at number one in three Francophone countries: France, Belgium (Wallonia) and Switzerland, making it Farmer's 13th number-one album in France, and first number-one album in Switzerland. This also marks the first time one of Farmer's albums reaches number one in three different countries.

In France, the album sold 72,556 album-equivalent units in its first week, which constituted the 4th best debut sales in 2022, and the best debut in pure album sales of that year. After its debut, the album maintained strong sales and remained at number two for four consecutive weeks on the French albums chart. On 12 December 2022, L'Emprise was certified platinum for selling over 100,000 album-equivalent units. The album also went on to become the 12th best-selling album of 2022 in the country.

In Belgium (Wallonia), L'Emprise spent three consecutive weeks at number one on the Ultratop Albums chart, and spent seven consecutive weeks in the top ten. It went on to become the 19th best-selling album of 2022 in the country.

== Track listing ==
Credits adapted from album liner notes.

All lyrics are written by Mylène Farmer except where noted; all music is composed by Woodkid except where noted.

L'Emprise standard edition
No.	Title	Lyrics	Music	Producer(s)	Length
1.	"Invisibles"			Woodkid; Tepr	3:35
2.	"À tout jamais"			Woodkid; Tepr	3:46
3.	"Que l'aube est belle"			Woodkid; Tepr	5:08
4.	"L'Emprise"			Woodkid; Tepr	3:54
5.	"Do You Know Who I Am"	Mylène Farmer	Darius Keeler	Archive; Jerôme Devoise	4:03
6.	"Rallumer les étoiles"	Farmer	Moby	Moby	4:24
7.	"Rayon vert" (with AaRON)	Olivier Coursier; Simon Buret	Coursier; Buret	AaRON	3:45
8.	"Ode à l'apesanteur"			Woodkid; Tepr	3:32
9.	"Que je devienne..."			Woodkid; Tepr	4:14
10.	"Ne plus renaître"			Archive; Devoise	6:06
11.	"D'un autre part"	Farmer	Woodkid; Tepr	Woodkid; Tepr	3:12
12.	"Bouteille à la mer"	Farmer	Moby; Armen Paul; Dimitri Ehrlich; Pete Gordeno	Moby; Philip Larsen	4:16
13.	"Rayon vert" (with AaRON; Piano/Voice)	Coursier; Buret	Coursier; Buret	AaRON	3:12
14.	"Invisibles" (Piano/Voice)			Woodkid; Tepr	3:32
Total length:					56:39

== Personnel ==
Credits adapted from album liner notes.

- Mylène Farmer – vocals
- Woodkid – producer (1–4, 8–9, 11), string arrangements (1, 3–4, 8–9, 11), visuals
- Sally Herbert – string arrangements, conductor (1, 3–4, 8–9, 11)
- Tanguy Destable – additional producer (1–3, 8–9)
- Yvan Cassar – piano (8, 14)
- Doriane Gable – violin
- David Braccini – concert‐master
- Béatrice Muttelet – viola
- Eric Maria Couturier – cello
- Raphaël Perraud – cello
- Darius Keeler – synths, sound effects and programming (5, 10)
- Danny Griffiths – synths, sound effects and programming (5, 10)
- Jon Noyce – bass (5, 10)
- Dave Pen – guitars (5, 10)
- Graham Peskett – piano (5, 10)
- Steve "Smiley" Barnard – drums (5, 10)
- Pollard Berrier – backing vocals (5, 10)
- Moby – producer (6, 12)
- Philip Larsen – producer, mixing, additional keyboards (12)
- AaRON (Simon Buret and Olivier Coursier) – producer, mixing, piano and electronic drums (7, 13)
- Jérôme Devoise – mixing (1–11, 14)
- Mike Marsh – mastering
- Scan Engine – 3D capturing and modelling
- Rægular – graphics
- Robin Pitchon – logo calligraphy

== Charts ==
=== Weekly charts ===
Weekly chart performance for L'Emprise
Chart (2022)	Peak position
Belgian Albums (Ultratop Flanders)	47
Belgian Albums (Ultratop Wallonia)	1
French Albums (SNEP)	1
Swiss Albums (Schweizer Hitparade)	1
Swiss Albums (Romandie)	1
UK Album Downloads (Official Charts)	42

=== Year-end charts ===
2022 year-end chart performance for L'Emprise
Chart (2022)	Position
Belgian Albums (Ultratop Wallonia)	19
French Albums (SNEP)	11
Swiss Albums (Schweizer Hitparade)	68

2023 year-end chart performance for L'Emprise
Chart (2023)	Position
French Albums (SNEP)	84
Belgian Albums (Ultratop Wallonia)	96

== Certifications ==
Certifications for L'Emprise
Region	Certification	Certified units/sales
France (SNEP)	2× Platinum	200,000^{‡}
^{‡} Sales+streaming figures based on certification alone.

== Release history ==
Release dates and formats for L'Emprise
Region	Date	Format	Label	Ref.
Various	25 November 2022	Digital download; streaming	Stuffed Monkey (Sony Music)	
France	25 November 2022	CD; LP	Stuffed Monkey (Sony Music)	
