= Interstellaires =

Studio album by Mylène Farmer
- Released: 6 November 2015
- Genres: Electronica, synth-pop
- Length: 40:07
- Label: Polydor
- Producers: Martin Kierszenbaum, The Avener

Mylène Farmer chronology
Timeless 2013 (2013)	Interstellaires (2015)	Désobéissance (2018)

Singles from Interstellaires
- 1. "Stolen Car" Released: 28 August 2015; 2. "Insondables (promo)" Released: 28 October 2015; 3. "City of Love" Released: 8 January 2016; 4. "C'est pas moi" Released: 13 June 2016

Interstellaires is the tenth studio album by French singer-songwriter Mylène Farmer. It was released on 6 November 2015 in France by Polydor Records. It is produced by Martin Kierszenbaum and The Avener.

The album received generally positive reviews from critics, who praised its catchy songs, modern sound, and calmer vocals, though a few found it lacking in innovation.

== Singles ==
On 18 August 2015, a new temporary site was launched, presenting a countdown whose timer was set to end on 28 August 2015, announcing Farmer's return with a brand new record. Its background pictured Farmer and British singer Sting, indicating a collaboration. On 28 August 2015, their single "Stolen Car" was available on iTunes. It is a new version of a song which was originally released on Sting's 2003 Sacred Love album, Farmer's and Sting's duet hit number one on the French chart.

A promo single "Insondables", was released on 28 October 2015.

"City of Love" was released as the second single of the album on 8 January 2016, followed by a remix by Martin Kierszenbaum featuring Shaggy in February 2016, also peaking at number one on the French chart.

== Release and promotion ==
On 16 September 2015, French magazine Gala announced Farmer's upcoming studio album title. It was then officially confirmed on 16 September 2015 by the singer's recording label, Polydor, through its Facebook page. Another temporaneous site was then launched with a timer set to the album release, as previously done with the "Stolen Car" single. Its layout pictured a nebula with flowing stars in the background and a deep, loud noise added, just like the one that could have already been heard with "Stolen Car"'s site, possibly matching the album core theme.

== Commercial reception ==
On the chart edition of 14 November 2015, Interstellaires debuted at number one on the French Album chart, performing which was then the highest weekly sales of 2015 in France, with 109,971 sales, including 6,153 downloads. The next week, the album dropped to number three with 26,944 sales. At the same date, the album debuted at number one in the francophone part of Belgium (Wallonia), then dropped to number two. In both countries, it was dislodged by Johnny Hallyday's new studio album De l'amour. Interstellaires entered at a peak of number 21 in Flanders, which became the highest position for one of the singer's albums on that chart, and also charted in Germany and the Netherlands, where it peaked at number 79 and in Greece at number 70. Interstellaires also marked Farmer's debut on a Billboard chart, reaching number 9 on the World Chart.

== Track listing ==
All tracks are written by Mylène Farmer and Martin Kierszenbaum except where noted.

No.	Title	Writer(s)	Producer(s)	Length
1.	"Interstellaires"		Kierszenbaum	3:11
2.	"Stolen Car" (with Sting)	Farmer; Sting	The Avener	3:22
3.	"À rebours"		Kierszenbaum	4:11
4.	"C'est pas moi"		Kierszenbaum	3:41
5.	"Insondables"		Kierszenbaum	2:37
6.	"Love Song"		Kierszenbaum	4:33
7.	"Pas d'access"		Kierszenbaum	3:17
8.	"I Want You to Want Me" (Cheap Trick cover)	Rick Nielsen	Kierszenbaum	3:05
9.	"Voie lactée"		Kierszenbaum	3:17
10.	"City of Love"	Farmer; Kierszenbaum; Matthew Koma	Kierszenbaum	4:26
11.	"Un jour ou l'autre"		Kierszenbaum	4:27

== Charts ==
=== Weekly charts ===
Chart (2015)	Peak position
Belgian Albums (Ultratop Flanders)	21
Belgian Albums (Ultratop Wallonia)	1
Czech Albums (ČNS IFPI)	41
Dutch Albums (Album Top 100)	79
French Albums (SNEP)	1
German Albums (Offizielle Top 100)	79
Greek Albums (IFPI)	70
Swiss Albums (Schweizer Hitparade)	3
Swiss Albums (Schweizer Hitparade Romandy)	1
US World Albums (Billboard)	9

=== Year-end charts ===
Chart (2015)	Position
Belgian Albums (Ultratop Wallonia)	16
French Albums (SNEP)	11
Swiss Albums (Schweizer Hitparade)	89

Chart (2016)	Position
Belgian Albums (Ultratop Wallonia)	46
French Albums (SNEP)	108

== Certifications and sales ==
Region	Certification	Certified units/sales
Belgium (BRMA)	Gold	15,000^{*}
France (SNEP)	3× Platinum	350,000
^{*} Sales figures based on certification alone.

== Release history ==
Date	Label	Country	Format
6 November 2015	Polydor	France	CD, double LP
