= À tout jamais =

Single by Mylène Farmer

from the album L'Emprise
- Language: French; English
- Released: 26 August 2022
- Genre: Electropop
- Length: 3:46
- Label: Stuffed Monkey (Sony Music)
- Composer: Yoann Lemoine
- Lyricist: Mylène Farmer
- Producers: Woodkid, Tanguy Destable

Mylène Farmer singles chronology
| "L'âme dans l'eau" (2020) | "À tout jamais" (2022) | "Rayon vert" (2022) |

Music video
- "À tout jamais" on YouTube

"À tout jamais" (English: Forever) is a song recorded by French singer Mylène Farmer for her twelfth studio album, L'Emprise. The song was written by Farmer in collaboration with French musician Woodkid.

The song was released as the lead single on 26 August 2022.

== Critical reception ==
Léna Lutaud from Le Figaro stated that "À tout jamais" is a dark and light song at the same time, in it Farmer renews herself, returning to her early gothic roots, she also called this song a very successful first single. Margaux Bonfils of France Info called the song "a dark ultramodern electropop revelation, a requiem to start all over again".

== Music video ==
The official music video was directed by Tobias Gremmler. It was released on 12 September 2022.

== Track listing ==
Digital download and streaming

1. "À tout jamais" – 3:46

CD maxi

1. "À tout jamais" (Version Single)
2. "À tout jamais" (NPD'S Remix)
3. "À tout jamais" (D Remix - Distortion Remix)
4. "À tout jamais" (MM Remix - Master Manipulation Remix)
5. "À tout jamais" (Control Remix)
6. "À tout jamais" (Version Instrumentale)

LP maxi

A1. "À tout jamais" (NPD'S Remix)
A2. "À tout jamais" (MM Remix - Master Manipulation Remix)
B1. "À tout jamais" (D Remix - Distortion Remix)
B2. "À tout jamais" (Control Remix)
B3. "À tout jamais" (Version Single)

== Charts ==
=== Weekly charts ===
Weekly chart performance for "À tout jamais"
| Chart (2022) | Peak position |
|---|---|
| Belgium (Ultratop 50 Wallonia) | 18 |
| France (SNEP) | 10 |
| France Airplay (SNEP) | 31 |

=== Year-end charts ===
Year-end chart performance for "À tout jamais"
| Chart (2022) | Position |
|---|---|
| Belgium (Ultratop 50 Wallonia) | 166 |

== Release history ==
Release dates and formats for "À tout jamais"
| Region | Date | Format | Label | Ref. |
|---|---|---|---|---|
| Various | 26 August 2022 | Digital download; streaming | Stuffed Monkey (Sony Music) | |
| France | 30 September 2022 | CD; LP | Stuffed Monkey (Sony Music) | |
