= Mylène Farmer =

French recording artist

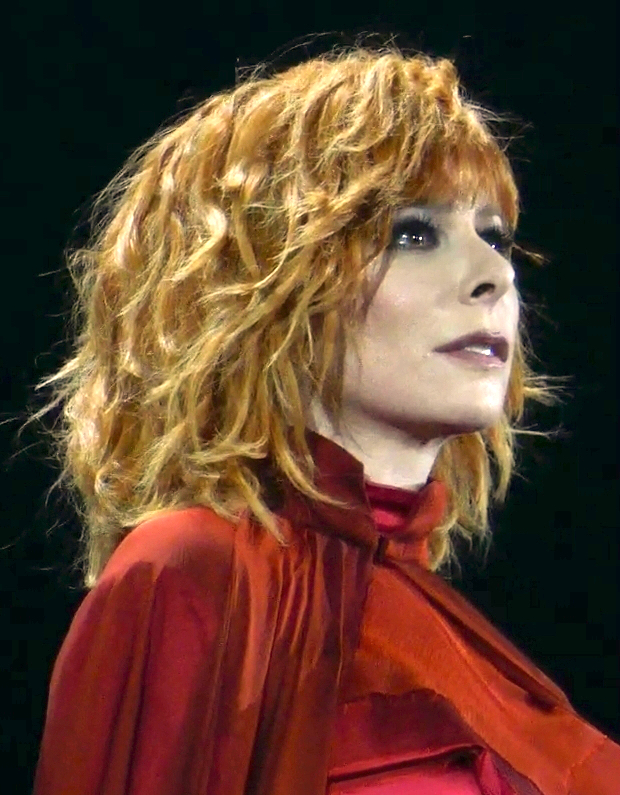
- Farmer in 2019
- Born: Mylène Jeanne Gautier; 12 September 1961 (age 65); Pierrefonds, Quebec, Canada
- Citizenship: France; Canada
- Occupations: Singer; songwriter; record producer
- Years active: 1984–present
- Awards: 9 NRJ Music Awards; 2 World Music Awards
- Musical career
- Genres: French pop; rock; dance; electronic
- Instrument: Vocals
- Labels: Polydor; Sony Music

Mylène Jeanne Gautier (French pronunciation: [milɛn ʒan ɡotje]; born 12 September 1961), known professionally as Mylène Farmer (pronounced [milɛn faʁmœʁ]), is a French singer-songwriter and record producer. Having sold more than 35 million records worldwide, she is among the most successful recording artists of all time in France, where she holds the record for the most number one hit singles, with twenty-one – eight of which were consecutive.

Born in Pierrefonds, Quebec, Canada (a former city now part of the Montreal borough of Pierrefonds-Roxboro), to French parents, the family soon relocated to Chaville, near Paris, where Farmer pursued a career in modelling and acting. She later gained prominence as a recording artist with the release of her debut single "Maman a tort" in 1984. In 1988, she released her second studio album, Ainsi soit je..., which sold 1.5 million copies in France. The album spawned Farmer's first number one on the French singles chart, "Pourvu qu'elles soient douces". Her third studio album, L'autre..., sold two million copies, becoming Farmer's best-selling album to date. Its lead single, "Désenchantée", became Farmer's most successful single, and is often described as her signature song.

Departing from the synth-pop and Europop soundscape of her first albums, Farmer reinvented her musical style with the release of her fourth studio album, Anamorphosée, in 1995. Recorded in the United States, the album features more live instrumentation and shows rock and R&B-oriented influences. Her fifth studio album, Innamoramento, was released in 1999, featuring more electronic influences. In the second part of the 2000s, Farmer continued exploring a range of genres on her albums, namely acoustic pop music on Avant que l'ombre... and electronica on Point de suture.

In 2010, Farmer released her eighth studio album, Bleu noir. The album marked Farmer's return to the dark synth-pop and Europop production of her first albums. The lead single, "Oui mais... non", sold over 130,000 copies in France. In 2015, Farmer's tenth studio album, Interstellaires, debuted at number one in France; the album was preceded by the lead single "Stolen Car", a duet with Sting, which reached the number one position on the French singles chart in September 2015. Her eleventh studio album, Désobéissance, was released in 2018, debuting at number one and selling over 265.000 copies.

In addition to her music career, Farmer also worked as a lyricist for French singer Alizée, while also being responsible for her image and public appearances. Her debut single, "Moi... Lolita", co-written by Farmer, reached number one in several countries in Europe, and peaked at number nine on the UK Singles Chart in February 2002. Farmer made her film debut in 1994, starring in Giorgino, and in 2018, she starred in the English-language horror film Ghostland.

Throughout her career, Farmer has broken a number of records. She is one of the best-selling French singer since 1984, has a record number of diamond records, and she is the only artist to have obtained a diamond album in four consecutive decades. Selling over two million copies, her 2001 greatest hits album Les Mots is the highest-selling compilation album by a French recording artist.

== Biography and career ==
=== 1961–1983: early years and career beginnings ===
Having been born in Canada, her family relocated to France when Farmer was eight years old. When she first arrived in France, she took speech classes after her school declared her Québécois accent to be "improper". At the age of 17, Farmer discovered acting and undertook a three-year course at the Cours Florent, a drama school in Paris. Changing her name to Mylène Farmer as a tribute to her idol, 1930s Hollywood actress Frances Farmer, she began to earn a living as a model acting in several TV adverts, such as those for IKEA, Fiskars and Caisse d'Epargne. Farmer also appeared in a local stage production of Le père Noël est une ordure.

In 1984, Farmer met Laurent Boutonnat, a young film student, after answering a newspaper advert for an actress for a small film project he was working on. Farmer and Boutonnat became friends and forged a creative partnership, writing and producing the music. Boutonnat, whose ambition was to become a film director, became the creative force behind Farmer's videos. In 1984, Farmer recorded and released the song "Maman a tort", written by Boutonnat and Jérôme Dahan. The trio continued to work together on what would become Farmer's first studio album.

=== 1984–1992: Cendres de lune, Ainsi soit je... and L'autre... ===
Farmer's debut studio album, Cendres de lune, was released in 1986. During the recording process, it was decided that Farmer would write lyrics and Boutonnat would write music and direct the music videos. "Libertine" was released as the lead single of the album, accompanied by a music video in the style of a short film, inspired by 19th century literature.

In 1988, Boutonnat and Farmer started work on her second album, Ainsi soit je.... The album sold 1.5 million copies in France and spawned Farmer's first number one on the French singles chart, "Pourvu qu'elles soient douces". The album also features the songs "Sans contrefaçon" and the Juliette Gréco cover "Déshabillez-moi". Ainsi soit je... was the best-selling female album of the 1980s in France.

Following the positive response to small-scale concerts at the Palais de Sport, Farmer agreed to embark on a 50-date tour throughout francophone Europe in 1989. The tour saw Farmer play in arenas and featured dancers and outfits designed by French fashion designer Thierry Mugler. A live album documenting the tour was released at the end of that year, titled En Concert.

Farmer released the song "Désenchantée" in March 1991. An uptempo pop song, "Désenchantée" talks about a disillusioned generation. The song was preceded by a number of demonstrations in Paris, led by high-school students, who were "protest[ing] against overcrowded classrooms, inadequate security and too few teachers". The song ended up spending nine weeks atop the French singles chart, becoming Farmer's most successful single to date and her signature song. The song was also successful in Belgium, where it spent six weeks at number one, and it was a top ten hit in several European countries. Its accompanying music video, shot in Budapest, sees Farmer play a rebelling prisoner in a concentration camp.

Led by the success of "Désenchantée", L'autre... was released in April 1991. The album spent twenty consecutive weeks on top of the French album charts, becoming Farmer's best-selling studio album to date with two million copies sold. The album also charted in Switzerland, Sweden and Germany. To further promote the album, the singles "Regrets", "Je t'aime mélancolie" and "Beyond My Control" were released.

1992 saw the release of the remix compilation Dance Remixes. It was led by the single "Que mon cœur lâche", which deals with the topic of AIDS and sexual relations. It was accompanied by a video directed by Luc Besson, in which Farmer plays an angel sent down to earth by God to report on the changing ways people experience love.

=== 1995–2000: Anamorphosée and Innamoramento ===
In 1994, Farmer starred in the film Giorgino, written and directed by Boutonnat. The film received mixed-to-negative reviews from critics and was a box-office bomb. Following this, Farmer relocated to Los Angeles.

While in the U.S., Farmer and Boutonnat started working on her fourth studio album, Anamorphosée. The album marked an artistic turn for Farmer, moving away from her early synth-pop music in favour of pop rock, R&B and new jack swing influences. The album was launched by "XXL", the music video of which was directed by Marcus Nispel and features Farmer strapped to the front of a moving train. To further promote the album, the singles "L'Instant X", "California", "Comme j'ai mal" and "Rêver" were released. The music video for "California" was directed by American filmmaker Abel Ferrara and features Farmer in a dual role. The album differs lyrically from Farmer's previous work: "Rêver" deals with the Holocaust and features a call for tolerance, "XXL" talks about universal love from a feminist perspective, and "L'Instant X" offers a humorous look at the end of the world.

In summer 1996, Farmer embarked on her second concert tour, during which she performed 21 shows in arenas around France, Belgium and Switzerland. Inspired by American concert tours, Farmer performed the majority of songs from Anamorphosée, songs from her previous studio albums, and a cover of "La Poupée qui fait non" with French singer Khaled. The corresponding live album, Live à Bercy, was released in May 1997.

Farmer released her fifth studio album Innamoramento in 1999. The album was preceded by "L'Âme-stram-gram", an uptempo techno song with a music video inspired by the film A Chinese Ghost Story. Both the single and the album reached the second position on the French charts. The music video for the second single, "Je te rends ton amour", sparked controversy because of its religious and transgressive imagery, and was censored by French TV channel M6. Consequently, the video was released on VHS, with the profits donated to French charity Sidaction to support HIV/AIDS research. Furthermore, the singles "Souviens-toi du jour", "Optimistique-moi" and "Innamoramento" were released in promotion of the album.

In late 1999, Farmer embarked on her third concert tour, the Mylenium Tour. The stage of the show featured aerial structures and a pharaonic statue at the centre of the stage. Farmer performed 42 shows in total, including three shows in Russia, her first concerts in a non-French-speaking country. The tour concluded in March 2000.

=== 2000–2007: Alizée, Les mots and Avant que l'ombre... ===
In 2000, Farmer and Boutonnat started working on songs and video ideas they felt appropriate for a younger singer. They discovered Alizée Jacotey on the French television show Graines de stars. Farmer and Boutonnat wrote and produced Alizée's albums Gourmandises (2001) and Mes courants électriques (2003). In addition, Farmer was also responsible for Alizée's image and public appearances. Her debut single, "Moi... Lolita", written by Farmer, reached number one in several countries in Europe, and peaked at number nine on the UK Singles Chart in February 2002. It also went on to sell more than one million copies in France. In 2005, after two albums and a concert tour, Alizée amicably parted ways with the duo to work with different songwriters and producers.

In 2001, Farmer recorded "L'Histoire d'une fée, c'est..." for the animated film Rugrats in Paris: The Movie. At the end of the year, Universal released Farmer's first greatest hits collection: Les Mots. Les Mots was the best-selling album of 2001 and 2002, and remains the best-selling greatest hits album in France with more than 1.5 million copies sold. The album also featured new tracks, including the title track, a duet with British singer Seal, "C'est une belle journée" and "Pardonne-moi".

After a hiatus of four years, Farmer held a press conference in 2005, announcing her new album, Avant que l'ombre..., the single "Fuck Them All", as well as a special 13-night concert engagement at the Palais Omnisports de Paris-Bercy in January 2006. The residency in Bercy featured a complex set designed by Mark Fisher, including two stages, a mobile bridge to link the two stages and a water curtain used to project words and the singer's silhouette. A live album and a concert DVD, Avant que l'ombre... à Bercy, were released in December 2006.

Following this, Farmer and American electronic musician Moby worked on the French-language duet version of the singer's song "Slipping Away", with the French lyrics translated by Farmer herself. In 2007, Farmer recorded a song "Devant soi" for the soundtrack of the film Jacquou le Croquant, and worked as a voice actress in Luc Besson's animated feature Arthur and the Minimoys, lending her voice to Princess Selenia. Farmer would later reprise her role in the film's two sequels.

=== 2008–2014: Point de suture, Bleu noir and Monkey Me ===
Farmer's seventh studio album, Point de Suture, was released on 25 August 2008, debuting at number one on the French album chart. Along with its lead single "Dégénération", the album features more electronic instrumentation and is predominately uptempo. Other singles released from the album include "Appelle mon numéro" and "C'est dans l'air", both of which charted at number one on the French singles chart.

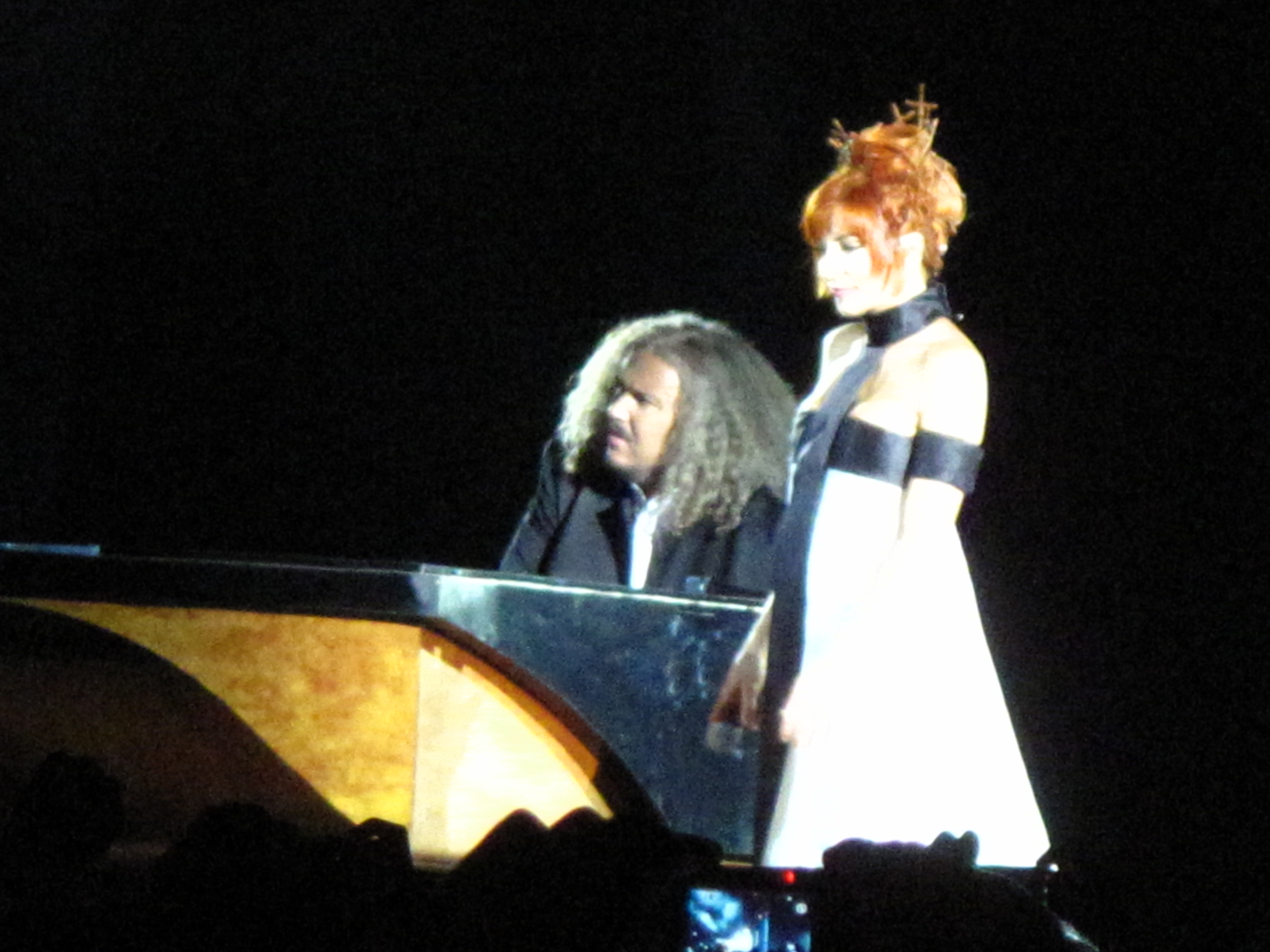
Farmer on stage at Stade de France during her 2009 concert tour.

Following the release of the album, Farmer embarked on her fifth concert tour entitled Mylène Farmer en tournée. The tour saw Farmer play in stadiums for the first time in her career, giving concerts at the Stade de France, Stade de Genève and King Baudouin Stadium, as well as a number of arenas in France and Russia. A live album, N°5 on Tour, was released on 7 December 2009, which was followed by a DVD of her Stade de France concerts.

Farmer recorded a duet with French Chanson singer Line Renaud entitled "C'est pas l'heure". In November 2010, Farmer recorded her vocals for a cover of "Never Tear Us Apart" with Ben Harper for Australian band INXS's album Original Sin.

2010 also saw the release of Farmer's eighth studio album, Bleu noir. Produced by RedOne, Moby and British alternative band Archive, it entered the French album chart at number one and remained at the top for three consecutive weeks. It was the 9th best-selling album in France in 2010, with more than 300,000 copies sold in only three weeks. "Oui mais... non", the album's lead single was released in October 2010 and went on to become the singer's most successful single since 2002. In promotion of the album, the singles "Bleu Noir" and "Lonely Lisa" were released.

Farmer's second greatest hits collection, titled 2001.2011, was released in late 2011, featuring all singles recorded after 2001's Les Mots, and a new single titled "Du temps".

In early 2012, Farmer said that she was recording a new album which was to be released late 2012. The lead single, "À l'ombre" had its radio premiere in October 2012, and the album, Monkey Me entered the French charts at number one in December 2012.

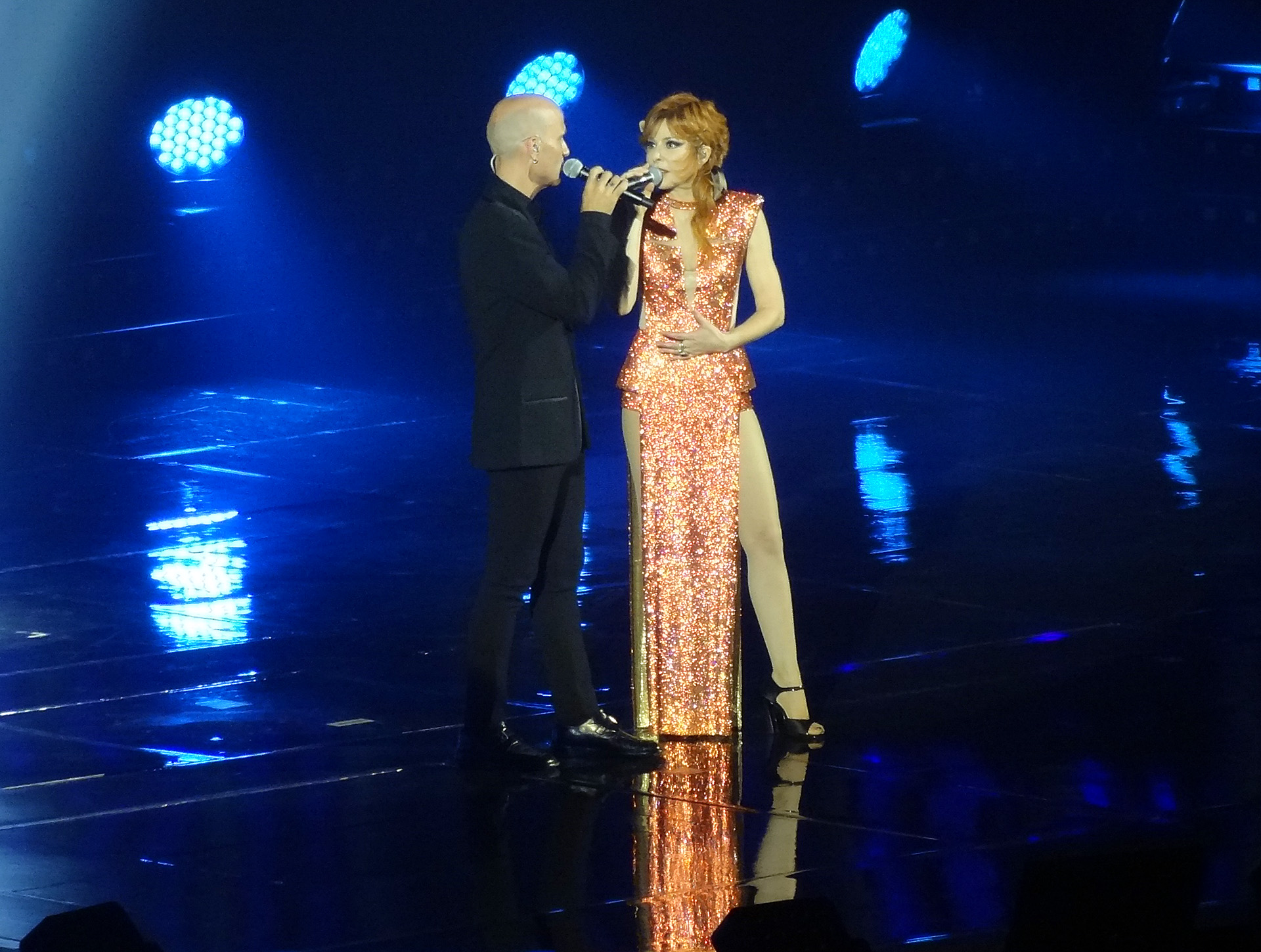
Farmer performing with Gary Jules in 2013

In support of Bleu noir and Monkey Me, Farmer embarked on the Timeless 2013 concert tour, starting in September 2013. More than 500,000 people in total attended the tour, which visited arenas in France, Belgium, Switzerland, Belarus and Russia. The live album of the tour was released in December, with an eponymous film shot in widescreen during the shows in Lyon.

=== 2015–2021: Interstellaires, Désobéissance and Histoires de ===
In 2015, Farmer collaborated with French photographer Sylvie Lancrenon on a coffee table book entitled Fragile. Featuring 90 photos of Farmer taken by Lancrenon, the imagery consists of intimate photographs of the singer covered in talc and clay, focusing on the juxtaposition of fragility and powerfulness.

In August 2015, a new site was launched, announcing new material from Farmer. The first single to be released was "Stolen Car", a duet with Sting, who originally recorded the song for his 2003 album Sacred Love. The single reached number one on the French and Belgian (Wallonia) singles chart and also marks Farmer's debut on top of Billboard's Dance Club Songs chart. Its parent record, Interstellaires, was released on 6 November 2015, becoming Farmer's 12th number one album in France. Farmer collaborated with American producer Martin Kierszenbaum and French DJ The Avener on the album, which also features a cover of "I Want You to Want Me", a song by American rock band Cheap Trick. To promote the album and Stolen Car in the U.S., the singer was interviewed on Late Night with Jimmy Fallon accompanied by Sting, and the two also performed a live rendition of the song.

In 2017, it was announced that Farmer had signed a new record deal with Sony Music Entertainment France. In January 2018, the single "Rolling Stone" was unveiled, making it her first release under her new label. It was followed up by a duet with American singer-songwriter LP, entitled "N'oublie pas". The song was co-written by LP, and the video, set in Iceland, marked the artistic return of Farmer's long-time collaborator, Laurent Boutonnat. Farmer's eleventh studio album, Désobéissance, was released in September 2018. The album was commercially and critically successful, topping the French album chart in its first week, and being described as Farmer's best album in 15 years.

To promote the albums Interstellaires and Désobéissance, Farmer began a nine-date concert residency titled Mylène Farmer 2019 at the Paris La Défense Arena in June 2019. A live album titled Live 2019 was released in October that year.

In 2020, Farmer and Boutonnat started working with upcoming French singer Julia. Her album Passe... comme tu sais was released on 19 June 2020, featuring songs penned by Farmer and produced by Boutonnat.

2020 also saw the premiere of Mylène Farmer – L'Ultime Création, a behind-the-scenes documentary about her 2019 residency concerts. To promote the documentary, and a subsequent greatest hits album entitled Histoires de, the new single "L'âme dans l'eau" was announced, along with a music video consisting of footage from the upcoming documentary. A collection of live and studio recordings between 1984 and 2020, Histoires de debuted at number two on the French charts on 4 December 2020.

In 2021, Mylène Farmer became a member of the jury at Cannes Film Festival.

=== 2022–present: Nevermore tour, L'Emprise, Remix XL ===
The Nevermore 2023 tour was announced in July 2021 with a series of teasers on Farmer's official YouTube channel. It originally consisted of thirteen stadium concerts scheduled in France, Switzerland, and Belgium in June and July 2023. The tour was also planned to go to Russia in August or September 2023 but those plans were dropped in March 2022.

On 13 May 2022, Pascal Nègre, Farmer's manager, announced that she was working on a new studio album along with musicians Woodkid, AaRON, Moby and Archive. The first song from that album, "À tout jamais", was released as a single on 26 August with the music video being released on 12 September. In October, the album's name, "L'Emprise", was revealed via another set of teasers. The album was released on 25 November and reached the top of the album charts in France, Wallonia, and Switzerland. The album was also followed by three other singles: "Rayon Vert" (a duet with AaRon), "Rallumer Les Etoiles" (composed by Moby), and the title track "L'Emprise" (composed by Woodkid). "L'Emprise" is described as a return to the darker instrumentation of her earlier records which incorporates synth-pop, electropop, new wave and baroque pop influences. The instrumentation features predominately violins, synths and drums.

In December 2022, the English rock band Muse released a new version of "Ghosts (How Can I Move On)" featuring Mylène Farmer, reinterpreting the verses originally performed by Italian singer-songwriter Elisa. The song received airtime in Great Britain, France, the United States, and other countries. It briefly topped the French singles chart shortly after its release.

The title track for "L'Emprise" was used as the soundtrack for the closing credits for the French language release of the film "Dungeons and Dragons: Honor Among Thieves". Farmer produced a music video for this song that included extracts from the film. The clip debuted at the French premiere of the film in March 2023.

Farmer contributed to Moby's "Resound NYC" album by reciting the introduction of Arthur Rimbaud's poem "Une saison en enfer" for the instrumental piece "Hyenas". The album was released 12 May 2023.

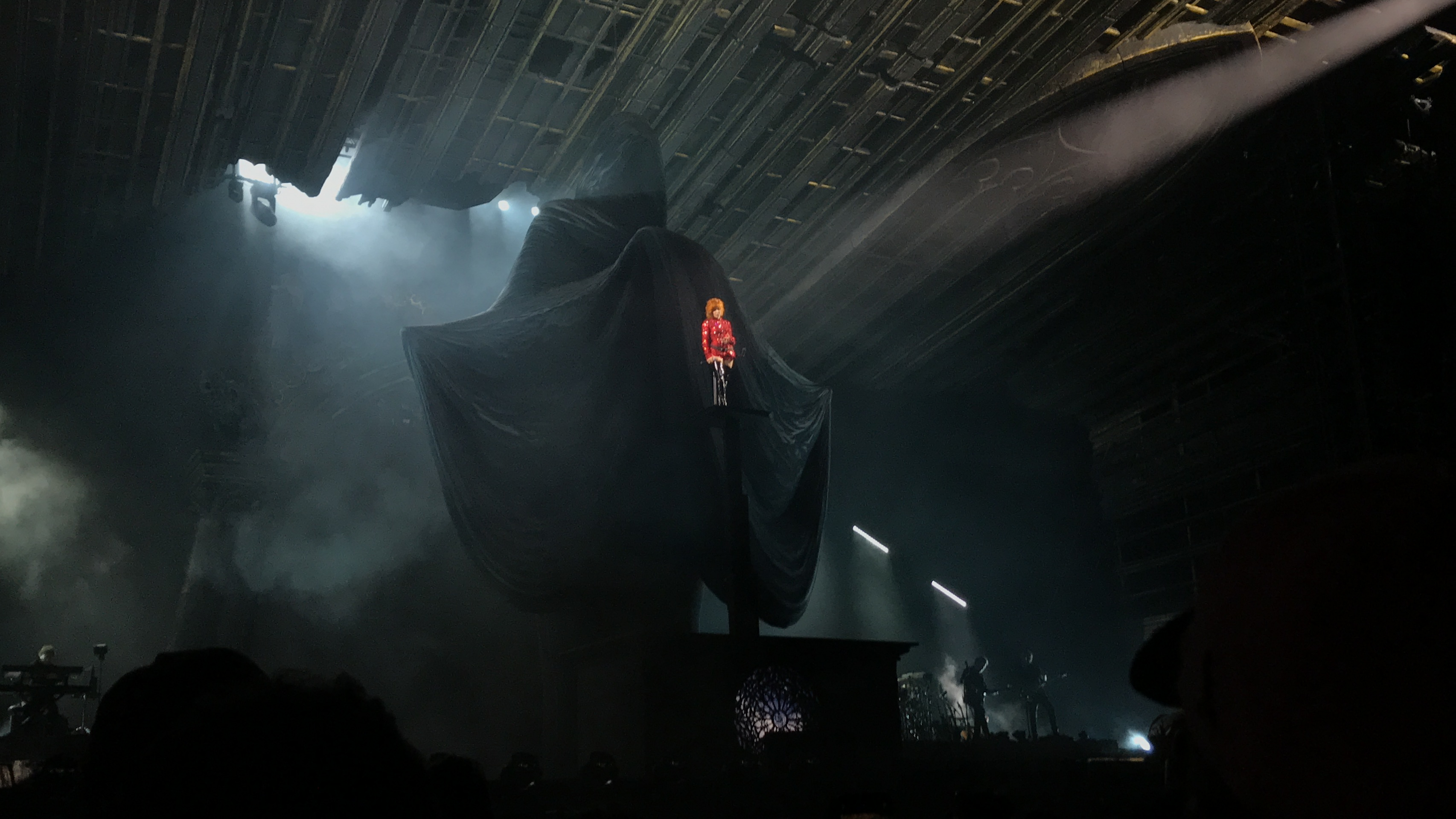
Mylène Farmer performing "Que je devienne..." at the King Baudouin Stadium.

The Nevermore 2023 stadium tour started in Lille on 3 June. The concerts scheduled for the Stade de France on 30 June and 1 July were cancelled hours before the first one was to start due to the Nahel Merzouk riots. The performances were subsequently rescheduled for 27 and 28 September 2024. The lengthy delay was caused by the stadium not being available before then due to the 2024 Summer Olympics games and other events. A third show at the Stade de France on 1 October 2024 was also added to the tour schedule. It is expected that the rescheduled shows will feature the same decor, team members and setlist.

Remix XL was released on 19 April 2024. It contains 20 remixes ranging from the classic songs to recent ones, and features brand new remix version of "Désenchantée" by the DJ Feder, which was released digitally as the first single of the album in February. The singer also re-recorded her vocals for some of the tracks on the album.

On 13 May 2025 Farmer paid a haunting tribute to David Lynch at the Cannes Film Festival, singing the song "Confession", her new song dedicated to the late filmmaker.

== Artistry ==
Farmer's influences include musicians, actors and literary figures. The singer adopted her stage name as an homage to Hollywood actress Frances Farmer, whose character always fascinated her. Other cinematic figures Farmer says she is inspired by include Greta Garbo, Michelle Pfeiffer, Steven Spielberg, and Andrei Tarkovsky. In addition, she has named Depeche Mode, Kate Bush and Jacques Brel as musical influences. In turn, Farmer's work has influenced a number of French recording artists, including Christine and the Queens, Damso and Gims.

=== Lyrical influences ===
Farmer is known for her poetic songwriting, which often features philosophical ideas, symbolism, transgression, religious imagery, alliterations, double entendres and neologisms. Common topics of her lyrics include sex, death, religion and love. Farmer's literary influences include Charles Baudelaire, Edgar Allan Poe, Emily Dickinson, Pierre Reverdy, Stefan Zweig and Søren Kierkegaard.

=== Musical style ===
Musically, Farmer is usually described as a pop and French pop artist; nevertheless, she is known for reinventing her style with every album cycle. All her albums between 1984 and 2008 were produced by her collaborator, Laurent Boutonnat. Her first albums, Cendres de lune, Ainsi soit je... and L'autre... feature dark synth-pop and new wave instrumentation. 1995 saw the release of Anamorphosée, which features more simplistic lyrics and pop rock-influenced music. Innamoramento and Avant que l'ombre... are often described as merging acoustic instruments with electronic beats. Farmer then experimented with electronica and club music on 2008's Point de suture. In 2010, Farmer released her first album without Laurent Boutonnat, Bleu noir, featuring songs produced by RedOne, Moby and British alternative band Archive. The album saw Farmer return to the darker synth-pop and Europop production of her debut album. For 2012's Monkey Me, Farmer collaborated with Boutonnat in the studio one more time. Interstellaires, the singer's tenth studio album shows influences of pop rock and adult contemporary styles, produced by French DJ The Avener and Martin Kierszenbaum. On Désobéissance, Farmer collaborated with French DJ Feder, American singer-songwriter LP and American producer Mike Del Rio, marking a return to electronic dance music. For L'Emprise, Farmer collaborated with Woodkid to produce a "confidant, and very intimate" album which offers a mix of symphonic music, industrial rhythms, and electropop. Moby, AaRON, and Darius Keeler from Archive also contributed to the album.

== Public image ==
Farmer eschews being part of a cult of personality and prefers to be recognized for her work. She rarely grants interviews, has no official fan club, does not endorse any unofficial fan clubs, and has no public facing social media accounts.

In 1988, she was presented the Victoire de la musique award for female performer of the year, but refused to sing at the ceremony due to the behind the scenes infighting that she witnessed while rehearsing for the show. This was her only appearance at this award ceremony. Since then, she has only appeared at ceremonies for which awards are decided by the general public.

In November 1991, Laurent Berger, a disturbed man who had been stalking Farmer, entered the Polydor Records headquarters in Paris and held employees at gunpoint demanding to talk to her. After not being granted the singer's address, the man killed the receptionist with a gunshot. It is said that the incident contributed to Farmer's absence in the media.

Farmer is regarded as a gay icon. Her status has been attributed mainly to her tomboy image early in her career and the lyrics of "Sans contrefaçon", a song about her childhood as a tomboy. She publicly accepted her position as a gay icon in 2008 by saying "We've been following each other for many years, that's important to me. I also think that I share with the gay public, as with other audiences, the feeling of being "different", a feeling that causes difficulty to live in this world."

In January 2015, following the Île-de-France attacks, Farmer declared her support for the Je suis Charlie movement. In March 2020, Farmer's management shared her drawing in support of doctors and nurses working in French hospitals amidst the COVID-19 pandemic, and another unpublished drawing of hers was later auctioned to support the purchase of protective equipment for caregivers.

== Personal life ==
Farmer does not discuss her private life in interviews or on social media. When not on stage, she prefers to stay out of the public eye.

Farmer met American actor, singer and guitarist Jeff Dahlgren on the set of their 1994 movie Giorgino. Following the commercial failure of the film, the couple relocated to Los Angeles. Dahlgren played the guitar on the singer's 1990s albums Anamorphosée and Innamoramento, and accompanied her on stage during her Mylenium Tour. The couple ended their relationship in 1999.

In 2002, Farmer began a relationship with French director and producer Benoît Di Sabatino. The couple met while creating the animated music video for Farmer's single "C'est une belle journée". Di Sabatino also directed the music video for "L'amour n'est rien..." in 2006 and "Appelle mon numéro" in 2008.

== Filmography ==
=== Film ===
Year	Title	Role	Notes
1994	Giorgino	Catherine Degrâce	
2006	Arthur and the Invisibles	Princess Selenia	Voice only, French dub
2009	Arthur and the Revenge of Maltazard	Princess Selenia	Voice only, French dub
2010	Arthur 3: The War of the Two Worlds	Princess Selenia	Voice only, French dub
2018	Ghostland	Pauline	
2024	IF	Blossom	Voice only, French dub
2024	Bambi, l'histoire d'une vie dans les bois	Narrator	Voice only
2025	Dalloway	Dalloway	Voice only

=== Web ===
Year	Title	Role	Notes
2020	Mylène Farmer – L'Ultime Création	Herself	3 episodes

== Discography ==
- Cendres de Lune (1986)
- Ainsi soit je... (1988)
- L'autre... (1991)
- Anamorphosée (1995)
- Innamoramento (1999)
- Avant que l'ombre... (2005)
- Point de suture (2008)
- Bleu noir (2010)
- Monkey Me (2012)
- Interstellaires (2015)
- Désobéissance (2018)
- L'Emprise (2022)
- Égrégore (2026)

== Tours ==
Concert tours

- Mylène Farmer en concert (1989)
- Tour 1996 (1996)
- Mylenium Tour (1999–2000)
- Mylène Farmer en tournée (2009)
- Timeless (2013)
- Nevermore (2023–2024)

Concert residencies

- Avant que l'ombre... à Bercy (2006)
- Mylène Farmer 2019 (2019)

== Awards and nominations ==
Award	Year	Work	Category	Result
NRJ Music Awards	2000	Mylènium Tour	Concert of the Year	Won
NRJ Music Awards	2000	Inamoramento	Francophone Album of the Year	Won
NRJ Music Awards	2000	Herself	Francophone Female Artist of the Year	Won
NRJ Music Awards	2001	Herself	Francophone Female Artist of the Year	Won
NRJ Music Awards	2002	Herself	Francophone Female Artist of the Year	Won
NRJ Music Awards	2002	Herself and Seal	Francophone Group/Duo of the Year	Nominated
NRJ Music Awards	2003	Herself	Francophone Female Artist of the Year	Won
NRJ Music Awards	2006	Avant que l'ombre...	Francophone Album of the Year	Won
NRJ Music Awards	2006	Herself	Francophone Female Artist of the Year	Nominated
NRJ Music Awards	2007	Herself and Moby	Francophone Group/Duo of the Year	Nominated
NRJ Music Awards	2009	Herself	Francophone Female Artist of the Year	Nominated
NRJ Music Awards	2009	Point de suture	Francophone Album of the Year	Won
NRJ Music Awards	2011	Herself	Francophone Female Artist of the Year	Nominated
NRJ Music Awards	2012	Herself	Diamond Award for Lifetime Achievement	Won
Victoires de la Musique	1986	"Libertine"	Music Video of the Year	Nominated
Victoires de la Musique	1987	"Tristana"	Music Video of the Year	Nominated
Victoires de la Musique	1988	Herself	Female Artist of the Year	Won
Victoires de la Musique	1988	"Sans contrefaçon"	Music Video of the Year	Nominated
Victoires de la Musique	1989	"Pourvu qu'elles soient douces"	Music Video of the Year	Nominated
Victoires de la Musique	1991	Herself	Female Artist of the Year	Nominated
Victoires de la Musique	1991	"Désenchantée"	Music Video of the Year	Nominated
Victoires de la Musique	1991	L'Autre...	Best Arrangements	Nominated
Victoires de la Musique	1996	Anamorphosée	Most Exported French Language Album	Won
Victoires de la Musique	1996	Tour 96	Concert of the Year	Nominated
Victoires de la Musique	1999	Herself	Female Artist of the Year	Nominated
Victoires de la Musique	1999	Mylènium Tour	Concert of the Year	Nominated
Victoires de la Musique	2000	Herself	Female Artist of the Year	Nominated
Victoires de la Musique	2000	Mylènium Tour	Concert of the Year	Nominated
Victoires de la Musique	2005	Herself	Female Artist of the Last 20 Years	Won
World Music Awards	1993	Herself	World's Best-Selling French Artist	Won

== Bibliography ==
- Lisa-Loup et le Conteur (2003) – Mylène Farmer – Anne Carrière Ed. – ISBN 2-84337-221-6 – A tale written and illustrated by Mylène Farmer
- Avant que l'ombre à Bercy – Paris 2006 (2006) – Mylène Farmer – Anne Carrière Ed. – ISBN 2-84337-433-2
- Fragile (2015) – Mylène Farmer – Anne Carrière Ed. – ISBN 2-84337-784-6 – Photos by Sylvie Lancrenon

== See also ==
- List of artists who reached number one on the French Singles Chart
