= Désobéissance =

Studio album by Mylène Farmer
- Released: 28 September 2018
- Recorded: 2017–18
- Genre: Pop; electro
- Length: 43:22
- Label: Sony
- Producer: Feder; Mike Del Rio; Kimotion

Mylène Farmer chronology
Interstellaires (2015)	Désobéissance (2018)	Live 2019 (2019)

Singles from Désobéissance
- 1. "Rolling Stone" Released: 18 January 2018; 2. "N'oublie pas" Released: 21 June 2018; 3. "Sentimentale" Released: 20 September 2018; 4. "Désobéissance" Released: 11 October 2018; 5. "Des larmes" Released: 20 March 2019

Désobéissance (meaning Disobedience) is the eleventh studio album by French singer Mylène Farmer, released by Sony Music Entertainment on 28 September 2018. On 30 November 2018, the album was re-released with a bonus DVD. Désobéissance topped the chart in France and Belgium Wallonia, and reached number 3 in Switzerland and number 19 in Belgium Flanders.

The album received generally positive reviews from critics, who noted its modern electro sound and collaborations with young artists, and found that Farmer still retained her signature style, though some believed it was less accessible than her previous work.

== Commercial reception ==
Désobéissance debuted at number one in France, selling 90,379 units (84,142 in physical sales, 4,144 in downloads and 2,092 in streaming). It became the album with the third-largest opening sales week of 2018, after Mon pays c'est l'amour by Johnny Hallyday, which has sold 780,177 copies (758,056 in physical sales, 14,332 in downloads and 7,789 in streaming), and Enfoirés 2018: Musique! by Les Enfoirés (129,391 units). On the album's release day, Désobéissance was certified Gold by SNEP. In the second week, Désobéissance has sold 21,240 units (20,222 in sales and 1,018 in streaming), and fell to number four on the Top Albums Chart (Sales + Streaming) and number two on the Top Albums Chart (Sales). On 5 October 2018, the album was certified Platinum in France for sales of 100,000 units. In the third week, Désobéissance has sold 13,700 units (12,640 in sales and 1,060 in streaming), and stayed number four on the Top Albums Chart (Sales + Streaming) and fell to number three on the Top Albums Chart (Sales). In the fourth week, the album has sold 11,820 units, and fell to number seven on the Top Albums Chart (Sales + Streaming) and number five on the Top Albums Chart (Sales). On 14 December 2018, Désobéissance was certified 2× Platinum by SNEP. In 2018, it has sold 213,000 copies in France.

== Track listing ==
All lyrics are written by Mylène Farmer except where noted; all music is composed by Feder except where noted.

Désobéissance - Standard edition
No.	Title	Lyrics	Music	Producer(s)	Length
1.	"Rolling Stone"		Feder; Johanna Iser; Peter Hoppe; Anastassia Zimmerman; Ashley Hicklin; Kimberley Sawford; Quentin Segaud	Feder	3:45
2.	"Sentimentale"		Feder; Segaud	Feder	4:16
3.	"Désobéissance"		Leon Deutschmann	Kimotion	3:59
4.	"N'oublie pas" (with LP)		LP; Mike Del Rio; Nate Campany	Del Rio	3:39
5.	"Histoires de fesses"			Feder	1:57
6.	"Get Up Girl"		Feder; Segaud; Tommy Jean	Feder	3:37
7.	"Prière"		Feder; Segaud	Feder	3:34
8.	"Au lecteur"	Charles Baudelaire		Feder	3:15
9.	"Des larmes"		LP; Del Rio	Del Rio	3:48
10.	"Parler d'avenir"		Deutschmann	Feder	3:31
11.	"On a besoin d'y croire"		Feder; Zimmerman	Feder	3:48
12.	"Retenir l'eau"		Deutschmann	Feder	4:13

Désobéissance - Deluxe edition CD bonus songs
No.	Title	Writer(s)	Producer(s)	Length
13.	"Untitled"	Feder; Segaud	Feder	3:43
14.	"Histoires de fesses" (Extended version)		Feder	3:04

Désobéissance - Deluxe edition DVD
No.	Title	Length
1.	"Rolling Stone" (Music video)	3:43
2.	"N'oublie pas" (Music video)	3:51
3.	"Sentimentale" (Music video)	4:19
4.	"Désobéissance" (Music video)	4:23
5.	"Désobéissance" (Making Of)	3:59

== Charts ==
=== Weekly charts ===
Chart (2018)	Peak position
Belgian Albums (Ultratop Flanders)	19
Belgian Albums (Ultratop Wallonia)	1
French Albums (SNEP)	1
Swiss Albums (Schweizer Hitparade)	3
Swiss Albums (Schweizer Hitparade Romandy)	1

=== Year-end charts ===
Chart (2018)	Position
Belgian Albums (Ultratop Wallonia)	8
French Albums (SNEP)	10
Swiss Albums (Schweizer Hitparade)	55

Chart (2019)	Position
Belgian Albums (Ultratop Wallonia)	114
French Albums (SNEP)	107

== Certifications ==
Region	Certification	Certified units/sales
France (SNEP)	2× Platinum	250,000
