= AaRON =

French musical duo

- Origin: France
- Genres: Electronic rock, indie pop, alternative rock
- Years active: 2005–present
- Members: Simon Buret; Olivier Coursier
- Website: aaronofficial.com

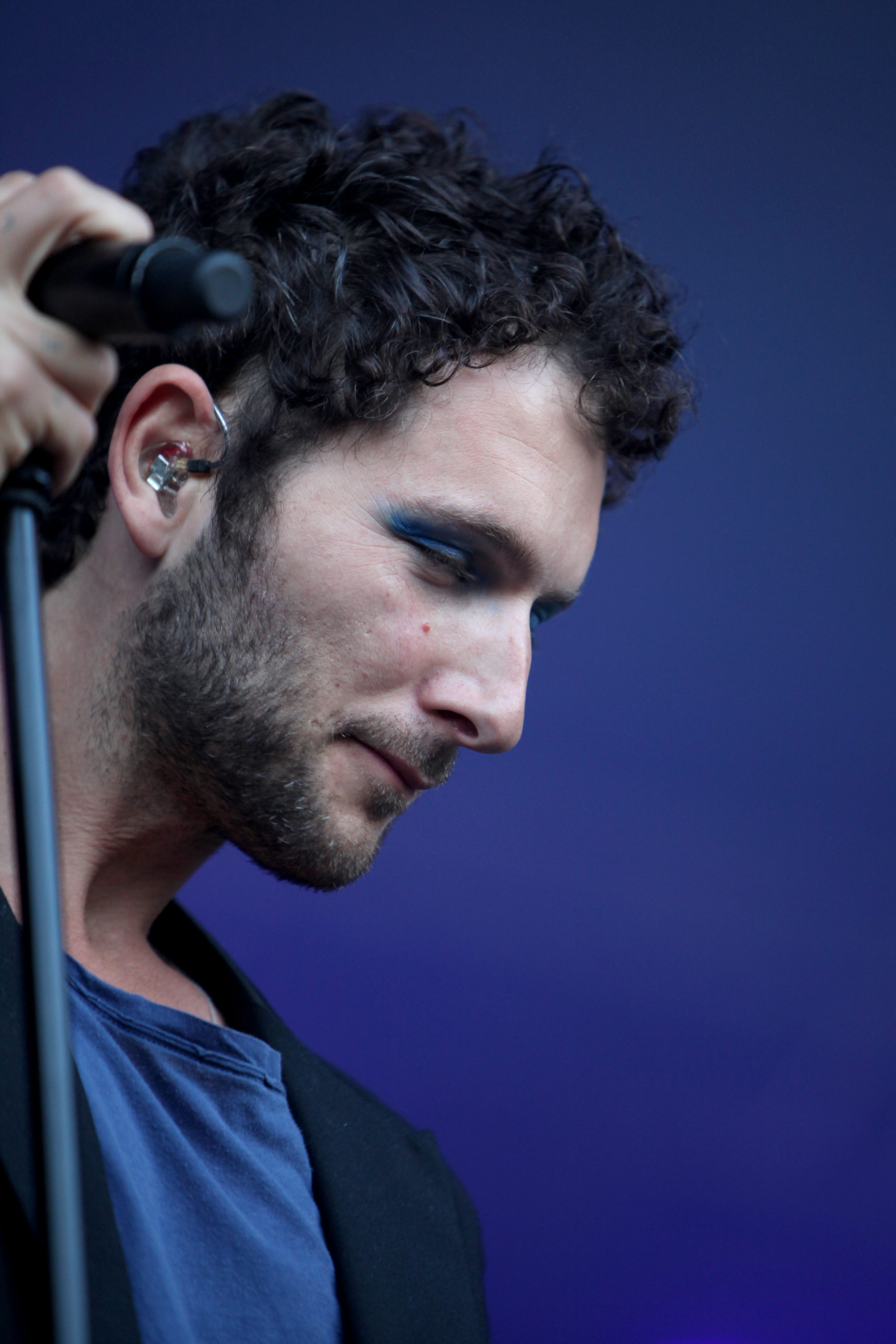
Simon Buret

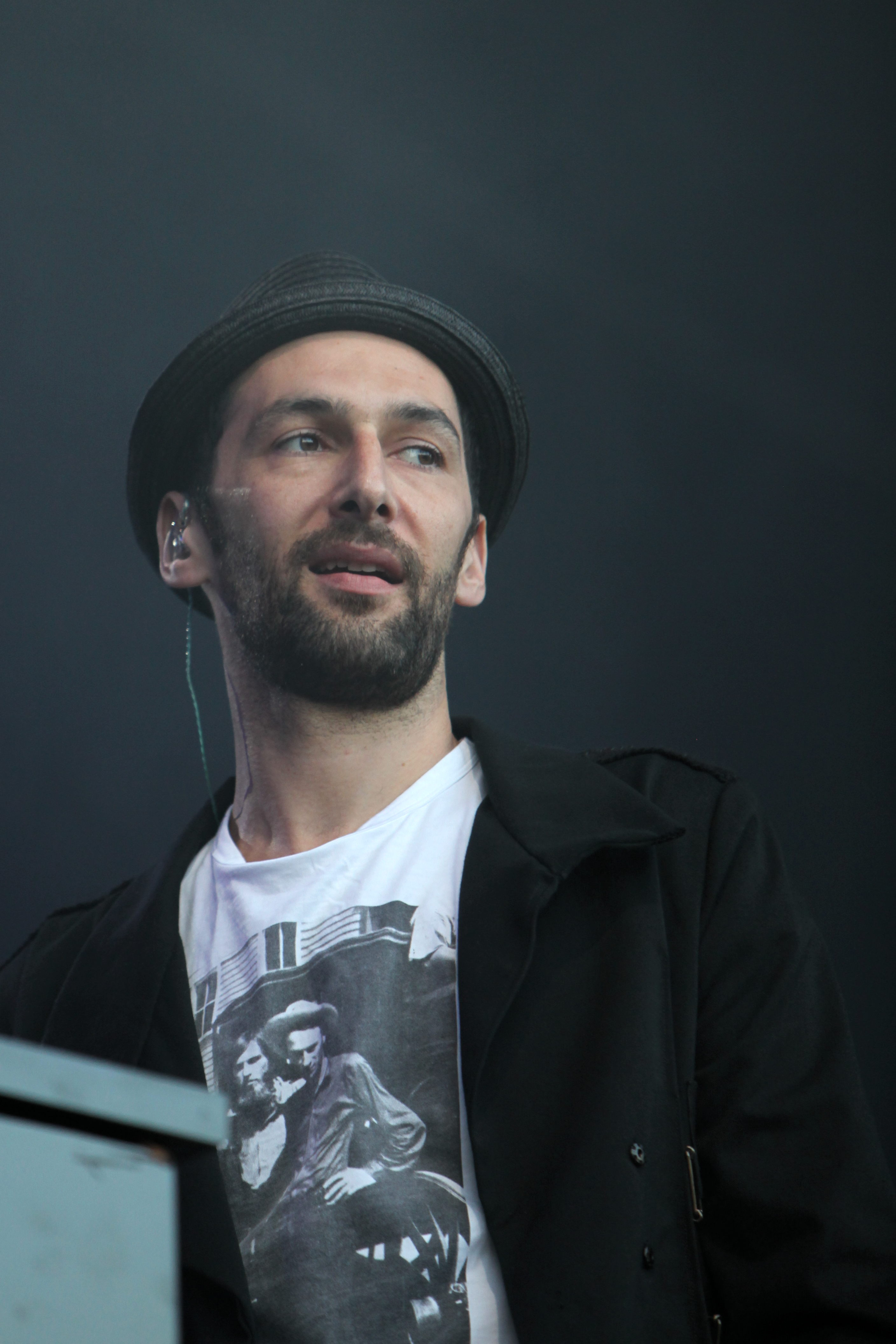
Olivier Coursier

AaRON (Artificial Animals Riding on Neverland) is a French pop rock musical duo, consisting of Simon Buret and Olivier Coursier. Their debut album Artificial Animals Riding on Neverland was released in 2007 and made them popular in France and Europe. Their first tour of Europe was carried out in 2007 between March 14 and November 28, including dates in Spain, Switzerland, Belgium, Austria, Luxembourg. The second album, Birds in the Storm, was released in May 2010.

== Members ==
- Simon Buret : singer, author and composer
- Olivier Coursier : composer and arranger

== Discography ==
=== Studio albums ===
Year	Album	Charts				Certification
Year	Album	FR	FR (DL)	BEL (Wa)	SWI	Certification
2007	Artificial Animals Riding on Neverland	8	1	4	50	2× Gold
2010	Birds in the Storm	6	1	1	35	2× Gold
2015	We Cut the Night	8		6	15	
2020	Anatomy of Light					

=== Singles ===
Year	Single	Charts				Album
Year	Single	FR	FR (DL)	BEL (Wa)	SWI	Album
2007	"U-Turn (Lili)"	17	6	21	50	Artificial Animals Riding on Neverland
2007	"Endless Song"	–		12 (Ultratip)	–	Artificial Animals Riding on Neverland
2007	"Le tunnel d'or"	31		15 (Ultratip)	–	Artificial Animals Riding on Neverland
2008	"Angel Dust"	–		–	–	Artificial Animals Riding on Neverland
2008	"Little Love"	–		–	–	Artificial Animals Riding on Neverland
2008	"Mister K"	–		–	–	Artificial Animals Riding on Neverland
2010	"La place du vide" (Zazie with AaRON)	–		31	–	From Zazie album Za7ie
2010	"Rise"	–		44	–	Birds in the Storm
2010	"Seeds of Gold"	–		21	–	Birds in the Storm
2011	"Arm Your Eyes"	–		22 (Ultratip)	–	Birds in the Storm
2011	"Tomorrow Morning"	–		–	–	
2013	"U-Turn (Lili)" (re-release)	21		–	–	Artificial Animals Riding on Neverland
2015	"Shades of Blue"	–		–	–	We Cut the Night
2015	"Blouson noir"	63		10 (Ultratip)	–	We Cut the Night
2015	"Onassis"	147		–	–	We Cut the Night

Covers

- On the first AaRON album, they covered the song "Strange Fruit", a song which was made famous by Billie Holiday. The version they perform on the album is drawn largely from Nina Simone's rendition on her 1965 album Pastel Blues.

=== Live albums ===
- 2011: Waves from the Road (recorded live from the Unplugged & Waves tour)

=== Soundtracks ===
- 2006: Je vais bien, ne t'en fais pas (soundtrack of film) in 2 tracks:
  - "U-Turn (Lili)" – the song was integrated into the film as a song written by a character for his sister; the character of the sister was then renamed to "Lili" to match the song.
  - "Mister K."
- 2013: Les yeux fermés (soundtrack of film directed by Jessica Palud)
