= Stéphane Neville =

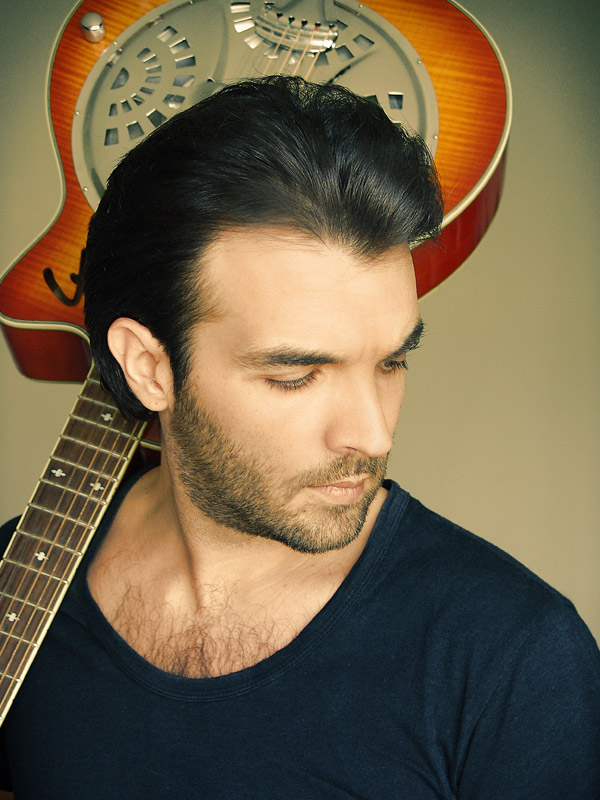
- Stéphane Neville

Background information
- Born: 20 October 1973 (age 52); Marseille, France
- Origin: France
- Genres: Folk, rock
- Years active: 2000–present
- Website: stephaneneville.com

Stéphane Neville (born 20 October 1973 in Marseille, France) is a French singer, composer, actor and, director.

== Biography ==
Stéphane Neville studies music and acting at the Marseilles conservatory. He plays in festivals and has opened for concerts by Norma Ray, Sylvie Joly, Hélène Segara.

Neville has played in many musicals in France and in Asia : Le Petit Prince by Richard Cocciante, Les enfants du soleil by Didier Barbelivien, Don Juan by Félix Gray, Roméo et Juliette by Gérard Presgurvic, Pinocchio by Marie-Jo Zarb. He also acts in movies and writes soundtracks for plays and films.

== Musicals ==
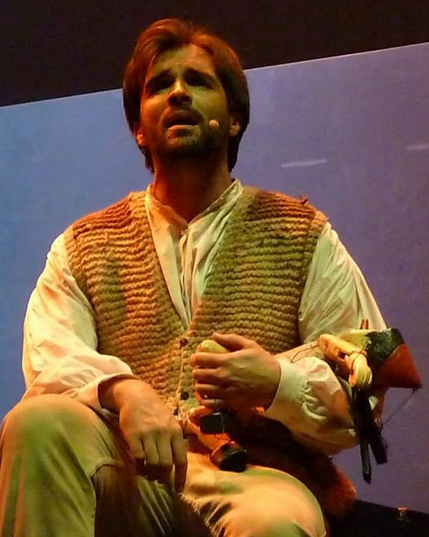
Stéphane Neville in Pinocchio (2013)

- 2002-2003 : Le Petit Prince by Richard Cocciante and Elisabeth Anaïs, dir Jean-Louis Martinoty - Casino de Paris : the king
- 2004 : Les Enfants du Soleil by Didier Barbelivien and Cyril Assous - Marseille, Lyon : David Atlan
- 2005-2006 : Don Juan by Félix Gray, dir Gilles Maheu - Palais des congrès de Paris, Seoul : Raphaël and Don Juan
- 2007-2008 : Le Petit Prince by Richard Cocciante and Elisabeth Anaïs, dir Jean-Louis Martinoty - Hong Kong, Shanghai
- 2009-2011 : Cendrillon, le spectacle musical by Gérald Sybleyras and Etienne de Balasy, dir Agnès Bourry - Théâtre Mogador : the prince
- 2011 : 80 jours : Un pari est un pari by Marie-Jo Zarb and Moria Némo - Zénith d'Orléans : Phileas Fogg
- 2012-2013 : Roméo et Juliette by Gérard Presgurvic, dir Redha - Japan, China : Benvolio
- 2013 : Pinocchio by Marie-Jo Zarb and Moria Némo, dir Marie-Jo Zarb - Théâtre de Paris, tour : Gepetto

== Filmography ==
=== Actor ===
- 2001 : Le Nouveau Jean-Claude by Didier Tronchet
- 2002 : Les Marins perdus by Claire Devers
- 2005 : Le monde est petit by Florence Thibaudat, short
- 2010 : La liberté de Casanova by R. Vernerey, short

=== Musician ===
- 2008 : Mitfahrgelegenheit by Alexander Shulz, song A bon entendeur
- 2010 : La liberté de Casanova by R. Vernerey, short
- 2012 : Love collection by Antoine Lhonoré-Piquet, song I don't know

=== Director ===
- 2012 : Tant de temps, documentary about Henri Salvador
- 2014 : Pas le droit à l'erreur by Jonah, clip
- 2014 : Wish by The Bab's, clip
- 2014 : Above you by The Bab's, clip
- 2014 : Entendez-vous by Cécile Corbel, clip
- 2015 : The Unrecalled, short
- 2016 : Soy by Sebastien El Chato, clip
- 2016 : La fille sans nom by Cécile Corbel and Faada Freddy

== Theatre ==
- 2015 : L'héritage était-il sous la jupe de Papa ?, cowritten by Laurence Briata and Nicolas Ronceux, dir by Cécile Fertout and Nicolas Ronceux, Paris

== Collaborations (sound, graphics) ==
- 2012-2013 : Accalmies passagères by Xavier Daugreilh
- 2013-2014 : Laurette de Paname by, dir and with Laure Bontaz - France, South Korea, South America

== Discography ==
=== Albums ===
- 2002 : Le Petit Prince
- 2004 : Les enfants du soleil
- 2009 : Cendrillon

=== Singles ===
- 2009 : La vie de château from Cendrillon
- 2012 : I don't know
- 2013 : Un faux départ with the collectif Les grandes voix des comédies musicales

=== Collaborations ===
- 2016 : Heyhey by Gwladys Fraioli

== DVD ==
- 2002 : Le Petit Prince
- 2004 : Les enfants du soleil
- 2009 : Cendrillon
