= Je te survivrai =

1989 single by Jean-Pierre François

Single by Jean-Pierre François

from the album Des Nuits
- B-side: "Je l'ai revue hier soir"
- Released: June 1989
- Recorded: 1989
- Studio: Studio CBE
- Genre: Pop, chanson
- Length: 4:22
- Label: Zone Music
- Songwriter: Didier Barbelivien
- Producers: Didier Barbelivien, Bernard Estardy

Jean-Pierre François singles chronology
"Je te survivrai" (1989)	"Il a neigé sur les lacs" (1990)

"Je te survivrai" (transl. French for "I Will Survive You") is a 1989 pop song recorded by French singer and former footballer Jean-Pierre François. Written by Didier Barbelivien, it was released first in June 1989 as the first single from his only album Des Nuits (1990), on which it is the ninth and last track. It was a summer hit in France, reaching number two on the singles chart, and has become a popular song throughout years.

== Background ==
François, who had just experienced a romantic separation, went to the Côte d'Azur where he met famous lyricist Didier Barbelivien in a nightclub; it was said that Barbelivien, impressed by François' athletic physique, would have said to his friend Félix Gray: "You see this guy? I'm going to write him a hit". He thus proposed François to write him a song that would deal with his recent split. The recording of "Je te survivrai" was difficult because François had a slight lisp and a thinner voice than expected, so that Barbelivien first wanted to give up; however, sound engineer Bernard Estardy had the idea to record François with a broken voice, then mixed the song for weeks. At the time, a persistent rumor stated that the song used Barbelivien's voice, later modified in the studio. The success of the single allowed François to record an album, Des Nuits, which was released in 1990 and provided another top ten hit, "Il a neigé sur les lacs".

== Music video ==
The music video for "Je te survivrai" was directed by Simon Lelouch and shows François riding on the beaches of Camargue. It was parodied by Les Nuls.

== Chart performance ==
In France, "Je te survivrai" debuted at number 41 on the chart edition of 24 June 1989, entered the top ten five weeks later, and peaked at number two for non consecutive four weeks, being blocked from the number one slot by Kaoma's massive international hit "Lambada". It fell off the top 50 after 23 weeks of presence, 13 of them in the top ten. On the European Hot 100 Singles, it debuted at number 69 on 22 July 1989 and reached a peak of number 12 in its seventh and ninth weeks, and left the chart after 19 weeks.

== Track listings ==
- 7" single
1. "Je te survivrai" — 4:22
2. "Je l'ai revue hier soir" — 3:33
- 12" maxi
1. "Je te survivrai" (remix) — 5:54
2. "Je l'ai revue hier soir" — 3:33
- 7" single - Canada
1. "Je te survivrai" — 4:22
2. "Je l'ai revue hier soir" — 3:33

== Charts ==
=== Weekly charts ===
Chart (1989)	Peak position
Europe (European Hot 100)	12
France (SNEP)	2
Québec (Francophone chart)	39

=== Year-end charts ===
Chart (1989)	Position
Europe (European Hot 100)	52

== Release history ==
Country	Date	Format	Label
France	1989	7" single	Zone Music
France	1989	12" maxi	Zone Music
Canada	1989	7" single	Charles Talar
