= Mylène Farmer en concert =

1989 concert tour by Mylène Farmer

- Tour by Mylène Farmer
- Promotional poster for the tour
- Location: Europe
- Associated album: Ainsi soit je...
- Start date: 11 May 1989
- End date: 8 December 1989
- No. of shows: 45

Mylène Farmer concert chronology
- Mylène Farmer en concert (1989); 1996 Tour (1996)

Mylène Farmer en concert was Mylène Farmer's 1989 concert tour in support of her second studio album, Ainsi soit je.... It was the first tour of the singer.

== Introduction ==
In 1989, five years had passed since the first hit of Farmer ("Maman a tort" in 1984), and other successful songs had crowned the singer's career. However, she always sang in play-back when she was invited on television (she only performed live - with difficulty - "Tristana" on La Nouvelle Affiche, on 1 April 1987). As a result, some people believed that Farmer was not a real singer. Thus, to prove her talent to her critics, Farmer scheduled a series of concerts for May 1989 in Saint-Étienne and at the Palais des Sports (Paris) for a total of nine shows. According to Sophie Tellier, one of the dancers, Farmer thought at the beginning that she would never be able to go on stage, and then she saw this tour as an "incredible challenge". Farmer admitted that she knew before her tour that she would be the subject of criticisms, and is why she got ready physically and artistically with a great perfectionism. She chose the Palais des Sports, because she explained that she "hated the intimate places" that "prevented her from finding pleasure" and that she needed big spaces. In October, she revealed that she will perform 16 songs on stage.

Every effort was made by Farmer and Boutonnat so that this concert would be huge, whether it is at the level of the stage set, the music, special effects, choreographies... As these concerts were "a real triumph" (all available tickets were sold), a tour was scheduled adding 44 shows mainly across France, but also Switzerland and Belgium. Because of the smallness of some concert halls and the enormous size of the stage set, several shows were forced to be cancelled. Other shows were postponed (for example, the concerts in Valence and Sanary were postponed on 16 October for technical reasons). All the concert halls were full every evening. Farmer was also the first French female singer to sing in the great hall of the Palais omnisports de Paris-Bercy.

Before going on stage, Farmer had an intensive athletic training including running (5 km per day), physical and breathing exercises, and was on a diet (she had even stopped smoking). She also took singing lessons. In an interview, she said about the concert : "I really eagerly awaited the moment to try this experiment. Today, I want to go there. I feel I'm able to do it. A second round is beginning. (...) I don't want an intimate concert hall. I need wide open spaces, a breath." She confessed that she was anxious at the idea of singing on stage and that she didn't manage to sleep because of that. However, she considered this show as "an immense pleasure".

Thierry Rogen, who has been involved in the elaboration of the show, said in an interview that this concert was "one of [the] most beautiful professional experiences, but at the same time one of [the] worst". According to him, preparations for the concert were very difficult, because Farmer and Boutonnat had a high level of professionalism and they wanted to produce a great spectacle. He explained: "We [Farmer's team] were scared until the end to not be up to the task. (...) We were the first to put synths and movies on stage, with a technology that was not so sophisticated as it is today (...). Mylène's discs were so sophisticated in the production that we could not go on stage and just put a drummer, a bass player and a guitarist. It needed that the audience find again on stage the color of albums which contained multiple sequences and programming. Therefore, in addition to the vocalists and Mylène on stage, there were also some backings, which included footage of voices. Perhaps it is this that has led criticism, because some people said that the sound was too great to emerge only from the stage." He confirmed then that Farmer had never sung in playback during this tour.

The basis idea of the stage set was "the passage of time". Boutonnat and Farmer wanted to create "a little gothic atmosphere, mixing mysterious, deep and old things", connected to the psychoanalysis. All should be "both thoughtless and strong". Finally, a cemetery was chosen by the singer to frame her show and "her arrival on the stage resembled that of a ghost coming out of a tomb". Indeed, the atmosphere of these concerts was rather sad and cold. White and black were the dominant colors of the show. The transport and the assembly of the stage necessitated enormous technical means. Spectators were not allowed to photograph the singer or the stage, because an agency was specially in charge of this work.

After the first shows, Farmer said that through these concerts, she was able for the first time in her life to have confidence in herself.

== Critical reception ==
=== Negative comments ===
The lack of talent

Reviewing a concert in Lausanne, Swiss newspaper Le Matin ran a review with the headline "A dish for nothing", criticising the music as an "indescribable sonic cacophony" and the choreography as "a nullity equalled only by stupidity". Similarly, Le Parisien argued that the show relied on "clichés from across the Atlantic", describing it as "well done, without a soul [...] icy, but colossal" and criticised Farmer's performance, referring to her "poor swaying hips", "thin voice" and "neurotic look". The review concluded that the show brought "neither pleasure nor happiness", calling it a "swindle".

The lack of emotion and a sad ambiance

Other reviews criticised the show for its lack of emotion and spontaneity. Writing for Télé Moustique, Rudy Leonet concluded that, in spite of "formidable professionalism", the production failed to evoke the emotional intensity "one might expect from an artist known for her extreme sensitivity and vulnerability". Likewise, an article published in L'Humanité considered the concert as "impeccable", but argued that the lack of spontaneity suggested that the singer "does not truly care for the audience". Dernières Nouvelles d'Alsace described the concert as "prefabricated", although some concertgoers disagreed with this assessment. La Nouvelle République du Centre described the concert in Poitiers as being "satanic, grand, perverse, (...) sulphurous, fascinating, on the verge of the uneasiness".

The lack of dialogue with the audience

According to a press article, what "has failed the most to this performance is generosity". Indeed, except a 'good evening' and a 'thank you', Farmer didn't speak to her audience and according to this article it is possible to "wonder where the love comes from the public for a too cold" singer. In the same way, while Le Dauphiné libéré admitted that the show was "perfect", it criticized the "contact with the audience [which] was disappointing".

The too loud sound system

Many critics blamed the show for its too loud music. For example, an article underlined "the profusion of special effects, a grandiloquent stage setting", but also "a high-powered and often rough sound system", concluding : "Everything for the eye, nothing for the ears". Another article declared that Farmer had taken care of the visual aspect of her show, with original choreographies, but that what she had sung was not very audible. L'Echo du Centre recognized that "choreographies were remarkable and perfectly adjusted", but expressed a regret about the sound system. La Dépêche du Midi asserted that, "in spite of a so little acoustic and too synthetic music", Farmer "pulled through with the honors". La Libre Belgique considered that the "intrusive" sound system which "prevents from understanding texts", is perhaps "the main criticism" against this show, adding that Farmer "has a voice, some charm and the talent", but that the concert "misses improvisation and dialogue". In the same way, Le Provençal said :"The sound saturated by instruments leaves only a tiny space to the small vocal cords" of Farmer. Figaroscope said that "Farmer disappointed by her repeated absences [on stage] and a sound system (...) grinding her fragile organ". As for Le Courrier picard, it described as "errors of course" the "blaring sound system" and the "blinding lights" and predicted that Farmer would not perform other tours after that one.

=== Positive reviews ===
The talent of Farmer

Conversely, certain media praised the talent of the singer. About one of the first shows at the Palais des Sports, France Soir said: "Her show, rhythmic and very calibrated in the fantasized register that she likes, is that of a real professional", with a "fine gesture". Var Matin stated : Farmer's work "almost reaches the perfection" and "combines grace to quality". About the performance in Lausanne, a Swiss newspaper said that the show was "beautiful" and Farmer made a "real professional work". Le Dauphiné said that Farmer "has the necessary scale to compete with the sense of the show which the Americans have". Lyon Figaro considered that the show in Lyon "splendidly demonstrated the supremacy of the singer on the French market". According to L'Est Républicain, after her concerts of May in Paris, Farmer proved that "she was intended for the stage" and that her performances are able to "silence her last critics". After the performance in Fréjus, Var Matin said that, in a "mystic atmosphere", Farmer "gave all the measure of her talent".

The greatness of the show

Podium described this show as "a memorable concert", with its "naughty choreography", "exquisite staging" and "luxurious costumes". The article stated : "Mylène Farmer on stage, it is a real videoclip in three dimensions, the fury and emotion at the power ten (...), a festival of strong images". According to a Swiss newspaper, "the audience was not disappointed. (...) No place is conceded to improvisation, the songs are refined in the extreme". France Soir declared that the concert in Saint-Étienne was "fascinating" and "magical". Sud Ouest stated that the show is "well conceived", "every song is highlighted by an original stage setting and choreography", with "beautiful costumes and perfect lighting effects". It also qualified the show as a "big spectacle", in which "the choreography looks like ballets". According to L'Alsace and L'Express, "the show kept its promises" and was a "total triumph". La Montagne stated : "The surprise came from the real visual show, magnificently settled. (...) The work on the lightings and the stage setting is the sign of the very great class". Le Méridional qualified this concert as "bewitching".

== Commercial success ==
For only the concerts at Paris-Bercy (two shows), 35,000 tickets were sold in a very short time (five weeks). 40,000 people attended her single concert in Brussels, 4,000 in Grenoble, 5,000 in Fréjus, 14,000 in Lyon, 7,500 in Lausanne, 2,500 in Rennes, 6,000 in Lievin, 6,000 in Nantes, 3,500 in Mulhouse, 2,500 in Strasbourg. According to Farmer, approximately 7,000 people attended each of her shows.

This tour was one of the more imposing in France at that time: indeed, it cost over 40 million francs and more than 300,000 people were at this tour. For this tour, there were eight dancers, seven musicians, three singers, 50 technicians, five trucks and 38 tons of equipment.

Through her successful concerts at Bercy, Farmer "demonstrated that she had become one of the largest [stars]".

== Set list ==
No	Song	Costume	Choreography	Comment
1	"Ouverture"			This instrumental song which lasts six minutes was composed by Laurent Boutonnat. It includes screams of children and animals. It concludes with the rising of the curtain by a monk wearing a hooded raincoat who opens the gates of the cemetery.
2	"L'Horloge"	Black veils, transparent black cloak, and black gloves.	No	The song begins with the sound of the hand of clock. Farmer's silhouette appears in a flash of light between two tombs in the center and at the back of the stage. The singer comes down a long staircase with her arms outstretched, like a vampire. She is dressed like a boy. After singing, she returns to the back of the stage into a rhythmic walk and goes away by another staircase behind the stage, and enters again a grave. The stage is then hidden by the spotlights facing upwards.
3	"Plus grandir"	Same costume, without the cloak and gloves. White collar, small white socks.	Rhythmical choreography performed with two female dancers.	Farmer reappears on stage with two dancers behind her who reproduce the same gestures. At the end of the song, the singer said "good evening" to the audience.
4	"Sans logique"	Same costume	Collective choreography inspired by the 18th century, composed of large gestures and these movements become smaller as if Farmer was bound by twine.	When the music begins, Farmer curtseys several times, and the phrase "This is a blank formatted diskette" is repeated throughout the performance. About the middle of the song, the singer hits the ground with her microphone and gets up again immediately. At the end, the dancers disperse.
5	"Maman a tort"	White pyjamas, socks	No complex choreography. Farmer and Carole Fredericks make a few steps.	Vocalist Carole Fredericks plays the role of a nurse. In a lengthy monologue, she complains about one of her female patients, who is difficult to live with. Farmer, hitherto hidden beneath the full dress of Frederick, suddenly appears. She wears a pyjamas and performed the song by waddled like a little child. The song is very similar to the original one, but at the end the two women sing a long rap passage in which they seem to quarrel. Fredericks, playing the role of the mother, says : "Je suis ta mère (x3), alors tu es ma fille", and Farmer replays to her : "Je ne suis pas ta fille (x3), et tu n'es pas ma mère". Then Farmer disappears, while Fredericks gets back to her place while laughing.
6	"Déshabillez-moi"	Black latex dress with sleeves fastened along the body that greatly limit arm movements.	No	From the first notes, spotlights are changing colors. Farmer sings with a microphone on a base, and sometimes she pretends to laugh. Her bondage dress rendered Farmer unable to undress herself, which explains why she wore it for the song of which title would be translated to English as "Undress Me". After a final "Déshabillez-vous !" and an explosion of fireworks, a total black enables Farmer to leave the stage to take off her dress. This performance is one of the funniest moments of the concert.
7	"Puisque"	Tight-fitting black dress with pieces hanging on each arm. One of Farmer's hands gloved.	No choreography, just a few steps along the stage.	This sad song was preferred to "Dernier Sourire" at the time. In the musical introduction that lasts more than three minutes, beating thunder mingle with the song's melody. The light is subdued and spotlights track the movement of the arm of the singer. The song is performed with great emotion. At the end, there is a total black and Farmer leaves the stage to change her clothes.
8	"Pourvu qu'elles soient douces"	Red spandex pantyhose, heel boots, transparent gray veil.	Very dynamic collective choreography, with suggestive movements	The song begins with a set of lights. Farmer, back on the podium, moves her hips and plays with her microphone. The dancers come on stage by the stairs and form a circle. While the musical bridge continues, Farmer joined the dancers who remove the bottom of her dress; two of them lift the singer. There are a few moments of play-back during the remixed musical bridge. At the end of the song, the dancers leave the front of the stage, and Farmer presents the musicians. The guitarists and the cellist play a long musical bridge with very rock sonorities to let time to prepare the stage for the next song.
9	"Allan"	Black and white checked trousers, grey jacket.	No choreography, only a few steps.	The song has an introduction of 1:30 performed by Carole Fredericks.
10	"À quoi je sers..."	Same costume	No choreography, just a few steps.	The song is similar to the studio version, but the introduction was slightly modified with a few guitar riffs. After the performance, Farmer left the stage by a staircase. "À quoi je sers..." was not performed at Palais des Sports (Paris), in May (the song was not created at the time).
11	"Sans contrefaçon"	* Farmer: same costume. She turns her jacket and wears a cap with the same patterns. *Dancers: same costume.	First, Farmer performs a choreography moving her hips, and then she is joined by all dancers.	Dancers come in holding hands and start a choreography during which they mime a street brawl. Farmer asks the audience to sing the refrain with her.
12	"Jardin de Vienne"	Farmer removes the jacket and the cap and wears a gray shawl.	No	The song, performed in a version similar to the album one, is one of the sad and moving moments of the show.
13	"Tristana"	* Farmer: red coat-dress, red boots and leather gloves * Female dancers: Russian farmers * Male dancers: Soviet soldiers	The choreography is based on the video : first performed by all the dancers, and then only by Farmer and two soldiers.	In the introduction, wind noise and cries wolf can be heard and there is some white smoke. Farmer leaves the stage hugged by two dancers.
14	"Ainsi soit je..."	Black patterned dress	No	The song has a musical introduction which lasts two minutes, played on the guitar and strings. Farmer begins crying from the second refrain.
15	"Libertine"	Costume of the 18th century, similar to that of the video : black trousers, white shirts, red boots and long red gloves.	Collective choreography	Farmer and Sophie Tellier (the rival in the video) are back to back, and the winner shot of the singer marks the beginning of the song. Then the dancers hold candlesticks and fans. After the song, Farmer presents the musicians while many fireworks illuminate the stage, then leaves it by a staircase. This song is the longest one of the concert.
16	"Mouvements de lune (part I)"	Same costume	No	It is a musical interlude plus a chorus of monks. Meanwhile, Farmer is changing costume.
17	"Je voudrais tant que tu comprennes"	Black dress and black gloves	No	This song is a moving cover originally recorded in 1966 by Marie Laforêt.
18	"Mouvements de lune (part II)"	Same costume	No	Farmer is leaving the stage, she does a goodbye with the hand, while the gates of the cemetery close.

== Tour dates ==
There were a total of 52 shows, from 11 May to 8 December 1989, in three countries (France, Belgium, Switzerland):

Date	City	Country	Venue	Refs
11 May 1989	Saint-Étienne	France	Palais des Sports	
18 May 1989	Paris	France	Palais des Sports	
19 May 1989	Paris	France	Palais des Sports	
20 May 1989	Paris	France	Palais des Sports	
21 May 1989	Paris	France	Palais des Sports	
22 May 1989	Paris	France	Palais des Sports	
23 May 1989	Paris	France	Palais des Sports	
24 May 1989	Paris	France	Palais des Sports	
25 May 1989	Paris	France	Palais des Sports	
19 September 1989	Grenoble	France	Summum	
21 September 1989	Valence	France	~~Mammouth, Granges-lès-Valence~~ Cancelled	
22 September 1989	Dijon	France	~~Palais des Sports~~ Cancelled	
23 September 1989	Fréjus	France	Arènes Romaines	
24 September 1989	Avignon	France	Parc des Expositions	
26 September 1989	Sanary-sur-Mer	France	~~Esplanade de la mer~~ Cancelled	
29 September 1989	Montpellier	France	Le Zénith	
30 September 1989	Toulouse	France	Palais des Sports	
1 October 1989	Toulouse	France	Palais des Sports	
6 October 1989	Limoges	France	Palais des Sports et des Fêtes	
7 October 1989	Montluçon	France	Athanor	
8 October 1989	Le Mans	France	La Rotonde	
10 October 1989	Lyon	France	Halle Tony Garnier	
11 October 1989	Clermont Ferrand	France	Maison des Sports	
13 October 1989	Lausanne	Switzerland	Palais de Beaulieu	
14 October 1989	Annecy	France	Place des Romains	
16 October 1989	Sanary	France	~~Esplanade de la mer~~ Cancelled	
18 October 1989	Rennes	France	Salle omnisports	
20 October 1989	Brussels	Belgium	Forest National	
21 October 1989	Brussels	Belgium	Forest National	
24 October 1989	Bordeaux	France	Patinoire Meriadeck	
25 October 1989	Angers	France	Parc des Expositions	
27 October 1989	Poitiers	France	Arènes	
28 October 1989	Pau	France	Foire-Expo	
4 November 1989	Valence	France	Mammouth, Granges-lès-Valence; Originally scheduled on 21 September	
6 November 1989	Valence	France	Mammouth, Granges-lès-Valence	
8 November 1989	Chartres	France	~~Chartrexpo~~ Cancelled	
10 November 1989	Lorient	France	Parc des Expositions, Lann-Sévelin	
11 November 1989	Tours	France	Parc-Expo, Rochepinard	
14 November 1989	Perpignan	France	~~Palais des Expositions~~ Cancelled	
15 November 1989	Sanary-sur-Mer	France	Esplanade de la mer	
16 November 1989	Marseille	France	Palais des Sports	
17 November 1989	Bourg-en-Bresse	France		
20 November 1989	Caen	France	Parc des Expositions	
21 November 1989	Reims	France	Parc des Expositions	
22 November 1989	Besançon	France	Palais des Sports	
24 November 1989	Lons-le-Saunier	France		
25 November 1989	Metz	France	Parc des Expositions	
26 November 1989	Lieven	France	Lieven	
28 November 1989	Montbéliard	France	~~Parc des Loisirs de Voujeaucourt~~ Cancelled	
29 November 1989	Épinal	France	~~Parc des Expositions~~ Cancelled	
1 December 1989	Rouen	France	Parc des Expositions	
2 December 1989	Nantes	France	La Beaujoire	
3 December 1989	Amiens	France	Centre d'Expositions et de Congrès	
5 December 1989	Mulhouse	France	Palais des Sports	
6 December 1989	Strasbourg	France	Rhénus	
7 December 1989	Paris	France	Palais omnisports de Paris-Bercy	
8 December 1989	Paris	France	Palais omnisports de Paris-Bercy	
