= Henri Virlogeux =

French actor

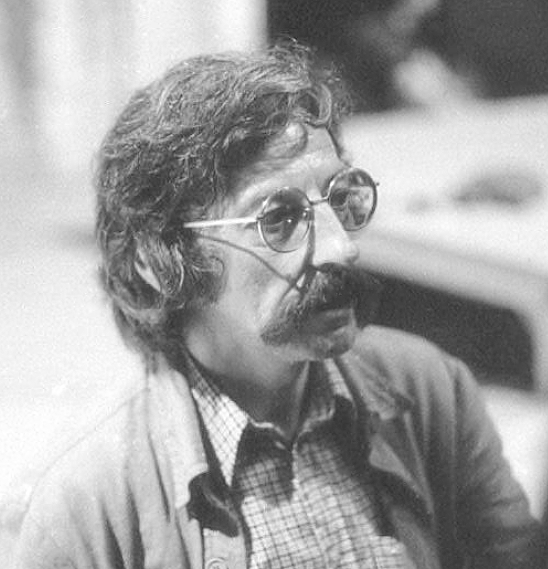

Henri Virlogeux (22 March 1924 – 19 December 1995) was a French actor. He is known for "The 400 Blows" (1959), "Les rois maudits" (1972) and "Schulmeister, espion de l'empereur" (1971). He was married to Véronique Silver. He died on 19 December 1995 in Paris, France.

== Selected filmography ==
- The Seventh Commandment (1957) – Le garçon d'étage de province
- Let's Be Daring, Madame (1957) – Le cantonnier
- Not Delivered (1958) – Le portier de l'hôtel (uncredited)
- It's All Adam's Fault (1958)
- Seventh Heaven (1958) – Le garçon de café
- School for Coquettes (1958) – Un employé du Racinet
- Madame et son auto (1958) – Lapointe
- The 400 Blows (1959) – Night watchman
- Le secret du Chevalier d'Éon (1959) – Le roi de Prusse (uncredited)
- Lovers on a Tightrope (1960) – Le garçon d'étage
- Au coeur de la ville (1960)
- The Fenouillard Family (1960) – Le commandant
- Arrêtez les tambours (1961) – Drummer
- A Man Named Rocca (1961) – Ficelle
- Horace 62 (1962) – Le commissaire (uncredited)
- Les sept péchés capitaux (1962) – Antonin (segment "Gourmandise, La") (uncredited)
- Arsène Lupin Versus Arsène Lupin (1962) – L'inspecteur Ganimard
- It's Not My Business (1962) – Pierjan
- Vice and Virtue (1963) – L'intellectuel joueur d'échecs, président du tribunal
- Any Number Can Win (1963) – Mario
- The Day and the Hour (1963) – Legendre – le pharmacien résistant
- Carom Shots (1963) – Brossard
- Le Magot de Josefa (1963) – Charquin
- Le Bon Roi Dagobert (1963) – L'instituteur
- Panic in Bangkok (1964) – Leasock
- Patate (1964) – Le professeur Bichard
- The Gorillas (1964) – Le second gardien à la Santé
- Henri-Georges Clouzot's Inferno (1964) – Dr. Arnoux
- The Sucker (1965) – Un complice de Saroyan
- Diamonds Are Brittle (1965) – Picard
- L'Or du duc (1965)
- How to Keep the Red Lamp Burning (1965) – Le médecin (segment "Fermeture, La")
- The Mona Lisa Has Been Stolen (1966) – Le conservateur du Louvres
- The Saint Lies in Wait (1966) – Oscar Chartier
- Le Dimanche de la vie (1967) – M. Balustre
- Le Fou du labo 4 (1967) – Savant
- Darling Caroline (1968) – Le docteur Guillotin
- A Strange Kind of Colonel (1968) – Le savant / Trilby Beach
- The Tattoo (1968) – Dubois, le percepteur
- The Madwoman of Chaillot (1969) – The Peddler
- Poussez pas grand-père dans les cactus (1969) – Doctor Binz
- Les femmes (1969) – La voix du maire (voice, uncredited)
- Les Patates (1969) – Parizel père
- Tintin and the Temple of the Sun (1969) – Un des 7 savants (voice)
- Aladdin and His Magic Lamp (1970) – Le magicien d'Afrique (voice)
- Trop jolies pour être honnêtes (1972) – Gaëtan, le père de Bernadette
- Tintin and the Lake of Sharks (1972) – Le professeur Tournesol (voice)
- Les Rois maudits (1972) – Jacques Duèze/Pope John XXII (miniseries)
- The Twelve Tasks of Asterix (1976) – Panoramix / Iris (voice)
- L'Année sainte (1976) – Commissaire Barbier
- Le mille-pattes fait des claquettes (1977) – Le deuxième gardien du Louvre
- Death of a Corrupt Man (1977) – Paul
- L'Exercice du pouvoir (1978) – Victor Brisquet
- La Ballade des Dalton (1978) – Tom O'Connor, le chercheur d'or (voice)
- The Associate (1979) – Urioste
- Alors heureux? (1980) – Le père de Pierre
- Cherchez l'erreur (1980) – Le directeur
- Signé Furax (1981) – Le passant égaré
- Les années lumière (1981) – Lawyer
- Flics de choc (1983) – Barraud, le chauffeur de taxi
- La Tentation d'Isabelle (1985) – Le père d'Isabelle
- La Gitane (1986) – Le vieux Gitan
