= Ainsi soit je... (song) =

Single by Mylène Farmer

from the album Ainsi soit je...
- B-side: Remixes; "Et Tournoie" (live) (1997 release)
- Released: 4 April 1988
- Recorded: 1988
- Genre: Synthpop, baroque pop
- Length: 4:30 (single version); 6:19 (album version); 4:39 (live single version)
- Label: Polydor
- Songwriters: Lyrics: Mylène Farmer; Music: Laurent Boutonnat
- Producer: Laurent Boutonnat

Mylène Farmer singles chronology
"Sans contrefaçon" (1987)	"Ainsi soit je..." (1988)	"Pourvu qu'elles soient douces" (1988)
"La Poupée qui fait non" (1997)	"Ainsi soit je... (live)" (1997)	"L'Âme-stram-gram" (1999)

Alternative cover
- CD single of the live version, release in 1997, nine years after the original release

"Ainsi soit je..." (English: "So Be I...") is a 1988 song recorded by the French artist Mylène Farmer. The song was released as a single twice: as the second single from her second studio album Ainsi soit je... on 4 April 1988, and as the second single in a live version from her second live album Live à Bercy on 20 August 1997. Both versions achieved a relative success on the charts, failing twice to reach the top ten in France.

== Background and writing ==
After the huge success of "Sans contrefaçon", Boutonnat and Farmer decided to release as a new single the title track "Ainsi soit je...", just one month before the album release. It was the first ballad of the singer. The cover of the single, which was created by Farmer's friend, Elsa Trillat, is almost identical to the album's one, but without the puppet which featured in the video "Sans contrefaçon". The single was released under the traditional formats (vinyls) but also CD maxi and, for the first time, a CD video. The single was also released in Japan, but about two years after the Francophone countries.

== Lyrics and music ==
As for all her songs since "Tristana", Farmer wrote the lyrics. However, the first words of the couplets "bulle de chagrin, boule d'incertitude" were written in the 1970s by Marie, a singer who had died not long before and unknown to the general public. In this way, Farmer paid tribute to her. According to manager Bertrand Le Page, the song was also inspired by a song entitled "Avant que le monde explose, je veux mourir", which passed unnoticed and which contained in its chorus the words "Ainsi soit-il, ainsi soit-elle".

The song's title refers to the formula which ends Christian prayers ('Amen' i. e. 'Ainsi soit-il' or 'So be it' in English), but here it is spelled 'Ainsi soit je...', instead of 'Ainsi sois-je', showing that the 'Je' (or 'I' in English) is personified. French journalist Benoît Cachin stated that in this song, Farmer "reveals her loneliness, her pain of living and her great lucidity", and deals with the theme of existentialism, which was also present in "À quoi je sers...". This suggests that "the singer's single religion is despair, sadness and great lucidity on the future". She speaks to someone to warn him against her own solitude. The same semantic field is used as in "Regrets": cold, winter, time. According to author Erwan Chuberre, the notes are high, giving thus a "nagging nostalgia" to the song, and the music is like a nocturne by Frédéric Chopin. As in "Rêver" and "Redonne-moi", some lyrics are sung in the high notes to express sadness.

== Music video ==
This 5:23 video was directed by Laurent Boutonnat who also wrote the screenplay. This Requiem Publishing production was shot for two days in studios of Stains, France, and cost only about 30,000 euros, as some of the money was being saved for the next video, "Pourvu qu'elles soient douces". It is a tribute to Walt Disney's animated feature, Bambi. The video was the singer's favourite at the time, and was her sole one in sepia tone. It was broadcast for the first time in the television show Top 50 on Canal+ a few weeks after the single release. The scene of the drowning, shot in the same pond and with almost the same team as that for "Plus grandir", was very difficult to film because the singer was then afraid of the water. Farmer said in an interview that the sobriety of the clip was well suited to this song.

The video is singular amongst Farmer's videos of the time, as it does not have a particular storyline: At the beginning of the video, the snow falls on a black background. An owl appears on a tree while the full moon illuminates the scene. Farmer rides a swing, whilst a deer observes. A drop of water falls into a puddle reflecting the moon. Then dressed in a long black coat, the singer walks in the snow. Lying on the floor next to the deer, she gets up and looks at the animal. When the refrain begins, Farmer, nude and in profile view, falls back several times. Then she goes down again next to the deer and gets up with her face covered with mud. She is then in the water in which she performs a gruesome dance (this dance was also performed in "Pardonne-moi") and eventually drowns. At the end of the video, the owl flies and the snow starts again to fall.

The music video for "Ainsi soit-je..." was deemed as a tribute to the animated feature Bambi.

The video could evoke the life cycle. According to journalist Caroline Bee, the "melancholy tone is accentuated by the cold colours". The "owl could refer to a double meaning: the first is the idea of wisdom and a guiding presence in the black ([i. e.] the melancholy of ideas sung by the artist), but [the second is the idea of] an animal that opens eyes to the harshness of life and the temporary nature of things". Magazine Top 50 gave a positive review of the video, saying it "is both simple and technically impeccable. Lights, movie camera movements, framing, everything works towards setting up on the screen the atmosphere of sadness and melancholy expressed through song."

The video for the 1997 single release was composed of images from the 1996 tour.

== Critical reception ==
According to Compact, "Ainsi soit je..." is a sweet ballad, but that may tire the listener because of it is being too repetitive. However, it stated that the song is really a "hit" thanks to its music video which is composed of "sublime images" and made with "extreme delicacy". It also said that the song had found its musical influences from France Gall, Jane Birkin and Françoise Hardy's musical works and considered it as a "success".

In France, the single in its original version was listed on the SNEP chart for fourteen weeks, from 30 April to 30 July 1988. As there was no music video in the first weeks, television show Top 50, which presented the singles chart every Saturday, broadcast Farmer's performance on Sacrée Soirée to illustrate the song. The single debuted at number 31 and reached a peak at number twelve in its sixth week. On the European Hot 100 Singles, it started at number 87 on 14 May 1988, reached number 43 five weeks later, and fell off the chart after 12 weeks of presence.

The live version released in 1997 did not have the same success and remained in low positions: in France, it peaked at number 27 in its second week on 30 August, and was ranked for only five weeks; in Belgium, the song entered at number 22, its highest position, on 6 September and dropped the next three weeks. The single was little aired on radios as they preferred to air the live version of more rhythmic songs, including "Désenchantée" on NRJ and "Que mon cœur lâche" on Europe 2.

== Live performances ==
In 1988, Farmer performed the song in ten televisions shows: Les Uns les autres (TF1, 22 April), Jacky show (TF1, 24 April), Fête comme chez vous (Antenne 2, 5 May), La Une est à vous (TF1, 7 May), Sacrée Soirée (TF1, 18 May), Top 50 (Canal+, 26 June), Mon Zénith à moi (Canal +, 18 June), À la folie pas du tout (TF1, 19 June), Les Dicos d'or sous le soleil du Québec (FR3, 21 August), Lahaye d'honneur (TF1, 24 August). In most of her performances, Farmer wore a large white wedding dress. In the show Sacrée Soirée, she sang "Ainsi soit je..." surrounded by stuffed animals and she cried in the heat of emotion. In 1997, she also performed the song to promote the live version, on Les Enfants de la lune (TF1, 6 June). On this occasion, she wore a dress made of feathers - the same as for the video "Souviens-toi du jour" -, and performed the song in an almost acoustic live version with a music of piano. On 24 April 2010, she performed "Ainsi soit-je..." on the French television show Encore une chanson, broadcast on France 2, with Yvan Cassar on piano; however as she lipsynched a recording of the song, her performance was criticized, even by the singer's fans.

The song was performed at four of her five tours. During the Mylène Farmer en concert (1989), Farmer wore a black patterned dress and began crying from the second refrain. On the Live à Bercy (1996), Farmer wore a clear trousers and a bra, and was accompanied by pianist Yvan Cassar. During the 2006 series of concerts, Farmer sung "Ainsi soit je..." only at the first four evenings, as she had difficulty by singing in the high notes, and the song was replaced by "L'Autre" which was finally chosen to be included on the CD and DVD of the concert. During the Mylène Farmer en tournée (2009), Farmer wore a blue dress and was again accompanied by pianist Yvan Cassar.

== Cover versions ==
In 2003, the song was covered by Michal Kwiatkowski, a contestant of the French show Star Academy 3, and his version was included on the album Les Meilleurs Moments du Prime. French singer Marie Laforêt had planned to cover the song at her concerts at the Bouffes Parisiens in 2005, as tribute to Farmer who had performed Laforêt's song "Je voudrais tant que tu comprennes" during the 1989 tour), but eventually cancelled this project.

== Formats and track listings ==
These are the formats and track listings of single releases of "Ainsi soit je..." and "Ainsi soit je... (live)":

=== Studio version ===
7" single - France

No.	Title	Length
1.	"Ainsi soit je..."	4:30
2.	"Ainsi soit je..." (lamentations)	4:45

7" maxi - France

No.	Title	Length
1.	"Ainsi soit je..." (maxi remix)	7:10
2.	"Ainsi soit je..." (classic bonus beat)	6:22

CD maxi - France

No.	Title	Length
1.	"Ainsi soit je..." (maxi remix)	7:10
2.	"Ainsi soit je..." (lamentations)	4:45
3.	"Ainsi soit je..." (classic bonus beat)	6:22

CD maxi - Video - France

No.	Title	Length
1.	"Ainsi soit je..." (maxi remix)	7:10
2.	"Ainsi soit je..." (lamentations)	4:45
3.	"Ainsi soit je..." (classic bonus beat)	6:22
4.	"Ainsi soit je..." (video)	5:30

7" single - Promo - France

No.	Title	Length
1.	"Ainsi soit je..."	4:30
2.	"Ainsi soit je..."	4:30

CD maxi - Long box - Japan

No.	Title	Length
1.	"Ainsi soit je..." (maxi remix)	7:10
2.	"Ainsi soit je..." (lamentations)	4:45

Digital download

No.	Title	Length
1.	"Ainsi soit je..." (Ainsi soit je... version)	6:18
2.	"Ainsi soit je..." (Le Mots version)	4:45
3.	"Ainsi soit je..." (1989 live version)	7:42
4.	"Ainsi soit je..." (1996 live version)	5:00
5.	"Ainsi soit je..." (maxi remix)	7:10
6.	"Ainsi soit je..." (2009 live version)	4:18

=== Live version ===
CD single - France

No.	Title	Length
1.	"Ainsi soit je..." (live version)	4:39
2.	"Et tournoie" (live version)	4:30

CD single - Promo - Digipack - France

No.	Title	Length
1.	"Ainsi soit je..." (live version)	4:39

VHS - Promo - France

No.	Title	Length
1.	"Ainsi soit je..." (video)	5:04

== Credits and personnel ==
These are the credits and the personnel as they appear on the back of the single:

- Mylène Farmer – lyrics
- Laurent Boutonnat – music, production

1988 release

- Thierry Rogen – mixing
- Bertrand Le Page / Polygram Music – editions)
- Elsa Trillat – photo
- Jean-Paul Théodule – design cover

1997 release

- Polygram Music / BMG Music Publishing France – editions
- Claude Gassian – photo
- Com'N.B – design cover

== Release history ==
Date	Label	Region	Format	Catalog
4 April 1988	Polydor	France, Belgium, Switzerland	7" single	887 448-7
4 April 1988	Polydor	France, Belgium, Switzerland	7" maxi	887 448-1
4 April 1988	Polydor	France, Belgium, Switzerland	CD maxi	887 448-2
4 April 1988	Polydor	France, Belgium, Switzerland	CD video	080 360-2
June 1990	Polydor	Japan	CD maxi	PODP-1010
20 August 1997	Polydor	France, Belgium, Switzerland	CD single	571 436-2
20 August 1997	Polydor	France, Belgium, Switzerland	CD single - Promo	3620

== Official versions ==
Version	Length	Album	Remixed by	Year	Comment
Single version	4:30	—	—	1988	See the previous sections
Album version	6:18	Ainsi soit je...	Laurent Boutonnat	1988	The song was shorter than the single version, with more musical bridges and refrains.
Maxi remix	7:10	Dance Remixes	Thierry Rogen	1988	This version is so slow and melancholy as the original one, with more music and refrains. There are also more percussion that punctuated the title throughout the song. Farmer sings "soit je" several times at the beginning of this remix.
Classic bonus beat	6:22	—	Thierry Rogen	1988	This version brings to the fore the Farmer's voice at the expense of strings, especially the cello.
Lamentations	4:45	—	Thierry Rogen	1988	This version is an instrumental remix; all the words are removed, but Farmer performs vocals during the refrains. At the beginning of the song, we can hear a crying wolf.
Music video	5:23	Les Clips Vol. II, Music Videos I	—	1988	
Live version (recorded in 1989)	7:49	En Concert	—	1989	This very moving version has a long musical introduction composed of strings and guitars which lasts about two minutes. Farmer cries from the second chorus. See Mylène Farmer en concert
Live version (recorded in 1996)	4:40	Live à Bercy	—	1996	See 1996 Bercy
Live music video	5:04	Music Videos II & III	—	1996	
Album version	4:45	Les Mots	Laurent Boutonnat	2001	This is a remasterised version.
Live version (recorded in 2006)	5:00	—	—	2006	See Avant que l'ombre... à Bercy (tour)
Live version (recorded in 2009)	4:18	N°5 on Tour	—	2009	In this version, the last chorus has been omitted. (see Mylène Farmer en tournée)

== Charts and sales ==
=== Weekly charts ===
Chart (1988)	Peak position
Europe (European Airplay Top 50)	44
Europe (European Hot 100)	43
France (SNEP)	12

Chart (1997)	Peak position
Belgium (Ultratop 50 Wallonia)	22
Europe (European Hot 100 Singles)	90
France (SNEP)	27

=== Sales ===
Sales for "Ainsi soit je..."
Region	Certification	Certified units/sales
France (album version)	—	150,000
France (live version)	—	70,000
