= Hirokazu Ikuta =

Japanese director

- 生田大和
- Pronunciation: いくた ひろかず
- Born: 1981 (age 44–45); Tokyo, Tokyo Prefecture, Japan
- Occupation: Director
- Years active: 2003 –
- Known for: Takarazuka Revue director

Hirokazu Ikuta (生田大和, born 1981) is a Japanese director and script writer primarily working for all-female theatre troupe Takarazuka Revue.

== Career ==
In 2003 he joined the revue after graduating from university. Under the guidance of the director Shuichiro Koike, he worked as an assistant director from 2007 to 2014, and a newcomer performance (新人公演) director from 2006 to 2017.

In 2010 directed his first solo project "The Bund / Neon Shanghai" for Flower Troupe's Manato Asaka and Remi Shirahana. In 2014, made his Takarazuka Grand Theater debut with "The Last Tycoon" for new Flower Troupe's leading actresses (top combi) Tomu Ranju and Hana Ranno.

In 2018 he worked with composer Frank Wildhorn for Snow Troupe's "Revolutionary Maximilien Robespierre", for new leading actresses (top combi) Fuuto Nozomi and Kiho Maaya. In 2019, worked with producer Dove Attia for Flower Troupe's "Casanova".

== Biography ==
He was born in Tokyo and raised in Kanagawa prefecture. The first Takarazuka production that he saw was the Moon Troupe's "Ale's Afterglow / TAKARAZUKA Ole!" (1994).

In 2023 he married a former leading actress (top musumeyaku) Kiho Maaya. Their relationship started after the 2021 production of Don Juan, where she played a lead role.

== Works ==
=== Takarazuka projects ===
- 2024, Don Juan (Flower)
- 2022, Years of pilgrimage (Flower)
- 2021, Sherlock Holmes (Cosmos)
- 2019, Casanova (Flower)
- 2017–18, Revolutionary Maximilien Robespierre (Snow)
- 2016, Don Juan (Snow)
- 2014, The Love of the Last Tycoon (Flower)
- 2012, Spring Snow (Moon)

=== Outside projects ===
- 2024, Death Takes a Holiday
- 2021, Don Juan
- 2019, Don Juan
