= Patti Layne =

- Birth name: Patti Dawn Fedrau
- Born: January 31, 1956 (age 69)
- Origin: Saskatoon, Saskatchewan, Canada
- Genres: Pop, folk
- Occupation(s): Singer, songwriter, dj, recording artist, musician, actress, tv presenter, counsellor/addiction therapist
- Instrument(s): Vocals, guitar, clarinet
- Years active: 1981–present
- Labels: Campagne, Pathé Marconi (EMI France), Carrere, Phonogram/PolyGram
- Website: www.pattilayne.com

Patti Layne (born Patti Dawn Fedrau; January 31, 1956) is a Canadian singer/songwriter/recording artist. Patti Layne had a recording career in France from 1982–1991 and started recording again in 2009. Her first release in 1982, 'Une espèce de Canadienne' (Pathé/Campagne/Pathé-Marconi) written by Didier Barbelivien for her, was a moderate success. It was followed by an album (with songs written by Didier Barbelivien, Claude Lemesle and Pierre Delanoë, and others). Several singles followed over the next few years.

In France she also presented TV programs in the end of the 1980s, then moved to England in the beginning of the 1990s. She continued singing off and on, and continued to write songs with many different people including Carrie Lennard, Dzal Martin, Claus Regli, Ian Whitmore, Tom Hardwell, and others, but did not record again until 2009, when she made the album, 'Prairie Burn' (released in 2010).

== Biography ==
Patti Layne was born in Saskatoon, Saskatchewan to Lois (née Dewar) and Abe Fedrau (died in 2004). Lois was school teacher at the time and Abe was the co-owner of a hardware store. She has three sisters and one brother. Music was always encouraged at home and Patti started singing and playing the clarinet from a young age. She belonged to local choirs and the school unit band until leaving high school. She worked at various odd jobs and moved around a lot until she was 21 when she became a disc jockey in a restaurant in Vancouver.

While she was there, a woman who owned a couple of fashion outlets asked her to model for her and she began modelling. A Parisian modelling agency (Karin Models) scout chose her to come to Paris when she was 23. She arrived in Paris and was sent to Italy (Model Plan) and stayed in Italy for 2 years.

She began singing at parties in Italy and someone suggested she pursue a career in singing, so she moved back to Paris and after some introductions to the right people, she was offered a record contract. Patti began working with manager/producer Bernard Ricci on her first album in 1981 and was introduced to Didier Barbelivien who wrote 'Une espèce de Canadienne' for her. It was released in 1982. During the radio promotion for this single, she met Cécil Maury (born Thierry Giner, singer/songwriter and producer) on a radio promotion tour. They had a relationship which lasted for 6–7 years and had one child, Bogart Giner in 1986.

Patti worked with Bernard Ricci for 4–5 years, releasing four singles and one album. She went on tour as the opening act for Caroline Loeb in 1986 and later that year gave birth to Bogart. She changed management in the beginning of 1987 and signed a 3-year renewable record contract with PolyGram.

She then began working with Fabrice Aboulker and Marc Lavoine as producers/writers. She released four singles with them and when her contract ended, she asked to be released from her contract. In 1988/89 she also co-presented MIDEM (world's largest music tradefair), MIPTV (world's largest TV and media industry gathering) and 'Oh! Les Filles' (Variety TV program).

Patti also did some acting, appearing in 'And So Died Riabouchinska' (Atlantis Films/Ellipse Prog./Granada TV/Wilcox Prod-Directed by Denys Granier-Deferre) as Alyce Fabien opposite Alan Bates, and as Dr. McGregor in 'Les Six Compagnons au Concours Hippique' (Ima Productions-Directed by Laurent Levy). She also made numerous guest and cameo appearances in 'Coco Rico Boy (TF1 France-Directed by Gérard Espinasse).

She continued touring and working in the music industry until leaving France in 1991, when she moved to England and married British actor Toby Rolt. They were officially divorced five years later. During the time they were married, Patti continued to write but did not perform outside of recording demos. When they became separated, she began doing smaller gigs in clubs and bars, doing cover songs (jazz, pop, rock and funk), also attending singer/songwriter evenings, becoming one of the first regulars at the Kashmir Klub in London (now The Bedford). She continued writing during this time with various people including Tom Hardwell, Dzal Martin, Claus Regli, Carrie Lennard, Ian Whitmore, Jesper Matteson and Wendon Davis.

Patti became a general practitioner counsellor and addictions therapist. She worked at Promis Treatment Centre, The Priory Hospital North London and the Capio Nightingale Hospital for the next 10 years. During the time she was working as a counsellor/therapist, her singing took a back seat and apart from an occasional private jam, she stopped singing. She began writing with Barnaby Lee and inspired by the new material, was encouraged to make an album by Guy Anderson who provided the financing and Francis Lickerish (from Secret Green), who arranged and produced the album for her. The songs on this album, 'Prairie Burn' are co-written over several years with Barnaby Lee, Wendy Thomson, Bogart Giner, Dzal Martin, Carrie Lennard, Claus Regli, Iain Whitmore and Francis Lickerish.

Patti began her teaching career in Wuhan maple leaf international school with her life partner John Smith since 2011, she spent first few years teaching English even she only had limited ESL training, she later became a librarian. She was not married to John Smith, but her students still call her as Mrs. Smith. She also held school's music dramas each year with John Smith during her stay in Wuhan, few students in dramas ended up in Berklee College of Music.

She made a podcast called "Travels with John Smith" in May, 2020 to talk about her life and travels during her time of teaching in Wuhan, China.

== Discography ==
- 1982: single 'Une espèce de Canadienne' (Pathé/Campagne/Pathé Marconi) written by Didier Barbelivien
- 1983: album and single 'Je veux l'aimer'(Pathé)
- 1984: 'Je cherche un partenaire' (Campagne/Carrere), written by Romain Didier
- 1985: 'Darling' (Carrere), written by Cécil Maury, Christian Eclement and Patti Layne
- 1987: 'Extrême je t'aime'(Phonogram) and later 'Déshabillez-moi' (Bandit/Phonogram), co-writing the B side, 'Evadez-moi' with Fabrice Aboulker, Pascal Stive and Mark Lavoine.
- 1988: 'Fille de l'hiver' (Phillips/Phonogram) written by Marc Lavoine and Fabrice Aboulker and wrote the English lyrics for 'Northern Girl' which was on the B side
- 1988: participated in 'Liban' (75 artists for Liban), a humanitarian project
- 1989: co-wrote Camelot (Philips/Phonogram) with Fabrice Aboulker
- 2010: album, 'Prairie Burn', co-written with Barnaby Lee, Dzal Martin, Carrie Lennard, Claus Regli, Iain Whitmore, Francis Lickerish, Bogart Giner and Wendy Thomson
