= À toutes les filles... =

1990 single by Félix Gray & Didier Barbelivien

Single by Félix Gray and Didier Barbelivien

from the album Les Amours cassées
- B-side: "Instrumental"
- Released: May 1990
- Genre: Pop
- Length: 4:14
- Label: Zone
- Songwriters: Didier Barbelivien, Félix Gray
- Producers: Didier Barbelivien, Jean Albertini

Félix Gray and Didier Barbelivien singles chronology
"À toutes les filles..." (1990)	"Il faut laisser le temps au temps" (1990)

"À toutes les filles..." is a 1990 song recorded as a duet by the French singers Didier Barbelivien and Félix Gray. This ballad was released in May 1990 as the first single from their album Les Amours cassées. It achieved a huge success in France, topping the chart and becoming a very popular song throughout years.

== Background, music video and cover versions ==
The song was written by the two singers, while the music was composed by Barbelivien. Jean Albertini participated in the production of the single. Background vocals were performed by Anaïs, Barbelivien's partner then. Despite the similarity of the titles, the song is unrelated to Julio Iglesias and Willie Nelson's song "To All the Girls I've Loved Before". Directed by Gerry Lively, the music video shows Gray and Barbelivien running by car while remembering her former girlfriends, the latter ones being seen in various glamorous contexts. At the end, two women make them rise into their car. The song is included on a 1990 compilation entitled À toutes les filles... and on 1996 Didier Barbelivien's album, Il faut laisser le temps au temps - Vol. 2, which contains all his duets with Félix Gray. Given the song's success, Gray and Barbelivien released three other singles: "Il faut laisser le temps au temps", "E vado via" and "Nos Amours cassées".

"À toutes les filles..." was parodied by many humorists. The most notable of them is probably that of Les Inconnus, under the title "Chagrin d'amour", with Bernard Campan as Didier Barbelivien (AKA Didier Barbelavie) and Didier Bourdon as Felix Gray (AKA Felix Grave).

== Charts performances ==
In France, "À toutes les filles..." debuted at number 23 on the chart edition of 2 June 1990, entered the top ten two weeks later, charted, and managed to dislodge Zouk Machine's summer hit "Maldòn (la musique dans la peau)" in its 19th week of presence, becoming the number-one single which climbed the more slowly at the top of the French chart. It remained for two weeks at number one, before being disloged at turn by UB40's "Kingston Town", and cumulated 23 weeks in the top ten and 28 weeks in the top 50. The single marked Barbelivien's first appearance on the French Singles Chart, although he composed a number of songs for other artists who were previously charted. Although uncertified by the Syndicat National de l'Édition Phonographique, it is one of the best-selling single of the year and of the 1990s; according to the French television show Duos de Légende, broadcast on TF1 on 19 April 2008, this song was one of the ten best-selling singles recorded as duets of all time in France.

"À toutes les filles..." was a massive hit in Belgium (Wallonia), where it totalled 22 weeks in the top three, including six weeks atop. In Belgium (Flanders), the song charted for 22 weeks in the top 50 from 14 July 1990, peaking at number six for two weeks.

On the Eurochart Hot 100, "À toutes les filles..." debuted at number 92 on 9 June 1990, reached the top twenty in the fifth week and peaked at number seven in the 21st week; after that, it kept on dropping rather quickly and totalled 20 weeks in the top twenty (five of them in the top ten) and 27 weeks in the top 100.

== Track listings ==
- 7" single
1. "À toutes les filles..." — 4:14
2. "À toutes les filles..." (instrumental) — 4:14
- CD maxi
1. "À toutes les filles..." — 4:14
2. "Te revoir à Madrid" — 3:50
3. "L'année où je t'ai perdue" — 3:03
4. "À toutes les filles..." (instrumental) — 4:14

== Personnel ==
- Design cover : FKGB
- Recording company : Zone / BMG
- Arrangements : Bernard Estardy
- Artistic direction : Jean Albertini
- Background vocals : Anaïs

== Charts and sales ==
=== Weekly charts ===
Chart (1990)	Peak position
Belgium (Ultratop 50 Flanders)	6
Belgium (Ultratop 50 Wallonia)	1
Europe (European Hot 100)	7
France (SNEP)	1
Quebec (ADISQ)	15

=== Year-end charts ===
Chart (1990)	Position
Belgium (Ultratop 50 Flanders)	4
Europe (Eurochart Hot 100)	17
France (SNEP)	2

== See also ==
- List of number-one singles of 1990 (France)
