= Déshabillez-moi =

Single by Mylène Farmer

from the album Ainsi soit je... and Avant que l'ombre... à Bercy
- A-side: "Sans contrefaçon" (1987 release)
- B-side: "Porno graphique" (live) (2007 release)
- Released: 16 October 1987; 5 March 2007
- Recorded: 1988, France
- Genre: Synthpop
- Length: 3:55 (live single version); 4:12 (live album version); 3:47 (album version)
- Label: Polydor
- Songwriters: Lyrics: Robert Nyel; Music: Gaby Verlor
- Producer: Laurent Boutonnat

Mylène Farmer singles chronology
"Avant que l'ombre... (live)" (2006)	"Déshabillez-moi" (1987)	"Dégénération" (2008)

"Déshabillez-moi" (English: "Undress Me") is a 1967 song first recorded by French singer Juliette Gréco, by Patti Layne in 1987, then by Mylène Farmer in a studio version in 1988 and in a live version during her 2006 concerts at Bercy (Paris). This live version was the second single from Farmer's fourth live album, Avant que l'ombre... à Bercy, and was released on 5 March 2007. Although it was a top ten hit in France, it achieved moderate success in terms of sales and chart performances.

== Background and release ==
The song, written by Robert Nyel and composed by Gaby Verlor, was originally recorded by French singer Juliette Gréco in 1967, and became scandalous at the time. In 1987, when Farmer wrote "Sans contrefaçon" on the edge of a swimming pool along with photographer Elsa Trillat, Gréco's version of "Déshabillez-moi" was played on radio and Trillat performed a comic strip-tease, which gave Farmer the idea to cover the song. Farmer explained : "I ran to the drugstore to buy Juliette Greco's disc. And the next day, we created a new version." "I want to highlight the humorous side of the approach. I have always more liked Barbara than Juliette Greco."

Her new version, totally different from the original one, was first not much appreciated by Gréco who deemed it as too sweet and lacked enough "bitch". The song became the B-side of her 1987 single "Sans contrefaçon" and was later included in the track listing of her second studio album, Ainsi soit je.... Seeing the public was enthusiastic about this cover, Farmer first decided to release it as a single, then abandoned the idea, as Canadian singer Patti Layne released at the same time her own version of the song, a reggae version.

In January 2006, Farmer performed the song during her series of concerts at Bercy. About one year later, while the live DVD of the concert had huge success, "Déshabillez-moi" was officially announced on 26 January 2007 as second single from the live album Avant que l'ombre... à Bercy. This choice was much appreciated by most of Farmer's fans, according to polls taken on various websites about Mylène Farmer which underlined that the song was considered as the best choice for a second live single. On 2 February, the song was aired on radio in its live version for the first time. The promotional CD was sent a few days later to the radio stations, but the song had a poor airplay and was never broadcast on NRJ. Before the CD single's content became known, a rumour had circulated that a new remix of "Je te rends ton amour" would be featured as a second title. That was erroneous, since the second track was "Porno graphique" in the 2006 live version.

"Déshabillez-moi" is available in a studio version on Ainsi soit je... and in a live version on En Concert and Avant que l'ombre... à Bercy.

== Lyrics, music and video ==
The song refers to the nudity of a woman, the latter "asking a man to undress her in different ways". In the album and live versions of the song, Farmer shows that she has humour and plays to "imitate successively the voice of a little girl, a femme fatale, a bourgeois, a managing woman..." Around the end, she yells a huge "Déshabillez-moi", and finishes the song with the words "Et vous / Déshabillez-vous !".

The video was aired on television for the first time on 15 February 2007. It is an excerpt from the 2006 concert film and does not contain new images. Farmer can be seen wearing black clothing, including a bra which seems to be made of feathers, as it can be seen on the single cover.

== Promotion and live performances ==
Farmer performed the song in two television shows in the late 1980s. First, in Les Oscars de la mode, broadcast on TF1 on 21 October 1987; at this occasion, Farmer, dressed in a black dress, played with a chair and revealed by mistake one of her breasts. She also performed in Les Uns et les Autres, aired on TF1 on 29 April 1989.

The song was performed during the 1989 and 2006 tours. During one live performance of the song in 1989, Farmer sang with a microphone on a base, and sometimes she pretended to laugh. She wore a restrictive black dress with sleeves that greatly limited her arm movement, effectively a bondage dress. The dress made her unable to undress herself, which explains why she wore it for the song whose title would be translated to English as "undress me". This is only known occasion of Farmer wearing something like that, which was clearly intended to be funny. After a last "Déshabillez-vous !" launched and an explosion of fireworks, a total blackout enabled the singer to leave the stage to take off her dress. According to Florence Rajon, "we may be disappointed by the coldness of the performance, but this song "remains one of the highlights of the concert". About the 2006 live version, author Erwan Chuberre considered the performance as being "energic" and "more rock", adding that "Farmer let herself loose on this song", performing it in a "dynamic, mischievous and playful" way; however, on some shows, she forgot a verse of the song.

== Chart performance ==
The single debuted at a peak of number ten on French SNEP Singles Chart on 10 March 2007, selling 6,369 units. It was thus the 33rd top ten of Farmer in France, which was at the time the record. Like Farmer's previous singles, it dropped the weeks after and stayed for ten weeks in the Top 50, and 17 weeks on the chart. In Belgium (Wallonia), the single was ranked on the Ultratop 40 for five weeks, from 17 March to 21 April, with a peak at number 19 in its second week. In Switzerland, the single appeared for one week, at number 81, on 25 March.

== Formats and track listings ==
These are the formats and track listings of single releases of "Déshabillez-moi", excluding its 1987 release as B-side to the 12" Maxi version of "Sans contrefaçon":

- CD single

No.	Title	Length
1.	"Déshabillez-moi" (live)	4:12
2.	"Porno graphique" (live)	4:09

- CD single - Promo

No.	Title	Length
1.	"Déshabillez-moi" (live)	4:12

- Digital download

No.	Title	Length
1.	"Déshabillez-moi" (album version)	3:47
2.	"Déshabillez-moi" (1989 live version)	3:55
3.	"Déshabillez-moi" (2006 live version)	4:12

== Release history ==
Date	Label	Region	Format	Catalog
1 February 2007	Polydor	France, Belgium, Switzerland	CD single - Promo	11420
5 March 2007	Polydor	France, Belgium, Switzerland	CD single	984 685-6

== Personnel ==
These are the credits and the personnel as they appear on the back of the single:

- Robert Nyel — lyrics
- Gaby Verlor — music
- Polydor — recording company
- Intersong — editions
- Claude Gassian — photo
- Henry Neu — design
- Made in the E.U.

== Official versions ==
Version	Length	Album	Remixed by	Year	Comment
Album version	3:45	Ainsi soit je...	—	1988	See the previous sections
Live version (recorded in 1989)	3:55	En Concert	—	1989	This version is similar to that of the album. (see Mylène Farmer en concert)
Live version (recorded in 2006)	4:12 (audio); 3:54 (video)	Avant que l'ombre... à Bercy	—	2005	This energetic version has a more rock sound. (see Avant que l'ombre... à Bercy (tour))
Single live version	4:12	—	—	2006	This version is slightly different from the album one with an introduction in fade in and an end in fade out.

== Charts ==
Chart (2007)	Peak position
Belgian (Wallonia) Singles Chart	19
Belgian Singles Chart (global)	23
Eurochart Hot 100	33
French SNEP Singles Chart	10
Swiss Singles Chart	81

Country	Certification	Physical sales
France	—	20,000
