= Don Juan (musical) =

2003 musical written by Félix Gray

- Don Juan (Comédie Musicale)
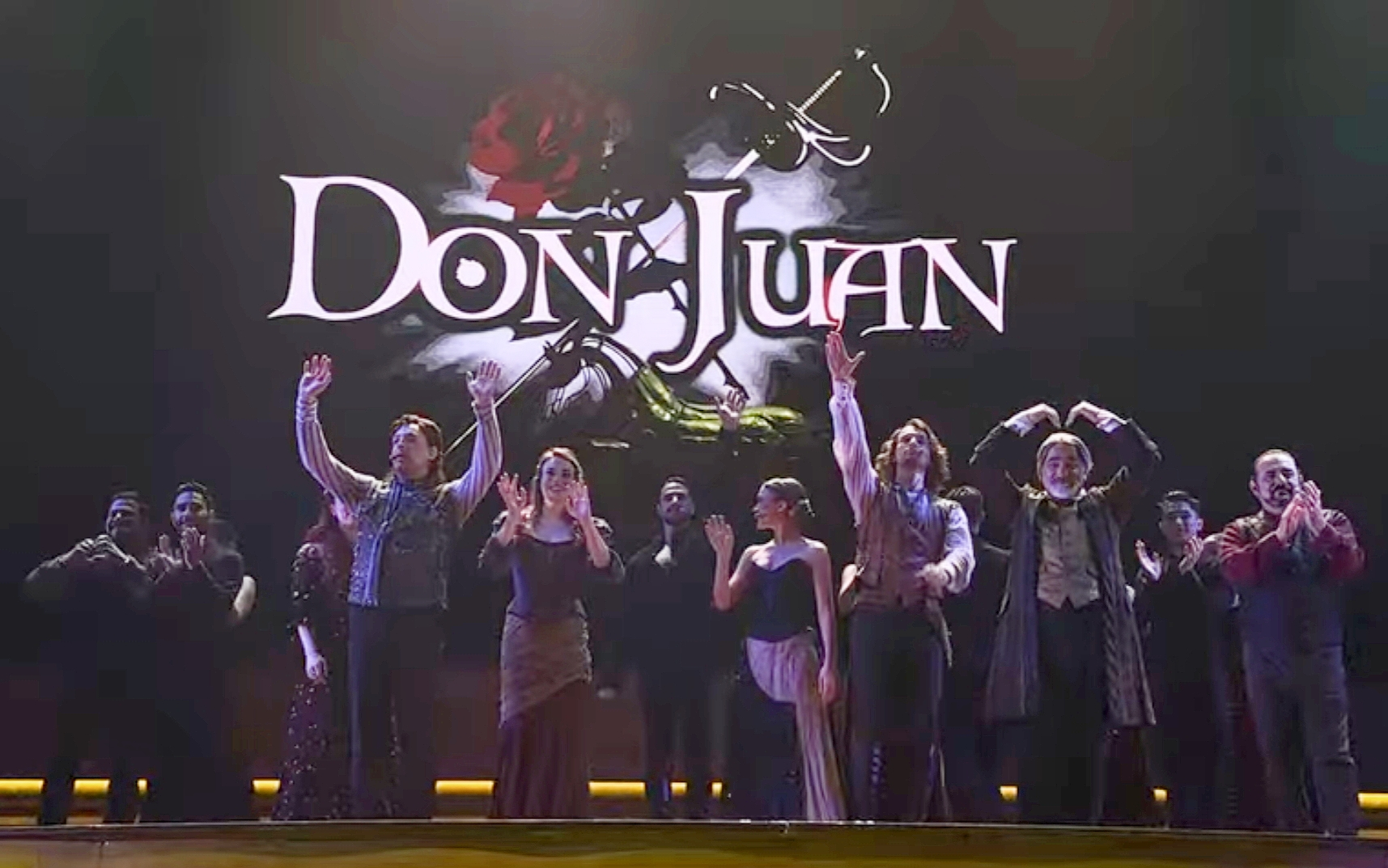
- Curtain call in Taipei (May 2024)
- Music: Félix Gray
- Lyrics: Félix Gray
- Book: Félix Gray
- Basis: Dom Juan by Molière; The Trickster of Seville and the Stone Guest by Tirso de Molina
- Premiere: February 18, 2004: Théâtre Saint-Denis
- Productions: 2004 Canada tour 2005 Paris; 2012 Canada & South Korea; 2024 Canada tour & China

Don Juan is a musical written by Félix Gray in 2003. It is loosely based on Dom Juan by Molière and The Trickster of Seville and the Stone Guest by Tirso de Molina. Don Juan was directed by Gilles Maheu and presented in Canada (mainly Quebec and Ottawa) in 2004 and in France in 2005 with a total of 600,000 viewers worldwide. The soundtrack of the musical saw sales of more than 300,000 copies. The cast also went to South Korea. The show had a run until 2006. In 2024, on the 20th anniversary of the original production, the cast went on the national tour. They also went to China (Guangzhou) and Taiwan (Taipei). The musical was also staged in Japan under the direction of Hirokazu Ikuta.

The original cast included Jean-François Breau in the role of Don Juan and Marie-Ève Janvier in the role of Maria, as well as the 2012 revival. In 2024, Gianmarco Schiaretti played the role of Don Juan and Cindy Daniel (who previously portrayed Elvira) played the role of Maria.

== Music ==
=== Musical numbers ===
Songs not appearing in the show marked by *; songs not found in the soundtrack marked by **

Disc 1 (Act I)

- Ouverture. Un grand homme est mort (A great man is dead)
- L'Homme qui a tout (The man who has everything) – Don Carlos
- Cœur de Pierre (Stone heart) – Isabel and others
- Mon nom (My name) – Don Juan
- Dites-lui (Tell him) – Elvira
- Une meche de cheveux (A lock of hair)* – Don Juan
- Mon fils (My son) – Don Luis
- Les fleurs du mal (The evil flowers) – Don Juan & Don Carlos
- Du plaisir (For pleasure) – Don Juan and others
- Vivir (Live)
- Belle Andalouse (Beautiful Andalusian) – Don Juan
- N'as-tu pas honte? (Aren't you ashamed?) – Elvira
- Les femmes (The women) – Don Carlos and others
- Reste encore (Don't go) – Don Carlos & Isabel
- L'amour quand il vient (Love when it comes) – Don Carlos & Don Juan
- Statue de Pierre (Stone statue) – Maria
- Aimer (To love) – Don Juan
- Le Sang des soldats (The blood of soldiers) – Raphaël

Disc 2 (Act II)

- Les amoureux de Seville (Lovers of Seville)
- Changer – Don Juan & Maria
- Qui? (Who?) – Elvira and others
- Je pense à lui (I think of him) – Maria
- Deux à aimer (Two in love)* – Maria & Elvira
- Venge-nous (Avenge us) – Elvira & Raphaël
- Seulement l'amour (Only love) – Don Juan & Maria
- Maria – Raphael
- Jalousie (Jealousy) – Don Juan
- Demain à l'aube (Tomorrow at dawn)**
- Pourquoi le bruit (Why the noise) – Isabel & Raphaël
- Pitie pour personne (Pity no one) – Don Juan, Don Carlos & Don Luis
- Les anges (Angels) – Maria, Elvira & Isabel
- L'enfant du diable (The devil's child) – Don Luis & Elvira
- Seul (Alone) – All
- Tristesa Andalucia
- Duel à l'aube (Duel at dawn) – Don Juan, Raphaël and others
- Je meurs d'amour (I am dying for love ) – Don Juan
- Don Juan est mort (Don Juan is dead) – All
- Encore. Les amoureux de Seville / Changer

2012 revival change

- "Deux à aimer" was replaced by "L'amour est plus fort" (Maria & Elvira)
- "Changer" in encore was replaced by "Nous on veut de l'amour" (Don Juan, Maria, Elvira & Raphaël)

=== Soundtrack ===
In 2011 a double album was released containing the songs from the production. The songs were composed by Félix Gray and the orchestra was conducted by Guy St-Onge. Singers included Guy St-Onge, Antoine Cortes, Chico Castillo, Dominique Faure, Jorge Heredia and released on Cloutier.

== Other productions ==
- In 2016 Japanese all-female theater troupe Takarazuka Revue staged the musical. It ran from June 18 to 26 in Kanagawa and from July 2 to 12 in Osaka. The production was directed by Hirokazu Ikuta, and featured Snow Troupe's Fuuto Nozomi as Don Juan and Michiru Irodori as Maria. It was the last lead role of Fuuto Nozomi before becoming the leading actress of the troupe (top star). DVD was released in 2017 and Blu-ray was released in 2020.
- In 2019 the musical was staged in Japan again and ran from August 30 to September 18 in Tokyo and from October 1 to 5 in Aichi. It was directed by Hirokazu Ikuta and featured Taisuke Fujigaya as Don Juan and Misako Renbutsu as Maria. It was the first musical of Taisuke Fujigaya, a member of jpop boy band Kis-My-Ft2.
- In 2021 the musical was staged in Japan again and ran from October 7 to 17 in Osaka and from October 21 to November 6 in Tokyo. It was directed by Hirokazu Ikuta and featured Taisuke Fujigaya as Don Juan and Kiho Maaya as Maria. This was the first performance of Kiho Maaya after leaving Takarazuka Revue as a leading actress (top musumeyaku). Hirokazu Ikuta and Kiho Maaya later got married. The DVD got released in 2022 under Takarazuka Creative Arts, including a discussion between main cast and Hirokazu, additional star angles and a footage of the set construction.
- In 2024 Japanese all-female theater troupe Takarazuka Revue staged the musical again. It was directed by Hirokazu Ikuta, and starred Flower Troupe's Sea Towaki as Don Juan (who played Raphaël in 2016 production) and Misaki Hoshizora as Maria. It was their first performance as leading actresses of the troupe (top combi).

Changes in the production

- Many new characters introduced: Juanita (one of the previous Don Juan lovers); Mayor of Seville and Sganarelle (Don Louis' servant); a few men (soldiers and Raphaël's friends) and women (soldier's lovers and Maria's friends). Ghost of the Commander and Don Louis are more active in the story. Hence, many additional scenes between the characters connect the musical numbers.
- The Ghost of the Commander has many appearances. After his death, he threatens Don Juan by saying "love will be your end". After Mon fils Don Juan once again meets him. After Reste encore Don Carlos confronts Don Juan, but the latter is distracted by the Ghost; while Don Carlos left confused, they sing L'amour quand il vient and the Ghost leads Don Juan to Maria. In Qui he reminds Don Juan of the curse once again. Later, he leads Elvira to meet Raphaël, who just returned from the war. He appears once again in Pitie pour personne. Lastly, before and during Duel à l'aube, talking to Don Juan while he fights with Raphaël.
- Elvira appears earlier. During Cœur de Pierre, she comes in with Don Carlos, asks Don Juan why he left her after a promise of marriage and is mocked by other women, including Isabel and Juanita.
- Maria and Raphaël appear earlier. After Mon Nom, a few soldiers and women gather on the square, where Raphaël asks Maria to marry him after he comes back from the war and she accepts; they sing Departure of the Soldiers (兵士たちの出発) / Farewell to a Lover (恋人との別れ) after which Maria is approached by the Mayor of Seville to build a statue of the deceased Commander. Raphaël asks Maria to stop working as it may injure her hands, but she accepts the job; Raphaël makes her promise that she wouldn't work after marriage. They briefly cross paths with Elvira and Don Carlos.
- After Le Sang des soldats there is an additional scene. Don Juan comes to the opening ceremony for the statue of the Commander. He is forced to leave the square, but he came to meet the sculptor and will not move until he does. Maria appears and to stop the guards from carrying Don Juan away, destroys her own statue. Everyone is shocked, including Maria. The two share their feelings and promise to change to be together.
- Same year, the recording of Takarazuka production was released under Takarazuka Creative Arts. New music was composed by Takeshi Oota. Act I and Act II were released separately with 16 songs each featuring all of the main cast.

Takarazuka musical numbers change (2016)

- "L'Homme qui a tout" becomes an ouverture performed by all of the main cast except Don Juan.
- New song "Departure of the Soldiers (兵士たちの出発) / Farewell to a Lover (恋人との別れ)" (Raphaël and others) appears after "Mon Nom".
- "L'amour quand il vient" is performed by Ghost and Don Juan.
- New song "The Quarrel between Don Louis and Elvira (ドン・ルイとエルヴィラの諍い) / A Message from the Lord (Un message de ton pere)" appears after "Qui?".
- "Je pense à lui" is merged with "Seulement l'amour" in one scene.
- "Deux à aimer" or "Nous on veut de l'amour" are not included.
- "Demain à l'aube" appears after "Maria".
- "Les anges", "Vivre" and "Tristesa Andalucia" are not included.
- "L'enfant du diable" is not included (Don Luis calls Don Juan "the devil's child" when talking to Elvira).
- Encore includes "Les fleurs du mal" and "Changer".

== Actors ==
Role	Original (2004)	Paris (2005)	Revival (2012)	National tour (2024)	China tour (2024)
Don Juan	Jean-François Breau (René Lajoie)	Jean-François Breau	Jean-François Breau	Gianmarco Schiaretti	Gian Marco Schiaretti
Maria	Marie-Ève Janvier (Geneviève Charest/Marie-Pier Barnabé)	Marie-Eve Janvier (Anne-Celine Lopez)	Marie-Ève Janvier	Cindy Daniel	Laetitia Carrere
Don Carlos	Mario Pelchat (Dany Laliberté)	Mario Pelchat (René Lajoie)	Étienne Drapeau	Olivier Dion	Laurent Ban/Angelo Del Vecchio
Elvira	Cindy Daniel (Marie-Pier Barnabé)	Cindy Daniel (Anne-Céline Lopez)	Natasha St-Pier	Alyzée Lalande	Alyzée Lalande
Raphaël	Philippe Berghella (Benoit Miron)	Philippe Berghella (Stéphane Neville)	Jonathan Roy	Philippe Berghella	Philippe Berghella
Isabel	Cassiopée (Geneviève Charest)	Geneviève Charest (Amandine)	Amélie B. Simard	Roxane Filion	Roxane Filion
Don Luis	Claude Leveillée / Claude Gauthier (René Lajoie)	Claude Lancelot (René Lajoie)	Normand Lévesque	Robert Marien	Stephan Cote

Japanese productions

Role	Takarazuka (2016)	Tokyo/Aichi (2019)	Osaka/Tokyo (2021)	Takarazuka (2024)
Don Juan	Fuuto Nozomi	Taisuke Fujigaya	Taisuke Fujigaya	Sea Towaki
Maria	Michiru Irodori	Misako Renbutsu	Kiho Maaya	Misaki Hoshizora
Don Carlos	Sakina Ayakaze	Kohei Ueguchi	Kohei Ueguchi	Raito Kinami
Elvira	Hitomi Arisa	Yuri Tsunemasu	Ai Tensho	Ai Mihane
Raphaël	Sea Towaki	Soichi Hirama	Soichi Hirama	Rein Amashiro
Ghost	Shizuru Karyou	Keigo Yoshino	Keigo Yoshino	Hikari Ayaki
Isabel	Keiko Miho	Sumire Haruno	Sumire Haruno	Keiko Miho
Don Luis	Naoki Ema	Shingo Tsurumi	Shingo Tsurumi	Naoki Ema
Beauty of Andalusia	Reo Kiraha	Yuka Oishi	Mizuka Ueno	Yuriya Shimon
Juanita	Rin Maisaki			Mion Sakino
