= Sans contrefaçon =

Single by Mylène Farmer

from the album Ainsi soit je...
- B-side: "La Ronde Triste"; "Déshabillez-moi"
- Released: 16 October 1987
- Recorded: 1987, France
- Genre: Synthpop, baroque pop, dark wave, new wave
- Length: 4:07 (album version); 3:50 (single version)
- Label: Polydor
- Songwriters: Lyrics: Mylène Farmer; Music: Laurent Boutonnat
- Producer: Laurent Boutonnat

Mylène Farmer singles chronology
"Tristana" (1987)	"Sans contrefaçon" (1987)	"Ainsi soit je..." (1988)

"Sans contrefaçon" ("Without Forgery/Counterfeit") is a 1987 song recorded by French artist Mylène Farmer. It was released on 16 October 1987 as the first single from her second studio album, Ainsi soit je.... It was a big hit in 1987 and is one of her three best-selling singles. It became a very popular song in France over the years and has been covered by many artists. A remixed version by the DJ J.C.A. was released on 5 August 2003 as the first single from the compilation album called RemixeS.

== Background and writing ==
Puisqu'il faut choisir
À mots doux je peux le dire
Sans contrefaçon
Je suis un garçon...

— Beginning of the refrain

Written by Farmer in 1987, the theme of "Sans contrefaçon" was inspired by two other songs, "Comme un garçon" by Sylvie Vartan and "3è Sexe" by the band Indochine. Photographer Elsa Trillat explained that the lyrics were written very quickly (taking somewhere between thirty minutes and two hours) by poolside, using a thesaurus. Laurent Boutonnat came that same day to the large Provençal-styled villa where both women were and immediately wrote the music which would accompany the lyrics. Farmer decided to change her dress style to match the song theme. In the French magazine Elle, she spotted a checkered and striped suit and asked Bertrand Le Page to wear it for the sleeve covers that illustrated the various single formats. These photos were shot in Paris by Elsa Trillat. Finally, the song was chosen to be the lead single from Farmer's second album, Ainsi soit je..., and its title became "Sans contrefaçon, je suis un garçon".

On Farmer's advice, Bertrand Le Page made numerous approaches to the NRJ radio station for it to broadcast the song twice as often, which contributed to its success. The song quickly became very popular in France and also became one of the singer's best known songs.

In September 2003, the song was released as a remixed version produced by J.C.A., becoming the first single from the album RemixeS. The song was a hit in nightclubs but did not sell very well as it was released as a vinyl record only.

== Lyrics and music ==
18th century transvestite Chevalier d'Eon is mentioned in the lyrics of the song.

The song's lyrics seem to be autobiographical. Indeed, in interviews, Farmer often explained that when she was younger, a lot of people thought she was a boy because of her androgynous look (she had short hair). To create even more doubt, she confessed she "put a handkerchief in her trousers", as it is said in the song's lyrics. About the period of her adolescence, Farmer said: "I was half-man, half woman, it was quite strange. I never liked playing with dolls at the dinette... I always preferred boys' games. I was not a tomboy, but a failed girl."

The song mentions the Chevalier d'Eon, a French diplomat, spy and soldier who presented as a man early in life but later presented as a woman, which provides some ambiguity regarding the search for identity, as well as the figure of European gay icon Eva Kotchever, whose nickname was Queen of the 3rd sex, dressed as a man in New York at Eve's Hangout and in Paris at Le Dôme Café before World War II and assassinated at Auschwitz. After that, the Resistance in concentration camps will also be tackled four years later by Farmer, in the video Désenchantée in which she also wears male clothes.

Although the song does not deal with homosexuality, it eventually became an anthem of the gay community and contributed to rise Farmer to the status of gay icon. The music, and especially the chorus, is "catchy".

Following the song's success, a website claimed that Farmer was actually a transsexual. Proponents of this theory argued that the photos of the singer's childhood were modified using Photoshop, that she did not have children, that her childhood was rarely ever mentioned and there were some inconsistencies in her interviews. This rumor was proven false and the website is now shut down.

== Music video ==
=== Production ===
The video, a Polydor production, was filmed by Laurent Boutonnat about a month after the single's release. For the first time, Farmer participated in the writing of the screenplay along with Boutonnat and initially wanted the shooting to take place in a concentration camp but this idea was rejected. The lengthy video (8'43") was shot over four days in La Hague, near Cherbourg, France, and cost about 300,000 francs (55,000 euros). It was inspired by The Adventures of Pinocchio, a novel for children by Carlo Collodi, Le Petit Cirque by Dargaud and "Les Saltimbanques", a poem by French poet Guillaume Apollinaire. In the video, the first sentence pronounced by Farmer with a small childish voice is a reference to a joke between the singer and Trillat.

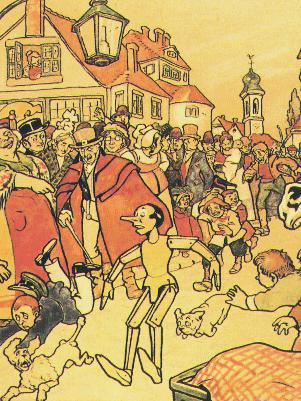
The music video for "Sans contrefaçon" is inspired by Carlo Collodi's novel The Adventures of Pinocchio (here the 1911 edition by A. Mussino).

It features Frédéric Lagache (the puppeteer, who also played in the video for "Beyond My Control") and the Swiss artist Zouc (who plays the woman). Farmer explained that she had greatly appreciated Zouc's shows, which dealt with the strange and sordid themes and the world of childhood. The two women met in the programme Mon Zenith à moi and Farmer absolutely wanted Zouc to play a role in the video for "Sans contrefaçon". The puppet was created by Benoît Lestang who shot the video for "Q.I" in 2005. François Hanss was Boutonnat's assistant (he also directed the videos for "Je te rends ton amour", "Innamoramento", "Dessine-moi un mouton" and "Redonne-moi").

=== Plot ===
The video starts with a puppet saying "Dis maman, pourquoi je suis pas un garçon?" ("Say mommy, why am I not a boy?"). Then it shows a man and his puppet (representing Farmer) who are thrown outside in the rain by two transvestites. He is kicked out of the theatre in which he performed in a show called "Sans Contrefaçon". He cleans his puppet's muddy face with utmost care and devotion and starts walking away to some desolate land. There in the middle of the misty nowhere, he encounters a troupe of athletes who are members of a circus named "Giorgino Circus." They seem to be sad, gloomy and unfriendly towards the stranger. However, a black dressed woman gives to the puppeteer a little bit of purée and he starts eating. The woman, fascinated by the doll, takes it in her arms but the other members of the circus snatch it from her and start bashing the puppet around. Terrified, the woman tries to retrieve the doll and when she succeeds, she runs away with it. The puppeteer, afraid for the future of his beloved creature, follows her to a seashore and suddenly discovers that his puppet is alive: it has turned into Mylène Farmer, who is playing with the woman. But when Farmer sees the puppeteer, she is terrified and attempts to run away. The man pursues her and manages to reach her when she falls on the sandy ground. He lifts her up, wipes her face clean, hugs her and they share a kiss. After a while, as the black-clad woman from the circus grows grim at the sight of these proceedings, Farmer turns into the puppet again, much to the chagrin of the man who is unhappy and desperate, while the circus goes away. He yells and pleads for help but all in vain. The closing sequence of the video is a dream-like vision of the puppeteer who is squatting and hugging his darling, who is once again alive.

The puppet especially created by Benoît Lestang for the music video, which resembles Mylène Farmer, and the actor Frédéric Lagache.

=== Reception and symbolism ===
This video was nominated in the category 'Best videoclip' in the 1988 Victoires de la Musique, but did not win. Interviewed in the show Nulle Part Ailleurs, broadcast on 23 November 1987, Farmer said she was surprised by the song's success, saying "I think it's the 7" that started the fastest. (...) The public says "yes" gradually and more and more strongly."

The theme of this video is that of "alienation, to be prisoner of desires of the other". Indeed, the man, as a possessive mother, has an exclusive love for his puppet. But the arrival of a third party allows it to take life, "to be born from a psychological point of view". Some interpret this video as an allegory of the Pygmalion myth, expressed through the puppeteer and its doll, while others see it as a tribute to Zouc, who disappeared from public life a short time after. According to the biographer Bernard Violet, the final sequence actually gives meaning to the history. He thinks the video is "the most moving films by Boutonnat, a masterpiece of pessimism and misanthropy, because ultimately, all the protagonists lose". The author Erwan Chuberre stated that the Gothic artist Angélique Comet was disturbed "at the emotional level" by the video.

== Promotion and live performances ==
Farmer performed the song in lip sync on 16 French television shows (all sources listed below provide different data), broadcast between 13 November 1987 and 6 February 1988 on various channels (TF1, Antenne 2, FR3, Canal+, La 5). Sometimes, she was also interviewed and, on certain shows, she performed another hit. Farmer almost always wore male clothes with black and white checks and a cap (the same costume as she wore during her 1989 tour). In 1990, she promoted the song on Swedish and Italian programmes, on 28 April and 13 July. On 18 May 1996, Farmer performed "Sans contrefaçon" just after "California", on Les Années tubes.

"Sans contrefaçon" is Farmer's only song to be performed on all her concerts tours (although it was only included as part of a medley on the Mylenium Tour). The song is the one that is included most often on the singer's various compilations and live albums. In the 1989 tour, Farmer wears a black and white checked trousers, a cap with the same patterns, and a jacket. First, she performs a choreography moving her hips, then she is joined by all dancers. Dancers come in holding hands and start a choreography during which they mime a street brawl. In the 1996 tour, Farmer wears black pants, heels, a masculine dressing gown and a scarf, and four dancers are dressed in disco drag queen, with green, yellow and blue and red wigs. The projectors are of the same colors as the dancers' wigs. In the 1999 performance, Farmer wears a black costume composed of a woven trousers open on the upper thighs, a transparent bustier, high shoes with heels, a large necklace and two iron false-buttocks; dancers have the same costume, without the jacket, and perform a collective choreography, the same as for "Pourvu qu'elles soient douces" during the 1989 tour. During the 2006 concerts at Bercy, Farmer is dressed with black feathers and had a big hat. The giant screens and the central cross display signs "masculine-feminine" that move in all directions and form somewhat like a hopscotch game. She performs the same collective choreography as on the previous tours. During the 2009 tour, Farmer and her dancers wear a white tutu, pinstripe trousers and a jacket, and perform the choreography together, while the screens in the back show chessmen. The song was also performed during her 2013, 2019 and 2023 tours.

== Critical reception ==
The song was generally well received by critics of contemporary music. For example, Music Foto declared that "Mylène hits just and strong once more (and more). (...) From the first half second of listening, the chorus (...) is in the head." Rock News said "it's delicious and enchanting". Graffiti praised the song, saying "[it] is divinely subversive and imperiously dancing" is "a piece with an unstoppable melody". Pascal Bussy, from French magazine Compact, awarded three stars to the CD maxi and added: "Without shame, [Farmer] may be to attack the UK charts." A review in Pan-European magazine Music & Media stated: "This light dance/pop tune should catch willing ears with its squeezed vocals and Police-like drive".

On the French Singles Chart, "Sans contrefaçon" appeared for 22 weeks, from 5 December 1987 to 30 April 1988. It debuted at number 21, reached the top ten four weeks later and remained inside for a total of ten weeks. On 20 February, it peaked at number two for a sole week, being unable to dislodge Sabrina Salerno's "Boys (Summertime Love)" which was number one then. It was the Farmer's first top five hit, and her third top ten hit. The song also remains Farmer's third biggest hit, behind "Désenchantée" and "Pourvu qu'elles soient douces". On the Eurochart Hot 100, it started at number 47 on 19 December 1987, peaked at number nine in its tenth week, and fell off the chart after 17 weeks, eight of them in the top 20. It also cherted for six weeks on the European Airplay Top 50, with a peak at number 25. In 1990, the song also featured on the German Singles Chart where it reached number 46 and remained on the chart for twelve weeks. In France, the single was re-edited in February 2018 and re-entered the chart at number two.

== Cover versions and soundtrack use ==
The song has been covered by many artists, including Patricia in 1998 with a dance version entitled "Listen to Your Heart" and recorded in English, Lorie in 2003 as second track on her single "À 20 ans", French rock band Armens in 2003 for their live album Sans contrefaçon - Le Live (track 1, 3:24) and released as a single, Mr Popicide in 2003, many contestants of the show Star Academy, including Anne-Laure Sitbon (2003), Élodie Frégé (2004), and Giovanni (2003, Belgian Star Academy)(these versions were not released as a single, but were only performed on TV), and Julie Zenatti in 2003 on French radio Generation Scoop in an acoustic version.

"Sans contrefaçon" is featured on the soundtrack of the 1996 French film Pédale douce, produced by Gabriel Aghion, as the first track. The song is played at the beginning of the film as well as during the final credits. In one of the editions of Trivial Pursuit, there is a question which asks: "In the song "Sans contrefaçon", what does Mylène Farmer claim?", the answer is "Je suis un garçon" ("I'm a boy").

== Formats and track listings ==
These are the formats and track listings of single releases of "Sans contrefaçon":

- 7" single - France, Canada

No.	Title	Length
1.	"Sans contrefaçon" (single version)	3:50
2.	"La ronde triste"	4:10

- 12" maxi

No.	Title	Length
1.	"Sans contrefaçon" (boy remix)	5:55
2.	"La ronde triste"	4:10
3.	"Déshabillez-moi"	3:45

- CD maxi - Europe / CD maxi - Promo - Europe

No.	Title	Length
1.	"Sans contrefaçon" (single version)	3:50
2.	"La ronde triste"	4:10
3.	"Sans contrefaçon" (boy remix)	5:55
4.	"Sans contrefaçon" (girl remix)	4:20

- Digital download (since 2005)

No.	Title	Length
1.	"Sans contrefaçon" (Ainsi soit je... version)	4:07
2.	"Sans contrefaçon" (Les Mots version)	4:15
3.	"Sans contrefaçon" (1989 live version)	6:10
4.	"Sans contrefaçon" (1996 live version)	7:00
5.	"Sans contrefaçon" (2006 live version)	4:46
6.	"Sans contrefaçon" (boy remix)	5:55
7.	"Sans contrefaçon" (J.C.A. version)	5:52
8.	"Sans contrefaçon" (2009 live version)	4:09

- 7" single / 12" maxi / CD promo

No.	Title	Length
1.	"Sans contrefaçon" (J.C.A. remix)	5:52

== Release history ==
Date	Label	Region	Format	Catalog
October 1987	Polydor	France	7" single / 7" single - Promo	887 195-7
October 1987	Polydor	France	12" maxi	887 195-1
October 1987	Polydor	France	CD maxi / CD maxi - Promo	887 195-2
October 1987	Polydor	France	12" maxi - Promo	887 241-1
1988	Polydor	Canada	7" single	PO51008
May 1990	Polydor	Germany	7" single	887 195-7
May 1990	Polydor	Germany	12" maxi	887 241-1
May 1990	Polydor	Germany	CD maxi	887 195-2
5 August 2003	Polydor	France	7" single	981 008-1

== Official versions ==
Version	Length	Album	Remixed by	Year	Comment
Album version	4:07	Ainsi soit je...	—	1987	See the previous sections
Single version	3:50	—	Laurent Boutonnat	1987	The last refrain is deleted.
Boy remix	5:55	Dance Remixes	Thierry Rogen	1987	This dance remix had a 1:30 introduction and contains the fully lyrics.
Girl remix	4:20	—	Thierry Rogen	1987	This is a dance remix in which the verses are deleted and which contains only the half of the words of the refrain.
Music video	8:43	Les Clips Vol. II, Music Videos I	—	1987	
Live version (recorded in 1989)	6:10	En Concert	—	1989	Farmer asks the audience to sing the refrain with her.
Live version (recorded in 1996)	4:23	Live à Bercy	—	1996	The version is very energetic. When the song ends, Farmer asks the audience to sing the chorus with her, saying this song "is ours".
Live version (recorded in 2000)	0:34	Mylenium Tour	—	2000	The song is included in a medley. Although Farmer starts to sing "Dis maman, pourquoi j'suis pas un garçon?", she sings first "Pourvu qu'elles soient douces", "Maman a tort" and "Libertine".
Album version	4:15	Les Mots	Laurent Boutonnat	2001	At the end, the music continues for a few more seconds.
J.C.A. remix	5:52	RemixeS	J.C.A.	2003	This is a techno remix in which the second verse and some refrains are removed; the musical introduction lasts about 1:30 and the words "Puisqu'il faut choisir" are repeated throughout the first part of the song.
Live version (recorded in 2006)	4:46	Avant que l'ombre... à Bercy	—	2006	This reorchestrated version is energetic.
Live version (recorded in 2009)	4:09	N°5 on Tour	—	2009	Many guitar sounds are used throughout the refrains and the bridge.

== Credits and personnel ==
These are the credits and the personnel as they appear on the back of the single:

- Mylène Farmer – lyrics
- Laurent Boutonnat – music
- Bertrand Le Page and Toutankhamon – editions
- Polydor – recording company
- Elsa Trillat – photo

== Charts and certifications ==
=== Weekly charts ===
Chart (1987–1988)	Peak position
Europe (European Airplay Top 50)	25
Europe (European Hot 100)	9
France (SNEP)	2
Quebec (ADISQ)	7

Chart (1990)	Peak position
Germany (Airplay Top 20)	19
Germany (Official German Charts)	46

=== Year-end charts ===
Chart (1988)	Position
Europe (Eurochart Hot 100)	70

=== Sales ===
Sales for "Sans contrefaçon"
Region	Certification	Certified units/sales
France	—	700,000
