= Pourvu qu'elles soient douces =

- French seven-inch vinyl single

Single by Mylène Farmer

from the album Ainsi soit je...
- B-side: "Puisque..."
- Released: 12 September 1988
- Recorded: 1988
- Genre: Synthpop
- Length: 4:55 (album version); 4:16 (single version)
- Label: Polydor
- Songwriters: Lyrics: Mylène Farmer; Music: Laurent Boutonnat
- Producer: Laurent Boutonnat

Mylène Farmer singles chronology
"Ainsi soit je..." (1988)	"Pourvu qu'elles soient douces" (1988)	"Sans logique" (1989)

"Pourvu qu'elles soient douces" French pronunciation: [puʁvy kɛl swa dus] (English: "As Long as They're Soft/Gentle/or Sweet") is a 1988 synthpop song by the French artist Mylène Farmer. Third single from her second studio album Ainsi soit je..., it was released on 12 September 1988. The long music video version was considered provocative, and contains various scenes of sexual content. It achieved great success in France, becoming Farmer's first number-one hit.

== Background and writing ==
After the minimum success of "Ainsi soit je...", Farmer chose to release "Pourvu qu'elles soient douces" as the third single from the album Ainsi soit je.... The song was released in a remixed version.

The song was exported outside France under the title "Douces" in Germany and the Netherlands and had a less sexy cover photo. It was also released in Japan where it was marketed as a promotional 7" with another cover design. In 2003, Paul Oakenfold remixed the song which was added on the remix album RemixeS.

== Lyrics and music ==
The music, very dynamic and effective, eclipses the words that are very daring (many people have not yet understood the theme of the song). In the refrain, Farmer addresses her lover who thinks only of her buttocks, and there are many alliterations.

The song has been said by fans, critics and Farmer herself, to be about sodomy, and even a real "ode to sodomy", while some consider it to be a logical sequel to her 1986 hit "Libertine" which includes references to prostitution. Farmer explained that "Pourvu qu'elles soient douces" is "a pamphlet written as we take revenge on men, taboos, childhood".

== Music video ==
=== Production ===
Gilles Laurent participated in the writing of the screenplay. Directed by Laurent Boutonnat, the video was shot for five days in the forest, in Rambouillet (France). It was censored on television because of its depiction of female nudity - Farmer in particular - and sex. It is entitled "Pourvu qu'elles soient douces - Libertine II" because it was a continuation of "Libertine", and takes place during the Seven Years' War, in the 18th century. Some excerpts were shown in exclusivity on 12 September 1988 in the French television program Nulle Part Ailleurs, on Canal+.

It appeared in the Book of Records in 1989 because it was at the time the music video the most expensive —at the time, it was announced that it cost more than 3 million francs (€450,000); however, subsequent sources said it was a mistake, as it cost about 1,5 million francs (€225,000) — the longest (17:52) and with the most of extras (circa 600). Many of them were made available by the French Army. Some were committed and recruits who benefited from a week of holiday, although they had much work during the shooting. Jean-François Casamayou, the director of CasaFilms, provided cranes, loumas, steady-cams and many other technical materials. There were about 50 technicians.

The horse used in the video by Farmer was borrowed from Mario Luraschi, a specialist in film stunts, which had a farm at the Abbey of Chaalis, France. The Andalusian white horse was called Llamado and was then nine years old. Farmer remade many times the scene with her galloping horse and finally succeeded; however, the dangerous scenes were performed by a stuntman. There was a lack of costumes, and those obtained were quite worn from having been used in more than 20 films about the French Revolution; this could jeopardize the production. The costume designer Carinne Sarfati and her team darned uniforms used by actors playing in the video. The editor of Tradition Magazine, Jean-Louis Viau, was responsible for ensuring the historical reality of the video and to avoid anachronisms, and taught the extras to handle weapons of the 18th century. Farmer, who shows her breasts and her buttocks in the video, said she was a little intimidated by the nudity scenes, and was afraid of commentaries by technicians, but that finally all happened very well. Yann Babilee, who played the role of the English officer, explained in an interview that he was immediately charmed by the screenplay of the music video.

=== Plot ===
The scene takes place on 18 August 1757. A young English drummer discovers the still body of Libertine, covered in blood. He calls William, an older soldier, who believes that Libertine is a man, while the young boy says she is a girl. Soon they realize that she is alive and take her to the camp for treatment. Meanwhile, the captain of the British Army realizes that his troops have taken the wrong road and are in France rather than being in Prussia (the words, in English, are subtitled in French language). Then, as the song begins, the captain brings a fruit bowl to Libertine who is sleeping in a tent. With his whip, he raises the sheet to look at her buttocks, but the young drummer enters the tent and surprises him doing that. To punish him, the captain flogs him in front of many other soldiers. He then hands the whip over to Libertine, who has been awakened by the noise, expecting her to also flog the boy, but instead she turns and whips the captain's face. In the tent, the man, very angry, throws some clothes to Libertine and looks at her when she undresses. Then she breaks a bottle over his head and runs away on horseback. The captain pursues her, finds her lying hurt near a tree, and carries her in his arms back to the camp. While they make love, the rival of Libertine, in connivance with the French army, brings prostitutes in the camp to distract the British troops. The next day, the French army bombards the English camp, while the rival shoots the captain and kills him. Libertine, who watches the scene, fights and eventually kills her with a bayonet. As the burning camps are left filled with dead bodies scattered on the ground, Libertine picks up the young drummer, while the soldiers of the French army watch them leaving on horseback.

The video shows some daring scenes, and ends with very violent scenes showing killing by gunshot and sword, as well as blood and dead bodies.

=== Reception ===
Initially, the video was to be shown in previews in movie theatres, but it was eventually cancelled because the film producers were afraid that the video was better than the film aired then. However, the video was broadcast as an exclusivity on 6 October 1988 on the Champs-Élysées, at the UGC Normandie. The video was nominated at the 1989 Victoires de la Musique, but did not win.

Some scenes, including the slow images filmed in low-angle shots which show drunk infantrymen running after scantily clad prostitutes, and wine flowing over topless prostitutes who are cavorting on the ground, were removed when the video was presented in prime time on television.

To the author Erwan Chuberre, it was a "disproportionate masterpiece for a music video and marked the spirits and the majority of journalists present at the preview (...) were won over". Other journalists were "outraged by the many images of nudity". According to the biographer Bernard Violet, the video was a "triumph" when it was released because of its production as well as its subject. The psychologist Hugues Royer considered the video as a "historical masterpiece, written as a real short movie". French magazine Graffiti awarded it as the "video of the year".

== Critical reception ==
According to France Soir, in this song, "Farmer generously lent us her fantasies on the dashing arrangements by L. Boutonnat".

In France, the single debuted at number 34 on 8 October 1988, climbed every week on the chart and eventually reached number one where it stayed for five weeks, thus becoming Farmer's first of the fourteen number ones she has obtained in the country. Then, the single dropped slowly and stayed in the chart for a total of 23 weeks, which is her third longest-running single in French Top 50. On the European Hot 100 Singles, it entered the chart at number 100, reached a peak of number six in its tenth week, and fell off the chart after 20 weeks of presence, ten of them in the top 20. It also charted for 15 weeks on the European Airplay Top 50, with three weeks at number 22, its highest position.

In terms of sales, "Pourvu qu'elles soient douces" is also Farmer's second biggest success ever, behind "Désenchantée". The single sold more than half a million copies in France by the time it was released, with 10,000 copies being sold every day at the peak of the song's popularity.

== Promotion and live performances ==
In 1988, Farmer actively promoted the song performing it in nine French television shows : Sacrée Soirée (5 October, TF1), Avis de recherche (14 October, TF1), La Une est à vous (22 October, TF1), Dimanche Martin (6 November, Antenne 2), Jacky Show (6 November, TF1), Cocoparadise (16 November, TF1), Interchallanges (20 November, TF1), Une Soirée pour les restos (17 December, TF1) and Avis de recherche (30 December, TF1). Farmer also performed the song on a Dutch (on 2 December 1990), and a Danish (in January 1991) programmes, and on Tapis Rouge (11 September 1999). To promote this song on television, Farmer wore a sequin naked-back dress and a bun as hairstyle. She performed a new choréography with her two female dancers, one of them being Sophie Tellier.

The song was performed during the 1989, 1999 (but included in a medley), 2009 and 2019 tours. During the 1989 tour, Farmer wore a red spandex pantyhose, heel boots, transparent gray veil. She performed a very dynamic collective choreography, with suggestive movements. The song began with a set of lights. Farmer, back on the podium, moved her hips and played with her microphone. The dancers came on stage by the stairs and formed a circle. While the musical bridge continued, Farmer joined the dancers who removed the bottom of her dress; two of them lifted the singer. At the end of the song, Farmer presented the musicians. On the 1999 tour, Farmer wore a black costume composed of a woven trousers open on the upper thighs, a transparent bustier, high shoes with heels, a large necklace and two iron false-buttocks; with her dancers, she performed the same choreography as when the 1989 tour. On her 2009 tour, Farmer wore a glittering short dress with red cape with hood, and her dancers a red coat; they performed the same choreography with only a few changes during the musical bridge.

== Cover versions ==
The song was covered by Lorie in 2003, by Réjane for a 1989 hits compilation, and by some contestants of the French show Star Academy 1. The song was parodied by Les Caramels Fous under the name of "Pourvu qu'elles soient grosses". However, these cover versions were not released as singles. The song was covered by Lorie, Elsa Lunghini, Jenifer Bartoli and Patricia Kaas for Les Enfoirés' 2006 album Le Village des Enfoirés and included in a medley named "Medley Uniformes".

== B-side: "Puisque..." ==
The vinyl's B-side contains a new song, "Puisque..."

Composed by Laurent Boutonnat and written by Farmer, this song is mainly instrumental. As both beautiful and sad, it deals with the issues of depression, anxiety, boredom and the desire to die. It was performed on 7 November 1988 in the programme Du Côté de chez Fred on Antenne 2, as well as during the 1989 tour (on the album En Concert, the title does not have its ellipsis), and replaced "Dernier Sourire" which was first scheduled to be performed. It was not included on Ainsi soit je... and on the best of Les Mots (but only available in the long box version of the best of). The song is played in a version instrumental in the closing credits of the video for "Pourvu qu'elles soient douces".

== Formats and track listings ==
These are the formats and track listings of single releases of "Pourvu qu'elles soient douces":

- CD maxi

No.	Title	Length
1.	"Pourvu qu'elles soient douces" (remix club)	6:32
2.	"Puisque..."	5:15
3.	"Pourvu qu'elles soient douces" (single version)	4:11

- 7" single - France, Canada, Germany, Netherlands

No.	Title	Length
1.	"Pourvu qu'elles soient douces / Douces" (single version)	4:10
2.	"Puisque..."	5:10

- 12" maxi

No.	Title	Length
1.	"Pourvu qu'elles soient douces" (remix club)	6:30
2.	"Pourvu qu'elles soient douces" (single version)	4:10
3.	"Puisque..."	5:10

- 12" maxi - Promo
- 7" single - Promo - Japan - Limited edition (50)

No.	Title	Length
1.	"Pourvu qu'elles soient douces" (single version)	4:10

- CD maxi - Crystal case - Germany

No.	Title	Length
1.	"Douces" (remix club)	6:32
2.	"Puisque..."	5:15

- 12" maxi - Germany

No.	Title	Length
1.	"Pourvu qu'elles soient douces" (club remix)	6:30
2.	"Douces"	4:10
3.	"Puisque..."	5:10

- Digital download (since 2005)

No.	Title	Length
1.	"Pourvu qu'elles soient douces" (Ainsi soit je... version)	4:52
2.	"Pourvu qu'elles soient douces" (Les Mots version)	4:16
3.	"Pourvu qu'elles soient douces" (1989 live version)	8:58
4.	"Pourvu qu'elles soient douces" (2000 live version)	5:03
5.	"Pourvu qu'elles soient douces" (remix club)	6:32
6.	"Pourvu qu'elles soient douces" (Paul Oakenfold remix)	4:03

== Release history ==
Date	Label	Region	Format	Catalog
12 September 1988	Polydor	France	7" single	887 847-7
12 September 1988	Polydor	France	12" maxi	887 847-1
12 September 1988	Polydor	France	CD maxi	887 847-2
12 September 1988	Polydor	France	7" single - Promo	6863 365
September 1990	Polydor	Germany	7" single (+ Netherlands); 12" maxi, CD maxi	887 847-7
September 1990	Polydor	Germany	CD maxi	887 847-2
September 1990	Polydor	Canada	7" single	POS 1022
September 1990	Polydor	Canada	12" maxi	887 847-1
September 1990	Polydor	Japan	7" single - Promo	DDI-3033

== Official versions ==
Version	Length	Album	Remixed by	Year	Comment
"Pourvu qu'elles soient douces"
Album version	4:56	Ainsi soit je...	—	1987	See the previous sections
Single version	4:11 ^{1} 4:05 ^{2}	—	Laurent Boutonnat	1988	This is a remixed version including many gimmicks and scratches in the musical bridge.
Remix club	6:32	Dance Remixes	Thierry Rogen	1988	This is a remixed version including many gimmicks and scratches in the musical bridge. Similar to the single version, it is longer and specially intended to the discothèques.
Music video	17:52	Les Clips Vol. III, Music Videos I	—	1988	uses the Remix club
Live version (recorded in 1989)	8:58	En Concert	—	1989	This long version has a long musical bridge played on guitar and cello.
Live version (recorded in 2000)	5:03	Mylenium Tour	—	2000	The song is included in a medley including "Maman a tort" / "Libertine" / "Sans contrefaçon"; it is performed twice (at the beginning and at the end) and is the longest one of the medley.
Album version	4:16	Les Mots	Laurent Boutonnat	2001	This version is similar to the single version, but is very slightly longer.
Paul Oakenfold remix	4:03	RemixeS	Paul Oakenfold	2003	This version is slower than the previous ones.
Live version (recorded in 2009)	5:02	N°5 on Tour	—	2009	This version uses many electronic sounds. The introduction is composed of Farmer's voiced mixed like at the beginning of the 1988 'Remix club'.
"Puisque..."
Studio version	5:15	Les Mots (long box edition only)	—	1988	See the previous sections
Instrumental version	5:15	—	—	1988	All the lyrics are deleted, but the background vocals are kept.
Live version (recorded in 1989)	8:15	En Concert	—	1989	The song is performed with a lot of emotion. In the musical introduction that lasts over three minutes, beating thunder mingle with the song's melody.

^{1} CD single version
^{2} CD maxi and vinyl versions

== Credits and personnel ==
These are the credits and the personnel as they appear on the back of the single:

- Mylène Farmer – lyrics
- Laurent Boutonnat – music
- Bertrand Le Page / Polygram Music – editions
- Polydor – recording company
- Marianne Rosensthiel – photo
- Jean-Pauk Théodule – design

== Charts and certifications ==
=== Weekly charts ===
Chart (1988–1989)	Peak position
Belgium (Ultratop 50 Flanders)	29
Europe (European Airplay Top 50)	22
Europe (European Hot 100)	6
France (SNEP)	1
Germany (German Official Charts)	87
Quebec (ADISQ)	7

Chart (1991)	Peak position
Netherlands (Single Top 100)	56

=== Certifications ===
Certifications and sales for "Pourvu qu'elles soient douces"
Region	Certification	Certified units/sales
France (SNEP)	Gold	1,000,000

== See also ==
- List of number-one singles of 1988 (France)
