= Anaïs (singer) =

French singer (born 1965)

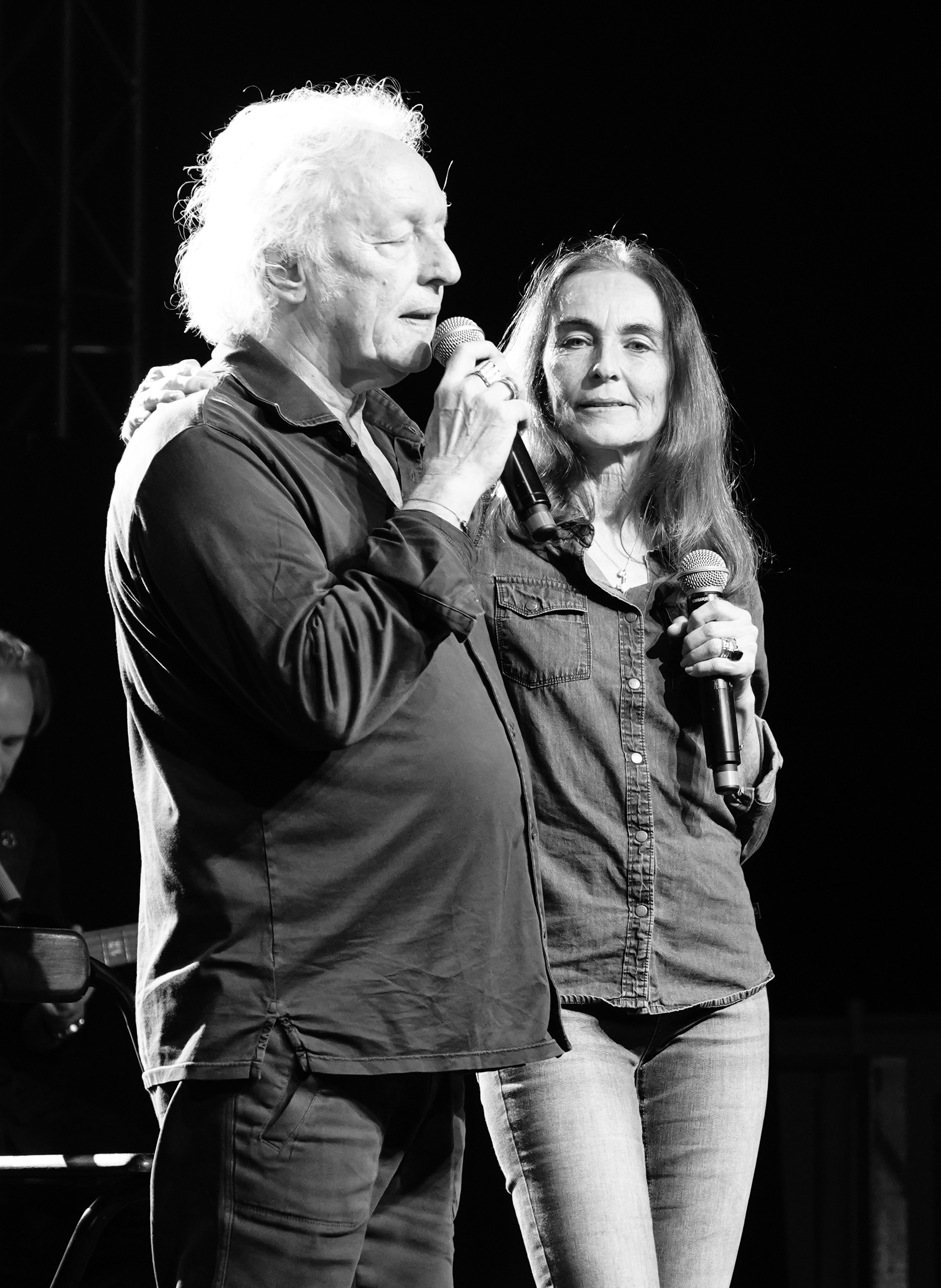
- With Barbelivien, 2025

Background information
- Born: March 1, 1965 (age 60); Paris, France
- Genres: French pop

Régine Hantelle, better known by her stage name Anaïs (born 1 March 1965 in Paris, France), is a French singer.

In 1988, she formed a duo with her twin sister - Alice et Anaïs had a successful single "A deux". In 1991, she released her first solo album "L'étudiante" that included the track "Le temps est long" (a duet with Alice), as well as "L'amour avec toi", "J't'en veux" and "Rêves des lunes" as singles.

She is known for her many collaborations with Didier Barbelivien her companion, Anaïs et Didier Barbelivien. Their album, "Vendée '93" sold 2 million copies and saw release of singles "Les Mariés de Vendée" in 1992 and "Quitter l'autoroute" in 1993.

== Discography ==
=== Albums ===
Solo

L'étudiante (1991)

Anaïs et Didier Barbelivien

- Vendée 93 (1992)
- Gens qui chante (1993)
- Quitter l'autoroute (1994)
- Toujours par la main (1994)

=== Singles ===
Alice et Anaïs

- "A Deux" (1988)

Solo

- "Le temps est long" (as duet with Alice)
- "L'amour avec toi" (cover of song by Michel Polnareff)
- "J't'en veux"
- "Rêves des lunes"
- "Au cœur de septembre" (cover of song by Nana Mouskouri)

Anaïs et Didier Barbelivien

Year	Album	Charts	Certification
Year	Album	FR	Certification
1992	"Les Mariés de Vendée"	2	
1993	"Quitter l'autoroute"	32	

Avec Didier Barbelivien

- "Te rejoindre en Vendée"
- "Les gens qui chantent"
- "Notre enfance"
- "Les moulins de mon cœur" (cover of song by Michel Legrand)
- "Un garçon nommé Jésus"
- "La valse à l'envers"
- "Les ailes d'un Whiter Shade of Pale"
- "Toujours par la main"
- "Les merveilleux nuages"
