= Il faut laisser le temps au temps =

1990 single by Félix Gray & Didier Barbelivien

Single by Félix Gray and Didier Barbelivien

from the album Les Amours cassées
- B-side: "Instrumental"
- Released: November 1990
- Recorded: 1990
- Genre: Pop ballad
- Length: 3:56
- Label: Zone Music
- Songwriters: Didier Barbelivien, Félix Gray
- Producers: Didier Barbelivien, Jean Albertini

Félix Gray and Didier Barbelivien singles chronology
"À toutes les filles..." (1990)	"Il faut laisser le temps au temps" (1990)	"E vado via" (1991)

"Il faut laisser le temps au temps" is a 1990 song recorded as a duet by the French singers Didier Barbelivien and Félix Gray. Written by Barbelivien, while the music was composed by Gray, this ballad was released in November 1990 and became the second single from their 1991 album Les Amours cassées. It hit number one on the single chart in France, and was also a success in the French-speaking part of Belgium.

== Charts performance ==
In France, "Il faut laisser le temps au temps" debuted at number 18 on the chart edition of 1 December 1990, which was the highest debut that week. It entered the top ten two weeks later and managed to dislodge François Feldman's "Petit Frank" at number one in its eighth week, jumping from number five to number one, which allowed Gray and Barbelivien to become the first duo to obtain two number one singles in France. It stayed atop for two weeks, being replaced at this position by Enigma's worldwide hit "Sadeness (Part I)", remained for three weeks at number two, then started to drop on the chart, and eventually totalled 15 weeks in the top ten and 21 weeks in the top 50.

"Il faut laisser le temps au temps" reached a peak of number four on the Belgian (Wallonia) chart, on 22 December 1990, thus failed to match the massive success of "À toutes les filles...", the duo's previous single, which was number one. It was only number 37 on the Belgian (Flanders) chart, on which it charted for a sole week.

On the Eurochart Hot 100, "Il faut laisser le temps au temps" debuted at number 39 on 15 December 1990, peaked at number eight six weeks later, and cumulated seven weeks in the top 20 and 19 weeks in the top 100.

== Track listings ==
- 7" single
1. "Il faut laisser le temps au temps" — 3:56
2. "Il faut laisser le temps au temps" (instrumental) — 3:57
- CD single
1. "Il faut laisser le temps au temps" — 3:56
2. "Il faut laisser le temps au temps" (instrumental) — 3:57

== Personnel ==
- Lyrics - Didier Barbelivien
- Music - Félix Gray
- Guitarist - José Souc
- Design cover - FKGB
- Photography - Alain Marouani
- Recording company - Zone Music
- Arrangements - Bernard Estardy
- Artistic direction - Jean Albertini

== Charts ==
=== Weekly charts ===
Weekly chart performance for "Il faut laisser le temps au temps"
Chart (1990–1991)	Peak position
Belgium (Ultratop 50 Flanders)	37
Belgium (Ultratop 50 Wallonia)	4
Europe (European Hot 100)	8
France (SNEP)	1

=== Year-end charts ===
Year-end chart performance for "Il faut laisser le temps au temps"
Chart (1991)	Position
Europe (Eurochart Hot 100)	54

== Release history ==
Country	Date	Format	Label
France, Belgium	1990	CD single	Zone Music
France, Belgium	1990	7" single	Zone Music

== See also ==
- List of number-one singles of 1991 (France)
