= E vado via =

1991 single by Félix Gray & Didier Barbelivien

Single by Félix Gray and Didier Barbelivien

from the album Les Amours cassées
- B-side: "H.L.M."
- Released: 1991
- Genre: Pop ballad
- Length: 3:37
- Label: Zone Music, CNR Records
- Songwriter(s): Didier Barbelivien, Félix Gray
- Producer(s): Didier Barbelivien, Jean Albertini

Félix Gray and Didier Barbelivien singles chronology
"Il faut laisser le temps au temps" (1991)	"E vado via" (1991)	"Nos amours cassées" (1991)

"E vado via" is a 1991 song recorded as a duet by French singers Didier Barbelivien and Félix Gray. Written by Barbelivien with a music composed by Gray, this ballad was released in 1991 and became the third single from their 1991 album Les Amours cassées, on which it is the opening track. Lyrics are in French, except for the chorus which is sung in Italian by a female voice. It was a hit in France, peaking at number five, though it did not reach the same success as the duo's previous two singles.

== Critical reception ==
When reviewing the single, Music & Media stated that "the contribution of sensual Corinne Sauvage gives this ballad a warm, Mediterranean air".

== Charts performance ==
In France, "E vado via" debuted at number 24 on the chart edition of 8 June 1991, then climbed to number 11 and entered the top ten the next week. Then it peaked at number five for a sole week, then began to drop slowly and remained on the chart for a totale of seven weeks in the top ten and 19 weeks in the top 50. It reached a peak of number six on the Belgian (Wallonia) chart, on 29 June 1990, and remained in the top ten for six weeks. It was only number 49 on the Belgian (Flanders) chart, on which it charted for a sole week.

On the Eurochart Hot 100, "E vado via" debuted at number 72 on 22 June 1991, rose to number 38 and peaked at number 25 in its fourth week.

== Track listings ==
- 7" single
1. "E vado via" — 3:37
2. "H.L.M." — 3:34
- CD single
1. "E vado via" — 3:37
2. "H.L.M." — 3:34

== Personnel ==
- Lyrics - Didier Barbelivien
- Music - Félix Gray
- Guitarist - José Souc
- Photography - Alain Marouani
- Recording company - Zone Music
- Arrangements - Bernard Estardy

== Charts ==
Chart (1991)	Peak position
Belgium (Ultratop 50 Flanders)	49
Belgium (Ultratop 50 Wallonia)	6
Europe (European Hot 100)	25
France (SNEP)	5

== Release history ==
Country	Date	Format	Label
France, Belgium	1990	CD single	Zone Music, CNR Records
France, Belgium	1990	7" single	Zone Music, CNR Records
