= Les Mariés de Vendée =

1992 single by Anaïs & Didier Barbelivien

Single by Anaïs and Didier Barbelivien

from the album Vendée 93
- B-side: "Peuple de géants"
- Released: 1992
- Recorded: 1992
- Genre: Pop ballad, chanson
- Length: 4:05
- Label: Pomme
- Songwriter: Didier Barbelivien
- Producers: Didier Barbelivien, Jean Albertini

Anaïs and Didier Barbelivien singles chronology
"Nos Amours cassées" (1991)	"Les Mariés de Vendée" (1992)	"Puy du fou" (1993)

"Les Mariés de Vendée" is a 1992 song recorded as a duet by French singers Didier Barbelivien and Anaïs. Written and composed by Barbelivien, this ballad was released in October 1992 and became the first single from their 1992 album Vendée 93, on which it is the eighth track. It was a hit in France, peaking at number two.

== Music video ==
The music video for "Les Mariés de Vendée" was directed by Éric Barbier. Initially, Barbelivien was not intended to play the role of the bridegroom but as no other actor was found, his producer proposed him to do a test with his then-partner Anaïs, which he accepted. In the scenario, Barbelivien had to get on a horse, which he managed to do by helping himself with a stool, and the scene in which he had to lift Anaïs off the ground by taking her by the waist and getting her on the horse required 22 shoots. At the end of the sequence, the horse went directly to the stable box where the ceiling was low; as a consequence, Barbelivien remained suspended from the stable railing and needed help to go down.

== Charts performance ==
In France, "Les Mariés de Vendée" debuted at number 23 on the chart edition of 24 October 1992, then climbed and entered the top ten three weeks later, and eventually reached a peak of number two, where it stayed for consecutive seven weeks, being blocked from the number one spot by Jordy's hit "Dur dur d'être bébé !". It remained in the top ten for 15 weeks and in the top 50 for 23 weeks. It reached a peak of number four on the Belgian (Wallonia) chart, on 19 December 1992, and remained in the top ten for seven weeks. On the Eurochart Hot 100, "Les Mariés de Vendée" debuted at number 91 on 7 November 1992, rose to number 11 in its eighth week, and fell off the chart after 18 weeks of presence, seven of them in the top 20.

== Track listings ==
- 7" single
1. "Les Mariés de Vendée" — 4.05
2. "Peuple de géants" — 3.28
- CD single
1. "Les Mariés de Vendée" — 4.05
2. "Peuple de géants" — 3.28
- Cassette
1. "Les Mariés de Vendée" — 4.05
2. "Peuple de géants" — 3.28

== Personnel ==
- Photography — Richard Melloul
- Graphic conception — FKGB
- Arrangements — Bernard Estardy
- Studio enregistrement - CBE - Paris

== Charts ==
Chart (1992–1993)	Peak position
Belgium (Ultratop 50 Wallonia)	4
Europe (European Hot 100)	11
France (SNEP)	2

== Release history ==
Country	Date	Format	Label
France	1992	CD single	Pomme
France	1992	7" single	Pomme
France	1992	Cassette	Pomme
