= Jean-Pierre François =

French singer and footballer (born 1965)

- Born: Jean-Pierre François; 7 June 1965 (age 61); Pont-à-Mousson, France
- Origin: France
- Genre: Pop
- Occupation: Singer
- Years active: 1989–1990
- Label: Zone Music
Association football career
- Height: 1.86 m (6 ft 1 in)
- Position: Forward
Senior career*
Years	Team	Apps	(Gls)
1982–1983	CS Blénod et Pont-à-Mousson	18	(1)
1983–1986	Dijon		
1986–1987	FC Basel	12	(9)
1987–1988	Saint-Étienne	19	(0)
- * Club domestic league appearances and goals

Jean-Pierre François (born 7 June 1965) is a French singer and former footballer. He remained particularly known for his 1989 summer hit "Je te survivrai", a love song written by Didier Barbelivien, which reached number 2 on the French Singles Chart.

== Career ==
François began his football career with CS Blénod et Pont-à-Mousson. He played for Dijon from 1983 to 1986. Following a short spell with FC Basel in Switzerland he returned to France to play for AS Saint-Étienne in the 1987–88 season.

In 1989, François began a singing career with his smash hit "Je te survivrai", then with "Il a neigé sur lacs" and "Des Nuits", released in early 1990. The same year, he also released his first and sole album entitled Des Nuits, which contains a duet with Debbie Davis, but it was not successful. He decided to leave the show-biz, and became owner of a discothèque in Saint-Cyprien.

In 2004, his daughter Sandy, participated in the French TV reality show Star Academy 4.

== Discography ==
=== Albums ===
- 1990: Des Nuits
1. "Des Nuits"
2. "L'amour sans rien dire"
3. "Pont-à-Mousson"
4. "Peut-être toi, peut-être un autre"
5. "La Gamine"
6. "Il a neigé sur les lacs"
7. "Dandy"
8. "Tout ce qu'elle désire"
9. "Je te survivrai"

=== Singles ===
- 1989: "Je te survivrai" – #2 in France
- 1989: "Il a neigé sur les lacs" – #6 in France
- 1990: "Des Nuits" – #38 in France
- 1990: "La Gamine"
- 1991: "1ère main"
- 1992: "Y'a des heures" by Jean-Pierre François and Debbie Davis
