= Ainsi soit je... =

Studio album by Mylène Farmer
- Released: 18 March 1988
- Studios: Studio Mega, Paris (France)
- Genres: Synthpop, baroque pop, darkwave
- Length: 45:47
- Label: Polydor
- Producer: Laurent Boutonnat

Mylène Farmer chronology
Cendres de lune (1986)	Ainsi soit je... (1988)	En concert (1989)

Alternative cover
- Promotional edition - Europe

Singles from Ainsi soit je...
- 1. "Sans contrefaçon" Released: 16 October 1987; 2. "Ainsi soit je..." Released: 4 March 1988; 3. "Pourvu qu'elles soient douces" Released: 12 September 1988; 4. "Sans logique" Released: 20 February 1989

Ainsi soit je... (a play on ainsi soit-il, which can mean either "so be it" or "amen") is the second album by Mylène Farmer, released on 18 March 1988. It contains the hit singles "Sans contrefaçon", "Pourvu qu'elles soient douces" and "Sans logique". Generally well received by critics, it was very successful and is, to date, Farmer's second best-selling LP.

== Background ==
After the success of the album Cendres de lune and the hits "Sans contrefaçon" and "Ainsi soit je...", Farmer had no problem releasing a second album that would be well received by the public, enabling her to consolidate her growing popularity, thus preventing her from slipping back into anonymity. The album took from five to six months to be finished. It was recorded at studio Mega, Avenue Maréchal-Maunoury, in Paris (XVIe arrondissement) under the leadership of Thierry Rogen, a renowned sound engineer who had already worked in particular with Michel Sardou.

The cover of the album shows Farmer turned sideways, accompanied by the puppet used in the music video for "Sans contrefaçon". The photographs of the booklet were made by Elsa Trillat.

The album was released in April 1988 and met great success, both critically and commercially.

== Lyrics and music ==
The texts, which contain many literary references to famous authors (such as Baudelaire, Poe, etc.), were written by Mylène Farmer, except "L'Horloge" (a poem by Charles Baudelaire), "Déshabillez-moi" (originally sung in 1966 by Juliette Gréco) and "The Farmer's Conclusion" (which is an instrumental song). The album has a melancholy and sad tone, and deals with death, suicide, madness with gloomy and desperate texts. Sexual ambiguity, sodomy and provocation are also tackled.

== Critical reception ==
Professional ratings
Review scores
Source	Rating
AllMusic	4.5/5 stars

The album was generally well received in the media and remains sometimes considered as "one of the most successful", even the singer's "best album". When the album was released, the press said: "Mylène shows an imagination and a new maturity in these charming libertine poems and her synthetic hits containing literary references" (20 Ans). This "great" (Gaipied) and "successful" (Les Dernières Nouvelles d'Alsace) album has "an intellectual and musical universe always so creative" (Gaipied). Its songs were described as "powerful, sometimes catchy and often spellbinding compositions" (Paris Nuit), whose texts are "chiseled but perfectly licentious" (France Soir). The "poetic quality of the texts" and "the sense of the melody" (Le Télégramme) were also mentioned. Rock and Folk said this Laurent Boutonnat's production is "impeccable", demonstrating his "undoubted talent". According to Télé Poche, "the time of success has come for Mylène Farmer" with this album. The journalist Caroline Bee said this album is "an ambiguous, bright, romantic and beautifully produced gem". A review in Pan-European magazine Music & Media praised Ainsi soit je..., ranking it as "Album of the week", and added: "A first-class electro-based pop LP... That sophisticated sensuality! Laurent Boutonnat's production and compositions are flowing with a commerciabdity, comparable to the works of the Pet Shop Boys. Farmer... reveals the full palette of her caressing and dreamy voice."

Some criticisms were also made against Ainsi soit je... For example, according to L'Humanité, this album uses an "old-fashioned stylistic mannerism to reinvent poetry" (L'Humanité). Rock Land qualified this album as a "second collection of bad thoughts with a spectacular flippantly", whose "B-side is flat".

== Commercial performance ==
In France, the album debuted at number 8 in April 1988, but it dropped to number 26 five months later. However, thanks to the successful single "Pourvu qu'elles soient douces" (number-one hit in December 1988), the album reached number one for two weeks in December 1988. The album managed to stay for eleven months in the top ten and about one year on the chart. On 29 June 1988, the album was certified Gold by the SNEP for 100,000 copies sold, then Platinum for 300,000 sales, then Double Platinum on 17 February 1989 for 600,000 sales, and eventually Diamond on 14 November 1989 for a minimum of 1,000,000 copies sold. The album was also released in Germany, where it reached number 47.

== Track listing ==
All lyrics are written by Mylène Farmer except where noted; all music is composed by Laurent Boutonnat except where noted.

Ainsi soit je...
No.	Title	Lyrics	Music	Live performances	Length
1.	"L'Horloge"	Charles Baudelaire		Tour 1989; Live 2019	4:07
2.	"Sans contrefaçon"			Tour 1996; Mylenium Tour; Avant que l'ombre... à Bercy; Tour 2009; Timeless 2013; Live 2019; Nevermore 2023/2024	5:22
3.	"Allan"			Tour 1989	4:46
4.	"Pourvu qu'elles soient douces"			Tour 1989; Mylenium Tour; Tour 2009; Live 2019	4:52
5.	"La ronde triste"				4:13
6.	"Ainsi soit je..."			Tour 1989; Tour 1996; Tour 2009; Tour 2009; Live 2019	6:18
7.	"Sans logique"			Tour 1989; Live 2019	4:30
8.	"Jardin de Vienne"				5:17
9.	"Déshabillez-moi"	Gaby Verlor	Robert Nyel	Tour 1989; Avant que l'ombre... à Bercy	3:45
10.	"The Farmer's Conclusion"				2:15

== Charts ==
=== Weekly charts ===
Chart (1988–90)	Peak position
European Albums (Top 100)	10
French Albums (SNEP)	1
German Albums (Offizielle Top 100)	47

=== Year-end charts ===
Chart (1988)	Position
European Top 100 Albums (Music & Media)	71
French Albums (SNEP)	2

Chart (1989)	Position
European Top 100 Albums (Music & Media)	16
French Albums (SNEP)	2

== Certifications and sales ==
Region	Certification	Certified units/sales
Belgium (BRMA)	Gold	25,000^{*}
France (SNEP)	Diamond	1,500,000
Switzerland (IFPI Switzerland)	Gold	25,000^{^}
Summaries
Worldwide	—	1,800,000
^{*} Sales figures based on certification alone.^{^} Shipments figures based on certification alone.

== Personnel ==
- Mylène Farmer – lead vocals
- Laurent Boutonnat – keyboards, synthesizer, producer
- Thierry Rogen – sound, mixing, programming
- Slim Pezin – guitar
- Bernard Paganotti – bass
- Pol Ramirez del Più (a pseudonym for Farmer and Boutonnat) – pan flute, shakuhachi
- Les Moines Fous du Tibet (a pseudonym for Farmer and Boutonnat) – background vocals
- Frédéric Rousseau – programming
- Bertrand Le Page / Polygram Music – editions (tracks 1–8, 10), Intersong Paris editions (track 9)
- André Perriat (Top Master) – mastering, engraving
- Elsa Trillat – photo
- Jean-Paul Théodule – model
- Benoît Lestang – puppet
- Bertrand Le Page – management
- Recorded and mixed at Studio Mega

== Release history ==
Date	Label	Region	Format	Catalog
1988	Polydor	France	CD	835654-2
1988	Polydor	France	Picture CD	835654-2
1988	Polydor	France	12"	835564-1
1988	Polydor	France	Cassette	835465-4
1988	Polydor	France	Collector edition	?
1988	Polydor	Allemagne	CD	835564-1
1988	Polydor	Allemagne	12"	835564-2
1988	Polydor	Canada	12"	835564-1
1988	Polydor	Canada	Promo 12"	835564-1
1988	Polydor	Canada	Cassette	835564-4
1988	Polydor	Italy	Cassette	835564-4
1988	Polydor	Japan	CD	POCP1001
1988	Polydor	Japan	Promo CD	POCP1001
1988	Polydor	Korea	12"	RG2039
1988	Polydor	Netherlands	Cassette	835564-4
1988	Polydor	Spain	12"	835564-1
1994	Polygram	France	CD	8355642
1998	Polygram France	France	CD	835564
2005	Polydor	France	Digital	—
2005	Universal	France	CD - Digipack	9828262

== Formats ==
France

- 12"
- CD
- CD – Picture disc
- Cassette
- CD – Digipack (since 2005)

Other countries

- Collector edition – Promo – Europe (Germany, Italy, UK, Spain)^{1}
- 12" – Spain
- 12" – Korea
- 12" – Canada
- 12" – Germany

- 12" – Promo – Canada
- CD – Germany
- CD – Japan
- CD – Taïwan
- CD – Promo – Japan
- Cassette – Netherlands
- Cassette – Italy
- Cassette – Canada

^{1} Contains the CD maxi for "Sans contrefaçon", the CD single for "Ainsi soit je...", the biography of Farmer translated into the language of the country, a documentary on video cassette and a lighter.
