= La Gitane (Ma tête tourne...) =

1988 single by Félix Gray

Single by Félix Gray
- B-side: "Instrumental"
- Released: February 1988
- Recorded: 1987
- Studio: Studio Guillaume Tell (recording)
- Genre: Pop, chanson
- Length: 4:20
- Label: EMI, Pathé-Marconi
- Songwriter(s): Félix Gray
- Producer(s): D.J.R.T.

Félix Gray singles chronology
| "La Gitane (Ma tête tourne...)" (1988) | "Fille des nuits" (1988) |

"La Gitane", also titled "La Gitane (Ma tête tourne...)" as on the second edition of the single cover, is a 1987 pop song recorded by French singer and songwriter Félix Gray. Written and composed by Gray, it was his debut single and was released in February 1988. It achieved success in France where it reached number three.

The song has Spanish sounds. Its original title "La Gitane" was changed to "La Gitane (Ma tête tourne...)" after a massive airplay in order to identify easier the song (the words "Ma tête tourne..." are said in the chorus, while "La Gitane" is never mentioned in the song). In 2016, the song was included on Gray's best of compilation 14 Succès, on which it appears as the fifth track.

== Chart performance ==
In France, "La Gitane (Ma tête tourne...)" debuted at number 42 on the chart edition of 27 February 1988, entered the top ten in its sixth week and remained there for 13 weeks; it reached number three for a sole week, in its 11th week, and fell off the top 50 straight from number 27 after 21 weeks of presence. It earned a Silver disc, awarded by the Syndicat National de l'Édition Phonographique. On the European Hot 100 Singles, it started at number 94 on 19 March 1988 and reached a peak of number eight in its tenth week, and remained on the chart for a total of 20 weeks, nine of them in the top 20.

== Track listings ==
- 7" single 1
1. "La Gitane" — 4:20
2. "La Gitane" (instrumental) — 4:20
- 7" single 2
1. "La Gitane (Ma tête tourne...)" — 4:20
2. "La Gitane (Ma tête tourne...)" (instrumental) — 4:20
- 12" maxi
1. "La Gitane (Ma tête tourne...)" — 5:48
2. "La Gitane (Ma tête tourne...)" (instrumental) — 4:20

== Charts and certifications ==
=== Weekly charts ===
| Chart (1988) | Peak position |
|---|---|
| Europe (European Hot 100) | 8 |
| France (SNEP) | 3 |

| Chart (2013) | Peak position |
|---|---|
| France (SNEP) | 197 |

=== Year-end charts ===
| Chart (1988) | Position |
|---|---|
| Europe (European Hot 100) | 58 |

=== Certifications ===
Certifications for "La Gitane (Ma tête tourne...)"
| Region | Certification | Certified units/sales |
|---|---|---|
| France (SNEP) | Silver | 250,000^{*} |
^{*} Sales figures based on certification alone.
