= Didier Barbelivien =

French singer-songwriter (born 1954)

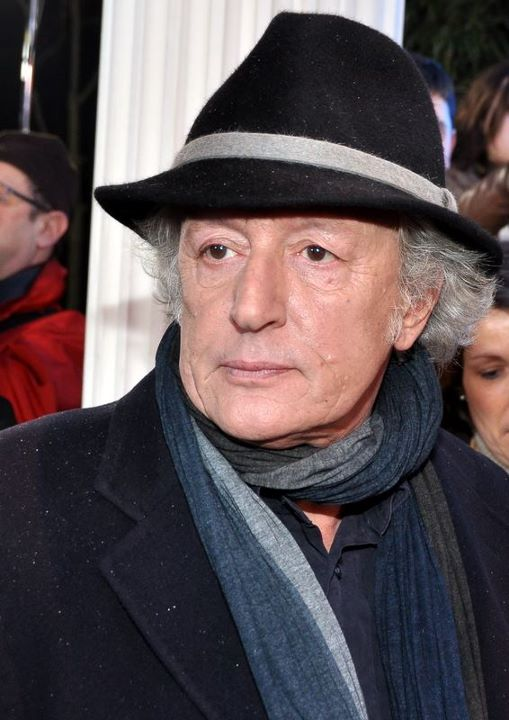
- Barbelivien in 2012

Background information
- Born: Didier Barbelivien; 10 March 1954 (age 71); 14th arrondissement of Paris, France
- Origin: Paris, France
- Genres: Pop music
- Occupations: Author; Lyricist; Songwriter; Singer
- Years active: 1974–present

Didier René Henri Barbelivien (French pronunciation: [didje ʁəne ɑ̃ʁi baʁbəlivjɛ̃]; born 10 March 1954 in Paris) is a French author, lyricist, songwriter and singer. Beginning in the 1970s, he wrote a number of successful songs for artists such as: Dalida, Johnny Hallyday, Michel Sardou, Daniel Guichard, Claude François, Gilbert Montagné, Sylvie Vartan, Patti Layne, Gilbert Bécaud, Enrico Macias, Demis Roussos, Mireille Mathieu, Hervé Vilard, Michèle Torr, C. Jérôme, Christophe, Julio Iglesias, Sheila, Nicole Croisille, Patricia Kaas, Éric Charden, Jean-Pierre François, Michel Delpech, Philippe Lavil, Elsa, Gérard Lenorman, Ringo, Garou, Corynne Charby, David and Jonathan, and Caroline Legrand among others.

In the 1980s and 1990s, he enjoyed popular success singing his own songs, many of which climbed quickly to the top of the French charts of the era. In the 1990s, he sang several titles with Félix Gray.

He was made Chevalier (Knight) of the Légion d'honneur in 2009.

== Discography ==
=== Albums ===
Solo

- 1980: Elle
- 1982: Elsa
- 1985: C'est de quel côté la mer?
- 1987: Peut-être toi, peut-être une autre
- 1989: Des mots d'émotion
- 1995: Que l'amour
- 1997: Yesterday les Beatles
- 2001: Chanteur français (FR #130)
- 2003: Léo
- 2005: Envoie les clowns (FR #56)
- 2007: État des lieux: J'écrivais des chansons (FR #96)
- 2009: Atelier d'artistes (FR #8)
- 2011: Mes préférences (FR #4)
- 2013: Dédicacé (FR #27)
- 2016: Amours de moi (FR #84)

Félix Gray and Didier Barbelivien

- 1991: Nos amours cassées

Anaïs et Didier Barbelivien

- 1992: Vendée 93
- 1993: Gens qui chantent
- 1994: Toujours par la main
- 1994: Quitter l'autoroute

=== Singles ===
(selective) Félix Gray and Didier Barbelivien

- 1990: "À toutes les filles..." (FR #1)
- 1990: "Il faut laisser le temps au temps" (FR #1)
- 1991: "E vado via" (FR #5)
- 1991: "Nos amours cassées" (FR #20)

Anaïs et Didier Barbelivien

- 1992: "Les Mariés de Vendée" (FR #2)
- 1993: "Quitter l'autoroute" (FR #32)

Solo

- 1993: "Puy du fou" (FR #39)
