= Félix Gray =

French singer and songwriter

Félix Boutboul, best known by the pseudonym of Félix Gray (born 28 June 1958), is a French singer and songwriter.

He was born in Tunis. He has a daughter named Marie-Charlotte, born on 7 January 1991.

== Compositions ==
=== Songs ===
He has composed texts for various artists :

- "Les Envies d'amour" for Adeline Blondieau Hallyday (1991)
- "Should I Leave" for David Charvet (1997)
- "Au Café des délices" for Patrick Bruel (1999)

=== Musical comedies ===
In 2004, he wrote the successful French language musical Don Juan, which opened in Montreal, then went on to be staged in Paris and other parts of the world.

In March 2009, his new musical show "Sherazade, les milles et unes nuits" opened at the Olympia of Montreal. In December 2011, it was featured in Paris. There are negotiations for shows in Las Vegas and Dubai.

== Discography ==
=== Albums ===
- Les Amours cassées, with Didier Barbelivien (1991)
- Face cachée (1992)
- 14 succès + 1 inédit (1996)
- Félix Gray (2001)

=== Singles ===
- "La Gitane (Ma tête tourne...)" (1987) – #3 in France
- "Histoire d'amour ratée" (1987)
- "Fille des nuits" (1988)
- "Te revoir à Madrid" (1989)
- "À toutes les filles..." (1990) with Didier Barbelivien – #1 in France
- "Il faut laisser le temps au temps" (1991) with Didier Barbelivien – #1 in France
- "E vado via" (1991) with Didier Barbelivien – #5 in France
- "Nos amours cassés" (1991) with Didier Barbelivien – #20 in France
- "Mourir pour elle" (1992)
- "Chanson pour Marie" (1992)
- "Les jours où j'ai mal" (1992)
- "Un autre amour" (1992)
- "Tellement je t'aime" (1992)
- "Lettre apple" (1992)
- "Banlieue dortoir" (1992)
- "La plus belle fille du monde" (1992)
- "A quoi tu penses ?" (1992)
- "Tombe la nuit" (1992)
- "Un seul blues" (1992)
- "Bahia" (1994)
- "Pour un amour" (Le prix pour ça) (1996)
- "Dieu me pardonne" (2001)
- "Lequel de nous" (2001)
- "Tomber les voiles" (2001)
- "Jérusalem" (2001)
- "Toute une vie" (2001)
- "Dis lui" (2001)
- "T'attends quoi" (2001)
- "Dire" (2001)
- "Que de l'amour" (2001)
- "Je t'attends" (2001)
- "Un monde à part" (2001)
- "L'histoire recommence" (2001) with Didier Barbelivien
- "J'ai fait chanteur" (2001)

== Theater ==
- 2004: Don Juan
- 2009: Shérazade les mille et une nuits
