= Timeless (Mylène Farmer tour) =

2013 concert tour by Mylène Farmer

- Tour by Mylène Farmer
- Promotional poster for the tour
- Associated album: Monkey Me
- Start date: 7 September 2013
- End date: 6 December 2013
- Legs: 1
- No. of shows: 39 in Europe

Mylène Farmer concert chronology
- Mylène Farmer en tournée (2009); Timeless (2013); Mylène Farmer 2019 (2019)

Timeless (stylized as Timel3ss) was the sixth concert tour by French recording artist, Mylène Farmer. The tour supported the singer's ninth studio album, Monkey Me (2012). The tour began on 7 September 2013 and ended on 6 December 2013. It played 39 shows in five countries, performing for over 500,000 people.

== Setlist ==
The following setlist was obtained from the concert held on 7 September 2013; at the Palais omnisports de Paris-Bercy in Paris, France. It does not represent all concerts for the duration of the tour.

1. "Video Sequence"
2. "À force de..."
3. "Comme j'ai mal"
4. "C'est une belle journée"
5. "Monkey Me"
6. "Slipping Away (Crier la vie)" (Virtual duet with Moby)
7. "Elle a dit" (Replaced by "L'amour n'est rien..." in Russia)
8. "Oui mais... non"
9. "Dance Sequence" (contains elements of "Piano Trio No. 2")
10. "Mad World" (duet with Gary Jules)
11. "Les mots" (duet with Jules)
12. "Je te dis tout"
13. "Et pourtant..."
14. "Désenchantée"
15. "Bleu Noir"
16. "Diabolique mon ange"
17. "Sans contrefaçon"
18. "Maman a tort"
19. "Je t'aime mélancolie"
20. "XXL" (contains elements of "A-t-on jamais")
21. "À l'ombre"

Encore

22. "Inséparables"
23. "Rêver"

== Tour dates ==
Date	City	Country	Venue
Europe
7 September 2013	Paris	France	Palais Omnisports de Paris-Bercy
8 September 2013	Paris	France	Palais Omnisports de Paris-Bercy
10 September 2013	Paris	France	Palais Omnisports de Paris-Bercy
11 September 2013	Paris	France	Palais Omnisports de Paris-Bercy
13 September 2013	Paris	France	Palais Omnisports de Paris-Bercy
14 September 2013	Paris	France	Palais Omnisports de Paris-Bercy
17 September 2013	Paris	France	Palais Omnisports de Paris-Bercy
18 September 2013	Paris	France	Palais Omnisports de Paris-Bercy
20 September 2013	Paris	France	Palais Omnisports de Paris-Bercy
21 September 2013	Paris	France	Palais Omnisports de Paris-Bercy
24 September 2013	Lyon	France	Halle Tony Garnier
25 September 2013	Lyon	France	Halle Tony Garnier
27 September 2013	Lyon	France	Halle Tony Garnier
28 September 2013	Lyon	France	Halle Tony Garnier
1 October 2013	Pérols	France	Park&Suites Arena
2 October 2013	Pérols	France	Park&Suites Arena
5 October 2013	Pérols	France	Park&Suites Arena
8 October 2013	Saint-Herblain	France	Zénith de Nantes Métropole
9 October 2013	Saint-Herblain	France	Zénith de Nantes Métropole
11 October 2013	Saint-Herblain	France	Zénith de Nantes Métropole
12 October 2013	Saint-Herblain	France	Zénith de Nantes Métropole
15 October 2013	Eckbolsheim	France	Zénith de Strasbourg
16 October 2013	Eckbolsheim	France	Zénith de Strasbourg
18 October 2013	Geneva	Switzerland	SEG Geneva Arena
19 October 2013	Geneva	Switzerland	SEG Geneva Arena
27 October 2013	Minsk	Belarus	Minsk-Arena
1 November 2013	Moscow	Russia	Olimpiyskiy
4 November 2013	Saint Petersburg	Russia	SKK Peterburgsky
13 November 2013	Brussels	Belgium	Palais 12
15 November 2013	Brussels	Belgium	Palais 12
16 November 2013	Brussels	Belgium	Palais 12
20 November 2013	Douai	France	Gayant Expo
22 November 2013	Douai	France	Gayant Expo
23 November 2013	Douai	France	Gayant Expo
26 November 2013	Toulouse	France	Zénith de Toulouse Métropole
27 November 2013	Toulouse	France	Zénith de Toulouse Métropole
30 November 2013	Toulouse	France	Zénith de Toulouse Métropole
3 December 2013	Cournon-d'Auvergne	France	Zénith d'Auvergne
6 December 2013	Nice	France	Palais Nikaïa

== Broadcasts and recordings ==
The concerts in Lyon were recorded for a concert film and live album. The live album, Timeless 2013 was released on 9 December 2013. The concert film, Timeless 2013: Le Film was screened in more than one hundred cinemas across France, Belgium and Switzerland on 27 March 2014.
