= Timeless 2013 =

Live album by Mylène Farmer
- Released: 9 December 2013
- Recorded: 24, 25, 27, 28 September 2013
- Studios: Halle Tony Garnier, Lyon, France
- Genres: Pop, rock
- Label: Polydor

Mylène Farmer chronology
Monkey Me (2012)	Timeless 2013 (2013)	Interstellaires (2015)

Singles from Timeless 2013
- 1. "Diabolique mon ange" Released: 4 December 2013

Timeless 2013 is the sixth live album by French singer-songwriter Mylène Farmer. It was released on 9 December 2013 in France by Polydor Records. The album documents the Timeless tour's performances at the Halle Tony Garnier in Lyon, France. A concert film directed by François Hanss was screened in more than one hundred cinemas across France, Belgium and Switzerland on 27 March 2014. The film was released on DVD and Blu-Ray on 16 May 2014. The album does not contain "Elle a dit", "Je te dis tout" and "Et pourtant...".

== Background ==
Three days before the launch of the Timeless Tour, Francois Hanss confirmed on Twitter that the shows in Lyon, France will be filmed for a future concert film. Rumors began to surface about a possible release date for a live album. French record stores received pre-order forms for the album, thus confirming the release date of the album for 9 December 2013. On 30 October 2013, Polydor Records officially announced the title and track listing for Timeless 2013.

== Promotion ==
To promote the album, Polydor launched a micro site for the album. Five teaser videos are scheduled to be released at 6 pm on 25 November 29 November 2 December 4 and 6 December. A 20-second television spot has been released on 27 November 2013. On 2 December 2013, Polydor announced that "Diabolique mon ange" will be the first single from the live album. It was released to radio stations on 4 December 2013.

"Timeless 2013" had record-breaking sales for a live album in France. It debuted at No. 2. During its first week of release, the album has sold over 70,000 copies in one week (much more than her two previous live albums, even though they had charted at No. 1); the other two biggest-selling live albums of the year in France, Johnny Hallyday and Muse, had sold around 30,000 copies each during their first week, making Farmer's live album a record-breaking commercial hit.

== Track listing ==
All lyrics are written by Mylène Farmer except where noted; all music is composed by Laurent Boutonnat except where noted.

Disc one
No.	Title	Lyrics	Music	Original album	Length
1.	"Timeless Genesis"				4:30
2.	"À force de..."			Monkey Me	4:24
3.	"Comme j'ai mal"			Anamorphosée	3:52
4.	"C'est une belle journée"			Les Mots	6:17
5.	"Monkey Me"			Monkey Me	4:51
6.	"Slipping Away (Crier la vie)" (virtual duet with Moby)	Farmer; Moby	Moby	Go	3:54
7.	"Oui mais... non"		RedOne	Bleu noir	4:36
8.	"Mad World" (duet with Gary Jules)	Roland Orzabal	Roland Orzabal		3:45
9.	"Les Mots" (duet with Gary Jules)			Les Mots	5:13
10.	"Désenchantée"			L'autre...	7:03
11.	"Bleu Noir"		Moby	Bleu noir	4:14
12.	"Diabolique mon ange"		Darius Keeler	Bleu noir	6:53

Disc two
No.	Title	Music	Original album	Length
1.	"Sans contrefaçon"		Ainsi soit je...	4:41
2.	"Je t'aime mélancolie"		L'autre...	6:35
3.	"XXL" (Contains elements of "A-t-on jamais...")		Anamorphosée	4:42
4.	"À l'ombre"		Monkey Me	5:06
5.	"Inséparables"	Moby	Bleu noir	4:58
6.	"Rêver"		Anamorphosée	6:27

== Album charts ==
=== Weekly album charts ===
Chart (2013)	Peak position
Belgian Albums (Ultratop Flanders)	82
Belgian Albums (Ultratop Wallonia)	2
French Albums (SNEP)	2
Swiss Albums (Schweizer Hitparade)	13
Swiss Albums (Schweizer Hitparade Romandy)
Greek Albums (IFPI)	69

=== Year-end album charts ===
Chart (2013)	Position
Belgian Albums (Ultratop Wallonia)	91
French Albums (SNEP)	27
Chart (2014)	Position
Belgian Albums (Ultratop Wallonia)	36
French Albums (SNEP)	127

== DVD charts ==
=== Weekly DVD charts ===
Chart (2014)	Peak position
Belgian DVDs (Ultratop Flanders)	1
Belgian DVDs (Ultratop Wallonia)	1
Dutch DVDs (MegaCharts)	8
French Music DVD (SNEP)	1
Swiss Music DVD (Schweizer Hitparade)	1

=== Year-end DVD charts ===
Chart (2014)	Position
Belgian DVDs (Ultratop Flanders)	22
Belgian DVDs (Ultratop Wallonia)	2
Chart (2015)	Position
Belgian DVDs (Ultratop Wallonia)	13

== Certifications and sales ==
Region	Certification	Certified units/sales
Album
Belgium (BRMA)	Gold	15,000^{*}
France (SNEP)	Platinum	160,000
DVD
France (SNEP)	3× Diamond	180,000^{*}
^{*} Sales figures based on certification alone.
