= List of number-one hits of 2012 (France) =

This is a list of the French SNEP Top 100 Singles and Top 200 Albums number-ones of 2012.

== Number ones by week ==
=== Singles chart ===
Week	Issue date	Artist(s)	Title	Sales	Ref.
1	8 January	Shakira	"Je l'aime à mourir"	9,986	
2	15 January	Shakira	"Je l'aime à mourir"	9,929	
3	22 January	Michel Teló	"Ai Se Eu Te Pego!"	9,476	
4	29 January	Shakira	"Je l'aime à mourir"	16,684	
5	5 February	Michel Teló	"Ai Se Eu Te Pego!"	15,777	
6	12 February	Michel Teló	"Ai Se Eu Te Pego!"	18,371	
7	19 February	Michel Teló	"Ai Se Eu Te Pego!"	21,038	
8	26 February	Michel Teló	"Ai Se Eu Te Pego!"	21,293	
9	4 March	Michel Teló	"Ai Se Eu Te Pego!"	22,613	
10	11 March	Michel Teló	"Ai Se Eu Te Pego!"	19,988	
11	18 March	Michel Teló	"Ai Se Eu Te Pego!"	16,729	
12	25 March	Michel Teló	"Ai Se Eu Te Pego!"	12,101	
13	1 April	Gotye featuring Kimbra	"Somebody That I Used to Know"	13,024	
14	8 April	Gotye featuring Kimbra	"Somebody That I Used to Know"	15,504	
15	15 April	Gotye featuring Kimbra	"Somebody That I Used to Know"	14,593	
16	22 April	Gotye featuring Kimbra	"Somebody That I Used to Know"	13,955	
17	29 April	Gotye featuring Kimbra	"Somebody That I Used to Know"	12,949	
18	6 May	Gotye featuring Kimbra	"Somebody That I Used to Know"	11,638	
19	13 May	Gotye featuring Kimbra	"Somebody That I Used to Know"	11,544	
20	20 May	Gotye featuring Kimbra	"Somebody That I Used to Know"	11,189	
21	27 May	Gotye featuring Kimbra	"Somebody That I Used to Know"	8,553	
22	3 June	Gusttavo Lima	"Balada"	12,101	
23	10 June	Gusttavo Lima	"Balada"	11,057	
24	17 June	Carly Rae Jepsen	"Call Me Maybe"	9,173	
25	24 June	Tacabro	"Tacata'"	9,877	
26	1 July	Carly Rae Jepsen	"Call Me Maybe"	8,866	
27	8 July	Carly Rae Jepsen	"Call Me Maybe"	9,348	
28	15 July	Carly Rae Jepsen	"Call Me Maybe"	8,536	
29	22 July	Carly Rae Jepsen	"Call Me Maybe"	8,414	
30	29 July	Carly Rae Jepsen	"Call Me Maybe"	7,839	
31	5 August	Carly Rae Jepsen	"Call Me Maybe"	8,255	
32	12 August	Carly Rae Jepsen	"Call Me Maybe"	6,879	
33	19 August	Alex Ferrari	"Bara Bará Bere Berê"	6,218	
34	26 August	Alex Ferrari	"Bara Bará Bere Berê"	6,570	
35	2 September	Carly Rae Jepsen	"Call Me Maybe"	8,725	
36	9 September	Carly Rae Jepsen	"Call Me Maybe"	9,132	
37	16 September	Carly Rae Jepsen	"Call Me Maybe"	9,696	
38	23 September	C2C	"Down the Road"	7,987	
39	30 September	Rihanna	"Diamonds"	12,238	
40	7 October	Rihanna	"Diamonds"	12,073	
41	14 October	Rihanna	"Diamonds"	12,805	
42	21 October	PSY	"Gangnam Style"	12,204	
43	28 October	PSY	"Gangnam Style"	12,445	
44	4 November	Adele	"Skyfall"	27,242	
45	11 November	Adele	"Skyfall"	24,186	
46	18 November	Adele	"Skyfall"	18,310	
47	25 November	Adele	"Skyfall"	15,440	
48	2 December	Mylène Farmer	"À l'ombre"	22,027	
49	9 December	Adele	"Skyfall"		
50	16 December	Adele	"Skyfall"		
51	23 December	PSY	"Gangnam Style"		
52	30 December	PSY	"Gangnam Style"		

=== Albums chart ===
As compiled by Charts in France including both digital and physical sales, not representing SNEP charts.

Week	Issue date	Artist(s)	Title	Sales	Ref.
1	8 January	Adele	21	28,817	
2	15 January	Adele	21	30,288	
3	22 January	Adele	21	25,562	
4	29 January	Adele	21	21,780	
5	5 February	Lana Del Rey	Born to Die	48,791	
6	12 February	Lana Del Rey	Born to Die	23,888	
7	19 February	Adele	21	39,145	
8	26 February	Adele	21	23,982	
9	4 March	Adele	21	23,095	
10	11 March	Sexion d'Assaut	L'Apogée	65,949	
11	18 March	Les Enfoirés	Le Bal des Enfoirés	137,730	
12	25 March	Les Enfoirés	Le Bal des Enfoirés	114,004	
13	1 April	Les Enfoirés	Le Bal des Enfoirés	44,997	
14	8 April	Les Enfoirés	Le Bal des Enfoirés	29,138	
15	15 April	Sexion d'Assaut	L'Apogée	16,109	
16	22 April	Sexion d'Assaut	L'Apogée	13,902	
17	29 April	Compilation	NRJ Hit Music Only 2012	17,306	
18	6 May	Compilation	NRJ Hit Music Only 2012	17,368	
19	13 May	Sexion d'Assaut	L'Apogée	11,860	
20	20 May	Les Stentors	Voyage en France	31,773	
21	27 May	Les Stentors	Voyage en France	21,830	
22	3 June	Yannick Noah	Hommage	35,048	
23	10 June	Yannick Noah	Hommage	17,915	
24	17 June	Les Stentors	Voyage en France	17,513	
25	24 June	Sexion d'Assaut	L'Apogée	10,976	
26	1 July	Shy'm	Caméléon	19,962	
27	8 July	Compilation	NRJ Summer Hits Only 2012	26,563	
28	15 July	Compilation	NRJ Summer Hits Only 2012	20,552	
29	22 July	Compilation	NRJ Summer Hits Only 2012	17,805	
30	29 July	Compilation	NRJ Summer Hits Only 2012	17,012	
31	5 August	Compilation	Zumba Fitness Dance Party 2012	18,930	
32	12 August	Compilation	NRJ Extravadance 2012 Vol. 2	14,009	
33	19 August	Compilation	Zumba Fitness Dance Party 2012	14,411	
34	26 August	Compilation	Zumba Fitness Dance Party 2012	15,757	
35	2 September	Tryo	Ladilafé	22,247	
36	9 September	C2C	Tetra	20,894	
37	16 September	Marc Lavoine	Je descends du singe	24,000	
38	23 September	Mika	The Origin of Love	25,702	
39	30 September	Baptiste Giabiconi	Oxygen	21,149	
40	7 October	Muse	The 2nd Law	89,873	
41	14 October	Muse	The 2nd Law	28,334	
42	21 October	Muse	The 2nd Law	19,227	
43	28 October	Francis Cabrel	Vise le ciel	36,053	
44	4 November	Francis Cabrel	Vise le ciel	17,603	
45	11 November	Celine Dion	Sans attendre	95,569	
46	18 November	Johnny Hallyday	L'attente	120,488	
47	25 November	Various artists	Génération Goldman	70,913	
48	2 December	Patrick Bruel	Lequel de nous	59,619	
49	9 December	Mylène Farmer	Monkey Me	147,512	
50	16 December	Various artists	Génération Goldman	91,376	
51	23 December	Celine Dion	Sans attendre	140,718	
52	30 December	Various artists	NRJ Music Awards 2013	84,530	

== See also ==
- 2012 in music
- List of number-one hits (France)
- List of top 10 singles in 2012 (France)
