= L'autre (video) =

Video by Mylène Farmer
- Released: September 1992
- Recorded: 1991–1992
- Genre: Compilation
- Label: Polydor

Mylène Farmer chronology
The Videos (1990)	L'autre (1992)	Music Videos I (1997)

L'autre is a VHS recorded by the French singer Mylène Farmer, containing all the singer's videoclips from 1991 to 1992. It was released in September 1992 in France.

This VHS includes all the videos from the third studio album L'autre... This fourth music video was not entitled Les Clips Vol. IV, but was named L'autre... since the videoclips available on this VHS are these of the fourth singles from this album.

This VHS content is also included on the DVD Music Videos I.

== Formats ==
This video was released on VHS and Laserdisc.

== Track listings ==
No	Video	From album	Year	Length
1	"Désenchantée"	L'autre...	1991	10:12
2	"Regrets"	L'autre...	1991	6:17
3	"Je t'aime mélancolie"	L'autre...	1991	5:13
4	"Beyond My Control"	L'autre...	1992	5:00

+ Backstage of the videos "Désenchantée" (14:23).

== Credits and personnel ==
- Videos directed by Laurent Boutonnat
- Backstage filmed by François Hanss

== Certifications and sales ==
Country	Certification	Sales/shipments
France	Platinum	50,000+
