= List of top 10 singles in 2012 (France) =

This is a list of singles that have peaked in the top 10 of the French Singles Chart in 2012.

== Top 10 singles ==
Entry date	Artist(s)	Single	Peak	Peak date	Weeks in Top 10
Singles from 2011
14 August	David Guetta featuring Sia	"Titanium"	3	8 January	13
13 November	Mylène Farmer	"Du temps"	4	22 January	2
11 December	Collectif Paris-Africa	"Des ricochets"	5	8 January	10
Singles from 2012
8 January	Foster the People	"Pumped Up Kicks"	10	8 January	2
8 January	Lana Del Rey	"Video Games"	2	4 March	16
15 January	Taio Cruz featuring Flo Rida	"Hangover"	8	15 January	1
15 January	Snoop Dogg and Wiz Khalifa featuring Bruno Mars	"Young, Wild & Free"	6	15 January	3
15 January	Michel Teló	"Ai Se Eu Te Pego"	1	22 January	17
22 January	Sexion d'Assaut	"Avant qu'elle parte"	3	22 January	16
29 January	Pitbull featuring Chris Brown	"International Love"	6	12 February	7
5 February	Madonna featuring Nicki Minaj and M.I.A.	"Give Me All Your Luvin'"	3	12 February	4
5 February	Irma	"I Know"	2	26 February	9
19 February	Kavinsky	"Nightcall"	10	19 February	2
19 February	Whitney Houston	"I Will Always Love You"	2	19 February	1
26 February	David Guetta featuring Nicki Minaj	"Turn Me On"	10	26 February	2
26 February	Gotye featuring Kimbra	"Somebody That I Used to Know" ^{[F]}^{[H]}	1	1 April	23
4 March	Lykke Li	"I Follow Rivers" ^{[D]}	4	1 April	11
11 March	Tal	"Le sens de la vie"	4	25 March	9
18 March	Les Enfoirés	"Encore un autre hiver"	10	18 March	1
25 March	Nicki Minaj	"Starships"	5	1 April	10
25 March	Sexion d'Assaut	"Ma direction" ^{[C]}	5	27 May	11
1 April	Shaka Ponk	"My Name Is Stain"	7	8 April	4
15 April	Orelsan	"La terre est ronde"	9	15 April	3
15 April	Rihanna	"Where Have You Been"	2	6 May	9
29 April	DJ Antoine	"Ma Chérie 2k12"	7	13 May	4
29 April	Carly Rae Jepsen	"Call Me Maybe"	1	17 June	26
6 May	Gusttavo Lima	"Balada"	1	3 June	13
13 May	Matt Houston featuring P-Square	"Positif"	5	3 June	8
13 May	Birdy	"Skinny Love"	2	10 June	18
13 May	Tacabro	"Tacata'"	1	24 June	16
13 May	Flo Rida	"Whistle" ^{[E]}	2	1 July	10
3 June	Pitbull	"Back in Time"	3	22 July	13
17 June	Sexion d'Assaut	"Wati House" ^{[G]}	4	19 August	5
24 June	Jose de Rico featuring Henry Mendez	"Rayos de sol"	4	12 August	8
1 July	Shy'm	"Et alors !"	2	15 July	7
15 July	Fun featuring Janelle Monáe	"We Are Young" ^{[J]}	7	28 October	5
29 July	will.i.am featuring Eva Simons	"This Is Love"	2	5 August	9
5 August	Maroon 5 featuring Wiz Khalifa	"Payphone"	8	5 August	1
5 August	R.I.O. featuring Nicco	"Party Shaker"	5	19 August	5
5 August	Alex Ferrari	"Bara Bará Bere Berê"	1	19 August	9
19 August	DJ Mam's featuring Jessy Matador and Luis Guisao	"Zumba He Zumba Ha"	7	19 August	5
26 August	David Guetta featuring Sia	"She Wolf (Falling to Pieces)"	4	16 September	14
2 September	Kid Cudi featuring MGMT and Ratatat	"Pursuit of Happiness"	2	16 September	8
2 September	Owl City and Carly Rae Jepsen	"Good Time" ^{[I]}	4	23 September	6
9 September	M83	"Midnight City"	8	9 September	2
9 September	Khaled	"C'est la vie"	4	9 September	3
9 September	C2C	"Down the Road"	1	23 September	11
23 September	Booba	"Caramel"	10	23 September	1
30 September	Rihanna	"Diamonds"	1	30 September	21
30 September	Psy	"Gangnam Style"	1	21 October	23
30 September	BB Brunes	"Coups et blessures" ^{[K]}	7	4 November	3
7 October	Alex Clare	"Too Close"	9	14 October	3
7 October	Adele	"Skyfall"	1	4 November	24
28 October	Flo Rida	"I Cry"	9	28 October	2
28 October	Mylène Farmer	"À l'ombre" ^{[L]}	1	2 December	2
4 November	Maroon 5	"One More Night"	9	4 November	2
11 November	Celine Dion	"Parler à mon père"	8	11 November	1
11 November	Axel Tony and Tunisiano	"Avec toi"	7	11 November	2
11 November	Alicia Keys	"Girl on Fire"	5	18 November	9
18 November	Emeli Sandé	"Read All About It (Part III)" ^{[M]}	7	18 November	11
18 November	M. Pokora and Tal	"Envole-moi"	5	25 November	7
2 December	Pulcino Pio	"Le poussin piou"	9	2 December	3

== 2011 peaks ==
Entry date	Artist(s)	Single	Peak	Peak date	Weeks in Top 10
18 September	Adele	"Someone like You" ^{[A]}	1	16 October	24
25 September	Flo Rida	"Good Feeling"	3	6 November	16
25 September	Adele	"Set Fire to the Rain"	9	25 September	3
2 October	Rihanna featuring Calvin Harris	"We Found Love"	1	2 October	15
16 October	LMFAO	"Sexy and I Know It"	3	1 January	17
6 November	Sean Paul	"She Doesn't Mind"	3	4 December	10
11 December	Shakira	"Je l'aime à mourir" ^{[B]}	1	11 December	17

== 2013 peaks ==
Entry date	Artist(s)	Single	Peak	Peak date	Weeks in Top 10
23 September	Asaf Avidan	"One Day / Reckoning Song"	2	3 February	24
25 November	will.i.am featuring Britney Spears	"Scream & Shout"	1	20 January	16
25 November	Bruno Mars	"Locked Out of Heaven"	3	24 February	24
16 December	Birdy	"People Help the People"	7	6 January	6

== See also ==
- 2012 in music
- List of number-one hits of 2012 (France)

== Notes ==
- ^{A} - The single re-entered the Top 10 on the week ending 19 February 2012.
- ^{B} - The single re-entered the Top 10 on the week ending 8 April 2012.
- ^{C} - The single re-entered the Top 10 on the week ending 20 May 2012.
- ^{D} - The single re-entered the Top 10 on the week ending 27 May 2012.
- ^{E} - The single re-entered the Top 10 on the week ending 3 June 2012.
- ^{F} - The single re-entered the Top 10 on the week ending 8 July 2012.
- ^{G} - The single re-entered the Top 10 on the week ending 12 August 2012.
- ^{H} - The single re-entered the Top 10 on the week ending 19 August 2012.
- ^{I} - The single re-entered the Top 10 on the week ending 16 September 2012.
- ^{J} - The single re-entered the Top 10 on the week ending 21 October 2012.
- ^{K} - The single re-entered the Top 10 on the week ending 28 October 2012.
- ^{L} - The single re-entered the Top 10 on the week ending 2 December 2012.
- ^{M} - The single re-entered the Top 10 on the week ending 9 December 2012.
