= Give Me All Your Luvin' =

2012 single by Madonna

Single by Madonna featuring Nicki Minaj and M.I.A.

from the album MDNA
- Released: February 3, 2012
- Recorded: 2011
- Studio: Sarm West (London); MSR Studios (New York City)
- Genre: Bubblegum pop; dance-pop
- Length: 3:22
- Label: Interscope
- Songwriters: Madonna; Martin Solveig; Onika Maraj; Mathangi Arulpragasam; Michael Andre Tordjman
- Producers: Madonna; Solveig

Madonna singles chronology
| "Revolver" (2009) | "Give Me All Your Luvin'" (2012) | "Girl Gone Wild" (2012) |

Nicki Minaj singles chronology
| "Turn Me On" (2011) | "Give Me All Your Luvin'" (2012) | "Starships" (2012) |

M.I.A. singles chronology
| "Bad Girls" (2012) | "Give Me All Your Luvin'" (2012) | "Bring the Noize" (2013) |

Music video
- "Give Me All Your Luvin'" on YouTube

"Give Me All Your Luvin'" is a song by the American singer Madonna from her twelfth album, MDNA (2012). It features guest vocals by the American rapper Nicki Minaj and the English rapper M.I.A. The song was written and produced by Madonna and Martin Solveig, with additional writing by M.I.A., Minaj and Michael Tordjman. After working with Solveig on one song, Madonna continued recording others including "Give Me All Your Luvin'". Madonna chose to work with M.I.A. and Minaj on the track since she felt they were both strong women with unique voices. She also liked their music and what they represented.

A demo version of the song, titled "Give Me All Your Love", was leaked on November 8, 2011, resulting in a man from Spain being arrested for copyright violations. The final version of the song was released on February 3, 2012, as the lead single from MDNA. The track was her debut single from her three-album deal with Interscope Records. Backed by bouncing synthesizers, marching drums and a cheer, "Give Me All Your Luvin'" is a bubblegum pop and dance-pop song, with elements of new wave and disco. Madonna executes the chorus in high-pitched vocals while during its dubstep breakdown, Minaj raps her verse as her alter-ego Roman Zolanski, followed by M.I.A. rapping her verse.

"Give Me All Your Luvin'" received mixed reviews from music critics. Its chorus was noted as a highlight by critics, who described it as catchy; however, they felt that the musical composition was inferior to Madonna's previous singles. Commercially, the song attained success, topping the charts in Canada, Finland, Hungary, and Israel while peaking within the top ten in several European countries. In the United States, it became Madonna's 38th top ten hit on the Billboard Hot 100 chart, extending her record as the artist with the most top-ten singles in the chart's history at the time.

The song's accompanying music video featuring both Minaj and M.I.A. was directed by Megaforce. It shows Madonna, Minaj, and M.I.A. along with cheerleaders wearing animegao masks and football players. Madonna first performed the song with Minaj and M.I.A. at the Super Bowl XLVI halftime show. During the performance, M.I.A. extended her middle finger towards the camera while rapping her verse. She was criticized in the media and broadcaster NBC and the National Football League (NFL) issued apologies. They also fined the rapper which was resolved through a confidential agreement. Later that year, Madonna also performed "Give Me All Your Luvin'" on the MDNA Tour, where she wore a majorette outfit.

== Background and writing ==
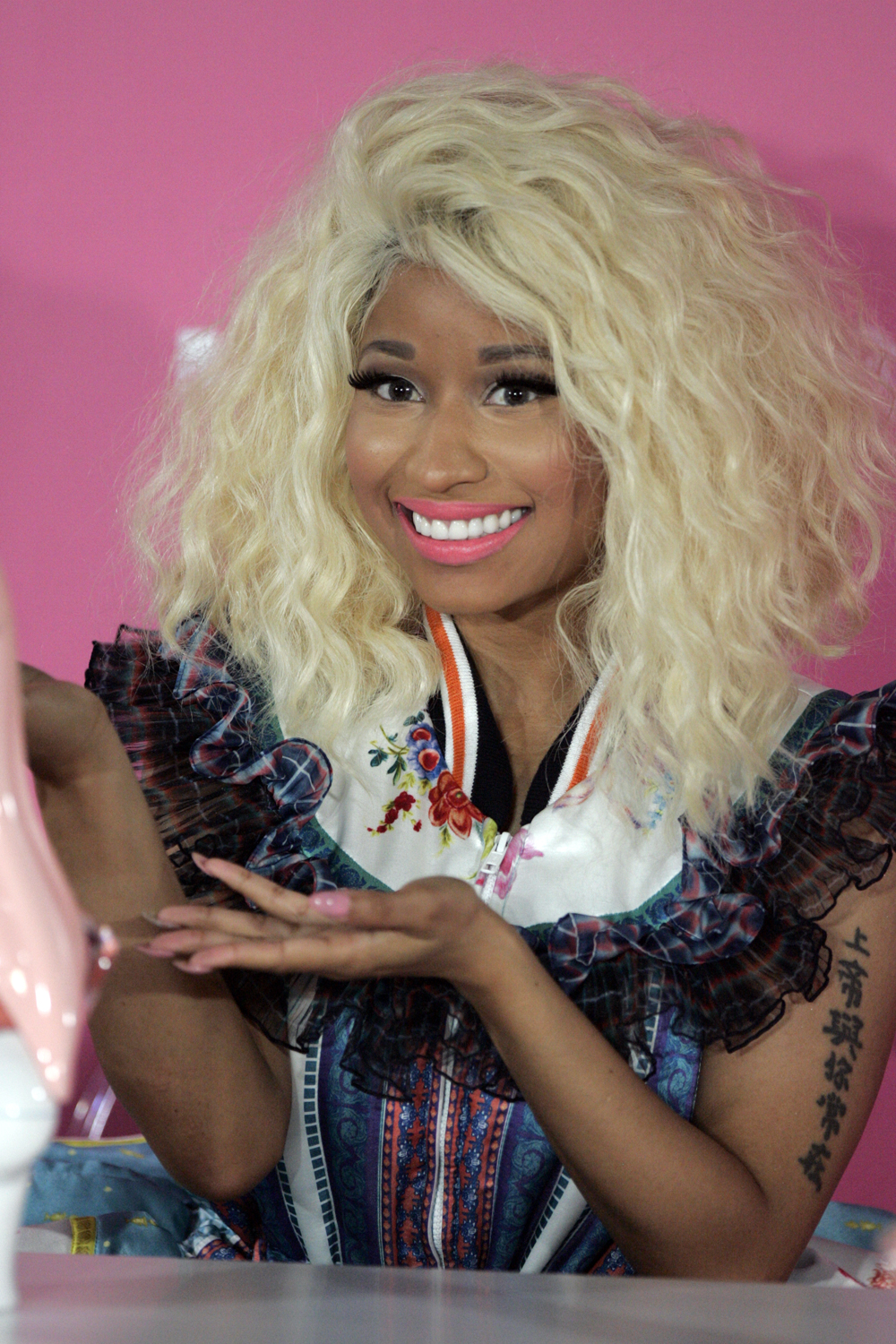
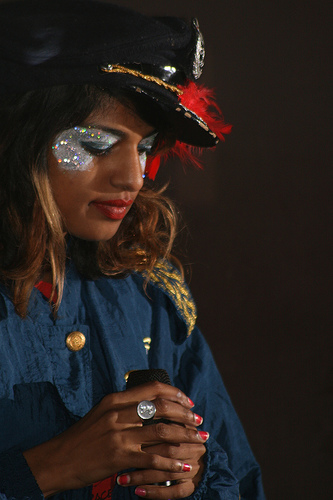
In "Give Me All Your Luvin'", Madonna collaborated with rappers Nicki Minaj (left) and M.I.A. (right).

In December 2010, Madonna posted a message on her Facebook, exclaiming: "Its official! I need to move. I need to sweat. I need to make new music! Music I can dance to. I'm on the lookout for the maddest, sickest, most badass people to collaborate with. I'm just saying". One of the collaborators was French DJ and producer Martin Solveig, who was invited to a writing session by Madonna in London in July 2011. Originally, Madonna wanted to work with Solveig on one song, but eventually it turned into three tracks—"Give Me All Your Luvin'", "I Don't Give A", and "Turn Up the Radio". In an interview with Billboard, Solveig explained that Madonna had enough time for the project, hence after working on one song, they continued recording. Solveig described the sessions as fun and labeled them a "privileged time".

"Give Me All Your Luvin'" was written by Madonna, Martin Solveig, Nicki Minaj, M.I.A., and Michael Tordjman, while production was helmed by Madonna and Solveig. Madonna had wanted to work with M.I.A. and Minaj on a song, since she felt that they are both "strong women with a unique voice". She paid tribute to the stars, saying "[Minaj and M.I.A. are] not conventional pop stars and I really admire them both". M.I.A. confirmed the collaboration on her Twitter account, saying that she had been asked to come to New York City on November 29, 2011. The rapper felt that the collaboration was an achievement her mother would be proud of, "way [more] than me putting 'Galang' out in a club."

== Release and leaks ==
On November 8, 2011, a demo version of the song, named "Give Me All Your Love", was leaked. According to Keith Caulfield from Billboard, "Within a few hours, [the song and its leak] was one of the top 10 trending topics worldwide on Twitter." Madonna's manager, Guy Oseary, addressed the leak on Twitter adding the singer's statement on the situation: "My true fans wouldn't do this". Oseary also clarified that their initial plan was for new music to come out in 2012 itself. He was happy with the positive reaction to the demo, but asked fans to help him police any more leaks. The leaked demo lacked vocals from both Minaj and M.I.A. which Madonna reflected upon, "It's really disappointing because you don't want things to come out till you're done with them, till you're ready. It's like everybody looking at your unfinished painting. It's like, 'Wait a minute. I didn't finish that. That's not fair."

On December 22, 2011, the police arrested a 31-year-old man from Spain who had reportedly leaked the demo. They confirmed the suspect's initials as J.M.R. and described him as "a big Madonna fan"; they found recordings of the song in his belongings. He was arrested in Zaragoza, charged and subsequently released, pending a trial. It was confirmed by WENN in The Huffington Post that the person did not seek to achieve a profit from the release. In 2014, several demos from Madonna's thirteenth studio album Rebel Heart leaked and an Israeli hacker named Adi Lederman was arrested: the indictment papers said that Lederman was also responsible for the leak of "Give Me All Your Luvin'".

A month later, Interscope Records announced that the song would be released on February 3, 2012, three days before she was to perform at the Super Bowl XLVI halftime show. The track was her debut single from her three-album deal with Interscope Records. Along with the announcement Madonna revealed the cover art for the single. It depicted three black-and-white images of the singer side-by-side, making faces and posing, while wearing a t-shirt emblazoned with the song title. "Give Me All Your Luvin'" was sent to United States Mainstream radio on February 7, 2012. Madonna partnered with Clear Channel media to launch radio support for the track, and from February 3 it was played across 95 Mainstream and Rhythmic radio stations owned by them. The single was also played in the United Kingdom through Clear Channel's partnership with UK's Capital radio networks. They played the track at the top of every hour throughout the day until February 5, along with a megamix of songs from MDNA. The single was also released for streaming on iHeartRadio websites with online contests and promotional drives for buying it from iTunes.

== Recording and composition ==
"Give Me All Your Luvin'" was recorded at MSR Studios, New York City and Sarm West Studios, Notting Hill, London. Demacio "Demo" Castellon recorded and mixed the track. Philippe Weiss and Graham Archer assisted Castellon on the recording, while Angie Teo assisted on the mixing. Jason "Metal" Donkersgoed did the additional editing of the song and Jean Baptiste Gaudray played guitars. Alongside his producing duty, Solveig also arranged the synths and drums for the track. He recalled that the track was recorded in two days, with Madonna and him continuously discussing the chord progression and the music. The initial version of the song's breakdown was "too much" of dubstep, which Madonna asked him to change, while adding Minaj and M.I.A.'s rapping over them.

"Give Me All Your Luvin'"
A 20-second sample of "Give Me All Your Luvin'" which illustrates the high-pitched vocals employed by Madonna while singing the chorus, which is backed by Nicki Minaj and M.I.A. with the cheerleading chant "L-U-V Madonna, Y-O-U You wanna."

"Give Me All Your Luvin'" is a bubblegum pop and dance-pop song, with elements of new wave and disco. The song starts with a cheer: "L-U-V Madonna, Y-O-U you wanna" with the vocal tone reminiscent off Gwen Stefani's single "Hollaback Girl" (2005) and "Mickey" (1982) by Toni Basil. A "polished 60s shakedown" succeeds the chant, which is backed by bouncing synthesizers and hard drums. Priya Elan of NME said that the composition resembled Madonna's own songs like "Beautiful Stranger" (1999), "Amazing" (2000) and the songs on her studio albums, Ray of Light (1998) and Hard Candy (2008).

The chorus of the song follows, which Madonna performs in a high-pitched voice: "Don't play the stupid game / Cause I’m a different kind of girl / Every record sounds the same / You’ve got to step into my world / Give me all your luvin', give me your love / Give me all your love today." Entertainment Weekly's Lanford Beard observed that the song "blends Katy Perry-meets-Gwen Stefani chanting, echoes of Ashlee Simpson's regrettable foray into New Wave-y synth-guitar sounds, and a 'Hold It Against Me' redux breakdown." John Mitchell of MTV News commented that the instrumentation of the song consists of "glittery synths, marching band drums, claps and a catchy-as-hell chorus." Lewis Corner of Digital Spy called the song an "'80s-inspired electro-thumper complete with a cheerleader chant of 'L-U-V Madonna!'" "Give Me All Your Luvin'" is written in the key of D♭ major and has a moderately fast tempo of 144 beats per minute. It follows a basic chord progression of D♭–G♭–A♭ in the verses, and D♭–F♭–C♭–G♭ in the chorus and intermediate bridge. Madonna's vocals span from the tonal nodes of C♭_{4} to A♭_{4}.

After the leak of the song in November 2011, media reported on the similarities between the song and singer Nicola Roberts' "Beat of My Drum", due to the "cheerleader-style" verses in both. "Give Me All Your Luvin'" has the lyrics "L-U-V Madonna" while Roberts track features the lyrics "L.O.V.E/ Dance to the beat of my drum". Soon after, Roberts called Madonna a "copycat" for the alleged similarities between the songs. However, she later insisted that people had been "quick to jump the gun" and claimed she had not even heard the song. Brazilian music producer Joao Brasil alleged that the chorus of "Give Me All Your Luvin'" was plagiarized from his 2011 single "L.O.V.E Banana". Both songs start with the shouts of cheerleaders, who in Brazil's song say "L.O.V.E Banana" and in Madonna's song, "L.U.V. Madonna".

== Critical reception ==
"Give Me All Your Luvin'" was met with generally mixed reviews from music critics. Priya Elan from NME said the song "seems to soar effortlessly" and that "what Madonna's doing in this song is so much more impossibly fun than we could have imagined." She also stated the song was a progress from the sound of her previous album, Hard Candy. Jim Farber from the New York Daily News considered that the song is "a pure snap of bubble gum, closer to an early single like 'Burning Up' than any of her more recent club hits. Only the rap cameos from the quite camp Nicki Minaj, and the less so M.I.A., tell us what decade we're in." Michael Cragg from The Guardian felt that the track was not bad. "Musically it's a pretty joyful four minutes, featuring bouncing beats, acoustic riffs and Gwen Stefani-style cheerleader chants, but there's something a bit flat about Madonna's delivery. Given all the love she's demanding, you'd think she'd be more excited." Speaking of the rap part, he thought that "Minaj certainly does her best, her typically frantic rap an exercise in squeezing as many words into a 10-second space as possible, while MIA's more laconic drawl loses momentum." Chris Willman of Reuters called it "risible" and infectious: "Everything here is as dumb as the titular spelling, but the campiness has its charm, at least if you like the old musicals that some of the tracking shots here are paying homage to". MTV News journalist Bradley Stern wrote about the "Hey Mickey" comparisons, complimenting the guest rapping of Minaj and M.I.A. even though he felt it was "one of the album’s least compelling moments". In a review of MDNA, Neil McCormick of The Daily Telegraph felt that the prime purpose of the "lightest, frothiest track" from the album was to represent next generation's female pop stars. Emily Mackay of The Quietus wrote in detail about the song:

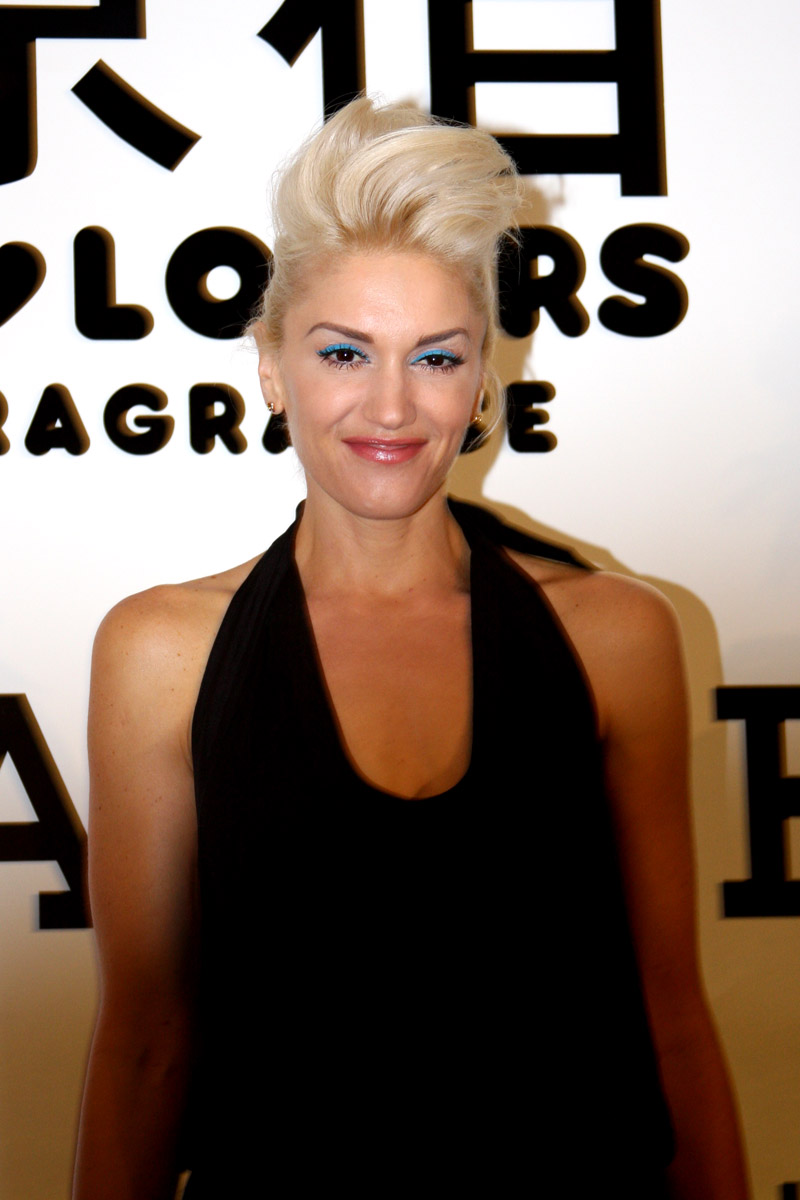
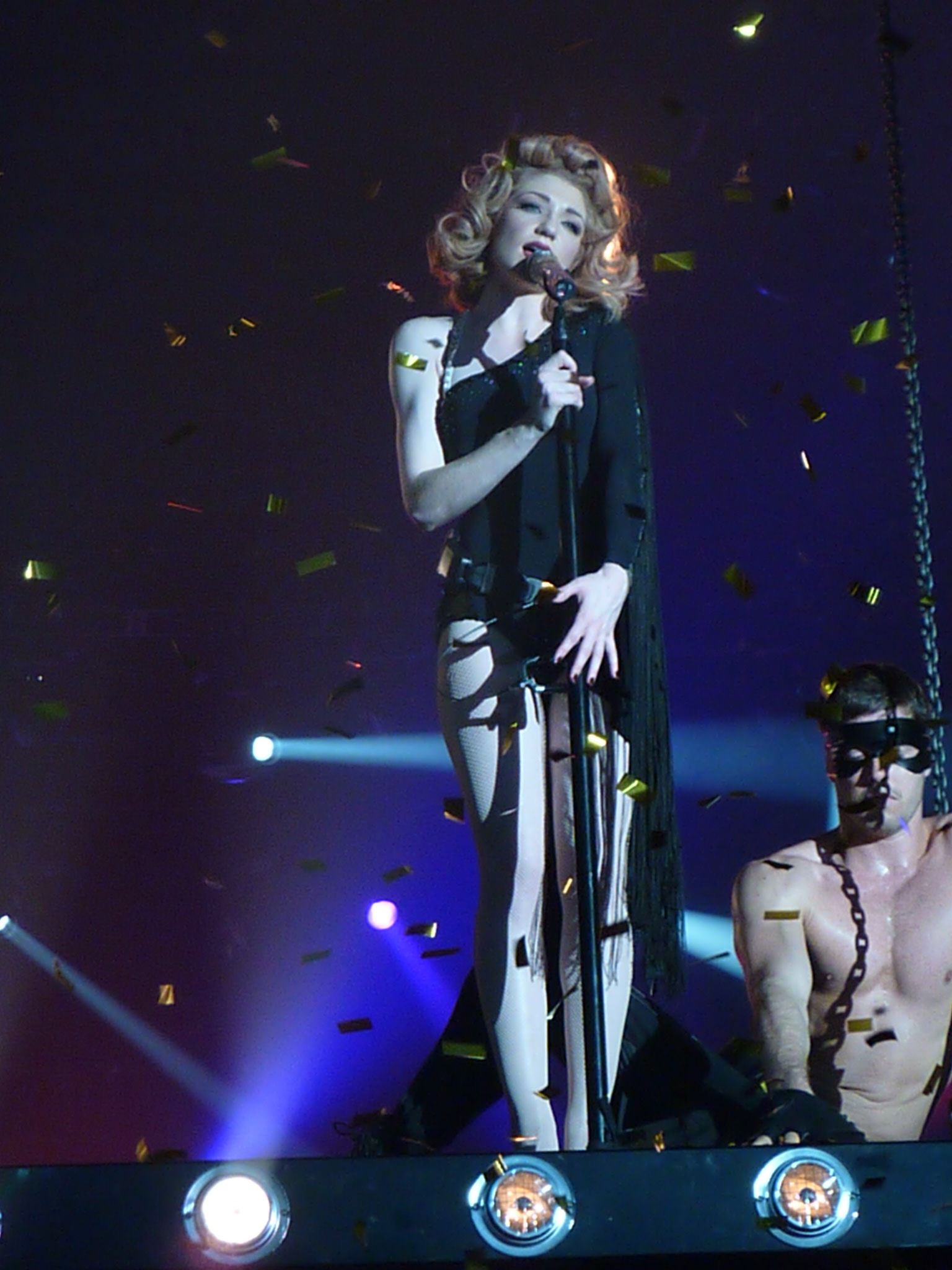
"Give Me All Your Luvin'" was compared to songs by Gwen Stefani (left) and Nicola Roberts (right).

After the first play of this album, I sat down and had a hard think about which of those songs I'd want to play again first. The only one that stuck in the head most was 'Give Me All Your Luvin'', whose cheerleader chants and thrumming rhythm are kind of excruciating, but at least catchy. Minaj and M.I.A. are as effortlessly awesome as they can both be when limited to just a few lines. Say what you like about Maya, but she sounds a deal more plausible that Madonna herself on a line like 'Imma say this once, hey I don't give a shit'... Oddly, for a single so tame, Madonna seems to see it as a challenge 'Every record sounds the same, you've got to step into my world'? We're already in your bloody world! It was kind of your responsibility to step out of it and make a record that didn't sound the same, so don't bloody badger us about it.

Andrew Hampp from Billboard negatively reviewed the signing of Minaj and M.I.A. as guest artists, adding that "It's a subpar effort from all parties, particularly Madonna, who hasn't sounded this robotic since the more tweaked-out moments on Hard Candy." In another review, Keith Caulfield from the same magazine deemed the track as a commercial for Madonna's Super Bowl appearance, rather than being a promotional tool for MDNA, criticizing it for misleading the listener about the vibe of the album. Gareth Grundy from The Guardian shared this view, while describing the track as "clumsy rave-pop". Jody Rosen of Rolling Stone rated it two out of five stars, describing its lyrics and composition as "dashed off" and "in the doldrums", and was displeased by the track's "aggressive, assaultive spunkiness". Sal Cinquemani from Slant Magazine described the song as "decidedly vapid" and "catchy" but also stated that "its few charms—'60s surf-pop guitar, vintage video-game effects, and references to her past songs—are fleeting at best." He felt that Minaj and M.I.A. were "tacked on for added marketability" and that the song actually lacked "authenticity". While reviewing MDNA, The New York Times' critic Jon Pareles described the song as "one of the album's weakest tracks". Joey Guerra from the Houston Chronicle wrote that the song's "shiny-happy" sound is "nowhere near representative of the full album."

Alexis Petridis from The Guardian listed the song as the weakest effort on MDNA, adding that "its position as the album's lead single seems to have had more to do with showing off the presence of Nicki Minaj and M.I.A. than its featherweight melody." A writer for Virgin Media gave the song three out of five stars, writing: "Like most Madonna singles, it skips along at a furious pace with a gleam in its eye, but the self-references get tiresome and ultimately she is just trying too hard." Nick Levine, writing for The National, relegated the track as a "lighter pop morsel". Matthew Parpetua from Pitchfork panned the song, saying that Solveig's production on the track was paired with equally "bland lyrics". Brad O'Mancey from Popjustice declared that the track was "proof that sometimes you can listen to something many, many times and still not have any idea whether it's any good or not." Chicago Tribune journalist Greg Kot was disappointed with the song and its lyrics, which he found to be meaningless, while Bernard Zuel of The Sydney Morning Herald relegated it as "trite and disposable". Alex Macpherson from Fact found the song to be "sheer misconceived awfulness". Jude Rogers from The Guardian criticized its "unforgivable spelling" and pointed out that the "candy-pop chorus really fizzes, but [Minaj and M.I.A.’s] cheerleading whoops and raps quickly dissolve". She placed the song at number 66 on her ranking of Madonna's singles, in honor of her 60th birthday. In August 2018, Billboard picked it as the singer's 95th greatest single; "[Madonna's] undeniably the squad captain on this surf-rock-inspired workout, but her collaborators deserve a big thank Y-O-U for providing the catchiest part of the song with their cheerleader chants".

== Chart performance ==
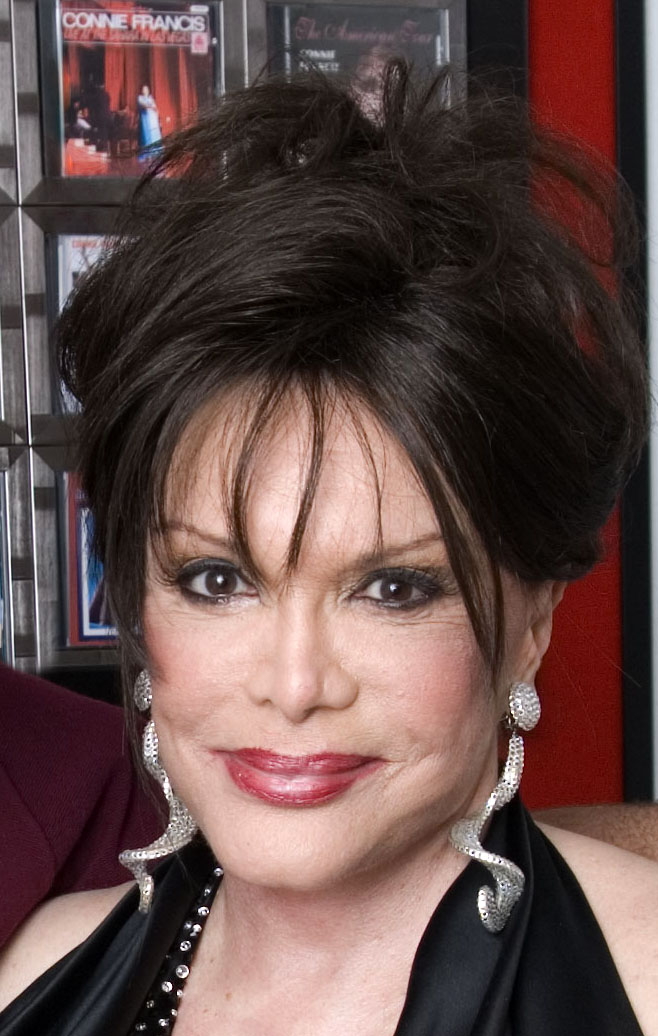
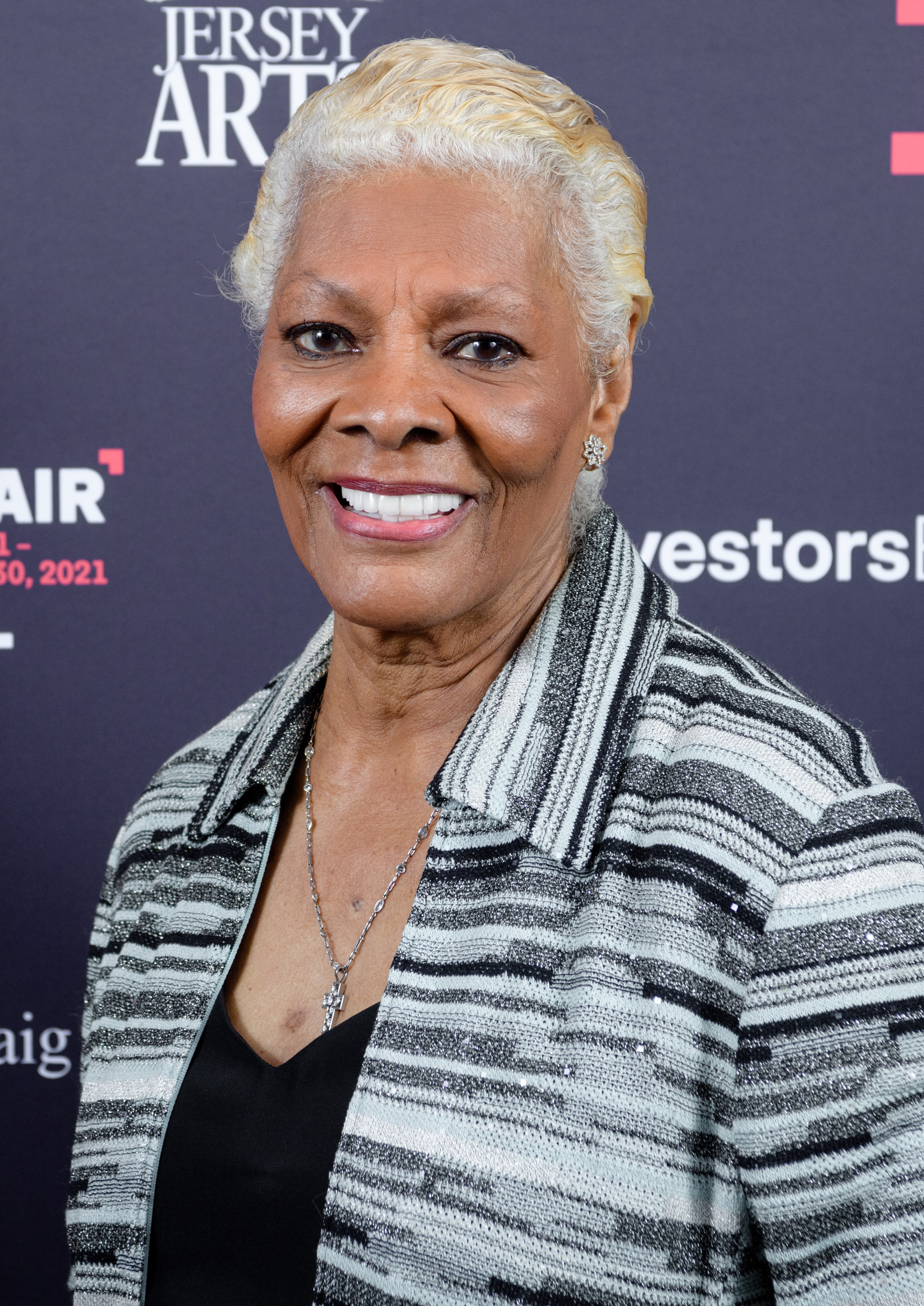
"Give Me All Your Luvin'" was Madonna's 53rd entry on the Billboard Hot 100, a feat that tied her with Connie Francis (left) and Dionne Warwick (right) as the female artist with the second most entries.

In the United States, "Give Me All Your Luvin'" was played from 9 am on February 3, 2012 by Clear Channel radio stations. It debuted at number 24 on the Billboard Mainstream Top 40 chart, with weekly accumulation of 2,766 plays (Clear Channel accumulated for 79% of those plays). It was Madonna's seventh top-25 debut on the chart, the most since its inception in 1992. Along with the debut on Mainstream Top 40, "Give Me All Your Luvin'" also debuted at number 33 on the Rhythmic airplay, number 35 on Adult Top 40 and number 20 on Dance/Mix Show Airplay chart. "Give Me All Your Luvin'" debuted at number seven on the Hot Digital Songs chart selling 115,000 copies, the amount sold in the first three days of its availability and end of Billboard's tracking week. It consequently debuted at number 13 on the Billboard Hot 100 with 44 million total radio airplay. Following the performance at the Super Bowl XLVI halftime show, digital downloads for the song increased by 44% the next week to 165,000 copies, and the song reached number 10 on the Hot 100. It became Madonna's first top-ten single since "4 Minutes" (2008) and was her 38th song to reach the top-ten, thereby extending her record as the artist with the most top-ten songs on the Hot 100. The record would remain until Drake's "Greece" and "Popstar", with DJ Khaled, broke the record in 2020, becoming his 39th and 40th Hot 100 top ten entries. The song plummeted to number 39 the next week as the promotional effects of the Super Bowl wore off. With the release of "Give Me All Your Luvin'", Madonna tied with Dionne Warwick and Connie Francis for amassing the second highest number (53) of Billboard Hot 100 entries by female artists, only behind Aretha Franklin who had 73 entries. Madonna also extended her record as the artist with the most number-one songs on the Dance Club Songs chart, when "Give Me All Your Luvin'" became her 41st song to top it. In June 2012, the song was certified gold by the Recording Industry Association of America (RIAA), for sales of more than 500,000 copies.

In Canada, the song debuted at number 11 on the Canadian Hot 100 for issue date of February 10, 2012. The next week, the song jumped to number one, becoming both greatest digital and airplay gainer of the week. The song also reached number one on the Digital Songs chart, with a 76% download increase to 24,000 copies, and number 10 on the Hot 100 Airplay chart with a 143% audience increase to over 14 million. It became Madonna's 24th number-one hit in Canada and her second chart-topper in the Hot 100 era after "4 Minutes". In Japan, the song debuted at number 42 on the Japan Hot 100, and moved to a peak of number three after two weeks. "Give Me All Your Luvin'" had low chart placement in Australia, where the song debuted at its peak of number 25 for the issue dated February 19, 2012, before falling out of the chart from number 44 the next week. Similarly, in New Zealand, the song debuted and peaked at number 26 for only one week.

In the United Kingdom, the song peaked at number 37 on the UK Singles Chart with sales of 8,577 copies, becoming Madonna's 67th entry on the chart. The low sales were due to two days worth of download sales being discounted by the Official Charts Company as a result of a promotional offer that allowed the song to be downloaded for free if pre-ordering the album MDNA. It resulted in her worst performance for a lead single since "Everybody" (1982). The song dropped down to number 51 the next week, selling a further 7,070 copies but climbed to a peak of number 12 on the UK Airplay Chart. With the release of the CD single, "Give Me All Your Luvin'" sold a further 1,460 copies reaching number two on the UK Physical Singles chart. "Give Me All Your Luvin'" debuted atop the charts in Finland, but it quickly dropped off within three weeks. In Italy, the song peaked at number two and was certified platinum by the Federation of the Italian Music Industry (FIMI) for shipment of 30,000 copies of the single. "Give Me All Your Luvin'" debuted at number four on the French Singles Chart and jumped to its peak of number three the next week. It was present on the chart for 21 weeks, becoming Madonna's twenty-second top ten, Minaj's third top ten and MIA's first. The song peaked within the top ten in Belgium, Germany, Netherlands, Spain and Switzerland, reaching a peak of number seven on Billboard's Euro Digital Songs chart.

== Music video ==
=== Background ===
On December 8, 2011, Minaj tweeted that she was on set with Madonna filming the music video for "Give Me All Your Luvin". She also said that Madonna kissed her on the lips, as a gift for her birthday. M.I.A. then tweeted about filming the video with Madonna, saying, "Madonna killed it! A legend! said she'd have me, I said ill have her too". Directed by the team Megaforce—which consists of Léo Berne, Charles Brisgand, Raphaël Rodriguez and Clément Gallet—the video has a football and cheerleader theme, inspired by her then-upcoming Super Bowl halftime performance. Rodriguez explained to MTV News that they discussed the song with Solveig and understood that the video should be "about happiness and something really sunny". The whole look was also dictated by the fact that Megaforce had never collaborated with Madonna, Minaj and M.I.A., feeling that it was a "different universe" for them. The video was shot for over two days in New York, with very strict timings which Megaforce found as challenging. Describing the process as like working with the Central Intelligence Agency (CIA), Megaforce told Swiss newspaper 20 minutes that the set was surrounded by police patrol and security guards and mobile phones were not allowed. A total budget of US$1.5 million was allotted for the video. Some of the sequences in the video was Madonna's idea like one scene featuring her dancing in front of a wall, which Megaforce felt would not go with the main narrative. However, the singer insisted on keeping it and by the second day of filming she wrapped up early and left.

Retouching was applied during post-production where Minaj wanted her body to look like a plastic doll. Production for the music video was handled by US based company The Directors Bureau and UK based Riff Raff Films. Paris based visual effects, animation and motion design studio Mathematic was given the task of adding the graphics on the video. A team of 14 artists worked for two weeks in Paris to finish the task, accompanied by Megaforce. Different methods used included rotoscoping and keying for creating artificial fireworks and sparkling rain, 3D and 2D backgrounds, set-extensions, buildings, as well as the sky which they created using Autodesk Maya. Costumes worn in the video included Adidas uniforms for Minaj and M.I.A. and a retro inspired look for a sequence, wearing white lace dresses reminiscent of Madonna's look in her 20s, as well as Marilyn Monroe. Another ensemble for Madonna included a crop top, leopard printed bra and a huge cross across her neck. Dress designer for the video was Arianne Phillips with cloths provided by brands like Burberry, Dolce & Gabbana, Bebe, Norma Kamali and jewelry from Swarovski, vintage Yves Saint Laurent, Prada and Eddie Borgo.

=== Release and synopsis ===
A screenshot of the music video of "Give Me All Your Luvin'" which shows Minaj (left), Madonna (center) and M.I.A. (right) as the "triple Marilyn or triple Madonna" like figures. The costume was also compared to the singer's look for her "Like a Virgin" video.

Madonna had first previewed the video in an American Idol exclusive on February 2, 2012, and the full video premiered the next day on her YouTube channel. The video starts as the words "Fans can make you famous, a contract can make you rich, the press can make you a superstar, but only luv [sic] can make you a player" appear on a brick wall. Cheerleaders M.I.A. and Minaj then sing the opening lyrics in a suburban neighborhood alongside other cheerleaders wearing animegao masks. Madonna sings the first verse as she exits a house with a baby stroller and wears a trench coat and sunglasses, all of which are soon discarded. Emerging football players protect her from obstacles, golden raindrops and destroy a car that gets in her way. They hold her perpendicular to a wall and she walks horizontally. Throughout the video, Madonna can be seen dancing and singing in front of a brick wall, and in one scene she holds a baby doll.

During the second verse, Madonna walks across the city with M.I.A. and Minaj and is still followed by cheerleaders and football players. She walks down a city street, as players are shot down by an unseen shooter who opens fire from a passing vehicle. She climbs a pyramid of football players and is eventually taken to a club with Minaj and M.I.A., who sing their parts in a room filled with other cheerleaders and football players. Madonna then falls from the building but two players catch her. She makes her way to a town square, then starts dancing with her cheerleaders as they bash heads off of football players using baseball bats, revealing a climactic firework spectacle. Madonna grabs one of the heads and proudly displays it to a cheering audience. The video ends with Madonna in front of a brick wall, laughing and throwing away the baby doll, as the word "Touchdown!" appears in front of a pink backdrop.

=== Reception ===
Writing for Spin Caryn Ganz was pleased by the video, saying "[Madonna's] attempt to find a bridge between sports, love, and fame falls a bit flat... but in the end, the football players and cheerleaders in the video are all literally faceless passersby. They, like the two high-profile MCs, are all here in service of [the singer]." Christopher John Farley from The Washington Post gave another positive review, saying that the singer "appears to be in better shape than many college students, which is crazy" and also complimented her for picking "M.I.A. and Nicki Minaj–and getting them to literally serve as cheerleaders for the Madonna brand." MTV News' Jocelyn Vena described it as "funky, fun and surreal (and almost cartoony)" as well as fun and light-hearted: "Madonna looks like she's having an incredibly fun time throughout the visual, smiling and shimmying her way through this fictional, hyper-fantasy world. Watching the clip, one may wonder what doesn't happen in the video."

Nicole James from MTV News opined that the video gave another impression that although "Madonna's never been the cute and innocent homecoming queen, but those wholesome, all-American football players still wanna kick it with her." Cragg from The Guardian declared the video as a "hoot" with the "creepy cheerleaders and Madonna breastfeeding a doll". Bradley Stern from MuuMuse found similarities in the video with those of singer Björk's video for "It's Oh So Quiet" (1995) and Kylie Minogue's "Come into My World" (2002) with the "walk-talk and walk-crawl" formula in it. He added that the video is "self-aware, thoroughly modern, cheeky, sarcastic, glamorous and entirely camp all at the same time". Chris Wilman from TheWrap noted similarities to Madonna's own "Material Girl" (1985) video with the scenes showing her being carried off by the footballers, adding that "everything here is as dumb as the titular spelling, but the campiness has its charm, at least if you like the old musicals that some of the tracking shots here are paying homage to."

A writer from Rolling Stone gave a mixed review for the video saying that "It's a goofy and fun clip, though the faceless cheerleaders in the background are more creepy than amusing." In a pre-release screening of MDNA, Matthew Todd from Attitude believed that the last scene showing Madonna throwing off a baby doll implied that she was moving away from domestic life and embracing a party attitude. Amanda Dobbins from New York found some "attempted weirdness" in the video with the scenes of the triple Marilyns and the baby on Madonna's lap, but added that "Madonna still looks crazy bonkers good".

== Live performances ==
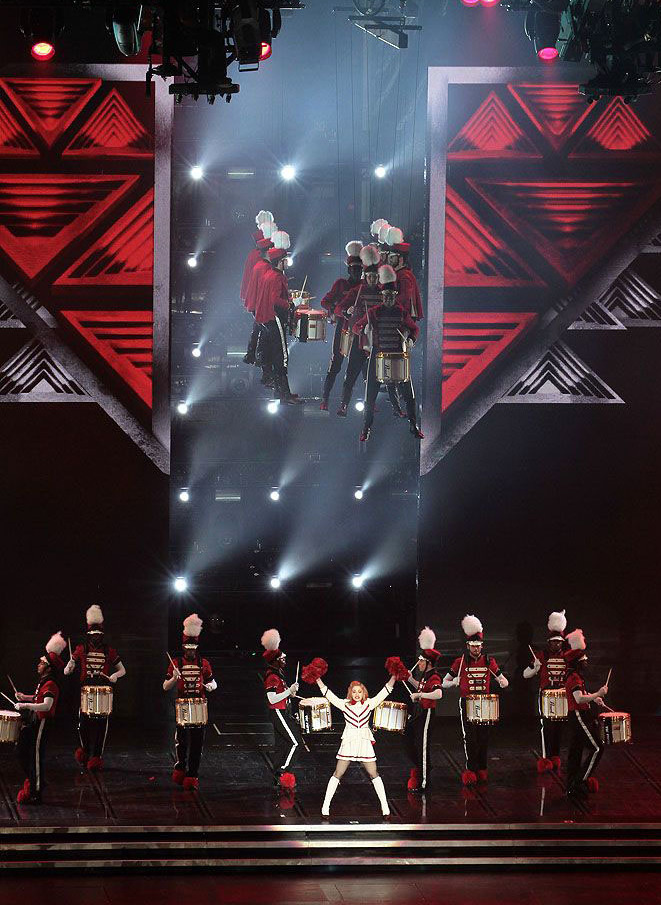
For the performance of "Give Me All Your Luvin'" on the MDNA Tour, Madonna was joined by a marching band while a drumline hung from mid-air.

In February 2012, Madonna performed "Give Me All Your Luvin'" with M.I.A. and Nicki Minaj at the Super Bowl XLVI halftime show at Lucas Oil Stadium in Indianapolis, Indiana. Madonna collaborated with Cirque du Soleil in producing the show. 36 image projectors were used to create a spectacle of lights. The whole performance consisted of 500 total outfits including customized looks for musical guests LMFAO, Minaj, M.I.A. and Green as well as costumes for 100 drum line performers, 150 gladiators—who wore pairs of black underwear designed by Calvin Klein—and 200 choir singers. As the performance of "Music" ended, a group of female dancers in majorette-like costumes joined Madonna onstage for performing "Give Me All Your Luvin'". Minaj and M.I.A. joined her onstage, both dressed in Egyptian inspired clothing. Together they danced as cheerleaders while holding pom-poms. During the intermediate section, all three of them stood on separate elevated platforms where Minaj and M.I.A. performed their respective verses.

The performance gained widespread attention from the media after M.I.A. extended her middle finger to the camera near the end of her verse instead of singing the word "shit". Media criticized M.I.A. for the gesture and compared the incident to Janet Jackson's 2004 wardrobe malfunction. People said, "Call it a finger malfunction? Madonna was supposed to be the center of attention during the Super Bowl halftime show Sunday, but the Queen of Pop was upstaged by her collaborator M.I.A., who flipped off the camera at one point during the performance, prompting swift apologies from the NFL and NBC." Madonna herself expressed her disappointment during an interview with host Ryan Seacrest on his talk show, On Air with Ryan Seacrest. She felt that it was a "teenager... irrelevant thing" for M.I.A. to do during the show since it was "out of place". Brian McCarthy, spokesman for the NFL said, "Our system was late to obscure the inappropriate gesture and we apologize to our viewers. The NFL hired the talent and produced the halftime show. There was a failure in NBC's delay system. The obscene gesture in the performance was completely inappropriate, very disappointing, and we apologize to our fans." McCarthy also clarified that the gesture was not revealed during rehearsals, M.I.A. improvised it on stage. The league later fined the rapper a total of $16.6 million as penalty, which was resolved through a confidential agreement in 2014.

Madonna also performed "Give Me All Your Luvin'" the same year on the MDNA Tour. After the performance of "Express Yourself" ended, she began performing "Give Me All Your Luvin'" dressed as a drum majorette in a white-and-red uniform with tall white boots. Phillips explained that the ensemble was created and inspired by a 1940s majorette look, and she added Swarovski crystals to the dress. Madonna sang the song on stage while a drumline was suspended in mid-air, and M.I.A. and Minaj appeared on the video screen. Caryn Ganz from Spin called the performance as the "night's most innovative moment" while Brian McManus from Rolling Stone was impressed with the drumline levitation on top of the stage. Niv Elis from The Jerusalem Post declared the performance as one of the show's "wow" moments. The November 19–20, 2012, performance of "Give Me All Your Luvin'" at Miami's American Airlines Arena, was recorded and released in Madonna's fourth live album, MDNA World Tour. Elements of the song were presented during the performance of "Bitch I'm Madonna" during the Celebration Tour of 2023–2024.

== Track listings and formats ==
- Digital download
1. "Give Me All Your Luvin'" (featuring Nicki Minaj and M.I.A.) – 3:22
- Digital download – Party Rock Remix
1. "Give Me All Your Luvin'" (Party Rock Remix; featuring LMFAO and Nicki Minaj) – 4:03
- CD single
1. "Give Me All Your Luvin'" (featuring Nicki Minaj and M.I.A.) – 3:22
2. "Give Me All Your Luvin'" (Party Rock Remix; featuring LMFAO and Nicki Minaj) – 4:01
- Digital Remix EP
1. "Give Me All Your Luvin'" (Laidback Luke Remix) – 6:06
2. "Give Me All Your Luvin'" (Nicky Romero Remix) – 5:54
3. "Give Me All Your Luvin'" (Party Rock Remix; featuring LMFAO and Nicki Minaj) – 4:01
4. "Give Me All Your Luvin'" (Sultan + Ned Shepard Remix) – 5:59
5. "Give Me All Your Luvin'" (Oliver Twizt Remix) – 4:48
6. "Give Me All Your Luvin'" (Demolition Crew Remix) – 7:02

== Credits and personnel ==
=== Management ===
- Recorded at MSR Studios, New York City and Sarm West Studios, Notting Hill, London
- Nicki Minaj Appears Courtesy of Young Money Entertainment/Cash Money Records | M.I.A. Appears Courtesy of Interscope Records
- Webo Girl Publishing, Inc. (ASCAP), EMI Music Publishing France (SACEM), Money Mack Music/Harajuku Barbie Music, adm. by Songs of Universal, Inc. (BMI), N.E.E.T. Noise/Imagem Music (PRS)

=== Personnel ===
- Madonna Ciccone – writer, singer and record producer
- Martin Solveig – writer, record producer, synths, drums
- Onika Maraj – writer, singer
- Maya Arulpragasam – writer, singer
- Michael Tordjman – writer
- Demacio "Demo" Castellon – recording, mixing
- Philippe Weiss – recording assistant
- Graham Archer – recording assistant
- Jason "Metal" Donkersgoed – additional editing
- Jean Baptiste Gaudray – guitars
- Angie Teo – mixing assistant
- LMFAO – remixing, additional production

Credits and personnel adapted from MDNA album liner notes.

== Charts ==
=== Weekly charts ===
Weekly chart performance for "Give Me All Your Luvin'"
| Chart (2012) | Peak position |
|---|---|
| Australia (ARIA) | 25 |
| Austria (Ö3 Austria Top 40) | 11 |
| Belgium (Ultratop 50 Flanders) | 5 |
| Belgium (Ultratop 50 Wallonia) | 3 |
| Brazil (Billboard Brasil Hot 100) | 6 |
| Brazil (Hot Pop Songs) | 7 |
| Canada Hot 100 (Billboard) | 1 |
| Canada AC (Billboard) | 25 |
| Canada CHR/Top 40 (Billboard) | 13 |
| Canada Hot AC (Billboard) | 13 |
| CIS Airplay (TopHit) | 14 |
| Colombia (National-Report) | 14 |
| Croatia International Airplay (HRT) | 2 |
| Czech Republic Airplay (ČNS IFPI) | 25 |
| Denmark (Tracklisten) | 16 |
| Euro Digital Song Sales (Billboard) | 7 |
| Finland (Suomen virallinen lista) | 1 |
| France (SNEP) | 3 |
| Germany (GfK) | 8 |
| Global Dance Songs (Billboard) | 3 |
| Greece Digital Songs (Billboard) | 2 |
| Hungary (Rádiós Top 40) | 1 |
| Hungary (Single Top 40) | 2 |
| Ireland (IRMA) | 11 |
| Israel International Airplay (Media Forest) | 1 |
| Italy (FIMI) | 2 |
| Italy Airplay (EarOne) | 1 |
| Japan Hot 100 (Billboard) | 3 |
| Lebanon (The Official Lebanese Top 20) | 2 |
| Luxembourg Digital Song Sales (Billboard) | 10 |
| Mexico Anglo (Monitor Latino) | 6 |
| Netherlands (Dutch Top 40) | 18 |
| Netherlands (Single Top 100) | 2 |
| New Zealand (Recorded Music NZ) | 29 |
| Portugal Digital Song Sales (Billboard) | 4 |
| Russia (Russian Digital Chart) | 9 |
| Russia Airplay (TopHit) | 21 |
| Scottish Singles Sales (Official Charts) | 30 |
| Slovakia Airplay (ČNS IFPI) | 3 |
| South Korea (Gaon) | 68 |
| Spain (Promusicae) | 2 |
| Sweden (Sverigetopplistan) | 60 |
| Switzerland (Schweizer Hitparade) | 6 |
| Switzerland (Media Control Romandy) | 3 |
| Ukraine Airplay (TopHit) | 14 |
| UK Singles (Official Charts) | 37 |
| US Billboard Hot 100 | 10 |
| US Adult Pop Airplay (Billboard) | 33 |
| US Dance Club Songs (Billboard) | 1 |
| US Dance Singles Sales (Billboard) | 2 |
| US Dance Airplay (Billboard) | 11 |
| US Pop Airplay (Billboard) | 24 |
| US Rhythmic Airplay (Billboard) | 33 |
| Venezuela Pop Rock (Record Report) | 1 |

=== Year-end charts ===
Year-end chart performance for "Give Me All Your Luvin'"
| Chart (2012) | Position |
|---|---|
| Australia Dance (ARIA) | 49 |
| Belgium (Ultratop 50 Flanders) | 85 |
| Belgium (Ultratop 50 Wallonia) | 47 |
| Brazil (Crowley) | 37 |
| Canada (Canadian Hot 100) | 76 |
| France (SNEP) | 58 |
| Hungary (Rádiós Top 40) | 39 |
| Italy (FIMI) | 37 |
| Italy Airplay (EarOne) | 52 |
| Japan (Japan Hot 100) | 22 |
| Poland (ZPAV) | 19 |
| South Korea International (Gaon) | 33 |
| Spain (PROMUSICAE) | 27 |
| US Dance Club Songs (Billboard) | 41 |

== Certifications and sales ==
Certifications and sales for "Give Me All Your Luvin'"
| Region | Certification | Certified units/sales |
|---|---|---|
| Brazil (Pro-Música Brasil) | 3× Platinum | 180,000^{‡} |
| France | — | 29,816 |
| Italy (FIMI) | Platinum | 30,000^{*} |
| South Korea (Gaon) | — | 339,983 |
| United Kingdom | — | 43,750 |
| United States (RIAA) | Gold | 500,000^{*} |
^{*} Sales figures based on certification alone.^{‡} Sales+streaming figures based on certification alone.

== Release history ==
Release dates for "Give Me All Your Luvin'"
| Country | Date | Format | Label |
|---|---|---|---|
| Worldwide | February 3, 2012 | Digital download | Interscope |
| United States | February 6, 2012 | Contemporary hit radio | Interscope |
| United States | February 7, 2012 | Digital download – Party Rock Remix | Interscope |
| Germany | March 2, 2012 | CD single | Universal Music |
| Poland | March 6, 2012 | CD single | Universal Music |
| United Kingdom | March 19, 2012 | CD single | Polydor |
| Thailand | March 23, 2012 | CD single | Universal Music |

== See also ==
- List of most expensive music videos
- List of Billboard Dance Club Songs number ones of 2015
- List of Billboard Hot 100 top-ten singles in 2012
- List of Canadian Hot 100 number-one singles of 2012
- List of number-one pop hits of 2012 (Brazil)
- List of number-one singles of 2012 (Finland)
- List of top 10 singles in 2012 (France)
