= Monkey Me (song) =

Single by Mylène Farmer

from the album Monkey Me
- B-side: "Remix"
- Released: 30 August 2013 (radio release)
- Recorded: 2012
- Genre: Pop rock
- Length: 4:13 (album version); 3:46 (radio edit)
- Label: Polydor, Universal Music
- Songwriters: Lyrics: Mylène Farmer; Music: Laurent Boutonnat
- Producer: Laurent Boutonnat

Mylène Farmer singles chronology
"Je te dis tout" (2011)	"Monkey Me" (2013)	"Diabolique mon ange" (2013)

"Monkey Me" is a 2012 song by French singer-songwriter Mylène Farmer with music by Laurent Boutonnat. It was the third single from her ninth studio album, Monkey Me, and was released on radio on 30 August 2013, then physically on 7 October of the same year. A music video composed of graphics was available on the web four days earlier. The song was generally well received by critics and the singer's fans who considered it one of the best tracks of the album. In France, it peaked at number three on the week of the release of the physical formats.

== Background and release ==
Farmer hadn't released anything since the single "Je te dis tout" in March 2013 and was being completely silent ever since. During that time, filmmaker and frequent collaborator François Hanss posted online many photos he had taken in a jungle on a recent trip to Congo, which led the singer's fans to presume that the forthcoming single would be "Monkey Me", but there was no official statement.

On 19 July, while her fans were wondering whether she would release a third single from the album, Farmer announced that the eponymous song of the album would be released as a single. For the first time in her career, Farmer proposed to her fans to create the official cover of the single "Monkey Me" and to post their creations on Twitter or Instagram so that she can choose her favorite one. The contest was won by Richard Vanloot.

On 30 August 2013, two versions of the song were sent to radio: a shorter version and a remix named "The ET's Radio Mix".

== Music video ==
On 28 August 2013, it was publicly confirmed that the single would not be promoted by an official music video. However, on 3 October, a video in black and white was launched on the web. Directed by Eric Delmotte and Luc Froehlicher, it consists of computer graphics, and shows buildings collapsing, vegetation that appears and disappears, and crying monkeys, recalling King Kong. As Farmer does not appear in the video, many fans were disappointed. Metro News deemed it "surprising", displaying "an experimental rendering and a rather cryptic global concept". According to Kevin Boucher of Ozap, "the video is not really related with the lyrics but is nevertheless aesthetic". More critical, the SFR Live Concerts site stated after seeing the video: "We remain circumspect. [...] This series of images of destroyed buildings, unsightly and very repetitive, quickly tired. Only expressions of the "monkey" bring a little interest to this video." A survey on the web gathering 722 votes showed that 34,8% of the voters dislike the video while 33,5% of them considered it very well made.

== Reception ==
"Monkey Me" generally received praise from both critics and fans. Jonathan Hamard of Chartsinfrance.net wrote that the song is "the most efficient" one from the album. According to Julien Chadeyron of Le Nouvel Observateur, "Monkey me" is "absolutely fascinating" and "original", noting that it "has everything to become a hit". The website evous.fr wrote that "Monkey Me" is a "very pop-rock" song similar to "L'Instant X" with lyrics about dual identity, pursuing by noting that it's "neither unpleasant nor a hit"; on the same website, a fan compared the song's introduction to Farmer's 2006 song "Devant soi". In a survey asking Farmer's fans which of the "new" songs they would most like to hear during her forthcoming Timeless 2013 tour, "Monkey Me" ranked at number one with 7.3% of the votes.

== Chart performance ==
On the week the album was released, "Monkey Me" entered the French Singles Chart at number 131 due to the album's massive first-week sales, then immediately fell off the top 200. On the chart edition of 7 September 2013, when Farmer began her Timeless tour, the song reentered at number 45, through digital sales only, then immediately dropped. When released under physical formats, it reentered the chart at a peak of number three, selling 7,300 units that week, 3% of them digitally. The next week, it dropped to number 61.

Similarly, on 7 September 2013, "Monkey Me" debuted at number 43 on the Belgian Ultratip chart of Wallonia, and peaked at number 13 in the sixth week. Then it entered the Ultratop chart at number 43, on the chart edition of 19 October 2013.

== Live performances ==
Farmer performed the song during her Timeless tour, debuted on 7 September 2013.

== Formats and track listings ==
- CD single – Promo

No.	Title	Length
1.	"Monkey Me" (edit radio)	3:46

- CD maxi – Promo

No.	Title	Length
1.	"Monkey Me" (The ET's club remix)	6:13
3.	"Monkey Me" (The ET's radio mix)	3:03
4.	"Monkey Me" (album version)	4:13

- Digital download

No.	Title	Length
1.	"Monkey Me" (The ET's radio mix)	3:03

- CD maxi

No.	Title	Length
1.	"Monkey Me" (album version)	4:13
2.	"Monkey Me" (The ET's club remix)	6:13
3.	"Monkey Me" (The ET's radio mix)	3:04
4.	"Monkey Me" (instrumental version)	4:11

- 12" vinyl

No.	Title	Length
1.	"Monkey Me" (The ET's club remix)	6:13
2.	"Monkey Me" (album version)	4:13
3.	"Monkey Me" (The ET's radio mix)	3:04
4.	"Monkey Me" (instrumental version)	4:11

== Official versions ==
Version	Length	Album	Remixed by	Year	Comment
Album version	4:13	Monkey Me	—	2012	
Radio edit	3:46	—	—	2013	The intro and the bridge are shorter.
The ET's radio mix	3:04	—	Amir Afargan	2013	This is a shorter and less rock version.
The ET's club remix	6:13	—	Amir Afargan	2013	
Instrumental	4:11	—	—	2013	

== Charts ==
Chart (2013)	Peak position
Belgian (Wallonia) Ultratop Chart	43
French SNEP Singles Chart	3

== Release history ==
Region	Date	Format
Belgium, France	30 August 2013	Airplay, digital download (single)
Belgium, France	7 October 2013	CD maxi, 12" maxi
