= Regrets (Mylène Farmer and Jean-Louis Murat song) =

Single by Mylène Farmer

from the album L'autre...
- B-side: "Remix"
- Released: 29 July 1991
- Recorded: 1991, France
- Genre: Pop, synthpop, baroque pop, rock
- Length: 4:45
- Label: Polydor
- Songwriters: Lyrics: Mylène Farmer; Music: Laurent Boutonnat
- Producer: Laurent Boutonnat

Mylène Farmer singles chronology
"Désenchantée" (1991)	"Regrets" (1991)	"Je t'aime mélancolie" (1991)

"Regrets" is a 1991 song recorded by French singer-songwriter Mylène Farmer as duet with musician Jean-Louis Murat. The song was released on 29 July 1991 and was the second single from her third studio album L'autre.... The music video was shot in a cemetery in Budapest, as the song deals with a love relationship between two people separated by the death of one of them. This ballad became a top three hit in France and was also successful in Belgium.

== Background and writing ==
"Regrets" was Farmer's first duet and was scheduled as the second single from the album L'autre... since the release of "Désenchantée". According to Farmer, the song was "very long to write". The idea of the duet started from an "irregular but faithful" correspondence through letters between both singers for a year. Murat explained: "One day, in the mailbox, I had a letter from Mylène. She was asking me if I wanted to sing with her. This letter is not a legend, I simply received it by the post. I could not believe my eyes: she was giving me her phone number." Finally Murat called her and they met in Paris.

Already in 1989, Farmer confessed that she liked Murat's songs and his album Cheyenne Automne, and his way of writing. Thus, according to Murat, Farmer had the idea to record a duet with him, and he accepted after listening to an audiotape of "Regrets" in which Farmer sang the two voices – her own and that of Murat trying to make it deeper — which French author Julien Rigal deemed a "legend". At that time, Farmer said in several interviews that she considered Murat as her "brother", her "double", her "twin" and a "poet"; she called her encounter with Murat "fantastic". In the media, Murat said almost the same thing on this matter and on other ones, so much so that the OK magazine established a comparison of the previous interviews given in the press by both singers. However, as noted by author Erwan Chuberre, it remains impossible to really know if the duet was actually motivated by a genuine friendship or by a business strategy, given that the singers wanted to expand their fan bases at the time. In 2004, Murat said in the French newspaper L'Express that "Regrets" helped him to launch his career.

The single was released on 29 July 1991 under various formats, including a CD maxi with a pin's in a limited edition.

In 2000, the recording company scheduled to release the live version of "Regrets" as the second single from the album Mylenium Tour, and thus sent a promotional VHS to the radio stations. However, given the differences with Farmer who preferred "Pas le temps de vivre" as single and the disappointing sales of the previous live singles "Ainsi soit je..." and "Dessine-moi un mouton", the song was finally not released.

== Lyrics and music ==
"Regrets" is a love song in which a couple of lovers are answering tenderly and with melancholy, while they are separated by the death of one of them (Farmer). Indeed, Instant-Mag said that the song deals with the "very romantic theme of the loss of [the lover]. This loss leaves an unfathomable lack in the one who remains, which invests the world of dreams to regain the lost happiness. Only memories then allow to savour the well-being of the past relationship". In his analysis of the song, the psychologist Hugues Royer stated: "Death is a subterfuge to make the impossible love. (...) Is not it easier to romanticize a dead person than a living one who, sooner or later, will show the faces of his faults? It is indeed the fear of everyday life that terrifies the advocates of absolute love." About the lyrics, Farmer explained that she "do[es] not unite regret with the notions of disappointment and failure, rather these things that we could do, but that we decide not to do".

== Music video ==
The video is a Requiem Publishing and Heathcliff SA production whose length is 6:17. Directed by Laurent Boutonnat who also co-authored the screenplay with Farmer, the video was filmed for two days in February 1991 in a Jewish cemetery abandoned in Budapest, with a budget of about 35,000 euros. The train, which leads to the cemetery was turned on only for the video which features, in addition to the two singers, a deer. It was broadcast on television for the first time on 9 September 1991 in Stars 90 on TF1. In an interview, Murat explained that he had been very surprised by the extreme severity and great professionalism shown by Boutonnat during the video's shooting.

At the beginning of the video, a tram stops in front of the entrance of a snow-covered cemetery. Murat gets off from the tram and pushes the front gate. He walks in the cemetery, passes a deer and meditates at a grave. When he sits, Farmer comes behind him and puts her hands on his eyes. Murat takes Farmer by the hand, then they run, laugh and huddled one against the other in the cemetery. They doze off on a tombstone, and after a last embrace, they say goodbye to each other and split off. The man then gets on the tram and goes away.

According to the analysis made by magazine Instant-Mag, the video is the "metaphor of a past and regretted love". It "shows the indispensable link between two people, as well as the inevitability of this link : we can be attached to the other person, but also lose her". With this video, Farmer "reached the quintessance of elegant sadness which lives in her work". According to this analysis, the character played by Murat would be alive and would try to meet that played by Farmer who would be dead. To this end, the train would represent the transition from these two worlds. The deer who flees would be "the symbol of the woman's essence", and the bunch of thistles would evoke "the desire to provoke unconditional love with the other person". As for the immaculate snow, it would participate in the gloomy atmosphere of the video and would symbolize "a mild but deadly mask which isolates" the two opposing parties. Biographer Bernard Violet said that Boutonnat simply transposed the song in the video by adding his personal aesthetic, in this case, a stylized, little contrasted and overexposed black and white. Anything that expresses reality was filmed at normal speed, while all which describes dream, hope or regret, was filmed at slower speed.

== Live performances and cover versions ==
Concerning the promotion of the single, a sole performance was recorded, on the television show Stars 90, broadcast on TF1 on 7 October 1991. It showed Farmer, dressed in white, and lying down a staircase, while Murat, dressed in black, was on the top of the stairs. The performance was actually recorded a few days earlier and the recording lasted approximately six hours as Murat, who was not used to sing on television shows at the time, had some difficulties with his lip sync. As compensation, Farmer sent crates of champagne to technicians the next day. Regarding tours, "Regrets" was sung only during the 1999 Mylenium Tour; on this occasion, Farmer performed the song alone, while a red fire was lighted in the hand of the blue statue of the stage.

In December 2003, SitolC participated in the national competition "Télé Poche", then in two castings : "Génération Métis" and "Graine de star". On these occasions, he recorded a cover of "Regrets" which was deemed unsuccessful.

== Critical reception ==
The song received positive reviews. French magazine Smash Hits said : "We fall in love. (...) "Regrets" is one of the best tracks on the album. (...) This song, with its elegance, deserves to be number 1 on the Top". Jeune et Jolie deemed the song a "magical and moving duet". OK ironically stated the song is "desperately distressed of beauty". According to Elia Habib, an expert of French charts, "Regrets" is "a slow [song], which successfully blends the singer's voice [that of Farmer], which merges into the melody to that of Murat, which stands out and thus puts her partner off the scent". In contrast, French television host Marc Toesca, who presented the singles chart, said in the Best magazine that he did not particularly appreciate the song.

Although "Regrets" was released in the summer, its sales were rather satisfactory. In France, the single started at number 20 on 24 August 1991, reached the top ten the next week and stayed there for ten consecutive weeks, including a peak at number three on 21 September. It totaled 16 weeks in the top 50. "Regrets" was even certified Silver disc by the Syndicat National de l'Édition Phonographique on 19 December 1991 for over 125,000 units. In Belgium, the song debuted at number 22, entered the top ten and reached number two for two consecutive weeks. It totaled nine weeks in the top five and 18 weeks in the top 30. In France, the single was re-edited in February 2018 and re-entered the chart at number four.

== Formats and track listings ==
These are the formats and track listings of single releases of "Regrets":

- 7" single

No.	Title	Length
1.	"Regrets" (single version)	4:45
2.	"Regrets" (classic bonus beat)	4:50

- 7" maxi

No.	Title	Length
1.	"Regrets" (extended club remix)	7:13
2.	"Regrets" (sterger dub remix)	5:55

- CD maxi / CD maxi – Limited edition with a pin's

No.	Title	Length
1.	"Regrets" (single version)	4:45
2.	"Regrets" (extended club remix)	7:13
3.	"Regrets" (sterger dub remix)	5:55

- Cassette (double length)

No.	Title	Length
1.	"Regrets" (single version)	4:45
2.	"Regrets" (classic bonus beat)	4:50

- 7" single – Promo (double length)

No.	Title	Length
1.	"Regrets" (single version)	4:45

== Official versions ==
Version	Length	Album	Remixed by	Year	Comment
Album version	5:10	L'autre...	—	1991	See the previous sections
Single version	4:45	—	—	1991	The introduction and musical bridge are shortcuts.
Classic bonus mix (single version)	4:50	—	Laurent Boutonnat	1991	The two voices are particularly underlined and the piano replaces the drum kit.
Classic bonus mix (maxi version)	5:09	—	Laurent Boutonnat	1991	The two voices are particularly underlined and the piano replaces the drum kit.
Music video	6:17	L'autre, Music Videos I	—	1991	
Extended club remix	7:13	Dance Remixes	Laurent Boutonnat	1991	This version contains a long introduction in which the two singers are answering each other with words not sung. Words are actually sampled in a phonetic reversal. All the lyrics from the original version are sung.
Sterger dub mix	5:56	—	Laurent Boutonnat	1991	All the words are sampled in a phonetic reversal, accompanied by dance sonorities. The name of the remix, 'Sterger', is the reverse of 'Regrets'.
Live version (recorded in 2000)	5:12	Mylenium Tour	—	2000	Farmer performed the song alone, including the lyrics sung by Murat in the original version. (see Mylenium Tour (tour))

== Credits and personnel ==
These are the credits and the personnel as they appear on the back of the single:

- Mylène Farmer – lyrics
- Laurent Boutonnat – music
- Requiem Publishing – editions
- Polydor – recording company
- Marianne Rosensthiel (Sygma) – photo
- Henry Neu / Com'N.B – design

== Charts and sales ==
Chart (1991)	Peak position
Belgium (Ultratop 50 Wallonia)	2
Europe (European Airplay Top 50)	22
Europe (European Hot 100)	19
French SNEP Singles Chart	3
Chart (2018)	Peak position
French SNEP Singles Chart^{1}	4

^{1} Physical sales only, not charted on the main chart

Region	Certification	Certified units/sales
France (SNEP)	Silver	300,000

== Release history ==
Region	Date	Format
France, Belgium	Early July 1991	Promo 7" maxi
France, Belgium	29 July 1991	7" single, 7" maxi, CD maxi, Cassette
