= L'autre... =

Studio album by Mylène Farmer
- Released: 8 April 1991
- Recorded: Paris
- Genres: Pop, Trip Hop
- Length: 53:48
- Language: French
- Label: Polydor
- Producer: Laurent Boutonnat

Mylène Farmer chronology
En concert (1989)	L'autre... (1991)	Dance Remixes (1992)

Alternative cover
- Collector edition

Singles from L'autre...
- 1. "Désenchantée" Released: 18 March 1991; 2. "Regrets" Released: 29 July 1991; 3. "Je t'aime mélancolie" Released: December 1991; 4. "Beyond My Control" Released: May 1992

L'autre... is the third studio album by Mylène Farmer, released on 8 April 1991. It contains the singer's biggest hit, "Désenchantée", which was number one in France for nine weeks, and another three top ten hits. The album received mixed reviews from music critics but was a great success in terms of chart and sales (#1 for twenty weeks), becoming the best-selling album throughout the singer's career and the twenty-second best-selling album of all time in France.

== Background ==
After her first concert tour in 1989, Mylène Farmer released the new song "À quoi je sers..." which was a synthesis of her musical work and marked the end of an age. While the album En concert was charted, she took advantage of the following months to travel in various countries including India, and to discover new literary works, such as those of Emil Cioran in which she drew inspiration. She also became interested in painting and visited many art galleries and museums that were also sources of inspiration for her. Then she decided to compose a third studio album which was recorded at the studios Mega. This one showed an evolution of the singer : indeed, the texts marked a change of mindset and testified to a transformation in her life including a greater openness to the other (hence the album's title). From that moment, the singer decided to more express herself and went to the meeting of her fellow man. Writing for five months, this album was the result of all what has happened to Farmer "at personal and artistic levels".

For this new album, Farmer changed her hairstyle because she wanted a different look without changing : she opted for a very short hair cut, made by Jean-Marc Maniatis. The album cover, much more luminous than that of Ainsi soit je..., shows Farmer lying on a white background with a crow on her shoulder (this cover was undoubtedly inspired by the Edgar Allan Poe's poem The Raven). The singer explained that the crow on the cover was not for her a sign of doom, but had rather a role of a protective ally. The album was eventually released in April 1991, one month after the marketing of the single "Désenchantée" which was #1 on the French Singles Charts. It was released in Europe, in francophone countries and Japan.

The album had the particularity to contain the first duet of Farmer, "Regrets", recorded with Jean-Louis Murat (in 1987, Farmer had already sung "Frantz" in a show with Guy Béart, but this duet hadn't appeared on an album). Laurent Boutonnat decided to record the songs of the album in English-language, but they were ultimately not used. He also wanted to release as singles all the songs from the album, but that didn't happen because of a lack of money.

== Lyrics and music ==
Farmer explained the album's content in an interview: "What changed is that I don't want no more to feel pity for myself and to settle old scores. (...) I am much more shameless in this album than in the previous one. (...) Speak about what I feel in my heart and in my soul, it is a way of revealing myself." However, this album re-uses the old themes dear to the singer: indeed, death, religion, social revolt, despair, sexuality and madness are tackled in the various songs.

== Critical reception ==
Professional ratings
Review scores
Source	Rating
AllMusic	4.5/5 stars
DeBaser'	3/5 stars
1001 Albums Generator	2.76/5 stars

L'autre... received mixed reviews from music critics. France Soir said this album is "a techno pop very well produced". Midi Libre stated : "This album will bring fair satisfactions to many people. The general atmosphere seems much less crooked than usual". The musicians are "excellent" and the songs are "good". Télé Loisirs saw in this album "a more assertive maturity, a less shaken personality". L'autre... was even elected best album of 1991 by the readers of Smash hits.

However, DeBaser rated the album three stars out of five and observed that while effective, the album's sound is very simple, little refined, suggesting that it was not as musically ambitious as her later work.

== Commercial performance ==
In France, the album went straight to number one on the French Album Chart on 8 April 1991 and stayed there for twenty consecutive weeks. As a result, at the time, Farmer topped both the Album and Singles Charts (with "Désenchantée"). The next sixteen weeks, the album dropped to #26, but reached again #3, three weeks later, thanks to the release of "Je t'aime mélancolie". The album appeared for a total of 55 weeks on the chart (Top 40), 32 of them in the top five. The album was certified Diamond disc by the SNEP for a minimum of one million copies sold. To date, L'autre... is the best-selling album of Farmer.

In other countries, the album's sales were more conservative. In Switzerland, the album appeared for nine weeks on the chart, from 26 May to 8 September 1991, peaking at #27 on 25 August. In Sweden, it was #45 on 31 July 1991 and was ranked #55 in Germany.

== Track listing ==
L'autre...
No.	Title	Lyrics	Music	Live performances	Length
1.	"Agnus Dei"	Mylène Farmer	Laurent Boutonnat		5:47
2.	"Désenchantée"	Mylène Farmer	Laurent Boutonnat	Tour 1996; Mylenium Tour; Avant que l'ombre... à Bercy; Tour 2009; Timeless 2013; Live 2019; Nevermore 2023/2024	5:22
3.	"L'autre..."	Mylène Farmer	Laurent Boutonnat		5:26
4.	"Je t'aime mélancolie"	Mylène Farmer	Laurent Boutonnat	Tour 1996; Avant que l'ombre... à Bercy; Timeless 2013	5:29
5.	"Psychiatric"	Mylène Farmer	Laurent Boutonnat		6:12
6.	"Regrets" (duet with Jean-Louis Murat)	Mylène Farmer	Laurent Boutonnat	Mylenium Tour	5:17
7.	"Pas de doute"	Mylène Farmer	Laurent Boutonnat	Avant que l'ombre... à Bercy; Live 2019	5:09
8.	"Il n'y a pas d'ailleurs"	Mylène Farmer	Laurent Boutonnat	Mylenium Tour	5:50
9.	"Beyond My Control" (uncredited vocal by John Malkovich)	Mylène Farmer	Laurent Boutonnat	Mylenium Tour	5:22
10.	"Nous souviendrons-nous"	Mylène Farmer	Laurent Boutonnat	Tour 1996; Timeless 2013	5:05

== Personnel ==
- Text: Mylène Farmer
- Music: Laurent Boutonnat
- Keyboard and arrangement: Laurent Boutonnat
- Piano on "Désenchantée": Bruno Fontaine
- Guitars: Slim Pezin
- Acoustic basses: Bernard Paganotti
- Military step on "Il n'y a pas d'ailleurs": Philippe Draï
- Flute and harp: Pol Ramirez Del Piu
- Rhythmic programmings: Thierry Rogen, Laurent Boutonnat
- Programmer: Patrice Rouillon Tsernsoff de Gironville
- Vocals: Mylène Farmer
- Sound engineer: Thierry Rogen
- Assistant: Lionel Philippe
- Editions: Requiem Publishing, Paul van Parys
- Management: Thierry Suc
- Cover design: Com'N.B
- Photos: Marianne Rosenstiehl (Sygma)
- Mastering and engraving: André Perriat (Top Master)
- Recorded and mixed at Studio Mega
- Production: Toutankhamon, Laurent Boutonnat, Thierry Rogen

Except for "Désenchantée": Carole Fredericks, Beckie Bell, Debbie Davis, with the participation of Sophie, Dominique, Edwige, Mandy and Cécile

== Charts ==
=== Weekly charts ===
Chart performance for L'autre...
Chart (1991)	Peak position
Belgian Albums (SABAM/IFPI)	1
Dutch Albums (Album Top 100)	57
European Albums (Music & Media)	15
French Albums (SNEP)	1
German Albums (Offizielle Top 100)	55
Swedish Albums (Sverigetopplistan)	45
Swiss Albums (Schweizer Hitparade)	27

=== Year-end charts ===
Year-end chart performance for L'autre...
Chart (1991)	Position
European Albums (Music & Media)	42
French Albums (SNEP)	8

== Certifications and sales ==
Region	Certification	Certified units/sales
Belgium (BRMA)	Gold	25,000^{*}
France (SNEP)	Diamond	1,800,000
Switzerland (IFPI Switzerland)	Gold	25,000^{^}
Summaries
Worldwide	—	2,000,000
^{*} Sales figures based on certification alone.^{^} Shipments figures based on certification alone.

== Formats ==
- 12"
- CD
- Cassette
- Collector edition - Format : 12" - Limited and numbered edition (5,000)^{1}
- CD - Japan
- CD - Taïwan
- CD - Digipack (since 2005)

^{1} Contains the CD album L'autre..., the CD maxi for "Désenchantée", a watch illustrated by "Désenchantée", three photos and an excerpt from the music video for "Désenchantée".
