= Monkey Me =

Studio album by Mylène Farmer
- Released: 3 December 2012
- Genres: Dance-pop, synth-pop, pop rock
- Label: Polydor
- Producer: Laurent Boutonnat

Mylène Farmer chronology
2001.2011 (2011)	Monkey Me (2012)	Timeless 2013 (2013)

Singles from Monkey Me
- 1. "À l'ombre" Released: 22 October 2012; 2. "Je te dis tout" Released: 28 January 2013; 3. "Monkey Me" Released: 30 August 2013

Professional ratings
Review scores
Source	Rating
Pure Charts	link
Voici	3/5 stars
La Dernière Heure	Favorable
Evous	link
Party	4/5 stars
A Voir A Lire	link

Monkey Me is the ninth studio album by French singer-songwriter Mylène Farmer, and her 18th album overall. Preceded by the lead single "À l'ombre", which peaked at number-one in France, the album was released on 3 December 2012. Despite mixed reviews from critics, it entered the French album chart at number one selling almost 150,000 copies in its first week. The album was certified 3× Platinum within its first month of release in France.

The album was supported by the sold-out Timeless tour the following year.

== Critical reception ==
In France, the album entered the charts at number one on 15 December 2012, with cumulative sales of 147,530 units (137,590 physical formats and 9,940 downloads), which was the best weekly sales of 2012 in France.

Despite its strong sales, the album received mixed reviews from the press. On one hand, many critics welcomed the return of Laurent Boutonnat in the songwriting process; on the other hand, others, for example the magazine 7 sur 7, found the arrangements very dated.

== Singles ==
Year	Title	Date of release	Sales (France)	Certification		Peak position		
Year	Title	Date of release	Sales (France)	FR	BE (WA)	FR	BE (WA)	SWI
2012	"À l'ombre"	22 October 2012 (digital); 26 November 2012 (CD, vinyl)	45,000	—	—	1	2	—
2013	"Je te dis tout"	28 January 2013 (digital); March 2013 (CD, vinyl)	10,000	—	—	3	28	—
2013	"Monkey Me"	7 October 2013 (CD, vinyl)	7,300	—	—	3	—43	—

- "Quand" was released as a lyric video.
- For the first time in her career, Farmer invited her fans to design the official cover of the single "Monkey Me" and post their creations on Twitter or Instagram so that she can choose her favorite one.

== Track listing ==
No.	Title	Lyrics	Music	Length
1.	"Elle a dit"	Mylène Farmer	Laurent Boutonnat	3:52
2.	"À l'ombre"	Mylène Farmer	Laurent Boutonnat	4:51
3.	"Monkey Me"	Mylène Farmer	Laurent Boutonnat	4:13
4.	"Tu ne le dis pas"	Mylène Farmer	Laurent Boutonnat	4:22
5.	"Love Dance"	Mylène Farmer	Laurent Boutonnat	4:06
6.	"Quand"	Mylène Farmer	Laurent Boutonnat	4:07
7.	"J'ai essayé de vivre..."	Mylène Farmer	Laurent Boutonnat	4:40
8.	"Ici-bas"	Mylène Farmer	Laurent Boutonnat	4:33
9.	"A-t-on jamais"	Mylène Farmer	Laurent Boutonnat	3:47
10.	"Nuit d'hiver"	Laurent Boutonnat	Laurent Boutonnat	5:24
11.	"À force de..."	Mylène Farmer	Laurent Boutonnat	4:08
12.	"Je te dis tout"	Mylène Farmer	Laurent Boutonnat	5:30

== Charts ==
=== Weekly charts ===
Chart (2012)	Peak position
Belgian Albums (Ultratop Flanders)	29
Belgian Albums (Ultratop Wallonia)	1
French Albums (SNEP)	1
Swiss Albums (Schweizer Hitparade)	3
Swiss Albums (Schweizer Hitparade Romandy)	1

=== Year-end charts ===
Chart (2012)	Position
Belgian Albums (Ultratop Wallonia)	24
French Albums (SNEP)	7
Chart (2013)	Position
Belgian Albums (Ultratop Wallonia)	34
French Albums (SNEP)	72

== Certifications and sales ==
Region	Certification	Certified units/sales
Belgium (BRMA)	Platinum	30,000^{*}
France (SNEP)	3× Platinum	400,000
Summaries
Worldwide	—	500,000
^{*} Sales figures based on certification alone.

== Formats ==
- Limited Numbered Edition Collector Box (CD + Pure Audio Blu-ray)
- Limited Edition Digipak CD (CD + Pure Audio Blu-ray)
- 2 × Vinyl
- CD
