= À l'ombre =

Single by Mylène Farmer

from the album Monkey Me
- B-side: "Instrumental"
- Released: 26 November 2012
- Recorded: 2012
- Genre: Electropop
- Length: 4:51 (album version); 4:45 (radio edit)
- Label: Polydor, Universal Music
- Songwriters: Lyrics: Mylène Farmer; Music: Laurent Boutonnat
- Producer: Laurent Boutonnat

Mylène Farmer singles chronology
"Du temps" (2011)	"À l'ombre" (2012)	"Je te dis tout" (2013)

Music video
- "À l'ombre" on YouTube

"À l'ombre" (English: In the Shadow) is a song recorded by the French singer Mylène Farmer. This electropop song was written by Farmer with music composed by Laurent Boutonnat. It was the lead single from her ninth studio album Monkey Me (2012), released on 22 October 2012 digitally, and on 26 November in physical formats. It debuted at number four on the French chart, dropped out of the top 50, and then rose to number one on the chart edition of 8 December 2012. It also peaked in the Belgian (Walloon) chart at number two.

== History ==
On 16 October 2012, the RTL journalist Anthony Martin revealed on Twitter the title of Farmer's new single, and it was said that the music and lyrics were respectively of Boutonnat and Farmer. Two days later, the cover of the CD single was shown on Twitter by Polydor France. On 22 October, the song was sent to radio stations and simultaneously was made available on the download platforms from 8:00 am. Remixes by Guéna LG and then by The Young Professionals were posted on social networks in early November.

== Music and lyrics ==
"À l'ombre" is an electropop, dance song similar in style to the songs on Farmer's Point de suture album. The lyrics describe somebody, potentially Farmer, wallowing in self-doubt and questioning their self-worth. They also may allude to a disillusionment with the struggle to stay famous and viable. The sombre mood of the song fits in with Farmer's attraction to misery and despair as seen on previous tracks Je t'aime mélancolie and Fuck Them All.

== Music video ==
Farmer in the music video for "À l'ombre". The scene depicted is directly inspired by the French artist Olivier de Sagazan's work Transfiguration.

On 29 November 2012, TF1 announced on its site that an excerpt of the music video for "À l'ombre" would be shown three days later on the evening new programme, and that Farmer would be interviewed by the news presenter Claire Chazal the next day. On 1 December 2012, indeed, a one-minute preview of the music video was shown at the end of the broadcast. The video was directed by Laurent Boutonnat and inspired by the French artist Olivier de Sagazan, and especially his work Transfiguration. De Sagazan said that Farmer contacted him and that he agreed to perform in the video, and explained that the "unfolding of [his] the work makes the chronology of the video", adding that his work deals with a "large organic chaos". The music video was shot in Paris in November 2012, in an 800-square meter studio.

According to the newspaper Le Point, "Sagazan's work is a mixture of beautiful, and sometimes disturbing, painting and sculpture which plays with appearances and fears. The work of the performer looks so much like the singer's world that one wonders why both did not meet earlier." Just after the news broadcast, the full music video was available on the TF1 website. It shows Farmer singing, dancers performing a choreography in the mud, de Sagazan covering his face with mud and wolves running in the fog.

Thomas Montet of Pure People deemed the video "disturbing", seeing in it "the praise of madness". According to de Sagazan, the music video is "magnificent".

== Reception ==
According to Julien Chadeyron of Le Nouvel Observateur, "À l'ombre" is "so effective and haunting".

In France, two hours after its availability on digital platforms, the song became number one on iTunes. On the chart edition of 27 October 2012, the song entered the French chart at number four, with 8,875 downloads, then dropped to number 69 with 960 downloads. It continued to drop the following two weeks, falling out of the top 100, then climbed to number 59, and reached number one the next week, when the physical formats were released, selling 22,027 units that week. "À l'ombre" thus became Farmer's twelfth number one solo and thirteenth overall single in France. Then it dropped to number 21.

In the French-speaking part of Belgium (Wallonia), the song entered the Ultratop 50 at number six on 3 November 2012, then dropped to number 34 and fell until the last rank of the chart the next two weeks before rocketing to number 19 in the fifth week, then to number three and eventually to number two.

== Formats and track listings ==
- CD single

No.	Title	Length
1.	"À l'ombre" (single version)	4:51
2.	"À l'ombre" (instrumental)	4:48

- CD maxi 1

No.	Title	Length
1.	"À l'ombre" (single version)	4:51
2.	"À l'ombre" (Offer Nissim club remix)	7:31
3.	"À l'ombre" (TYP remix club)	7:00
4.	"À l'ombre" (Guéna LG new chords radio remix)	3:49

- CD maxi 2

No.	Title	Length
1.	"À l'ombre" (single version)	4:51
2.	"À l'ombre" (Guéna LG remix)	7:00
3.	"À l'ombre" (Tony Romera club remix)	6:00
4.	"À l'ombre" (instrumental)	4:48

- 12" maxi

No.	Title	Length
1.	"À l'ombre" (Tony Romera club remix)
2.	"À l'ombre" (Guéna LG remix)
3.	"À l'ombre" (Offer Nissim club remix)
4.	"À l'ombre" (TYP remix club)
5.	"À l'ombre" (single version)

- CD single – Promo

No.	Title	Length
1.	"À l'ombre" (radio edit)	4:45

- CD maxi – Promo – Remixes

No.	Title	Length
1.	"À l'ombre" (TYP remix club)	7:00
2.	"À l'ombre" (Tony Romera club remix)	6:00
3.	"À l'ombre" (Offer Nissim club remix)	7:13
4.	"À l'ombre" (Guena LG remix)	7:59
5.	"À l'ombre" (TYP remix – radio version)	4:20
6.	"À l'ombre" (Tony Romera radio remix)	3:26
7.	"À l'ombre" (Offer Nissim radio remix)	4:12
8.	"À l'ombre" (Guena LG new chords radio remix)	3:49

- Digital download

No.	Title	Length
1.	"À l'ombre" (single version)	4:50
2.	"À l'ombre" (Offer Nissim club remix)	7:14
3.	"À l'ombre" (TYP remix club)	7:01
4.	"À l'ombre" (Guena LG new chords radio remix)	3:48
5.	"À l'ombre" (Guena LG remix)	7:59
6.	"À l'ombre" (Tony Romera club remix)	6:59
7.	"À l'ombre" (Instrumental)	4:48

== Credits and personnel ==
These are the credits and the personnel as they appear on the back of the single:

- Mylène Farmer – lyrics
- Laurent Boutonnat – music
- Requiem Publishing – editions
- Nathalie Delépine – photograph
- Henry Neu – design
- Made in the E.U.

== Charts ==
=== Peak positions ===
Chart (2012-20)	Peak position
Belgian (Flanders) Ultratip Chart	75
Belgian (Wallonia) Singles Chart	2
Belgian (Wallonia) Airplay Chart	4
Belgian (Wallonia) Dance Chart	11
French SNEP Singles Chart	1
French Airplay Chart	60
Hungary (Single Top 40)	32

=== Year-end charts ===
Chart (2012)	Position
Belgian (Wallonia) Singles Chart	87
French Singles Chart	95

== Release history ==
Region	Date	Format
Belgium, France	22 October 2012	Digital download (single)
Belgium, France	26 November 2012	CD single, CD maxi 1, CD maxi 2, 12" maxi, Digital download (remixes)

== See also ==
- List of number-one hits of 2012 (France)
- List of artists who reached number one on the French Singles Chart
