= Je te dis tout =

Single by Mylène Farmer

from the album Monkey Me
- Released: 28 January 2013
- Recorded: 2012
- Genre: Synthpop
- Length: 5:31 (album version); 4:10 (edit)
- Label: Polydor, Universal Music
- Songwriters: Lyrics: Mylène Farmer; Music: Laurent Boutonnat
- Producer: Laurent Boutonnat

Mylène Farmer singles chronology
"À l'ombre" (2012)	"Je te dis tout" (2013)	"Monkey Me" (2013)

Music video
- "Je te dis tout" on YouTube

"Je te dis tout" is a song by the French singer songwriter Mylène Farmer. This ballad was written by Farmer with music composed by Laurent Boutonnat. It was the second single from her ninth studio album Monkey Me (2012), and was released digitally on 28 January 2013 and physically on 4 March 2013. The music video was directed by François Hanss.

== Release and theme ==
On 24 January 2013, it was said that "Je te dis tout" would be the second single from the Monkey Me album. A one-minute shortened version of the song was sent to radios in a promotional CD displaying a big red "M" in the center of the cover. The song was available on digital platforms on 28 January 2013. On 20 April 2013, 1,000 units of a picture disc CD were available for sale (although units numbered over 1,000 were sold) in 170 independent record stores throughout France.

Alongside "Quand", "Je te dis tout" is one of the two ballads on the album. The song deals with the absolute love; Farmer, the writer, is very explicit in the lyrics that sound like a declaration of love as she had rarely sung in the past.

== Critical reception ==
The song was generally praised and often considered the best track of the album. Julien Chadeyron of Le Nouvel Observateur deemed "Je te dis tout" "a melancholy, sexual, intoxicant song", being the "perfect harmony". On evous.fr, the song is presented as "one of the beautiful lyrics of the album", even "of [Farmer's] career", the song itself being qualified as "perfect, magic".

== Music video ==
Directed by François Hanss on 14 January 2013, the music video was officially revealed on 29 January 2013 on a website named jetedistout.com, and the Internet users had to share the link to see an image from the video, then to unlock the full video. The video was shot in the Parc de l'Abbaye in Chaalis, in the Oise department, France. The video shows the singer, first alone in a boat on a foggy lake and then with a horse she tries to tame; she alternatively can be seen walking in a forest and whispering in the horse's ear. Many features recall some of Farmer's 1980s and 1990s videos, particularly the ones for the singles "Plus grandir in 1985, "Libertine" in 1986, "Tristana" in 1987, "Ainsi soit je...", "Pourvu qu'elles soient douces" in 1988, "Allan" and "À quoi je sers..." in 1989, "Je te rends ton amour" in 1999 and "Innamoramento" in 2000, so that Laure Costey of Gala considered that "visually, one would think this is a come back to the singer's past".

The video generally received positive reviews. Journalist Hugues Royer of Voici stated: "With elegance and finesse, Mylène Farmer revisits her own legend, multiplying winks to her repertoire"; he deemed the images "sublime" and the atmosphere "haunting and melancholy", despite a "simple, even uncluttered" screenplay, and the love story with the horse an "original" and "bold" metaphor to illustrate the theme of the song. Similarly, Julie Delafontaine of 20 minutes was surprised by the fact that Farmer "declares her love to a horse". According to Émilie Perez of People Plurielles, the video displays a "very poetic atmosphere". Eliane da Costa of Closer magazine said that Farmer "surprises her fans with a video far from the disturbing world of the leading single "À l'ombre"", and that she appears "tender, moving", adding, "François Hanss gives us a very aesthetic video." To Kevin Boucher of PureMédias, the music video is both "moving and melancholy". Jean-Frédéric Tronche of Le Nouvel Observateur deemed the video displays "a typical atmosphere" of the singer's style. Thomas Montet of Pure People said the video is "unpretentious, poetic and metaphorical". A review on greatsong.net deemed that "although the video is poetic and aesthetically pleasing, it makes some fans nostalgic of Mylène's old clips, real short films." More critical, Fiona Ipert of Le Figaro considered that "despite a promising title, "Je te dis tout", [there is] nothing new in the poetic and Gothic universe of the redhead singer".

== Performances ==
On 26 January 2013, Farmer performed "Je te dis tout" on the NRJ Music Awards show at the Palais des Festivals in Cannes, broadcast on TF1., and she performed it on her Timeless 2013 tour.

== Chart performance ==
On 2 February 2013, "Je te dis tout" debuted at number 33 on the Belgian (Wallonia) Ultratip Chart, and eventually climbed to number 4 in the sixth week. Then, on the chart edition of 16 March 2013, it entered the Ultratop 40 at number 28. In France, it entered the chart at number 59 on 25 February 2013, then reached a peak of number three, selling 7,200 units that week. The next week, the single dropped to number 45.

== Formats and track listings ==
These are the formats and track listings of single releases of "Je te dis tout":

- CD single

No.	Title	Length
1.	"Je te dis tout" (album version)	5:31
2.	"Je te dis tout" (instrumental)	5:28
3.	"Je te dis tout" (radio edit)	4:10

- 12" maxi

No.	Title	Length
1.	"Je te dis tout" (album version)	5:30
2.	"Je te dis tout" (instrumental)	5:30

- CD single – Promo

No.	Title	Length
1.	"Je te dis tout" (edit)	4:10

- Digital download

No.	Title	Length
1.	"Je te dis tout" (edit)	4:10

- CD single - Picture disc - Limited edition

No.	Title	Length
1.	"Je te dis tout" (album version)	5:30
2.	"Je te dis tout" (instrumental)	5:20

== Charts ==
Chart (2013)	Peak position
Belgian (Wallonia) Ultratop Chart	28
French SNEP Singles Chart	3

== Release history ==
Region	Date	Format
Belgium, France	28 January 2013	Digital download (single)
Belgium, France	4 March 2013	CD single, 12" maxi
France	20 April 2013	CD picture disc
