= Je t'aime mélancolie =

Single by Mylène Farmer

from the album L'autre...
- Released: December 1991
- Recorded: 1991, France
- Genre: Synthpop, new jack swing
- Length: 4:20 (single version); 5:29 (album version)
- Label: Polydor
- Songwriters: Lyrics: Mylène Farmer; Music: Laurent Boutonnat
- Producer: Laurent Boutonnat

Mylène Farmer singles chronology
"Regrets" (1991)	"Je t'aime mélancolie" (1991)	"Beyond My Control" (1992)
Sans contrefaçon (J.C.A. remix) (2003)	Je t'aime mélancolie (Felix Da Housecat remix) (2003)	L'Instant X (the X key mix by One-T) (2003)

Alternative cover
- 12" maxi for the 2003 version by Felix Da Housecat

"Je t'aime mélancolie" (English: "I Love You Melancholy") is a 1991 song recorded by the French artist Mylène Farmer. The song was released as the third single from her third studio album L'autre..., in December 1991. Characterized by its gloomy lyrics and its music video shot on a boxing ring, it achieved success, becoming a top ten hit in France and Belgium.

== Background and writing ==
In late 1991, "Pas de doute" was chosen to be the third single from L'autre.... However, "Je t'aime mélancolie" was finally released instead. At the time, a fan from Nancy who wanted to meet Farmer killed the receptionist of Polydor, her recording company in Paris, shooting him with a rifle because he refused to give him the singer's address. After this tragedy, Farmer went into exile in the U.S.

The single was released in France and Germany, and for the first time, among the formats available for the single, there was a voluminous promotional object, namely a carton pyramid containing the visual of the 12" maxi with at its base the promotional CD in a digipack case. The four 1991 remixes were all produced by Thierry Rogen. The radio stations aired one of these remixed versions, shorter, instead of the single version. The song was eventually released on 15 December 1991, including as CD maxi which contained a then unreleased song entitled "Mylène Is Calling".

In 2003, the song was remixed by the famous DJ Felix Da Housecat for the remixes compilation RemixeS. This version was even released as a second single from this album in November that year; it was not aired on radio but was successful in nightclubs.

== Lyrics and music ==
The song deals with melancholy and suicide. "Je t'aime mélancolie" is also the singer's ironic response to journalists who criticize her because of her image of sad singer and her great success. In this song, Farmer "acts as an observer of her own life", and "claims her love for melancholy, sadness and loneliness". The singer demonstrates "the important role that takes the pain in life", as she confesses: "Melancholy is one of my favorite topics. I love this bittersweet state, even if it is somewhat painful."

According to author Sophie Khairallah, the notes are "low, dark and jerky" in the couplets, which suggests "a submission to melancholy". However, the refrains are "lighter". The fact that Farmer is singing in low notes in the verses, like on "Porno graphique" and "C'est dans l'air", is deemed by the psychologist Hugues Royer as a sign of humor.

== Music video ==
The video was directed by Laurent Boutonnat who also wrote the screenplay. This Requiem Publishing and Heathcliff SA production cost about 75,000 euros and was shot in Los Angeles for four days: two for the fight in the boxing ring, and the two others for the choreography. The sexy clothes that Farmer and her dancers wear - notably black garter belts - while they are on the boxing ring in the video were made by the French fashion designer Jean-Paul Gaultier. Farmer was forced to take an intensive physical preparation for two days for the video and had a sports coach to be more credible, although the sports scenes were performed by a stunt woman. The man with whom she boxes is Croatian dancer and choreographer Emil Matešić.

At the beginning of the video, Farmer and a man are training in a gymnasium to participate in a boxing fight. Then they go into the ring and the bell sounds, announcing the beginning of the fight. Both athletes are given numerous, violent punches. The video is interspersed with images of Farmer and ten female dancers who perform a choreographed dance on the ring. During the second round, the boxer attacks Farmer with prohibited punches and kicks. At this moment, the referee intervenes but the man hits him and stuns him. Both boxers then withdraw their gloves and engage in a free-for-all. Finally, Farmer wins the fight.

The video was acclaimed by the lesbians and feminist movements because it showed that women could surpass men. According to biographer Bernard Violet, the colors chosen highlight the flamboyant hair of the singer which contrast with her very white face. Unlike Farmer's previous videos, this one is very simple and deals with a story in which everyone can find a moral and metaphysical duality between Good and Evil, God and the Devil. French magazine Ciné Télé Plus stated that the video "cultivates ambiguity and provocation". The most likely interpretation of this video might make reference to the confrontational relationship between Farmer and the media. The fight would be the symbol of the singer's defense regarding her right to suffer and to talk about it in her songs. This video may also mean that Farmer "crushes the masculinity", symbol of authority.

== Live performances ==
Farmer performed her song in playback in three French television shows : Sacrée Soirée (11 Décember 1991, TF1), Tous à la Une (27 December 1991, TF1; she also sang "L'Autre"), and Stars 90 (13 January 1992, TF1). She also appeared in a German television program in which she sang "Je t'aime mélancolie", as the song was recorded in the country too: Ein Kessel Buntes, in March 1992. These performances were accompanied by a choreography made for the first time in Farmer's career by the singer herself. She wore black and red clothes on these occasions, while her dancers wore the reverse.

"Je t'aime mélancolie" was performed during the 1996 and 2006 series concerts at Bercy and was thus included on the live albums and VHS or DVD Live à Bercy and Avant que l'ombre... à Bercy. In the choreographied performance of 1996, Farmer wore a red shirt, pants and bra, the male dancers were dressed with clear pants and shirt, and the female dancers had a kimono in brown satin. During the musical bridge, all dancers performed rhythmical steps under a play of lights. At the beginning of the 2006 performance, the main stage was illuminated and had five large white borders. Farmer, accompanied by four female dancers, sang with a choreography, first elevated and behind a clear sail, then, during the second chorus, before the sails that began to constantly up and down. The song was also performed three evenings during the 2000 Mylenium Tour in Russia, instead of "Beyond My Control", and during the 2009 tour in Saint-Petersburg, instead of "Je te rends ton amour", but does not appear on the live albums recorded during these tours.

The song was also performed on the singer's Timeless 2013 tour, and is included in the home DVD/Blu-Ray release and the accompanying live album.

== B-side: "Mylène Is Calling" ==
The CD maxi contains a new song, "Mylène Is Calling".

The few words ("Allô oui c'est moi / Tu n'est pas là / Je me sens toute seule") of this mainly musical song were sampled from a singer's message left on the answering machine of Laurent Boutonnat, a day that she seemed to be sad after seeing a depressing television show. As a result, the lyrics are not of a high quality. The music is mostly composed of noise of water drops.

The song was included on the Mylenium Tour, but in fact Farmer does not sing it on this occasion: Valérie Bony, one of the dancers, replaces her to give her the time to change her costume. "Mylène Is Calling" is featured only on the collector version of the best of Les Mots.

== Chart performances ==
In France, the single remained on the top 50 for a total of 17 weeks, eight of them in the top ten. It debuted at number 15 on 14 December 1991 and reached a peak at number three on 1 February 1992. The single sales were roughly equal to that of the previous single, "Regrets", but it was not certified by French certifier SNEP. In April 2018, the song was re-edited under new formats then re-entered the chart at number nine.

"Je t'aime mélancolie" entered the Belgian (Wallonia) chart at number 20 and reached a peak of number seven three weeks later, and eventually remained for a total of 15 weeks in the top 30. The song was also charted in Canada where it peaked at number 12, and achieved moderate success in Germany where it was only number 70 and remained on the chart for six weeks.

== Cover versions ==
The song was covered by Valli for a 1992 French compilation named 1992 - Les Plus Belles Chansons françaises. In 2003, Biba Binoche, a young woman who had participated in the European reality show Big Brother, and most known under the pseudonym BB, covered the song in various techno and electro version. She released "Je t'aime mélancolie" as single in Belgium and the latter had managed to appear on the Ultratop 40 Singles Chart for seven weeks in 2003, peaking at number 35. The song was available in three formats: CD single (electro radio edit, groove radio edit, trance radio edit), CD maxi (6 versions: electro radio remix, trance radio edit, electro extended mix, trance extended remix, Frank Trauner electro wave, funked lounge version, groove XL remix), and 12" maxi (5 versions: electro extended mix, Frank Trauner electro wave, funked lounge version, groove XL remix, trance extended version).

== Formats and track listings ==
These are the formats and track listings of single releases of "Je t'aime mélancolie":

- 7" single - France, Germany, Netherlands / CD single - Promo - Digipack - France / CD single - Promo - Luxurious pyramid - France/ Cassette - France (double length)

No.	Title	Length
1.	"Je t'aime mélancolie" (new radio remix)	4:20
2.	"Je t'aime mélancolie" (smooth mix)	4:15

- 12" maxi - France, Germany / 12" maxi - Netherlands

No.	Title	Length
1.	"Je t'aime mélancolie" (extended club remix)	7:44
2.	"Je t'aime mélancolie" (insane dance mix)	7:48

- CD maxi - France, Germany, Netherlands / CD maxi - Promo - Digipack - Canada

No.	Title	Length
1.	"Je t'aime mélancolie" (new radio remix)	4:26
2.	"Je t'aime mélancolie" (extended club remix)	7:45
3.	"Je t'aime mélancolie" (insane dance mix)	7:50
4.	"Mylène Is Calling" (only on the French CD maxi)	2:00

- Digital download

No.	Title	Length
1.	"Je t'aime mélancolie" (L'autre... version)	5:29
2.	"Je t'aime mélancolie" (Les Mots version)	4:40
3.	"Je t'aime mélancolie" (extended club remix)	7:45
4.	"Je t'aime mélancolie" (1996 live version)	5:20
5.	"Je t'aime mélancolie" (2006 live version)	4:53
6.	"Je t'aime mélancolie" (Felix Da Housecat remix)	4:45

- 12" maxi - France

No.	Title	Length
1.	"Je t'aime mélancolie" (Felix Da Housecat remix)	4:45

== Official versions ==
Version	Length	Album	Remixed by	Year	Comment
"Je t'aime mélancolie"
Album version	5:29	L'autre...	—	1991	See the previous sections
New radio remix	4:20	—	Laurent Boutonnat	1991	This version is shorter, faster and more dynamic, with a noise of an echo and sounds of wind instrument.
Smooth mix	4:15	—	Laurent Boutonnat	1991	The introduction is shorter.
Radio remix	4:16	—	Laurent Boutonnat	1991	This version is only available on the German promotional 7"-Single.
Radio remix 2	4:26	—	Laurent Boutonnat	1991	Released in Germany, this version has a longer bridge than the 'Radio Remix'.
Insane dance remix	7:50	—	Laurent Boutonnat	1991	The 1:30 introduction has dance sounds and contains only the words "Je t'aime mélancolie" repeated by Farmer. Then the voice of a man can be heard in the chorus and the numerous scratches. The song ends abruptly with a scratch.
Extended club remix	7:45	Dance Remixes	Laurent Boutonnat	1991	The song is punctuated by with phrase "Je t'aime, je t'aime, je t'aime mélancolie", sung by Farmer.
Music video	5:13	L'autre, Music Videos I	—	1991	
Live version (recorded in 1996)	5:20	Live à Bercy	—	1996	It is a rock version.
Radio remix 2 (album version)	4:40	Les Mots	Laurent Boutonnat	2001	The refrain and the musical bridge are longer than those in the 'Radio Remix 2'.
Felix Da Housecat remix	4:45	RemixeS	Felix Da Housecat	2003	This is a techno version in which the Farmer's voice is put forward. The expression "Et toc" is repeated many times.
Live version (recorded in 2006)	4:53 (audio); 4:47 (video)	Avant que l'ombre... à Bercy	—	2006	See Avant que l'ombre... à Bercy (tour)
"Mylène Is Calling"
Album version	2:13	Les Mots (long box edition)	—	1991	See the previous sections
Live version (recorded in 2000)	2:27	Mylenium Tour	—	2000	The words "Je me sens toute seule" are deleted. See Mylenium Tour

== Credits and personnel ==
These are the credits and the personnel as they appear on the back of the single:

- Mylène Farmer – lyrics
- Laurent Boutonnat – music
- Requiem Publishing – editions
- Polydor – recording company
- Marianne Rosensthiel – photo
- Henry Neu / Com'N.B – design

== Charts and sales ==
Chart (1991–1992)	Peak position
Australia (ARIA)	142
Belgian (Wallonia) Singles Chart	8
Canadian Singles Chart	12
Europe (European Hot 100)	18
French SNEP Singles Chart	3
German Singles Chart	70
Quebec (ADISQ)	11
Chart (2018)	Peak position
French SNEP Singles Chart	9

Country	Certification	Physical sales
France	Should be Silver	350,000
