= List of top 10 singles in 2011 (France) =

This is a list of singles that have peaked in the top 10 of the French Singles Chart in 2011. 59 singles were in the Top 10 this year, of which 14 were on the number-one spot.

== Top 10 singles ==
Artist(s)	Single	Peak	Peak date
Adam Lambert	"Whataya Want from Me"	7	14 January
Lady Gaga	"Born This Way"	2	11 February
Alexandra Stan	"Mr. Saxobeat"	6	18 February
Bruno Mars	"Grenade"	7	25 February
Rihanna	"S&M"	3	4 March
Inna	"Sun Is Up"	2	4 March
Colonel Reyel	"Celui..."	1	4 March
Colonel Reyel	"Toutes les nuits"	1	11 March
Les Enfoirés	"On demande pas la lune"	8	18 March
Jennifer Lopez featuring Pitbull	"On the Floor"	1	18 March
Diddy - Dirty Money featuring Skylar Grey	"Coming Home"	9	25 March
The Black Eyed Peas	"Just Can't Get Enough"	1	25 March
Justice	"Civilization"	5	1 April
Adele	"Rolling in the Deep"	3	1 April
Colonel Reyel	"Aurélie"	6	15 April
Magic System and Soprano	"Chérie Coco"	2	15 April
Mickaël Miro	"L'horloge tourne"	8	22 April
Mylène Farmer	"Bleu Noir"	1	22 April
Katy Perry featuring Kanye West	"E.T."	10	29 April
Jessie J featuring B.o.B	"Price Tag"	1	29 April
Keen'V	"J'aimerais trop"	3	6 May
Snoop Dogg vs. David Guetta	"Sweat"	1	6 May
Lady Gaga	"The Edge of Glory"	7	13 May
Britney Spears	"Till the World Ends"	8	20 May
Lady Gaga	"Judas"	7	20 May
LMFAO featuring Lauren Bennett and GoonRock	"Party Rock Anthem"	1	20 May
M. Pokora	"À nos actes manqués"	8	10 June
Pitbull featuring Ne-Yo, Afrojack and Nayer	"Give Me Everything"	2	10 June
Shakira featuring Pitbull	"Rabiosa"	6	17 June
The Black Eyed Peas	"Don't Stop the Party"	3	17 June
Loona	"Vamos a la playa"	4	24 June
Collectif Métissé	"Laisse tomber tes problèmes"	8	1 July
Mylène Farmer	"Lonely Lisa"	1	8 July
David Guetta featuring Flo Rida and Nicki Minaj	"Where Them Girls At"	4	15 July
Elisa Tovati and Tom Dice	"Il nous faut"	6	22 July
Rihanna	"Man Down"	1	29 July
Inna Modja	"French Cancan (Monsieur Sainte-Nitouche)"	4	5 August
David Guetta and Sia	"Titanium"	9	12 August
DJ Antoine vs Timati featuring Kalenna	"Welcome to St. Tropez"	7	26 August
Sean Paul featuring Alexis Jordan	"Got 2 Luv U"	4	26 August
Mika	"Elle me dit"	1	2 September
Britney Spears	"I Wanna Go"	5	9 September
David Guetta featuring Taio Cruz and Ludacris	"Little Bad Girl"	3	9 September
Maroon 5 featuring Christina Aguilera	"Moves like Jagger"	3	23 September
Pitbull featuring Marc Anthony	"Rain Over Me"	2	23 September
Rihanna featuring Calvin Harris	"We Found Love"	1	30 September
Adele	"Set Fire to the Rain"	10	7 October
Vanessa Paradis and -M-	"La Seine"	9	14 October
Moussier Tombola	"Logobitombo (Corde à sauter)"	5	14 October
Adele	"Someone like You"	1	14 October
David Guetta featuring Usher	"Without You"	6	28 October
Flo Rida	"Good Feeling"	3	4 November
Mylène Farmer	"Du temps"	8	11 November
Don Omar and Lucenzo	"Danza Kuduro"	4	11 November
Sean Paul	"She Doesn't Mind"	3	2 December
Coldplay	"Paradise"	5	9 December
Shakira	"Je l'aime à mourir"	1	9 December
Collectif Paris Africa	"Des ricochets"	6	16 December
LMFAO	"Sexy and I Know It"	3	30 December

== Entries by artists ==
The following table shows artists who achieved two or more top 10 entries in 2011. The figures include both main artists and featured artists and the peak position in brackets.

Entries	Artist	Songs
5	David Guetta	"Little Bad Girl" (3), "Sweat" (1), "Titanium" (9), "Where Them Girls At" (4), "Without You" (6)
4	Pitbull	"On the Floor" (1), "Give Me Everything" (2), "Rabiosa" (6), "Rain Over Me" (2)
3	Colonel Reyel	"Aurélie" (6), "Celui..." (1), "Toutes les nuits" (1),
3	Adele	"Rolling in the Deep" (3), "Set Fire to the Rain" (10), "Someone like You" (1)
3	Lady Gaga	"Born This Way" (2), "The Edge of Glory" (7), "Judas" (7)
3	Mylène Farmer	"Bleu Noir" (1), "Du temps" (8), "Lonely Lisa" (1)
3	Rihanna	"Man Down" (1), "S&M" (3), "We Found Love" (1)
2
2	The Black Eyed Peas	"Don't Stop the Party" (3), "Just Can't Get Enough" (1)
2	LMFAO	"Party Rock Anthem" (1), "Sexy and I Know It" (3)
2	Shakira	"Je l'aime à mourir" (1), "Rabiosa" (6)
2	Sean Paul	"Got 2 Luv U" (4), "She Doesn't Mind" (3)
2	Britney Spears	"I Wanna Go" (5), "Till the World Ends" (8)

== See also ==
- 2011 in music
- List of number-one hits of 2011 (France)
- List of top 100 singles of 2011 (France)
