= List of top 100 singles of 2011 (France) =

This is the list of the 100 best-selling singles of 2011 in France. Rankings are based on the combined sales of physical and digital singles.

== Top 100 singles ==
Pos.	Artist(s)	Single
1	LMFAO featuring Lauren Bennett and GoonRock	"Party Rock Anthem"
2	Adele	"Rolling in the Deep"
3	Israel Kamakawiwo'ole	"Over the Rainbow"
4	Adele	"Someone like You"
5	The Black Eyed Peas	"Just Can't Get Enough"
6	Jennifer Lopez featuring Pitbull	"On the Floor"
7	Pitbull featuring Ne-Yo, Afrojack and Nayer	"Give Me Everything"
8	Mika	"Elle me dit"
9	Rihanna	"Man Down"
10	Snoop Dogg vs. David Guetta	"Sweat"
11	Colonel Reyel	"Celui"
12	Magic System featuring Soprano	"Chérie Coco"
13	Rihanna featuring Calvin Harris	"We Found Love"
14	Rihanna	"S&M"
15	Jessie J featuring B.o.B	"Price Tag"
16	Inna	"Sun Is Up"
17	The Black Eyed Peas	"The Time (Dirty Bit)"
18	Keen'V	"J'aimerais trop"
19	The Black Eyed Peas	"Don't Stop the Party"
20	David Guetta featuring Rihanna	"Who's That Chick?"
21	David Guetta featuring Flo Rida and Nicki Minaj	"Where Them Girls At"
22	Lady Gaga	"Born This Way"
23	Loona	"Vamos a la playa"
24	Pitbull featuring Marc Anthony	"Rain Over Me"
25	Moussier Tombola	"Logobitombo"
26	Elisa Tovati and Tom Dice	"Il nous faut"
27	Britney Spears	"Till the World Ends"
28	Shakira featuring Dizzee Rascal or El Cata	"Loca"
29	Alexandra Stan	"Mr. Saxobeat"
30	Shakira featuring Pitbull or El Cata	"Rabiosa"
31	Flo Rida	"Good Feeling"
32	M. Pokora	"À nos actes manqués"
33	Maroon 5 featuring Christina Aguilera	"Moves like Jagger"
34	Inna Modja	"French Cancan"
35	Mickaël Miro	"L'horloge tourne"
36	Lucenzo featuring Don Omar	"Danza Kuduro"
37	Bruno Mars	"Grenade"
38	Colonel Reyel	"Toutes les nuits"
39	Sean Paul featuring Alexis Jordan	"Got 2 Luv U"
40	Diddy-Diddy-Dirty Money featuring Skylar Grey	"Coming Home"
41	Katy Perry	"Firework"
42	LMFAO	"Sexy and I Know It"
43	DJ Antoine featuring Timati and Kalenna	"Welcome to St. Tropez"
44	Shakira featuring Freshlyground	"Waka Waka (This Time for Africa)"
45	Britney Spears	"I Wanna Go"
46	David Guetta featuring Usher	"Without You"
47	David Guetta featuring Taio Cruz and Ludacris	"Little Bad Girl"
48	Lady Gaga	"Judas"
49	Magic System	"Ambiance à l'africaine"
50	Coldplay	"Paradise"
51	Adele	"Set Fire to the Rain"
52	Collectif Métissé	"Laisse tomber tes problèmes"
53	Colonel Reyel	"Aurélie"
54	David Guetta featuring Sia	"Titanium"
55	Katy Perry featuring Kanye West	"E.T."
56	Taio Cruz featuring Kylie Minogue	"Higher"
57	Bruno Mars	"The Lazy Song"
58	Martin Solveig featuring Dragonette	"Hello"
59	Sean Paul	"She Doesn't Mind"
60	LMFAO featuring Natalia Kills	"Champagne Showers"
61	Rihanna	"Only Girl (In the World)"
62	Guillaume Grand	"Toi et moi"
63	Simple Plan featuring Marie-Mai	"Jet Lag"
64	The Black Eyed Peas	"I Gotta Feeling"
65	Shy'm	"Prendre l'air"
66	Selah Sue	"Raggamuffin"
67	Sexion d'Assaut	"Qui t'a dit"
68	Usher	"More"
69	Sak Noel	"Loca People"
70	Alexandra Stan	"Get Back (ASAP)"
71	DJ Abdel and Mister You	"Funk You"
72	Ben l'Oncle Soul	"Soulman"
73	Beyoncé	"Run the World (Girls)"
74	Pitbull featuring T-Pain	"Hey Baby (Drop It to the Floor)"
75	Duck Sauce	"Barbra Streisand"
76	La Fouine	"Papa"
77	Mylène Farmer	"Oui mais... non"
78	Vanessa Paradis and -M-	"La Seine"
79	Bob Sinclar featuring Raffaella Carrà	"Far l'amore"
80	Zaz	"La fée"
81	Katy Perry	"Last Friday Night (T.G.I.F.)"
82	Stromae	"Alors on danse"
83	The Black Eyed Peas	"Whenever"
84	Sexion d'Assaut	"Paris va bien"
85	Rihanna featuring Drake	"What's My Name"
86	Gary Fico and Léo Rispal	"Le même que moi"
87	Lady Gaga	"The Edge of Glory"
88	Mylène Farmer	"Lonely Lisa"
89	Jason Derülo	"Don't Wanna Go Home"
90	Pink	"Fuckin' Perfect"
91	Zaz	"Je veux"
92	Shakira	"Je l'aime à mourir"
93	Keen'V	"Prince charmant"
94	Cobra Starship featuring Sabi	"You Make Me Feel..."
95	Nadia Ali	"Rapture"
96	Les Enfoirés	"On demande pas la lune"
97	Bad Meets Evil featuring Bruno Mars	"Lighters"
98	TLF and Corneille	"Le meilleur du monde"
99	Jay-Z featuring Alicia Keys	"Empire State of Mind"
100	Martin Solveig featuring Kele	"Ready 2 Go"

== See also ==
- 2011 in music
- List of number-one hits of 2011 (France)
- List of top 10 singles in 2011 (France)
