= Logobi (disambiguation) =

Logobi (also written Logobie) may refer to:

- Logobi, an urban musical genre originating from Africa
- Logobi GT, French musical group of logobi music
- "Logobitombo", also known as "Logobitombo (Corde à sauter)", a song by Moussier Tombola
