= Florent Amodio =

French figure skater

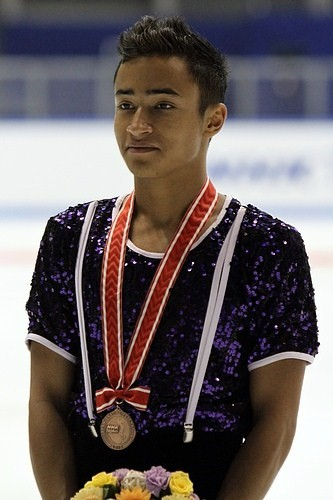
- Amodio at the 2010 NHK Trophy

Personal information
- Born: 12 May 1990 (age 36) Sobral, Brazil
- Home town: Paris, France
- Height: 1.65 m (5 ft 5 in)

Figure skating career
- Country: France
- Discipline: Men's singles
- Began skating: 1994
- Retired: 28 January 2016

Medal record
European Championships
Gold medal – first place	2011 Bern	Singles
Silver medal – second place	2013 Zagreb	Singles
Bronze medal – third place	2012 Sheffield	Singles
French Championships
Gold medal – first place	2010 Marseille	Singles
Gold medal – first place	2013 Strasbourg	Singles
Gold medal – first place	2014 Vaujany	Singles
Gold medal – first place	2015 Magève	Singles
Silver medal – second place	2009 Colmar	Singles
Silver medal – second place	2011 Tours	Singles
Silver medal – second place	2012 Dammarie-les-Lys	Singles
Silver medal – second place	2016 Épinal	Singles
Junior Grand Prix Final
Gold medal – first place	2008–09 Goyang	Singles

Florent Amodio (born 12 May 1990) is a French figure skating coach and former competitor. He is the 2011 European champion, a four-time French national champion (2010, 2013–15), and the 2008 JGP Final champion. He has represented France at two Winter Olympics.

== Personal life ==
Florent Amodio was born in Sobral, Ceará, Brazil. A French couple adopted him as an infant, along with his sister. He was raised in Fremainville, Val-d'Oise. He holds both French and Brazilian citizenship.

In addition to competing, Amodio has studied for a coaching diploma. In 2012, he took on a starring role in the movie Programme Libre, in which he portrays a teenaged skater named Gauthier. Amodio intends to study journalism and pursue a career in that field.

In September 2020, Amodio married his girlfriend, Sofia Gassoumi, who also coaches at his rink.

== Career ==
=== Early years ===
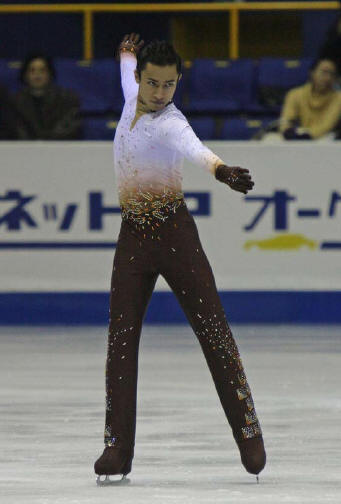
Amodio at the 2008-9 Junior Grand Prix Final

Amodio began skating at the age of four and was coached by Bernard Glesser for more than fifteen years. At the age of 12, he was diagnosed with Osgood-Schlatter disease, causing knee pain and edema. It left him unable to skate for 18 months. He returned to competition in 2004 and first represented France internationally in 2005.

After finishing third and first at his 2008–09 JGP events, Amodio won the 2008–2009 ISU Junior Grand Prix Final in his fourth and final season on the circuit. He later had a disappointing 15th place showing at Junior Worlds. Amodio was part of the French team that competed at the inaugural World Team Trophy in April 2009, and finished 10th in the men's field.

=== 2009–2010 season: Senior debut ===
Amodio turned senior prior to the 2009–10 season, which he began by winning the French Masters. He later made his senior Grand Prix debut at the 2009 Cup of Russia, where he placed 9th, and came in 4th at the 2009 Skate America, missing out on a medal by less than a point. Amodio won the French national title in December 2009 and was selected for the Olympic and World team. He finished 12th at the Vancouver Olympics and was 15th at his first senior Worlds.

In May 2010 Amodio made a coaching change, leaving Bernard Glesser, who had trained him since childhood, to work with Nikolai Morozov in Russia and Latvia. When in France, he trained with Annick Dumont in Champigny-sur-Marne.

=== 2010–2011 season ===
Amodio won the bronze medal at the 2010 NHK Trophy – his first senior Grand Prix medal. At the 2010 Trophée Eric Bompard, he won the silver medal with a career-best score. Based on these results, Amodio's was the sixth and final qualifier for the Grand Prix Final. He finished in sixth place in the short program and fifth in the free skate to place sixth overall at the Final. At the 2011 French Nationals he had a disappointing short program but moved up to win silver behind Brian Joubert after a strong showing in the free skate.

Amodio had a strong short program at the 2011 European Championships and placed first in this part of the competition. He was third in the free program and finished with a combined total of 226.86 points, 3.85 ahead of Joubert, to win gold in his European debut. It was the first time since 1961 that the French took the top two spots in the European men's event.{ At the 2011 World Championships, Amodio was fifth after the short program, but dropped to seventh after the free skate. He performed his free skate to music with lyrics, which are not allowed in competition except in ice dance, explaining that it "turned the performance even more into a party". There were reports that Amodio would train only part-time with Morozov in 2011–2012, due to Russia not wanting foreign skaters to use Russian-funded coaches and facilities in the run-up to the Sochi Olympics, but Morozov rejected the reports. In the off-season, Amodio skated in shows in Korea, saying that it was a good source of income: "Finally, I could start making a living with what I loved! Wasn't that just beautiful?" Amodio and Morozov stated that they intended to continue testing the system by using music with words.

=== 2011–2012 season ===
Amodio continued working with Morozov, as well as Dumont whenever he was in France. He also worked with Alexei Yagudin on quad toes in the U.S. He won the 2011 French Masters event in October. In the 2011–12 Grand Prix season, Amodio finished 9th at his first event, the 2011 Skate America. He said it was a turning point for him and he was glad it happened. He was fifth at 2011 Trophée Eric Bompard. He announced that he would return to training with former coach Bernard Glesser when he was in France, and spent the time after the Grand Prix Series reworking his programs. In December, Amodio competed at the 2012 French Championships with a new short program to music from the film Tears of the Sun and a reworked free program. He placed 2nd after injuring his back during the free program.

Amodio then competed at the 2012 European Championships and won the bronze medal. At the World Championships in Nice, he placed 6th after the short program, and rose to finish 5th overall with a free skate score of 163.07. His placement combined with Brian Joubert's 4th-place finish earned France three spots in the men's competition for 2013.

=== 2012–2013 season ===
In the 2012–13 Grand Prix season, Amodio was assigned to 2012 Skate Canada International and 2012 Trophée Eric Bompard, finishing 4th and 2nd. At Trophée Eric Bompard he announced that he would drop his Farracus short program and replace it with his reworked free program from the previous season. He won his second national title at the 2013 French Championships in December.

At the 2013 European Championships, Amodio led after the short program with a personal best score of 89.82. In the free program, he landed two quads for the first time in his career and was awarded the silver medal. After the event, he skated in twelve shows in two weeks as part of the Art on Ice tour in Switzerland, Finland, and Sweden. During the tour, he developed a back injury and severely strained muscles. Amodio finished 12th at the 2013 World Championships in London, Ontario, Canada.

=== 2013–2014 season ===
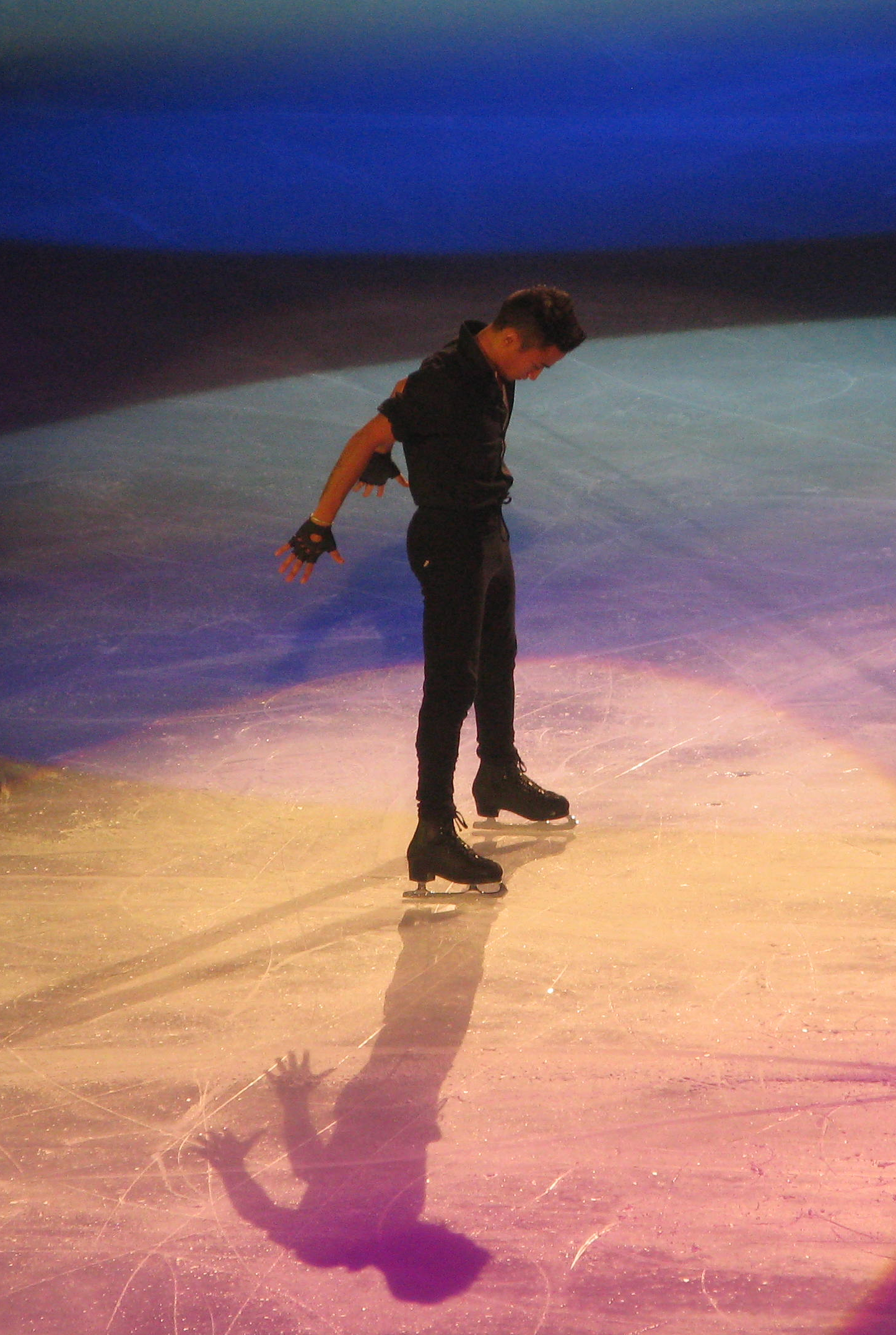
Florent Amodio at Bompard 2013.

In June 2013, Amodio flew to Palm Springs, California for a month of training with Morozov but a few days later returned to France and trained for two weeks without a coach. On 23 July 2013, he confirmed the end of his collaboration with Morozov and that he was training in Paris with Katia Krier as a temporary arrangement. On 13 September 2013, it was announced that Amodio would remain at Paris-Bercy, with Krier and Shanetta Folle as his coaches. Amodio stated, "[T]hey coach me in an almost military way. You know, I am rather foolish at times and still a little bit of an artist. I need to be given some limits." On costumes, Amodio said "They're there simply to accompany the music. [...] What counts most is the work on the skates. And I have to be comfortable."

Amodio finished sixth and seventh at his two Grand Prix event assignments, the 2013 Cup of China and the 2013 Trophée Eric Bompard. After winning his fourth national title, he competed at the 2014 European Championships. At the event in Budapest, Hungary, he ranked seventh in the short program and 20th in the free skate, finishing 13th overall and the lowest-placed of the three French men. Amodio's next competition was the 2014 Winter Olympics in Sochi, Russia. He came in 18th overall after placing 14th in the short and 18th in the free skate. He elected not to compete at the 2014 World Championships in Saitama, Japan, citing his lack of form.

=== 2014–2015 season ===
For the 2014–15 Grand Prix season, Amodio was assigned to the 2014 Skate Canada International, where he finished 6th, and the Trophée Éric Bompard, where he finished 11th after a difficult free skate. Amodio made a mid-season coaching change, and at the suggestion of his coach Bernard Glesser, he moved Bercy to work with Claude Péri. He successfully defended his national title and was assigned to the 2015 Europeans and 2015 World. He finished ninth at both events, with a season's best score at the World Championships.

=== 2015–2016 season ===
For the 2015–16 Grand Prix season, Amodio was assigned to Skate America and the Trophée Eric Bompard. He finished 11th at Skate America and withdrew from the Trophée Eric Bompard due to an injury. On 19 November 2015 Amodio announced that he would retire from competitive skating after the 2016 Europeans. Amodio was 8th in the short program and 2nd in the free skate to finish 4th overall at the Europeans, his best showing since 2013. Following the event, he confirmed his intention to retire from competitive skating, stating that he was proud of the impression he left in skating.

== Post-competitive career ==
In April 2018, Amodio opened the Amodio Figure Skating Academy in Vaujany.

As a coach, his current and former students include:

- (France) Luc Economides
- (Czech Republic) Petr Kotlarik
- (Poland) Ekaterina Kurakova
- (France) Maïa Mazzara
- (United Kingdom) Jedidiah Lincoln
- (United States) Daniel Martynov
- (France) Milana Mozeiko
- (France) François Pitot
- (United Kingdom) Kristen Spours

Additionally, Amodio has also choreographed for several figure skaters. His clients have included:

- (Australia) Brendan Kerry
- (Czech Republic) Petr Kotlarik
- (Estonia) Arlet Levandi
- (Chile) Yae-Mia Neira
- (Slovakia) Vanesa Šelmeková

== Programs ==
Season	Short program	Free skating	Exhibition
2015–2016	Happy by Pharrell Williams	Memories of Sobral by Sébastien Damiani; Rio (film) by Sérgio Mendes; Winston Churchill's Boy; Nemesis by Benjamin Clementine	Memories of Sobral by Sébastien Damiani; Eu Quero Tchu, Eu Quero Tcha by João Lucas & Marcelo; Balada by Gusttavo Lima
2014–2015	Le Concert by Armand Amar	Blood Diamond by James Newton Howard; The Lioness Hunt (from The Lion King)	Say Something by A Great Big World
2013–2014	La cumparsita arranged by Sebastien Damiani, F. Larage choreo. by Stephane Lambiel	Under The Moon by Sebastien Damiani, F. Larage; Happy by C2C; La Vie en rose performed by Louis Armstrong	Memories of Sobral by Sébastien Damiani; Eu Quero Tchu, Eu Quero Tcha by João Lucas & Marcelo; Balada by Gusttavo Lima
2012–2013	Memories of Sobral by Sébastien Damiani; Rio (film) by Sérgio Mendes; Farrucas by Pepe Romero	Jumpin' Jack by Sébastien Damiani; Broken Sorrow by Nuttin' But Stringz; To Build a Home by The Cinematic Orchestra both arranged by Sébastien Damiani	Memories of Sobral by Sébastien Damiani; Eu Quero Tchu, Eu Quero Tcha by João Lucas & Marcelo; Balada by Gusttavo Lima
2011–2012	Tears of the Sun by Hans Zimmer; Summertime by George Gershwin; Jumpin Jack by Big Bad Voodoo Daddy	Memories of Sobral by Sébastien Damiani; Rio (film) by Sérgio Mendes; Bésame Mucho by Perez Prado; Rio (film) by Sérgio Mendes	Mess Around by Ray Charles
2010–2011	Once Upon a Time in Mexico by Robert Rodriguez	Broken by Lisa Gerrard; Apologize by OneRepublic; Imma Be by Black Eyed Peas; Smooth Criminal performed by David Garrett; Don't Stop 'Til You Get Enough by Michael Jackson	
2009–2010	Munich by John Williams; Papa Can You Hear Me? (from Yentl)	Amélie by Yann Tiersen; Nocturne No 20 by Frédéric Chopin arranged by Re: Mind Orchestra; Carrousel (from Cirque du Soleil) by Benoît Jutras; Amélie Poulain by Smoku (hip hop remix)	She's Out of My Life; Black or White by Michael Jackson
2008–2009	The Mask of Zorro by James Horner; Malaguena by Ernesto Lecuona; Baghdad by J. Cook choreo. by Bernard Glesser	The Mission by Ennio Morricone; Rockin Gysies by Willi and Lobo; Bullfighter's Dream by Ottmar Liebert choreo. by Bernard Glesser	
2007–2008	Somewhere in Time by John Barry; Rhapsody on a Theme of Paganini Sergei Rachmaninoff	The Mask of Zorro by James Horner	
2006–2007	Schindler's List by John Williams	The Mask of Zorro by James Horner	
2005–2006	Schindler's List by John Williams	Lord of the Dance by Ronan Hardiman; The Last of the Mohicans by Trevor Jones and Randy Edelmann	
2004–2005	Schindler's List by John Williams	The Jungle Book	

== Competitive highlights ==
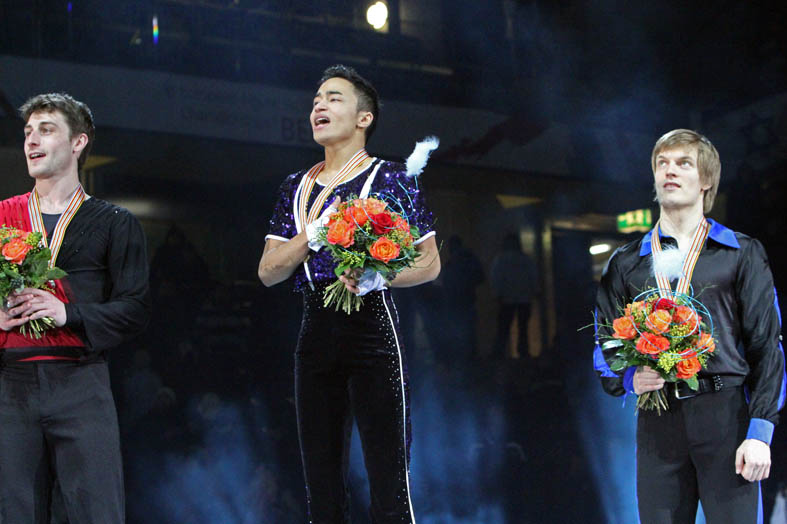
Amodio and his fellow medalists at the 2011 Europeans

- GP – Event of the ISU Grand Prix Series
- JGP – Event of the ISU Junior Grand Prix Series
- CS – Event of the ISU Challenger Series
- WD – Withdrew from competition
- Medals at team events are awarded for the team results only. Individual placements at team events are listed in parentheses.

Competition placements at senior level
Season	2008–09	2009–10	2010–11	2011–12	2012–13	2013–14	2014–15	2015–16	2016–17
Winter Olympics		12th				18th			
Winter Olympics (Team event)						6th			
World Championships		15th	7th	5th	12th		9th		
European Championships			1st	3rd	2nd	13th	9th	4th	
Grand Prix Final			6th						
French Championships	2nd	1st	2nd	2nd	1st	1st	1st	2nd	
World Team Trophy	4th (10th)			4th (4th)			6th (10th)		
GP Cup of China						6th			
GP Cup of Russia		9th							
GP NHK Trophy			3rd						
GP Skate America		4th		9th				11th	
GP Skate Canada					4th		6th		
GP Trophée Éric Bompard			2nd	5th	3rd	7th	11th		
CS Lombardia Trophy							7th		
CS Nebelhorn Trophy								4th	
Challenge Cup				WD					
Japan Open				2nd (5th)					2nd (6th)
Master's de Patinage		1st	2nd	1st	1st	1st	2nd	3rd	

Competition placements at junior level
Season	2004–05	2005–06	2006–07	2007–08	2008–09
World Junior Championships			15th	10th	15th
Junior Grand Prix Final					1st
French Championships (Senior)		11th	7th	4th	
French Championships (Junior)	4th	4th	2nd	1st	1st
JGP Andorra		11th			
JGP Czech Republic			12th		
JGP Estonia				7th	
JGP France			4th		3rd
JGP Great Britain					1st
JGP Poland		15th			
JGP United States				5th	
Master's de Patinage		3rd	2nd	2nd	1st
