= Flavel & Neto =

French musical duo

- Origin: French duo with Brazilian and Cape Verde origins
- Genres: Kizomba, dance music with various Latin and African influences
- Years active: 2012–present
- Labels: Five Music Records
- Members: Flavel; Neto (Neto Furtado)
- Website: www.flaveletneto.com

Flavel & Neto are a singing duo based in France specializing in Latin-based dance music, but greatly influenced by Angolan kizomba music. They are signed to Five Music label and are mostly famous with their singles "Eu quero tchu, eu quero tcha" and "Pedida perfeita (Tararatata)", the latter featuring Anna Torres.

== Career ==
Flavel (born c. 1993) is a Brazilian singer residing in France. Passionate about music and soccer, he developed his singing skills early inspired by zouk, R'n'B and very notably by kizomba, a genre of music originating in Angola and very popular with French Cape Verdean community. Neto Furtado (born c. 1992) coming from an immigrant family to France originating from Cape Verde was a childhood friend of Flavel. Neto had been heavily influenced by samba and kizomba and had started writing songs at age 13.

The duo's interest in kizomba and dance music caught the attention of Akad, a producer with Five Music label that already was producing African-French acts, notably Logobi GT, one of the biggest acts in logobi music. Akad signed Flavel & Neto to the label and produced the song "Eu quero tchu, eu quero tcha" for the duo. The song was already popular in a version by Brazilian Música sertaneja duo João Lucas e Marcelo, with the Brazilian footballer (soccer player) Neymar featured in a cameo appearance in the music video dancing to its tune... Neymar had a hand in popularizing Michel Telo's "Ai se eu te pego!" and Gusttavo Lima's "Balada" earlier with notable public performances of those songs. João Lucas e Marcelo single eventually reached the top of the charts in Brazil. The Flavel & Neto version of the song, became their first official release in July 2012. It found almost immediate success in French and European dance venues. It also gained favor with zumba aerobic dance clubs throughout France. Such clubs had been instrumental in promoting many Latin-based tunes throughout Europe.

Flavel & Neto follow up single was "Pedida perfeita (Tararatata)" released in February 2013 featuring the Brazilian female singer Anna Torres. The release proved to be an even bigger commercial success for the duo. What accentuated its success was that Flavel & Neto, in addition to the Portuguese version, quickly released a bilingual French/Portuguese one for the French markets. The song composed by Cássio Sampaio charted in the SNEP official French Singles Chart reaching number 19 in the chart with heavy rotation on dance-based radio stations in the country. Other versions popularizing the song were by Gabriela Moraes and by Maykow & Mandioca.

== Discography ==
=== Albums ===
Year	Album	Peak positions	
Year	Album	FR	BEL (Wa)
2013	So um tempo	156	–

=== Singles ===
Year	Single	Peak positions			Album
Year	Single	FR	BEL (Wa) Ultratop	BEL (Wa) Ultratip*	Album
2012	"Eu quero tchu, eu quero tcha"	55	–	–	So um tempo
2013	"Pedida Perfeita (Tararatata)" (Flavel & Neto featuring Anna Torres)	18	–	11	So um tempo
2013	"Emmène-moi" (Flavel & Neto feat. Sylja "La GT")	–	–	–	So um tempo
2014	"Vai dançar" (feat. Speed)	192	–	–	So um tempo
2014	"Bam Bam Bam"	–	–	–	Non-album release
2014	"Bye Bye"	–	–	–	Non-album release
2015	"La vie est belle"	–	–	–	Non-album release

*Did not appear in the official Belgian Ultratop 50 charts, but rather in the bubbling under Ultratip charts.

== Discography:Flavel Romero ==
- 2017: "Atchu tchutcha" (feat. Logobi GT)
