= Emmène-moi =

Emmène-moi may refer to:

- Emmène-moi (film), 1995 film by Michel Spinosa
- Emmène-moi (album), 1998 album by Allan Théo
  - "Emmène-moi", 1998 single by Allan Théo, title track from the album
- "Emmène-moi" (Marilou song), 2007 song by Marilou from her self-titled album Marilou
- "Emmène-moi" (Marie-Mai song), 2007 song by arie-Mai from her album Dangereuse Attraction
- "Emmène-moi" (Flavel & Neto song), 2013 single by Flavel & Neto featuring Sylja "La GT" from the 2013 album So um tempo
