= So um tempo =

Studio album by Flavel & Neto
- Released: 28 June 2013
- Recorded: 2012–2013
- Genre: Dance music
- Label: Jive Epic (Sony Music)

Singles from So um tempo
- 1. "Eu Quero Tchu, Eu Quero Tcha" Released: 23 July 2012; 2. "Pedida Perfeita (Tararatata)" (feat. Anna Torres)" Released: 11 February 2013; 3. "Emmène-moi" (feat. Sylja "La GT")" Released: August 2013

So um tempo is the debut album by the French-based Brazilian/Cape Verde duo Flavel & Neto. It was released on 28 June 2013 on Jive Epic, an affiliate of Sony Music. In France it was released by Sony Music.

The album contains the two major hits of Flavel & Neto, namely their version of "Eu Quero Tchu, Eu Quero Tcha" and both Portuguese and French versions of Pedida Perfeita (Tararatata)". The album stayed three weeks in SNEP, the official French Albums Chart peaking at number 156. It also reached number 56 on French iTunes Chart in downloads.

== Track listing ==
1. "Eu quero tchu, eu quero tcha" (3:07)
2. "Emmène-moi" (feat. Sylja "La GT") (3:34)
3. "Da so um tempo" (3:38)
4. "Tele-novela" (3:30)
5. "Le soleir donne" (3:44)
6. "Oh princess" (2:46)
7. "Laisse tomber les filles" (3:30)
8. "Vai dançar" (feat. Speed) (3:21)
9. Pedida perfeita (Tararatata)" (Version portugaise) (feat. Anna Torres (2:52)
10. "Bomba" (3:22)
11. "Toca na mao" (3:25)
12. Pedida perfeita (Tararatata)" (Version française) (feat. Anna Torres (2:52)

== Charts ==
Chart (2013)	Peak position
SNEP French Singles Chart	156
