= Funknejo =

Fusion genre of funk carioca and sertanejo

- Etymology: Funk + sertanejo
- Stylistic origins: Funk carioca; sertanejo; sertanejo universitário
- Cultural origins: Early to mid-2010s, Brazil

Other topics
- Agronejo; trapnejo; funk ostentação; funk ousadia; funk melody

Funknejo (Brazilian Portuguese pronunciation: [fɐ̃kiˈneʒu]) is a fusion genre of Brazilian popular music combining elements of funk carioca and sertanejo music.

== Characteristics ==
Funknejo combines rhythmic and production elements derived from funk carioca with melodic and instrumental features associated with sertanejo universitário. It is commonly used electronic beats such as the tamborzão alongside accordion, acoustic guitar, and synthesizers. Within the genre, lyrics commonly emphasize celebration, nightlife, and personal achievement. Vocals often alternate between melodic singing characteristic of sertanejo and the spoken or rhythmic delivery associated with funk MCs.

== History ==
Although the term funknejo emerged during the 2010s, journalists have identified earlier musical connections between sertanejo and funk carioca. In 1969, the sertanejo duo Léo Canhoto & Robertinho released "Jack, O Matador", a song incorporating dialogue inspired by Western films. During the 1990s, funk production teams including Equipe Pipo's and DJ Mamut sampled the recording in funk montages, creating an early intersection between the two musical traditions.

Funk carioca itself developed through the incorporation of diverse musical influences. Originating from Miami bass and electronic dance music (EDM) during the late 1980s, the genre later incorporated elements from other Brazilian styles, including frevo and samba. The use of accordion in funk recordings, which later became associated with funknejo, appeared in "Gaiteiro 96", released in 1996 by DJ Marlboro and DJ Pepe. The recording also sampled material by Léo Canhoto & Robertinho.

In 2011, singer-songwriter Michel Teló recorded a sertanejo version of "Ai Se Eu Te Pego", a song whose earlier version incorporated elements of funk before being adapted into forró. Teló's recording achieved international commercial success. In 2012, the duo João Lucas & Marcelo released "Eu Quero Tchu, Eu Quero Tcha", which became one of the first commercially successful recordings to combine sertanejo universitário with the rhythmic characteristics of funk. The song is frequently identified as a milestone in the popularization of the term funknejo. During the same period, sertanejo artists also adopted the practice of recording response songs, a format already established in funk. One example was Naiara Azevedo's "Coitado", released as a response to "Sou Foda" by Os Avassaladores.
