= List of number-one singles of 2011 (France) =

This is a list of the French SNEP Top 100 Singles & Top 200 Albums number-ones of 2011.

== Number ones by week ==
=== Singles chart ===
Week	Issue date	Physical singles			Digital singles		
Week	Issue date	Artist	Title	Sales	Artist	Title	Sales
1	2 January	Israel "IZ" Kamakawiwo'ole	"Over the Rainbow"		The Black Eyed Peas	"The Time (Dirty Bit)"	14,003
2	9 January	Israel "IZ" Kamakawiwo'ole	"Over the Rainbow"	5,600	Israel "IZ" Kamakawiwo'ole	"Over the Rainbow"	19,224
3	16 January	Israel "IZ" Kamakawiwo'ole	"Over the Rainbow"	7,900	Israel "IZ" Kamakawiwo'ole	"Over the Rainbow"	18,400
4	23 January	Israel "IZ" Kamakawiwo'ole	"Over the Rainbow"	7,500	Israel "IZ" Kamakawiwo'ole	"Over the Rainbow"	18,600

From the chart edition of 30 January, digital and physical sales have been merged into a sole chart.

Physical + digital chart
Week	Issue date				
Week	Issue date	Artist	Title	Sales	Ref.
4	30 January	Israel "IZ" Kamakawiwo'ole	"Over the Rainbow"	25,892	
5	6 February	Israel "IZ" Kamakawiwo'ole	"Over the Rainbow"	25,927	
6	13 February	Israel "IZ" Kamakawiwo'ole	"Over the Rainbow"	20,599	
7	20 February	Israel "IZ" Kamakawiwo'ole	"Over the Rainbow"	17,113	
8	27 February	Israel "IZ" Kamakawiwo'ole	"Over the Rainbow"	12,971	
9	6 March	Colonel Reyel	"Celui..."	10,402	
10	13 March	Colonel Reyel	"Toutes les nuits"	12,364	
11	20 March	Jennifer Lopez featuring Pitbull	"On the Floor"	12,496	
12	27 March	The Black Eyed Peas	"Just Can't Get Enough"	11,948	
13	3 April	The Black Eyed Peas	"Just Can't Get Enough"	11,358	
14	10 April	The Black Eyed Peas	"Just Can't Get Enough"	12,535	
15	17 April	The Black Eyed Peas	"Just Can't Get Enough"	12,148	
16	24 April	Mylène Farmer	"Bleu Noir"	10,770	
17	1 May	Jessie J featuring B.o.B	"Price Tag"	10,305	
18	8 May	Snoop Dogg vs. David Guetta	"Sweat"	10,161	
19	15 May	Snoop Dogg vs. David Guetta	"Sweat"	9,884	
20	22 May	LMFAO featuring Lauren Bennett and GoonRock	"Party Rock Anthem"	11,413	
21	29 May	LMFAO featuring Lauren Bennett and GoonRock	"Party Rock Anthem"	12,751	
22	5 June	LMFAO featuring Lauren Bennett and GoonRock	"Party Rock Anthem"	14,208	
23	12 June	LMFAO featuring Lauren Bennett and GoonRock	"Party Rock Anthem"	13,984	
24	19 June	LMFAO featuring Lauren Bennett and GoonRock	"Party Rock Anthem"	15,075	
25	26 June	LMFAO featuring Lauren Bennett and GoonRock	"Party Rock Anthem"	15,562	
26	3 July	LMFAO featuring Lauren Bennett and GoonRock	"Party Rock Anthem"	15,808	
27	10 July	Mylène Farmer	"Lonely Lisa"	15,222	
28	17 July	LMFAO featuring Lauren Bennett and GoonRock	"Party Rock Anthem"	13,121	
29	24 July	LMFAO featuring Lauren Bennett and GoonRock	"Party Rock Anthem"	10,799	
30	31 July	Rihanna	"Man Down"	12,051	
31	7 August	Rihanna	"Man Down"	11,812	
32	14 August	Rihanna	"Man Down"	10,938	
33	21 August	Rihanna	"Man Down"	8,467	
34	28 August	Rihanna	"Man Down"	8,746	
35	4 September	Mika	"Elle me dit"	10,466	
36	11 September	Mika	"Elle me dit"	10,647	
37	18 September	Mika	"Elle me dit"	10,786	
38	25 September	Mika	"Elle me dit"	9,872	
39	2 October	Rihanna featuring Calvin Harris	"We Found Love"	8,712	
40	9 October	Mika	"Elle me dit"	13,523	
41	16 October	Adele	"Someone like You"	10,445	
42	23 October	Rihanna featuring Calvin Harris	"We Found Love"	11,083	
43	30 October	Rihanna featuring Calvin Harris	"We Found Love"	14,108	
44	6 November	Rihanna featuring Calvin Harris	"We Found Love"	14,537	
45	13 November	Rihanna featuring Calvin Harris	"We Found Love"	12,457	
46	20 November	Adele	"Someone like You"	12,610	
47	27 November	Adele	"Someone like You"	13,313	
48	4 December	Adele	"Someone like You"	12,208	
49	11 December	Shakira	"Je l'aime à mourir"	11,958	
50	18 December	Shakira	"Je l'aime à mourir"	10,358	
51	25 December	Shakira	"Je l'aime à mourir"	9,862	
52	1 January	Shakira	"Je l'aime à mourir"	9,928	

=== Albums chart ===
Week	Issue date	Physical albums			Digital albums		
Week	Issue date	Artist	Title	Sales	Artist	Title	Sales
1	2 January	Les Prêtres Compilation	Spiritus Dei NRJ Music Awards 2011	23,212 36,035	Compilation	NRJ Music Awards 2011	2,269
2	9 January	Nolwenn Leroy Compilation	Bretonne NRJ Music Awards 2011	15,741 26,036	Compilation	NRJ Music Awards 2011	1,585
3	16 January	Nolwenn Leroy	Bretonne	21,244	Nolwenn Leroy	Bretonne	1,604
4	23 January	Nolwenn Leroy	Bretonne	31,356	Compilation	NRJ Music Awards 2011	1,864

From the chart edition of 30 January, digital and physical sales and compilations have been merged into a sole chart.

Physical + digital chart
Week	Issue date				
Week	Issue date	Artist	Title	Sales	Ref.
4	30 January	Nolwenn Leroy	Bretonne	28,587	
5	6 February	Nolwenn Leroy	Bretonne	24,100	
6	13 February	Nolwenn Leroy	Bretonne	22,829	
7	20 February	La Fouine	La Fouine vs. Laouni	25,621	
8	27 February	Nolwenn Leroy	Bretonne	14,261	
9	6 March	Nolwenn Leroy	Bretonne	15,698	
10	13 March	Les Enfoirés	Dans l'œil des Enfoirés	135,159	
11	20 March	Les Enfoirés	Dans l'œil des Enfoirés	137,984	
12	27 March	Les Enfoirés	Dans l'œil des Enfoirés	54,952	
13	3 April	Johnny Hallyday	Jamais seul	99,089	
14	10 April	Johnny Hallyday	Jamais seul	22,593	
15	17 April	Colonel Reyel	Au Rapport	25,666	
16	24 April	Colonel Reyel	Au Rapport	17,475	
17	1 May	Les Prêtres	Gloria	29,466	
18	8 May	Les Prêtres	Gloria	25,050	
19	15 May	Les Prêtres	Gloria	16,996	
20	22 May	Les Prêtres	Gloria	21,195	
21	29 May	Lady Gaga	Born This Way	55,059	
22	5 June	Lady Gaga	Born This Way	18,687	
23	12 June	Adele	21	14,539	
24	19 June	Les Prêtres	Gloria	13,245	
25	26 June	The Black Eyed Peas	The Beginning	10,434	
26	3 July	Compilation	NRJ Summer Hits Only 2011	27,053	
27	10 July	Compilation	NRJ Summer Hits Only 2011	25,099	
28	17 July	Compilation	NRJ Summer Hits Only 2011	20,685	
29	24 July	Compilation	NRJ Summer Hits Only 2011	17,750	
30	31 July	Compilation	NRJ Summer Hits Only 2011	17,378	
31	7 August	Compilation	NRJ Extravadance 2011	26,678	
32	14 August	Compilation	NRJ Extravadance 2011	24,565	
33	21 August	Compilation	NRJ Extravadance 2011	14,525	
34	28 August	Adele	21	15,796	
35	4 September	David Guetta	Nothing but the Beat	53,693	
36	11 September	David Guetta	Nothing but the Beat	27,177	
37	18 September	David Guetta	Nothing but the Beat	18,188	
38	25 September	Adele	21	15,895	
39	2 October	Christophe Maé	On trace la route - Le live	24,808	
40	9 October	Adele	21	25,004	
41	16 October	Adele	21	24,523	
42	23 October	Adele	21	25,493	
43	30 October	Coldplay	Mylo Xyloto	56,820	
44	6 November	Adele	21	32,227	
45	13 November	Adele	21	32,066	
46	20 November	Adele	21	30,853	
47	27 November	Adele	21	35,539	
48	4 December	Adele	21	49,319	
49	11 December	Adele	21	61,189	
50	18 December	Adele	21	88,241	
51	25 December	Adele	21	129,523	
52	1 January	Compilation	NRJ Music Awards 2012	60,401	

== Top best-selling singles and albums in 2011 ==
This is the 20 best-selling of singles, and albums in 2011.

=== Singles ===
Pos.	Artist	Title	Pos.	Artist	Title
1	LMFAO featuring Lauren Bennett & GoonRock	"Party Rock Anthem"	11	Colonel Reyel	"Celui"
2	Adele	"Rolling in the Deep"	12	Magic System feat. Soprano	"Chérie Coco"
3	Israel Kamakawiwo'ole	"Over the Rainbow"	13	Rihanna feat. Calvin Harris	"We Found Love"
4	Adele	"Someone Like You"	14	Rihanna	"S&M"
5	The Black Eyed Peas	"Just Can't Get Enough"	15	Jessie J featuring B.o.B	"Price Tag"
6	Jennifer Lopez featuring Pitbull	"On the Floor"	16	Inna	"Sun Is Up"
7	Pitbull featuring Ne-Yo, Afrojack & Nayer	"Give Me Everything"	17	The Black Eyed Peas	"The Time (Dirty Bit)"
8	Mika	"Elle me dit"	18	Keen'V feat. SAP	"J'aimerais trop"
9	Rihanna	"Man Down"	19	The Black Eyed Peas	"Don't Stop the Party"
10	Snoop Dogg vs. David Guetta	"Sweat"	20	David Guetta featuring Rihanna	"Who's That Chick?"

== See also ==
- 2011 in music
- List of number-one singles in France
- List of artists who reached number one on the French Singles Chart
