= Tatararatatá =

2012 single

Single by Gabriela Moraes
- Released: 2012
- Songwriter(s): Cásio Sampaio

Gabriela Moraes singles chronology
"/"	"Tatararatatá"

Music video
- "Tatararatatá" on YouTube

"Pedida Perfeita"

Single by Maykow & Mandioca
- Released: January 2013
- Songwriter(s): Cásio Sampaio

Maykow & Mandioca singles chronology
"/"	"Pedida Perfeita"

Music video
- "Pedida Parfeita" on YouTube

"Tatararatatá" is a Portuguese-language song written by Cásio Sampaio and released by Brazilian singer Gabriela Moraes.

== Maykow & Mandioca ==
The sertanajo duo Maykow & Mandioca made an adapted version with additional lyrics as "Pedida Perfeita" using the main refrain of "Tatararatatá"

== Flavel & Neto version ==
"Pedida Perfeita (Tararatata)"

Single by Flavel & Neto featuring Anna Torres

from the album So um tempo
- Released: 11 February 2013
- Length: 2:52
- Label: Jive - (Sony)
- Songwriter(s): Cásio Sampaio; Akad Daroul; MK Louis
- Producer(s): Teetoff; Akad Daroul

Flavel & Neto featuring Anna Torres singles chronology
"Eu quero tchu, eu quero tcha" (2012)	"Pedida Perfeita (Tararatata)" (2013)

Music video
- "Pedida Parfeita" on YouTube

The track was made popular in European night venues by Brazilian/Cape Verde duo Flavel & Neto who had already become popular with another cover of the Brazilian sertanjo song "Eu quero tchu, eu quero tcha". The duo released it as "Pedida Perfeita (Tararatata)" although the cover of the release used the spelling "Pedida Perfeita (Tattararatata)" instead.

The song became particularly popular in zumba fitness classes and aerobic dance routines. The single included two versions of the song, Portuguese language version and the French version (with mixed bilingual French/Portuguese lyrics), the latter becoming a big hit for them in France reaching number 18 in SNEP, the official French Singles Chart. It also appeared in the Ultratip (bubbling under) French Belgian Singles Chart reaching number 11.

The song was included in the debut album of Flavel & Neto. It has been subject to many remixes including a famous version featuring Big Ali.

Track list

1. "Pedida perfeita (Tararatata)" (French version) (2:52)
2. "Pedida perfeita (Tararatata)" (Portuguese version) (2:52)

=== Charts ===
Flavel & Neto version

Country/Chart (2013)	Peak position
Ultratip Belgian (Wallonia) Singles Chart	11
SNEP French Singles Chart	18
