= Bleu noir =

Studio album by Mylène Farmer
- Released: 6 December 2010
- Recorded: 2010
- Genres: Dance-pop; electropop; synth-pop; pop rock; dark wave
- Label: Universal Music France
- Producers: Mylène Farmer, Danny Griffiths, Darius Keeler, RedOne, Moby

Mylène Farmer chronology
Nᵒ5 on Tour (2009)	Bleu noir (2010)	2001.2011 (2011)

Singles from Bleu noir
- 1. "Oui mais... non" Released: 29 November 2010; 2. "Bleu noir" Released: 18 April 2011; 3. "Lonely Lisa" Released: 4 July 2011

Bleu noir is the eighth studio album by the French singer Mylène Farmer, released on 6 December 2010.

Bleu noir is Farmer's first album produced without her longtime collaborator Laurent Boutonnat. Instead, she collaborated with Moby (with whom she had previously recorded duets in 2006 and 2008), the British band Archive and producer-songwriter RedOne, known for his work on Lady Gaga's hits "Poker Face" and "Bad Romance". Farmer herself wrote all the lyrics, which, characteristically, abound with literary references, notably drawing from the works of Pierre Reverdy.

The album received generally positive reviews from critics, who noted the variety of sounds and the contributions from different collaborators. Some went on to praise its overall quality and Mylène's vocal performances.

The first single from the album, "Oui mais... non," composed by RedOne, was released on 11 October 2010.

To promote the album, Farmer's record label set up a temporary website, which was launched on 3 November 2010. The music video for "Leila" premiered on the website on 22 November 2010, although there were no plans to release the song as a proper single.

The album entered the French Digital Chart at number one, with over 9,100 downloads. The following week the album also entered the physical chart at number one, selling 139,176 units in the first week. Both of these figures were records in terms of sales at the time. Bleu noir is Farmer's first studio album since 1991's L'Autre to outperform its predecessor in terms of national sales. By the end of 2010, Bleu noir had sold a total of 328,783 copies (312,978 in physical format and 15,805 downloads).

On 22 January 2011, it was announced that the second single would be the title track, set for release the following month. However, the release of "Bleu noir" was postponed until April due to the production of remixes. The music video for "Bleu noir" premiered on the album's promotional website on 16 March 2011.

The third single, "Lonely Lisa", was released on 4 July 2011.

As for other songs on the album, "Diabolique mon ange" was released to French radio on 4 December 2013, to promote Farmer's sixth live album, Timeless 2013.

== Track listing ==
All lyrics are written by Mylène Farmer except where noted; all music is composed by Moby except where noted.

No.	Title	Lyrics	Music	Producer(s)	Length
1.	"Oui mais... non"		RedOne; Jimmy Joker	RedOne	4:19
2.	"Moi je veux..."			Moby	3:30
3.	"Bleu noir"			Moby	4:04
4.	"N'aie plus d'amertume"			Moby	4:15
5.	"Toi l'amour"			Moby	4:40
6.	"Lonely Lisa"		RedOne; Joker	RedOne	3:02
7.	"M'effondre"			Moby	3:33
8.	"Light Me Up"		Darius Keeler	Archive	5:02
9.	"Leila"		Keeler	Archive	3:51
10.	"Diabolique mon ange"		Keeler	Archive	5:00
11.	"Inseparables"	Moby		Moby	4:08
12.	"Inséparables" (French version)			Moby	3:14

== Charts ==
=== Weekly charts ===
Chart (2010–11)	Peak position
Belgian Albums (Ultratop Flanders)	72
Belgian Albums (Ultratop Wallonia)	1
French Albums (SNEP)	1
Mexican Albums (AMPROFON)	98
Russian Albums (M2)	3
Swiss Albums (Schweizer Hitparade)	7
Swiss Albums (Schweizer Hitparade Romandy)	1
Greek Albums (IFPI)	36

=== Year-end charts ===
Chart (2010)	Position
Belgian Albums (Ultratop Wallonia)	39
French Albums (SNEP)	9
Chart (2011)	Position
Belgian Albums (Ultratop Wallonia)	9
French Albums (SNEP)	38

== Certifications and sales ==
Region	Certification	Certified units/sales
Belgium (BRMA)	Platinum	30,000^{*}
France (SNEP)	Diamond	410,000
Russia (NFPF)	Platinum	10,000^{*}
Switzerland (IFPI Switzerland)	Gold	10,000^{^}
Summaries
Worldwide	—	600,000
^{*} Sales figures based on certification alone.^{^} Shipments figures based on certification alone.

== Release history ==
Date	Label	Country	Format	Catalog
29 November 2010	Universal Music France	France	Digital	—
6 December 2010	Universal Music France	France	CD – Collector "Wooden School Writing Case"	2755537
6 December 2010	Universal Music France	France	LP	2755536
6 December 2010	Universal Music France	France	CD – Crystal Jewel box	2755534
6 December 2010	Universal Music France	France	CD – Digisleeve	2755535
7 December 2010	Polydor	Canada	Digital	—
15 February 2011	Universal Music México	México	CD – Digisleeve	2755535

== See also ==
- List of number-one singles of 2010 (France)
