= Au rapport =

Studio album by Colonel Reyel
- Released: 11 April 2011
- Recorded: 2010–2011
- Genre: Dancehall; R&B

Singles from Au rapport
- 1. "Celui..." Released: 2011; 2. "Toutes les nuits" Released: 2011; 3. "Aurélie" Released: 2011; 4. "Ma star" Released: 2011; 5. ""Dis-moi oui" feat Krys" Released: 2011

Au rapport is the debut album by French singer Colonel Reyel released on 11 April 2011.

== Singles ==
A number of songs have become singles from the album, starting with "Celui..." that topped the French Singles Chart followed by "Toutes les nuits" that also topped the French charts. The follow-up "Aurélie" about an adolescent single mother that created big controversy in the media despite being playing heavily in radios and appearances on television. The media blasted him for defending anti-abortion movements being decidedly against abortion, after an anti-abortion and anti-contraception movement used the song in its promotions. But Colonel Reyel defended his song against accusations explaining its context. The single made it to #6 in the French charts. The fourth single from the album was "Ma star" and cited notably singers Rihanna, Beyoncé, Shakira and Materazzi. The single reached #37 in France. A fifth and final single "Dis-moi oui" featured Krys and made it to #18 in the French Single Chart.

== Track list ==
1. "Celui..." (3:22)
2. "Toutes les nuits" (3:25)
3. "Ma star" (3:18)
4. "Aurélie" (3:23)
5. "Comme les autres" (3:22)
6. "Mon rêve" (3:41)
7. "Besoin d'évasion" (3:25)
8. "Dis-moi oui" (4:01)
9. "Le hasard n'existe pas" (3:01)
10. "Le destin nous porte" (3:47)
11. "Vendredi ou la nuit sauvage" (3:56)
12. "Game Over" (4:00)

== Charts ==
The album reached the top of SNEP, the official French Albums Chart staying 48 weeks in the chart. The album also reached #2 in Belgium's Wallonia (French) Album Chart staying 41 weeks in that chart. It was certified platinum in France in 2012.

=== Weekly charts ===
Chart (2011)	Peak position
Belgian Albums (Ultratop Wallonia)	2
French Albums (SNEP)	1

=== Year-end charts ===
Chart (2011)	Position
Belgian Albums (Ultratop Wallonia)	27
French Albums (SNEP)	11
