= Du temps =

Single by Mylène Farmer

from the album 2001.2011
- Released: 7 November 2011
- Recorded: 2011
- Genre: Dance-pop, electropop, eurodance
- Length: 3:39
- Label: Polydor, Universal Music
- Songwriters: Lyrics: Mylène Farmer; Music: Laurent Boutonnat
- Producer: Laurent Boutonnat

Mylène Farmer singles chronology
"Lonely Lisa" (2011)	"Du temps" (2011)	"À l'ombre" (2012)

Music video
- "Du temps" on YouTube

"Du temps" is a 2011 dance-pop song by French singer Mylène Farmer. It was written by Farmer with music composed by Laurent Boutonnat. The song is the first single from her second best of 2001.2011 and was released first digitally on 7 November 2011. The song was generally well received by critics, but divided Farmer's fans.

== Background and release ==
The promotional art cover was shown on the Internet on 2 November, and a 30-second excerpt was available to listen on the digital platforms, including amazon.fr. On 6 November, the full song was available on the Charts in France site, but was removed after a request by Universal Music. The music video for the song was scheduled to be released in mid-November.

As written on the back of the cover, the painting on the front was made by Farmer.

== Music video ==
Directed by Laurent Boutonnat, the music video was broadcast on the Internet on 9 December 2011. On a black background and a wet floor, Farmer and six male dancers perform a choreography, these images alternating with unpublished images of backstage filmed by Farmer's companion, Benoît Di Sabatino, during her 2009 tour. Jonathan Hamard of Charts in France found that "the aesthetics of the video for the song "Du temps" is much closer to [Farmer's last singles] than to the darker atmosphere of "Ainsi soit je..." and "Regrets"". Farmer did not perform a choreographied dance in one of her music videos since "Je t'aime mélancolie" in 1991.

The music video generally received positive reviews from critics. To French magazine Têtu, it was "in its general aesthetics, much closer to the star's latest videos (...). In addition to the choreography, the clip of "Du temps" contains scenes of Mylène Farmer who appears natural, in her daily life. One way for the singer to lift the veil on (part of) her privacy and to twist the blow to critics who accuse her of being too remote". The choreography was described as "superb" by Musiqueradio.com, and "electro, modern and sexy" by Ninapeople.com. Journalist Benoît Cachin considered the video as "quite simple", but "interesting" since inclusion of images of intimate moments, "in which the star reveals herself a little, provide (finally?) a very human side to the whole."

== Critical reception ==
The song received mostly positive reviews, but also some strong criticism, and became immediately successful on the digital platforms of download. Suite101 site noted that "the song fully satisfy [Farmer's] fans and irritates the others", and that "in two days, it is in the top three sales on !Tunes". Cachin considered it a "likable" and "well done" song in which the singer seems to "send a message of hope to his lover", but the journalist added that the song does not surprise Farmer's fans.

Musiqueradio.com said "Du temps" "is rather like the productions of Farmer's latest album", describing it as "an effective dance-pop song" which resembles "Lonely Lisa", and concludes that "the so special alchemy between the composer [Boutonnat] and Mylène Farmer still works perfectly". According to Charts in France site, the song is "electro"-oriented and "more in the continuity of the album Point de suture (2008) than that of the album Bleu noir, more stripped down and highlighting the artist's voice. There are similar arrangements as in "Dégénération," "Réveiller le monde" and "Sextonik"." Sylvain Zimmermann of Têtu stated "Du temps" is "a catchy electro pop song, with a typically farmerian chorus" and "a mix between the flights of "Innamoramento" and a sound club which recalls "Dégénération" or "Sextonik". French newspaper France Soir presented the song as the successful successor of the efficiency "Oui... mais non" and "Lonely Lisa", adding that the song "marks with promise the come back of the duet [Farmer-Boutonnat]". Later, summarizing the reviews left on the Internet, the newspaper concluded that the song "divides the singer's fans", some of them being "disappointed", but noted that in all cases, "the song deserves to create a buzz".

Much more critical, Gilles Médioni said on the blog of L'Express that the song has "botched lyrics" and is "really bad", adding that in terms of both music and lyrics, "it's nothing".

In January 2012, "Du temps" was elected the number one gay hit of the 2011 year, with 39% of votes, in a poll led by French magazine Têtu on its website.

== Live performances ==
Farmer performed the song at the 2012 NRJ Music Awards, broadcast on TF1 on 29 January 2012, and was awarded a Diamond Award.

== Chart performance ==
"Du temps" entered the French Singles Chart at number eight on the chart edition of 13 November 2011, which was the highest debut then, with 6,089 downloads. The following week, it was only number 78, making the biggest drop of all time on the chart, before falling off the top 100. However, it re-entered the chart on 10 December, and climbed up to number 80. After fluctuating up and down for some weeks, it made a huge jump from number 75 to number 4 on 23 January 2012, when the physical formats were released, selling 6,601 units. In the early beginning, the radio airplay of "Du temps" was very confident, but after some weeks, it was finally picked up by the radio stations and peaked at number 38 on the French airplay chart. It was also popular on NRJ in France, one of the country's biggest radio stations, where it was listed several times as one of the 20 most played songs of the moment.

In Switzerland, the single started at a peak of number 73. In Belgium (Wallonia), it entered the Ultratop 50 at number nine, on the chart edition of 19 November 2011 and then fell off the chart. After more than two months, "Du temps" re-entered the chart, when the physical formats were released, at number 32. It moved four places to 28 the next week before dropping again. However, it made much more impact in clubs and discothèques, peaking at number 12 on the Wallonian Dance Chart on the chart edition of 4 February 2012. On the radio airplay chart, the song had a similar trajectory as in France. On the chart edition of 25 February 2012, it entered the Ultratop 30 airplay chart, making a big jump from number 42 to 22, nearly four months after the single's release. It has since reached a peak of number 17.

== Formats and track listings ==
The formats and track listings of single releases of "Du temps":

- Digital download

No.	Title	Length
1.	"Du temps" (single version)	3:39
2.	"Du temps" (Tomer G reloaded club mix)	6:34
3.	"Du temps" (Mico C club remix)	5:14
4.	"Du temps" (Mico C radio edit)	3:36
5.	"Du temps" (instrumental)	3:35

- CD single – Promo

No.	Title	Length
1.	"Du temps" (single version)	3:39

- CD maxi – Promo

No.	Title	Length
1.	"Du temps" (Mico C club remix)	5:14
2.	"Du temps" (Tomer G reloaded club mix)	6:34
3.	"Du temps" (Mico C radio edit)	3:36
4.	"Du temps" (Tomer G reloaded radio edit)	3.37
5.	"Du temps" (version single)	3:38

- CD maxi

No.	Title	Length
1.	"Du temps" (version single)	3:38
2.	"Du temps" (Tomer G reloaded club mix)	6:34
3.	"Du temps" (Mico C club remix)	5:14
4.	"Du temps" (Mico C radio edit)	3:36
5.	"Du temps" (instrumental version)	3:35

- 12" maxi

No.	Title	Length
1.	"Du temps" (Tomer G reloaded club mix)	6:32
2.	"Du temps" (Mico C club remix)	5:12
3.	"Du temps" (single version)	3:40

== Credits and personnel ==
These are the credits and the personnel as they appear on the back of the single:

- Mylène Farmer – lyrics
- Laurent Boutonnat – music
- Requiem Publishing – editions
- Nathalie Delépine – photograph
- Mylène Farmer – drawing on sticker
- Henry Neu – design
- Made in the E.U.

== Charts ==
=== Peak positions ===
Chart (2011/12)	Peak position
Belgian (Wallonia) Airplay Chart	17
Belgian (Wallonia) Singles Chart	9
Belgian (Wallonia) Dance Chart	12
French Airplay Chart	38
French SNEP Singles Chart	4
Swiss Singles Chart	73

=== Year-end charts ===
Chart (2012)	Position
French Singles Chart	155

== Release history ==
Region	Date	Format
Belgium, France, Switzerland	7 November 2011	Digital download (single)
Belgium, France, Switzerland	16 January 2012	CD maxi, 12" maxi, digital download (remixes)
