= Logobi GT =

French musical group of logobi music

Logobi GT (La GT)
- Born: France
- Genres: Logobi
- Instrument: Dance
- Years active: 2010 – present
- Label: Five Music
- Members: Sisi-K; Cézar; Lassio Gabana; Norton; Sylja; Jordane
- Past members: Jojo; Lyas

Logobi GT later just La GT is a popular Logobi musical act in France, and one of the pioneers in making this genre of music from Africa popular in continental Europe. The group is signed to Five Music label and features Sisi-K on vocals with 4 dancers all originating from Africa and the Caribbean.

== Members ==
Logobi GT comes mainly from the Boullereaux, suburb of Champigny-sur-Marne and is composed of:

- Sisi-K - vocals - Central African Republic
- Cézar - dancer - Congo
- Lassio Gabana- dancer - Ivory Coast
- Norton - dancer - Congo
- Sylja - dancer - Guadeloupe
- Jordane - Terrasse - rhythm

Earlier members

- Jojo - dancer - Cape Verde
- Lyas - dancer - Cape Verde

== Discography ==
=== Albums ===
| Year | Album information | Chart FR | Notes |
|---|---|---|---|
| 2010 | La Puissance: Label: Five Music Records; Date of release: 14 November 2010 | 194 | Tracklist: 1. "Un bail ke yes!" (3:15); 2. "Elle danse sexy" (2:41); 3. "Le wazza" (3:18); 4. "Ke du flowz'r'" (3:14); 5. "La moundélé" (3:06); 6. "Lever, lever" (2:53); 7. "Viens dans nos soirées" (2:38); 8. "Gangsta" (3:02); 9. "Gâter le koin" (3:34); 10. "Affaire à suivre" (3:24); 11. "C ki pap" (megamix) (9:28); 12. "Elle danse sexy" (remix) (2:41) |

=== EPs ===
| Year | EP information | Chart FR | Notes |
|---|---|---|---|
| 2010 | La Danse du Flow: Label: Five Music Records; Date of release: 17 November 2014 | – | Tracklist: 1. "Sucré Salé" (Junior Caldera Remix 2014) (3:19); 2. "Marie Do" (Akad & Junior Caldera Radio Edit) (feat. Fally Ipupa) (3:28); 3. "Mais laisse tomber" (feat. Shakalewa) (3:23); 4. "Sucré Salé" (Junior Caldera Remix 2014) (Instrumental) (3:20); 5. "Marie Do" (Akad & Junior Caldera Radio Edit) (feat. Fally Ipupa) (instrumental) (3:30) |

=== Singles ===
| Year | Single | Chart | Album |
| Year | Single | FR | Album |
|---|---|---|---|
| 2010 | "Un bail ke yes!" (Sisi K feat. Logobi GT) | — | La Puissance |
| 2010 | "Elle danse sexy" (Sisi K & Logobi GT feat. BB Model) | 35 | La Puissance |
| 2011 | "Gâter le koin" (Sisi K feat. Logobi GT) | — | La Puissance |
| 2011 | "Sucré salé" (Logobi GT) | 80 | |
| 2012 | "Dis le moi " (Logobi GT feat. BB Model) | — | |
| 2012 | "Tout le monde crier" (Logobi GT) | — | |
| 2013 | "Si t'as le flow" (La GT) | — | |
| 2014 | "Marie Do" (Logobi GT feat. Fally Ipupa) | — | |
| 2016 | "Monte en l'air" (Logobi GT) | — | |

Featured in

| Year | Single | Chart | Album |
| Year | Single | FR | Album |
|---|---|---|---|
| 2012 | "La danse de la marelle" (Kid Toko feat. Logobi GT) | — | |
| 2017 | "Atchu tchutcha" (Flavel Romero feat. Logobi GT) | — | |
