= Lonely Lisa =

Single by Mylène Farmer

from the album Bleu Noir
- B-side: "Remix"
- Released: 4 July 2011
- Recorded: 2010
- Genre: Dance-pop, electropop, eurodance
- Length: 3:02
- Label: Polydor, Universal Music
- Songwriters: Lyrics: Mylène Farmer; Music: RedOne
- Producer: RedOne

Mylène Farmer singles chronology
"Bleu Noir" (2011)	"Lonely Lisa" (2011)	"Du temps" (2011)

"Lonely Lisa" is a 2010 song recorded by French singer-songwriter Mylène Farmer. It is the third single from her 2010 eighth album Bleu Noir and was released digitally on 16 May 2011, then it was released physically on 4 July. As "Oui mais... non", the lead single from the album, The lyrics were written by Farmer with the music composed by RedOne. The song title comes from a female character created by Farmer which was already used in her 2002 music video for "C'est une belle journée" and served as trademark for one of her commercial companies. Musically, the song has electro and dance sonorities. It was generally praised in the media and reached number-one on the French Singles Chart.

== Background and composition ==
Originally, the character of Lonely Lisa was a drawing created by Farmer. In 2002, it was used to illustrate the music video for "C'est une belle journée", then served as trademark registered by Farmer on 15 June 2007 to promote goods derivatived from her tale Lisa-Loup et le conteur. In 2008, Farmer started the website lonelylisa.com on which visitors can leave their artistic works — photographs, paintings, drawings... — inspired by the character of Lonely Lisa.

Unlike most of the tracks of the album Bleu Noir, "Lonely Lisa" is an electro-oriented song. Some lyrics seem to be inspired by Aristotle and Pierre Reverdy's Poèmes en prose.

== Release and remixes ==
In late April 2011, while the single "Bleu Noir" was just debuting on the chart, "Lonely Lisa" was officially announced as the next single from the album. A promotional CD was sent to radio stations on 2 May. The cover of the promotional single used a photograph by Hervé Lewis who had already produced the CD cover for "Oui mais... non", and shows Farmer displaying disheveled hair and dressed as a teenager. As noted by Jonathan Homard of Charts In France, the new version on the promotional CD was "embellished with new arrangements, particularly the bridge, enriching it with dance sounds to make more radio-playable than it already was". This version premiered on NRJ radio on 7 May, at 9.10 a.m. On 16 May, the album version was officially released digitally on the legal platforms of downloads, including iTunes, Virgin Megastores and Amazon. On 17 May, a promotional CD maxi was in turn sent to radio stations; it contained six new remixes, with a cover displaying an image of three dolls crying blood and having a large scar on the abdomen. However, a controversy occurred on the Internet, as some fans who owned the promotional formats did not allowed webmasters of fan sites to publish the images of the covers without paying. The next day, the list of remixers, which included Jérémy Hills, Mathieu Bouthier, Romain Curtis and Gilles Luka, Laurent Pepper, Greg B and Twill Yohanne, was published on Facebook. Universal Music also stated on its website that the song will be released on 4 July.

Twill, which produced three remixes with Yohanne Simon, explained that they were contacted by Universal Music a few weeks before the song release, asking them to create both club and radio remixes. He also explained that they had large freedom in the production and that Farmer was present at the recording. He added: "So we tried to conciliate the harmonic sound with the dancefloor one by highlighting the break and the voice of Mylène. To do this, we darkened the mood of the original piece, gave the maximum energy in the chorus and provided an original touch by making this break dubstep." The remixes were produced from the radio edit version.

Gilles Luka, who also participated in the remixes, explained in an interview that he and Romain Curtis were contacted in April 2011 to remix the song and that the production lasted a week. He added: "Our priority was to enhance Mylène's voice and to keep the lyrics in their entirety. We sought to harmonically respect the original melody while boosting the production. This is a remix that is more "radio" that truly "club"."

== Music video ==
A persistent rumour claimed that Benoit Di Sabatino, Farmer's companion, who previously directed "C'est une belle journée", "L'amour n'est rien..." and "Appelle mon numéro", produced the music video in May. Actually produced by Roy Raz and released by Universal Music on its website on 1 June, the video was shot in the desert, in Israel, near the Dead Sea, and the scenes in studio were filmed in Tel Aviv.

The video generally received positive critics. It was noted that it uses many recurring themes of the singer's universe and thus was the subject of several analyses. Jonathan Hamard of Charts in France said the video has "no scenario as that for "Libertine" or "California", but a neat aestheticism that deserves to be praised". According to the magazine Tele 7 Jours, David Lynch's 1984 film Dune is a potential source of inspiration of the video.

== Reception and chart performance ==
"Lonely Lisa" generally received positive reviews from media, and was particularly plebiscited by Farmer's fans, given the song was among "the most rhythmic and catchy hits by Mylène Farmer", according to Musique Radio website. For example, NRJ deemed it "a dynamic, rhythmic piece, with electro-sounding and simple but catchy chorus. A potentially future hit, as "Oui mais... non". France Soir qualified the song "wonderful" and a "very effective" "summer hit", while Gala said it "has a promising career in nightclubs". In contrast, Sylvain Siclier of Le Monde criticized the song, saying it "sounds mechanic and metallic". In August 2011, "Lonely Lisa" was elected the number one gay summer hit (out of 15 songs), with 38% of votes, in a poll led by French magazine Têtu on its website.

In France, the single debuted at number 41 on the chart edition of 25 June 2011, while being only available digitally, and dropped to number 97 the following week. Then, when the physical formats were marketed, the single climbed directly to number one, with 15,222 sales, becoming Farmer's twelfth number-one single in France. Then it dropped to number 17 and totaled 12 weeks on the chart. In Belgium (Wallonia), the single entered at a peak of number ten on 16 July 2011, dropped and remained for three weeks on the chart.

== Track listings ==
These are the formats and track listings of single releases of "Lonely Lisa":

- CD single

No.	Title	Length
1.	"Lonely Lisa" (single version)	3:05
2.	"Lonely Lisa" (Hurts remix)	3:15

- CD maxi 1 / 12" maxi 1

No.	Title	Length
1.	"Lonely Lisa" (single version)	3:03
2.	"Lonely Lisa" (Mathieu Bouthier & Muttonheads remix)	4:48
3.	"Lonely Lisa" (Lonely Jeremix)	5:06
4.	"Lonely Lisa" (Greg B extended remix)	5:31
5.	"Lonely Lisa" (Glam As You club mix)	8:31

- CD maxi 2

No.	Title	Length
1.	"Lonely Lisa" (single version)	3:03
2.	"Lonely Lisa" (Curtis & Luka extended mix)	5:18
3.	"Lonely Lisa" (Laurent Pepper remix extended)	5:38
4.	"Lonely Lisa" (Twill & Yohanne Simon remix)	6:29
5.	"Lonely Lisa" (instrumental version)	3:02

- 12" maxi 2

No.	Title	Length
1.	"Lonely Lisa" (single version)	3:02
2.	"Lonely Lisa" (Hurts remix)	3:15
3.	"Lonely Lisa" (Curtis & Luka extended mix)	5:18
4.	"Lonely Lisa" (Laurent Pepper remix extended)	5:38
5.	"Lonely Lisa" (Twill & Yohanne Simon remix)	6:28

- CD single - Promo

No.	Title	Length
1.	"Lonely Lisa"

- CD maxi - Promo 1

No.	Title	Length
1.	"Lonely Lisa" (Lonely Jerem radio remix)	2:48
2.	"Lonely Lisa" (Mathieu Bouthier & Muttonheads radio remix)	3:22
3.	"Lonely Lisa" (Curtis & Luka radio mix)	3:30
4.	"Lonely Lisa" (Laurent Pepper remix radio edit)	3:00
5.	"Lonely Lisa" (Twill & Yohanne Simon remix radio)	3:39
6.	"Lonely Lisa" (Greg B remix edit)	3:16

- CD maxi - Promo 2

No.	Title	Length
1.	"Lonely Lisa" (Mathieu Bouthier & Muttonheads remix)	4:48
2.	"Lonely Lisa" (Mathieu Bouthier & Muttonheads dub)	4:32
3.	"Lonely Lisa" (Lonely Jeremix)	5:04
4.	"Lonely Lisa" (Lonely Jerem dub mix)	5:04
5.	"Lonely Lisa" (Greg B extended remix)	5:30
6.	"Lonely Lisa" (single version)	3:02

- CD maxi - Promo 3

No.	Title	Length
1.	"Lonely Lisa" (Curtis & Luka extended mix)	5:18
2.	"Lonely Lisa" (Laurent Pepper remix extended)	5:38
3.	"Lonely Lisa" (Twill & Yohanne Simon remix)	6:28
4.	"Lonely Lisa" (Twill & Yohanne Simon dub remix)	6:28
5.	"Lonely Lisa" (single version)	3:02

- Digital download

All the versions available on the formats above

== Credits and personnel ==
These are the credits and the personnel as they appear on the back of the single:

- Mylène Farmer – lyrics
- RedOne – music
- Stuffed Monkey/RedOne – editions
- LLC admin by Sony ATV Songs LLC (BMI) – production
- Hervé Lewis - photograph on CD promo, recto of CDs maxi
- Nathalie Delépine - photograph on CD promo remixes, back of CDs maxi
- Henry Neu – design
- Made in the E.U.

== Charts ==
Weekly chart performance for "Lonely Lisa"
Chart (2011)	Peak position
Belgium (Ultratop 50 Wallonia)	10
Belgium (Ultratop Dance Wallonia)	15
CIS Airplay (TopHit)	92
France (SNEP)	1
Ukraine Airplay (TopHit)	89

== Release history ==
Region	Date	Format
Belgium, France	2 May 2011	Promo CD single
Belgium, France	16 May 2011	Digital download
Belgium, France	17 May 2011	Promo CD maxi
France	4 July 2011	CD single, CD maxi 1, CD maxi 2, 12" maxi 1, 12" maxi 2
Belgium	5 July 2011	CD single, CD maxi 1, CD maxi 2, 12" maxi 1, 12" maxi 2

== See also ==
- List of number-one hits of 2011 (France)
