= Moussier Tombola =

French comedian (born 1987

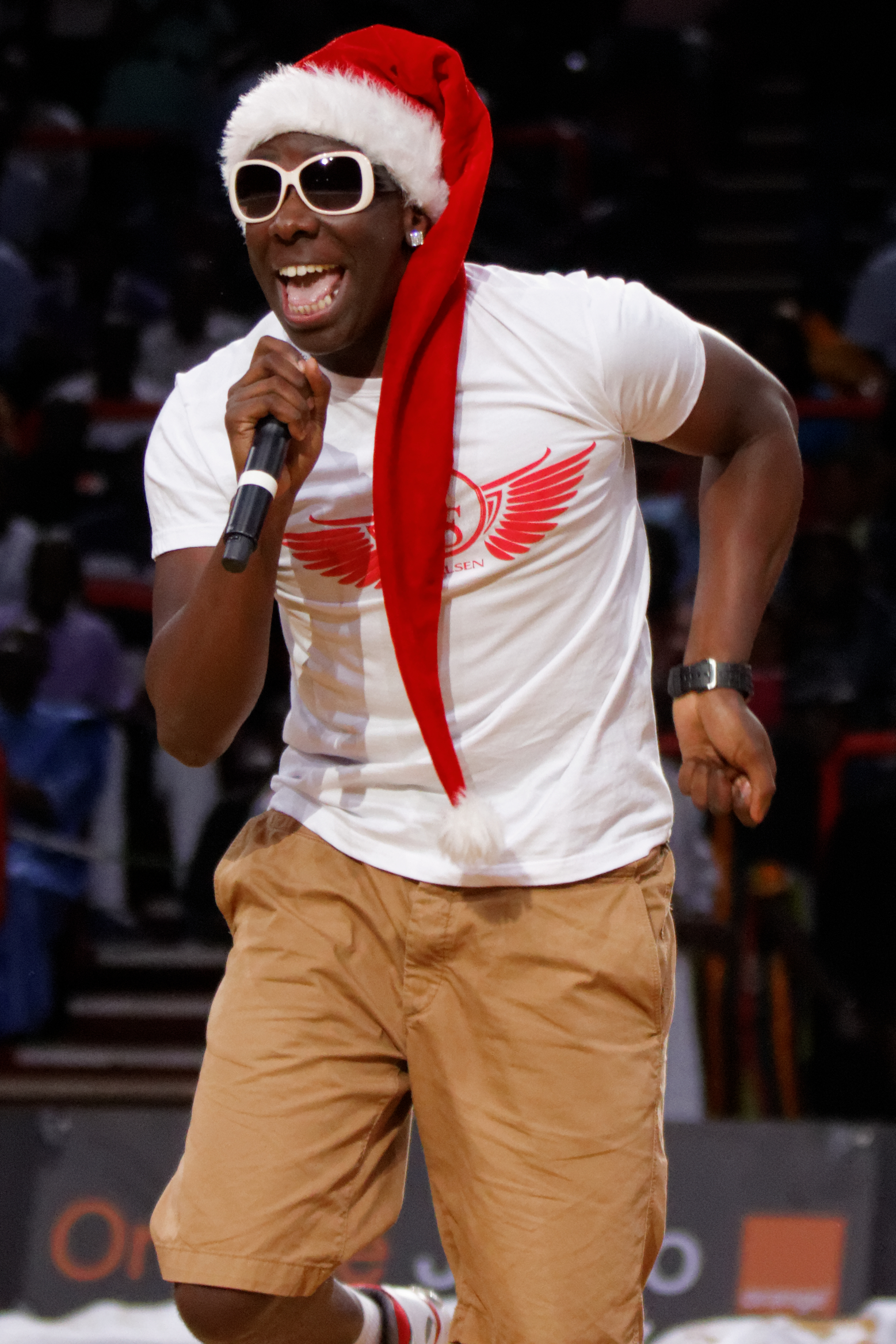
Moussier Tombola in 2013

Moussier Tombola (born 1987) is a French comedian, including stand-up comedy.

He named himself Moussier Tombola, exactly as his father would pronounce the word "Monsieur" (Mr. in French).

== Early life ==
He was born in Saint-Dié-des-Vosges on 21 February 1987, of Senegalese descent.

== Career ==
In 2011, Tombola released his debut single "Logobitombo (Corde à sauter)", reaching number five in the official French Singles Chart. The song is based on infectious dance moves that became a craze and went viral on YouTube, and eventually a big hit. "Logobitombo" is a created word combining the African music genre and dance Logobi, combined with Tombo (part of his name) – literally, Tombola-style Logobi music.

The music video, in cooperation with his friend Jessy Matador and directed by Hilton Aya, also refers to the success via YouTube.

== Discography ==
=== Album ===
Le Dernier De La Classe Classe

=== Singles ===
Year	Single	Charts		Certification	Album
Year	Single	BEL Wa	FR	Certification	Album
2011	"Logobitombo (Corde à sauter)"	3	5		Le Dernier De La Classe Classe
2012	"Pompelup"	–	82		Le Dernier De La Classe Classe
2012	"La Vie Est Un Combat"				
2014	"TOMBOLLYWOOD"				
2020	"Ambiance Bengance Tendance"				2024
