= Bleu Noir (song) =

2011 single by Mylène Farmer

Single by Mylène Farmer

from the album Bleu Noir
- B-side: "Remix"
- Released: 18 April 2011
- Recorded: 2010
- Genre: Pop rock, electronica
- Length: 4:04 (album version)
- Label: Polydor, Universal Music
- Songwriters: Lyrics: Mylène Farmer; Music: Moby
- Producer: Moby

Mylène Farmer singles chronology
"Oui mais... non" (2010)	"Bleu Noir" (2011)	"Lonely Lisa" (2011)

"Bleu noir" ("Blue Black") is a 2010 song by French pop musician Mylène Farmer. It is the second single to her eighth studio album Bleu Noir, released in December 2010. The song was written and produced by Moby with lyrics by Farmer, and the music video produced by French film director Olivier Dahan. It was released on 18 April 2011. In France, the song became Farmer's eleventh number-one hit on the singles chart, but quickly dropped.

== Background and release ==
"Bleu noir" is Farmer's second single produced and written by Moby, following their 2006 single "Slipping Away (Crier la vie)". On 23 January 2011, it was announced that "Bleu Noir" would be the second single of the album, and on 17 March, Universal Music announced on its website that the release was scheduled for 18 April. Remixed versions of the song named 'Jérémy Hills remix' and 'Glam as you radio mix' were respectively sent to the radios on 10 and 31 March. Formats, track listings and covers arts were officially revealed on 24 and 25 March.

Moby, the composer of the song, also released his own version of the track in May, with other lyrics and arrangements, called "The Day" and which was the official lead single of his then forthcoming album Destroyed.. This simultaneous release created a little controversy amongst fans of Farmer, as many of them criticized the fact that he gave the music to the songstress and then reappropriated it for his own album. In an interview published on 18 May 2011 in the Belgian newspaper Le Soir, Moby said he was very embarrassed and deemed the release of "The Day" as a single an "error", since Farmer was disappointed, thinking "it was her song".

Lyrically, the theme's song is a message of hope saying that love is stronger than death. The words 'blue black' in the title refers to the ink and expresses the idea that when a love story ends, writings are the only things to recalls it. According to the author Alice Novak, guitars used in the song are almost similar to the riffs on The Cure's songs.

== Music video ==
Directed by producer Olivier Dahan, the music video premiered on the temporary website for the album on 16 March 2011, then was fully broadcast on television two days later. It has no screenplay and is composed of an over four-minute long take without cuts. Regarded as rather "sober" and sometimes "simplistic", with a majority of black and white colors, the video depicts Farmer walking in a countryside, a forest and a snow-covered plains, and ends with a fireworks display. The video generally received positive reviews in the media. Têtu deemed Farmer as being "melancholic and moving" in the video. Several media, including Gala, Pure People and 20 Minutes considered that various elements of the video, such as the snow and the forest, are a tribute to Farmer's first music videos of her career, including "Tristana", "Regrets" and "Ainsi soit je...", and that it is "aesthetic". L'Express analyzed the symbolism of the colours used in the video.

== Critical reception ==
"Bleu Noir" received reviews from the album release. According to Gala, the song "will reconcile the fans of the first time and followers of British pop". Sylvain Siclier of Le Monde considered that, alongside "Toi l'amour", "Bleu Noir" is the most pop song of the album, with "light takeoffs, trippy atmosphere", is "close to the musical universal of the singer" and noted that her "voice is particularly present".

== Chart performance ==
The song entered the Walloon Ultratip Chart at number 35 and reached number one two weeks later. It started at number 16 on the Ultratop 50 chart on 30 April 2011, fell off for one week, then re-entered at number 21 the next week after being heavily played on radio, and totaled six weeks on the chart. In France, the single debuted at number one on the main singles chart which combines physical and digital sales on the chart edition of 24 April 2011, becoming Farmer's eleventh number-one single in France. In the first week, the single totaled 10,770 sales, including 9,743 units of the physical formats only, which was the highest weekly physical sales of 2011 for a number one in the country. The following week, the single performed which was then the biggest drop from number one, falling to number 36, with an 81% decline in sales from the previous week. It remained on the chart for six weeks. The music video reached number 21 on the TV airplay chart of 7 April 2011.

== Formats and track listings ==
These are the formats and track listings of single releases of "Bleu Noir":

- Digital download

No.	Title	Length
1.	"Bleu Noir" (single version)	4:04
2.	"Bleu Noir" (instrumental)	4:05
3.	"Bleu Noir" (Glam as you radio mix by Guéna LG)	4:05
4.	"Bleu Noir" (Jeremy Hills remix)	3:22
5.	"Bleu Noir" (Glam as you club mix by Guéna LG)	7:41
6.	"Bleu Noir" (Jeremy Hills extended remix)	4:36
7.	"Bleu Noir" (Jeremy Hills dub remix)	4:35

- CD single

No.	Title	Length
1.	"Bleu Noir"	4:04
2.	"Bleu Noir" (Instrumental)	4:06

- CD maxi

No.	Title	Length
1.	"Bleu Noir"	4:04
2.	"Bleu Noir" (Glam As You radio mix)	4:05
3.	"Bleu Noir" (Jeremy Hills remix)	3:23
4.	"Bleu Noir" (Glam As You club mix)	7:41
5.	"Bleu Noir" (Jeremy Hills extended remix)	4:36
6.	"Bleu Noir" (Jeremy Hills dub remix)	4:36

- 12" maxi

No.	Title	Length
1.	"Bleu Noir" (Glam As You club mix)	7:41
2.	"Bleu Noir" (Jeremy Hills extended remix)	4:36
3.	"Bleu Noir" (single version)	4:04

- CD single – Promo

No.	Title	Length
1.	"Bleu noir"	4:04

- CD single 1 – Promo remix

No.	Title	Length
1.	"Bleu Noir" (Jeremy Hills remix)	3:23

- CD single 2 – Promo remix

No.	Title	Length
1.	"Bleu noir" (Glam As You radio mix)	4:05

== Credits and personnel ==
These are the credits and the personnel as they appear on the back of the single:

- Mylène Farmer – lyrics
- Moby – music
- Stuffed Monkey / Little Idiot Music – editions
- Polydor / Universal Music France – recording company
- Made in the E.U.

== Charts ==
Weekly chart performance for "Bleu Noir"
Chart (2011)	Peak position
Belgium (Airplay Chart Wallonia)	12
Belgium (Ultratop 50 Wallonia)	16
France (SNEP)	1

== Release history ==
Region	Date	Format
Belgium, France, Switzerland	28 January 2011	Promo CD single
Belgium, France, Switzerland	20 March 2011	Promo CD remixes 1
Belgium, France, Switzerland	31 March 2011	Promo CD remixes 2
Belgium, France, Switzerland	18 April 2011	Digital download, CD single, CD maxi, 12" maxi

== See also ==
- List of number-one hits of 2011 (France)
- List of artists who reached number one on the French Singles Chart
