= Logobitombo (Corde à sauter) =

Single by Moussier Tombola
- Released: 2011
- Recorded: 2011
- Genre: Dance; Novelty song

Music video
- ""Logobitombo (Corde à sauter)"" on YouTube

"Logobitombo (Corde à sauter)" is the 2011 novelty song and debut single of the Senegalese-French comedian Moussier Tombola. He released it in 2011 reaching #5 in the official French Singles Chart. It also reached on Belgium's Wallonia Singles Chart.

Title "Logobitombo" comes from a created word combining the African music genre and dance Logobi on the style of which the music is composed, combined with Tombo (part of the artist's name), making "Logobitombo" literally Tombola-style Logobi music. The song is based on infectious dance moves that became a craze and went viral on YouTube, and eventually became a big hit. The music video directed by Hilton Aya features Moussier Tombola teaching various groups of ordinary people the dance moves. The video also in cooperation with Tombola's friend Congolese-French Jessy Matador who refers to Tombola tongue-in-cheek about the success via YouTube.

Moussier Tombola also released an instructional video how to dance the Logobitombo.

The song contains simple dance-moves each named often as someone from pop-culture including Batman, Spider-Man, Iron Man, Superman and Antoine Griezmann.

== Charts ==
Chart (2011)	Peak position
France - (SNEP)	5
Belgium - Ultratop 40 Wallonia Charts	3
