= Oui mais... non =

Single by Mylène Farmer

from the album Bleu Noir
- B-side: "Remix"
- Released: 11 October 2010
- Recorded: 2010
- Genre: Dance-pop, electropop, europop
- Length: 4:19 (radio edit)
- Label: Polydor, Universal Music
- Songwriters: Mylène Farmer (lyrics); RedOne (music)
- Producer: RedOne

Mylène Farmer singles chronology
"Paradis inanimé (live)" (2010)	"Oui mais... non" (2010)	"Bleu Noir" (2011)

"Oui mais... non" (English: "Yes But... No") is a 2010 song by French pop musician Mylène Farmer. It is the leading single to her eighth studio album Bleu Noir, released in December 2010. The single was released to radio stations on 29 September, then available for pre-order on 11 October in the digital music market, and on 29 November in CD single. The lyrics were written by Farmer and the music composed by RedOne. Unlike all of her previous tracks, Laurent Boutonnat was not involved in the song's production or composition.

== History ==
On 28 September 2010, NRJ issued a press release announcing that "Oui mais... non" would be aired the next day on the radio, at 7.30 a.m. It also revealed the name of the composer and producer and said that this single would be the first single of Farmer's new album. Immediately, many newspapers, including Le Parisien, Ouest France and Gala, published the information, and many Internet sites did it also. The next day, the recording company Universal Music said the single would be released first digitally on 11 October. On 22 October, physical formats with remixes by Tomer G, Klaas and Chew Fu were scheduled to be released on 29 November.

In an interview, RedOne explained why he had decided to compose for Farmer, stating: "I've always been a fan of Mylène Farmer. It's like a legend to me. And when Pascal Nègre called me if I wanted to work with her, I said: "Absolutely! I am a big fan!""

== Music video ==
According to Pascal Nègre, the music video will be available in early November. The music video premiered on the temporary website for the album on 16 November 2010. The video is directed by Chris Sweeney. In it, the singer appeared dressed in shiny black leather with a crucifix around her neck, and is surrounded by dancers performing a choreographed dance. Many critics consider that this video is inspired by the music videos for "Bad Romance" and "Alejandro" by Lady Gaga.

== Critical reception ==
Ozap stated that "those who accused the singer to not renew herself may be satisfied" and qualified the song as "a dance track, far from the melodies to which the singer has accustomed us", but added that "the production is, unsurprisingly, focused on very 1990s synths". According to RTL, the song "will make dance the dancefloors". By contrast, Voici refused to give its review, saying that it would be negative. Jon O'Brien from AllMusic slammed the song for the "irritating Scooter-esque high-pitched synths". Kylie Minogue and Lady Gaga publicly stated they liked the song.

On 11 October, Universal Music announced on its website that the song rocked atop of the digital chart after just a few hours. It entered at number one with about 9,200 downloads, which was considered as disappointing, then directly dropped to number 17, which is the biggest drop for a number-one on this chart. However, after dropping to number 28, it regained some positions every week until reaching number 13 at the end of November and number 6 in mid-December, thus having a much better chart performance than "Dégénération", the first single from her previous album.

On the physical chart, the single debuted at number one on 3 December 2010, selling about 9,700 units, dislodging René la Taupe's hit "Mignon "Mignon". The single remained atop the following week with 14,961 units. It remained in the top position of the chart for another one week. To date, it has sold about 50,000 CDs and was downloaded legally more than 80,000 times, overall selling about 130,000 copies, thus being even more successful than Farmer's 2005 single "Fuck Them All" (which was released when the music market was in a better shape), and her biggest hit since "C'est une belle journée" (2002). It is also the forty-third commercially most successful single in France in 2010 (sales and downloads), although released in October.

In Belgium (Wallonia), the single debuted at number three on the chart edition of 23 October 2010. It then dropped the next few weeks to number 19, then climbed to a peak of number two on 11 December 2010. In Switzerland, the single peaked at number 52 in the second week, on 31 October 2010.

== Formats and track listings ==
These are the formats and track listings of single releases of "Oui mais... non":

- CD single

No.	Title	Length
1.	"Oui mais... non" (single version)	4:19
2.	"Oui mais... non" (chorus version)	4:19

- CD maxi

No.	Title	Length
1.	"Oui mais... non" (single version)	4:19
2.	"Oui mais... non" (Tomer G club remix)	6:16
3.	"Oui mais... non" (Jeremy Hills club remix)	5:57
4.	"Oui mais... non" (Chew Fu refix)	6:22
5.	"Oui mais... non" (Klaas mix club edit)	5:49

- Digital download

No.	Title	Length
1.	"Oui mais... non" (radio edit)	4:19

- CD single - Promo

No.	Title	Length
1.	"Oui mais... non" (radio edit)	4:19

- CD single - Promo club remix

No.	Title	Length
1.	"Oui mais... non" (Jeremy Hills club remix)	5:58
2.	"Oui mais... non" (Jeremy Hills dub remix)	5:54

- CD single - Promo remixes

No.	Title	Length
1.	"Oui mais... non" (Tomer G club remix)	6:16
2.	"Oui mais... non" (Jeremy Hills dub remix)	5:55
3.	"Oui mais... non" (Jeremy Hills club remix)	5:57
4.	"Oui mais... non" (Klaas extended dub mix)	5:40
5.	"Oui mais... non" (Chew Fu refix)	6:21
6.	"Oui mais... non" (single version)	4:19

- CD single - Promo remix

No.	Title	Length
1.	"Oui mais... non" (Glam as You radio mix)	3:50

- CD single - Promo club mix

No.	Title	Length
1.	"Oui mais... non" (Glam as You club mix)	7:59

== Credits and personnel ==
These are the credits and the personnel as they appear on the back of the single:

- Mylène Farmer – lyrics
- RedOne – music
- Hervé Lewis - photos
- Henry Neu – design
- RedOne Productions LLC / Stuffed Monkey – editions
- Made in the E.U.

== Charts and sales ==
=== Weekly charts ===
Weekly chart performance for "Oui mais... non"
Chart (2010)	Peak position
Belgium (Ultratop 50 Wallonia)	2
Belgian (Wallonia) Airplay Chart	18
Belgian Dance Chart	16
CIS Airplay (TopHit)	71
France Airplay Chart	34
France Club Chart	49
France Digital Chart	1
France Physical Singles Chart	1
France TV Airplay Chart	1
Quebec (ADISQ)	43
Russia Airplay (TopHit)	97
Switzerland (Schweizer Hitparade)	52

=== Year-end charts ===
Year-end chart performance for "Oui mais... non"
Chart (2010)	Position
French SNEP Singles Chart	6

=== Sales ===
Country	Certification	Physical sales	Digital downloads
France	—	43,000	130,000

== See also ==
- List of number-one hits of 2010 (France)
