= Eu Quero Tchu, Eu Quero Tcha =

2012 single by João Lucas & Marcelo

Single by João Lucas & Marcelo
- Released: 2011
- Genre: Sertanejo, pop, funknejo
- Length: 2:56
- Label: Som Livre
- Songwriter: Shylton Fernandes

João Lucas & Marcelo singles chronology
"Eu Quero Tchu, Eu Quero Tcha" (2011)	"Louca Louquinha" (2012)

Music video
- "Eu Quero Tchu, Eu Quero Tcha" on YouTube

"Eu Quero Tchu, Eu Quero Tcha" (I Want Tchu, I Want Tcha), full title "Eu Quero Tchu Eu Quero Tcha (Tchu Tcha Tcha)" is a single by Brazilian Sertanejo universitário duo João Lucas & Marcelo, released in 2012, and written by Shylton Fernandes. The song was a hit in Brazil, following the success of similar songs such as Michel Teló's "Ai Se Eu Te Pego" and Gusttavo Lima's "Balada", though not as successful in Europe as them. These are the songs known as "The Neymar songs" together with the other popular song Parado no bailão

== Track list ==
EP

1. "Eu Quero Tchu, Eu Quero Tcha (Tchu Tcha Tcha)"
2. "Eu Quero Tchu, Eu Quero Tcha (Tchu Tcha Tcha)" (Rico Bernasconi remix)
3. "Eu Quero Tchu, Eu Quero Tcha (Tchu Tcha Tcha)" (Rico Bernasconi radio mix)

== Music video ==
The soccer-themed official video of the song was filmed by Benza Deus Filmes and was directed by Cassius Cordero. It features a cameo appearance of Brazilian footballer Neymar. Neymar wearing the Brazilian national colours scores a penalty goal as the fans get crazy. He heads towards them and starts dancing (doing the Tchu Tcha Tcha). Everybody is jubilant and starts dancing as well as João Lucas & Marcelo start singing. In a later frame, the Brazilian players are celebrating and João Lucas & Marcelo appear also in similar soccer jerseys and flank Neymar Jr. Neymar is wearing the jersey #11 whereas João Lucas & Marcelo are wearing the jerseys 9 and 10 respectively.

Personnel

- Director – Cassius Cordero
- Production director – Gustavo Cabral
- Executive producer – Rafael Ronconi
- Director of photography – Carlos Firminio
- Produced by Benza Deus Filmes

== In popular culture ==
The song was featured on Rede Globo's telenovela Avenida Brasil's soundtrack.

In the Brazilian version of The Simpsons' episode "The Spy Who Learned Me", protagonist Homer Simpson sang the chorus of the song when arriving home.

Politician José Serra, who ran for mayor of São Paulo in the 2012 Brazilian municipal elections, used an alternate version of the song during his campaign.

== Cover versions and samplings ==
The song was sampled in the single "Tchu Tchu Tcha", by rapper Pitbull featuring Spanish singer Enrique Iglesias. The track is part of the Global Warming track listing.

The Colombian reggaeton duo Jay & El Punto sampled it in their song "El Baile del Tchu Tcha Tcha" influenced with champeta and soca.

The Canadian Cesar Rezer made a multilingual adaptation in English, French, Arabic and Portuguese titled "Je veux le Tchu, Tcha, Tcha" featuring Canadian DJ and vocalist David Obegi.

=== Flavel & Neto version ===
"Eu Quero Tchu, Eu Quero Tcha"

Single by Flavel & Neto

from the album So um tempo
- Released: Jul 23, 2012
- Genre: Sertanejo, pop
- Length: 3:06
- Label: Jive Music / SME France
- Songwriters: Shylton Fernandes; Sousa Aquinho
- Producers: Teetoff; Akad Daroul

Flavel & Neto singles chronology
"Eu Quero Tchu, Eu Quero Tcha" (2012)	"Pedida perfeita (Tararatata)" (2013)

Music video
- "Eu Quero Tchu, Eu Quero Tcha" (Portuguese version) on YouTube

Music video
- "Eu Quero Tchu, Eu Quero Tcha" (French version) on YouTube

It was popularized in France and various European dance venues through a Brazilian/Cape Verdean French duo Flavel & Neto through a release on July 23, 2012 on Jive Music French record label. Although keeping the title as "Eu Quero Tchu, Eu Quero Tcha", it was marketed on the single cover artwork as "Tchu Tcha Tcha - o Neymar dançado".

The song also appeared as track #1 on Flavel & Neto album Su um tempo released on SME France.

==== Track list ====
1. "Eu quero tchu, Eu quero tcha" (3:06)

== Charts ==
=== Weekly charts ===
==== João Lucas & Marcelo version ====
Country/Chart (2012)	Peak position
Billboard Brasil Hot 100	1
Hot Popular Songs	1

==== Flavel & Neto version ====
Country/Chart (2013)	Peak position
SNEP French Singles Chart	55
