= João Lucas & Marcelo =

Brazilian singing duo

- Origin: Brazil
- Genres: Sertanejo
- Occupation: Singers
- Members: João Lucas; Marcelo
- Website: www.joaolucasemarcelo.com.br

João Lucas & Marcelo (also is João Lucas e Marcelo) is a sertanejo style Brazilian singing duo formed in 2010. João Lucas (born in 1980 in Miranorte, Tocantins) is a vocalist and multi-instrumentalist. Marcelo (born 1986 in Cáceres, Mato Grosso) is main vocalist, and a songwriter who has written songs for Vitor e Léo, Luan Santana, Fernando e Sorocaba and others. They are most famous for their hit "Eu Quero Tchu, Eu Quero Tcha". The song's choreography was re-enacted by Brazilian football (soccer) player Neymar celebrating his hundredth career goal. The song reached Top 10 of Brasil Hot 100 Airplay. The song has become famous again through edits of the Spanish footballer Lamine Yamal on TikTok.

== Discography ==
=== Albums ===
Year	Album details
2012	João Lucas & Marcelo: Release date: 2012; Label: Som Livre

=== EPs ===
- 2012: Eu Quero Tchu, Eu Quero Tcha (Letra e música para ouvir)
- 2012: Louca Louquinha (EP)

=== Singles ===
- 2012: "Eu Quero Tchu, Eu Quero Tcha"
