= Wet (Snoop Dogg song) =

2010 single by Snoop Dogg

Single by Snoop Dogg

from the album Doggumentary
- Released: December 17, 2010
- Recorded: 2010
- Studio: Conway Recording Studios, Hollywood, California
- Genre: Hip hop
- Length: 3:47
- Label: Doggystyle; Priority
- Songwriters: Calvin Broadus; David Singer-Vine; Niles Hollowell-Dhar
- Producer: The Cataracs

Snoop Dogg singles chronology
"Kush" (2010)	"Wet" (2010)	"Boyfriend" (2011)

"Wet" is the official lead single from hip-hop artist Snoop Dogg's eleventh studio album Doggumentary. The original version was produced by the Cataracs. "Wet" reached number 40 on the Hot R&B/Hip-Hop Songs, number 18 on the Hot Rap Songs and number 13 on the Bubbling Under Hot 100 Singles. A remix of the song entitled "Sweat" was released by French DJ David Guetta on March 4, 2011.

== Background ==
"Wet" was written by Snoop Dogg along with the Cataracs, who produced the song. Snoop Dogg specifically recorded the song for William, Prince of Wales's (then Prince William of Wales) bachelor party. Titled "Wet", Snoop spokespeople bill the song as a sequel to 2008's "Sexual Eruption". Produced by the Cataracs, producers of the number-one single "Like a G6", Snoop spoke of the gift: "When I heard the [British] royal family wanted to have me perform in celebration of Prince William's marriage, I knew I had to give them a little something. 'Wet' is the perfect anthem for Prince William or any playa to get the club smokin'." The song was premiered on Snoop's SnoopDogg.com website at precisely 4:20 pm PST, November 30. The official remix, featuring Jim Jones and Shawty Lo, was released on February 8, 2011, as a part of Snoop Dogg's Puff Puff Pass Tuesdays giveaway.

== David Guetta remix ==
"Sweat"

Single by Snoop Dogg vs. David Guetta

from the album Nothing but the Beat
- Released: March 4, 2011
- Recorded: 2011
- Genre: Hip house; dance-pop; electro house
- Length: 3:16
- Label: Priority; Doggystyle; Capitol; EMI
- Songwriters: Calvin Broadus; Cheri Williams; Derek Jenkins; Dwayne Richardson; Cassio Ware; David Singer-Vine; Niles Hollowell-Dhar; Guetta; Tuinfort; Riesterer
- Producers: David Guetta; Giorgio Tuinfort; Frederic Riesterer

David Guetta singles chronology
"Who's That Chick?" (2010)	"Sweat" (2011)	"Where Them Girls At" (2011)

The second official remix features production by French DJ David Guetta. This version is entitled "Sweat", and was released on March 4, 2011. A dub remix, which features production by both Guetta and Afrojack, was released on May 13, 2011.

== Chart performance ==
In the United Kingdom, "Sweat" debuted at number 16 on the UK Singles Chart before moving into the top ten of the chart two weeks later, and eventually peaking at number four. The song also hit number one in Belgium for three non-consecutive weeks, as well as in France, topping the charts during two weeks and stayed 32 weeks overall. Elsewhere, "Wet" also peaked within the top ten of the charts in Finland, Germany and Ireland. On March 14, 2011, "Sweat" debuted on the ARIA Singles Chart at number 60, and the following week it climbed 51 places to number nine. Three weeks later it reached number one for a week, becoming Snoop's third number one single in Australia. It has since been certified 4× platinum with sales exceeding 280,000.

== Music video ==
The video for "Wet" was shot at the Palms Casino in Las Vegas. The video shows scenes including Snoop laying next to several women and walking through a hallway with more women dancing around him. The music video for the song premiered on Snoop Dogg's Vevo account on January 5, 2011. Two edited versions of the video have been released for "Sweat", one of them containing extra scenes featuring Guetta himself. The music video gained controversy in France, whom the broadcasting would be ban by French Superior Audiovisual Council before 10 p.m with a warning Not advised to kids under 10 years old (in French : déconseillé aux moins de 10 ans). The original music video, "Wet", without David Guetta's feature, was broadcast after 11 p.m with a warning Not advised to kids under 16 years old (in French : déconseillé aux moins de 16 ans) on some channels before the ban of the former due to the explicit sexual content in both of the videos and erotic images as well as the vulgarity and an degrading image of the women on it.

== Track listing ==
- "Wet" digital download
1. "Wet" – 3:47
- "Sweat" digital download
1. "Sweat" (David Guetta Remix) – 3:15
- Digital download E.P.
1. "Sweat" (David Guetta Remix) – 3:15
2. "Sweat" (David Guetta Extended Remix) – 5:43
3. "Sweat" (David Guetta & Afrojack Dub Remix) - 7:30
4. "Wet" (David Guetta Extended Remix) – 5:42
- German CD single
1. "Sweat" (David Guetta Remix) – 3:15
2. "Wet" (David Guetta Remix) – 3:16

== Credits and personnel ==
=== "Sweat" ===
- Songwriting – Calvin Broadus, David Singer-Vine, Niles Hollowell-Dhar, David Guetta, Giorgio Tuinfort, Frédéric Riesterer, Derek Jenkins, Cheri Williams, Dwayne Richardson, Cassio Ware
- Vocal recording – Shon Lawon
- Production – David Guetta, Giorgio Tuinfort, Fred Riesterer
- Mastering – Brian "Big Bass" Gardner

== Charts ==
=== Weekly charts ===
Weekly chart performance for "Wet"
Chart (2010–11)	Peak position
Australia (ARIA)	1
Austria (Ö3 Austria Top 40)	1
Belgium (Ultratop 50 Flanders)	2
Belgium (Ultratop 50 Wallonia)	1
Brazil (Billboard Hot 100 Airplay)	24
Brazil (Billboard Hot Pop & Popular)	6
Canada Hot 100 (Billboard)	25
CIS Airplay (TopHit) David Guetta Remix	1
Czech Republic Airplay (ČNS IFPI)	2
Denmark (Tracklisten)	10
Finland (Suomen virallinen lista)	3
France (SNEP) David Guetta remix	1
Germany (GfK)	2
Greece Digital Songs (Billboard)	6
Hungary (Dance Top 40)	5
Hungary (Rádiós Top 40)	6
Ireland (IRMA)	3
Israel International Airplay (Media Forest)	7
Italy (FIMI)	15
Luxembourg Digital Songs (Billboard)	1
Mexico Anglo (Monitor Latino)	13
New Zealand (Recorded Music NZ)	5
Netherlands (Dutch Top 40)	5
Netherlands (Single Top 100)	6
Norway (VG-lista)	10
Romania (Romanian Top 100)	4
Poland (Dance Top 50)	6
Russia Airplay (TopHit) David Guetta Remix	1
Scottish Singles Sales (Official Charts)	6
Slovakia Airplay (ČNS IFPI)	2
Spain (Promusicae)	17
Spain Airplay (PROMUSICAE)	15
Switzerland (Schweizer Hitparade)	2
Sweden (Sverigetopplistan)	9
UK Dance (Official Charts)	2
UK Singles (Official Charts)	4
US Bubbling Under Hot 100 Singles (Billboard)	13
US R&B/Hip-Hop Songs (Billboard)	40
US Rap Songs (Billboard)	18
US Hot Dance Club Songs (Billboard)	4

=== Year-end charts ===
Year-end chart performance for "Wet"
Chart (2011)	Position
Australia (ARIA)	13
Austria (Ö3 Austria Top 40)	3
Canada (Canadian Hot 100)	99
CIS (TopHit)	6
Denmark (Tracklisten)	45
France (SNEP)	10
Germany (Official German Charts)	7
Greece (IFPI Greece)	92
Hungary (Rádiós Top 40)	31
New Zealand (Recorded Music NZ)	35
Poland (Dance Top 50)	12
Romania (Romanian Top 100)	32
Russia Airplay (TopHit)	3
Spain (PROMUSICAE)	50
Switzerland (Schweizer Hitparade)	11
UK Singles (OCC)	19

== Certifications ==
Region	Certification	Certified units/sales
Australia (ARIA)	4× Platinum	280,000^{^}
Austria (IFPI Austria)	Platinum	30,000^{*}
Belgium (BRMA)	Gold	15,000^{*}
Denmark (IFPI Danmark)	Platinum	90,000^{‡}
Finland (Musiikkituottajat)	Gold	5,075
Germany (BVMI)	3× Gold	450,000^{‡}
Italy (FIMI)	Platinum	30,000^{*}
New Zealand (RMNZ)	Platinum	15,000^{*}
Sweden (GLF)	Platinum	40,000^{‡}
Switzerland (IFPI Switzerland)	Platinum	30,000^{^}
United Kingdom (BPI)	Platinum	600,000^{*}
Streaming
Denmark (IFPI Danmark)	Gold	50,000^{†}
^{*} Sales figures based on certification alone.^{^} Shipments figures based on certification alone.^{‡} Sales+streaming figures based on certification alone.^{†} Streaming-only figures based on certification alone.

== Release history ==
Country	Date	Type
United States	January 11, 2011	Rhythmic airplay
United Kingdom	March 4, 2011	Digital download
Germany	April 1, 2011	CD single
