= Keen'V =

French singer

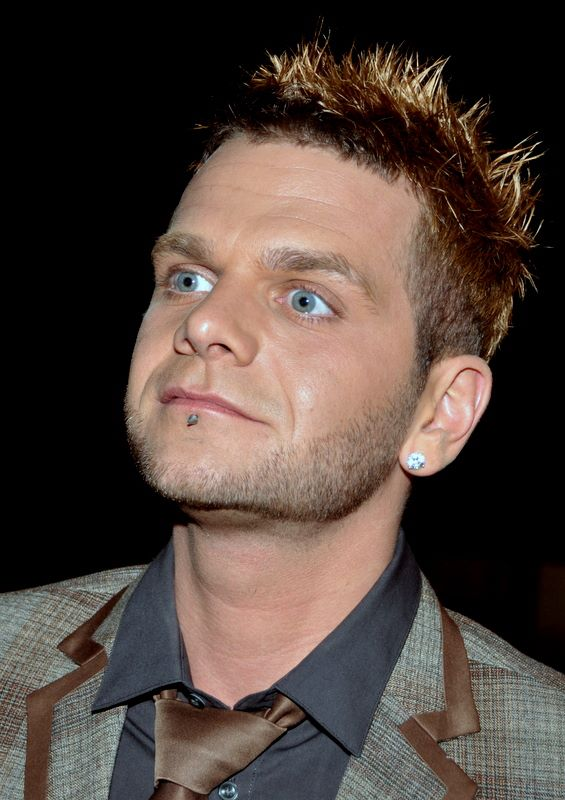
- Keen'v in January 2013 at the NRJ Music Awards ceremony.

Background information
- Born: Kevin Bonnet; 31 January 1983 (age 43); Rouen, France
- Genres: Dancehall reggae, ragga, R&B
- Occupation: Singer
- Years active: 2008–present
- Label: Universal Music
- Website: www.keenv.com

Kevin Bonnet (French pronunciation: [kevin bɔne]; born 31 January 1983), better known as Keen'V, earlier Keen V, is a French ragga musician. He made his breakthrough with the single "J'aimerais trop" in 2011, peaking at number 3 on the French Singles Chart.

== Biography ==
Kevin Bonnet was born on January 31, 1983, in Rouen, Seine-Maritime, France. He studied at the André Maurois college in La Saussaye and then at the Ferdinand Buisson high school in Elbeuf. Subsequently, he became a volunteer firefighter in Amfreville-la-Campagne, and DJ and entertainer at the "Moulin Rose" nightclub in Belbeuf and César's in Gournay-en-Bray. The beginnings of Keen'v are made at the "Moulin Rose", the DJ of the discotheque offers him to take the turntables and Kévin accepts the offer. Because the public appreciates his performance, the singer decides to return and finds himself alone in front of an audience for the first time.

In 2005, he met the composer Fabrice Vanvert (also known as Fab'V), with whom he composed the songs Loco la salsa and Soca soca te quiero, and performed in around fifty nightclubs in France. He met singers Obed and L'Rayan and together, they released a music video, Dancehall Musik, composed by Fab'V. A few months later, he met DJ Yaz who asked him to become his producer. He then obtains a contract at Universal Music which allows him to release new titles. In 2007, he met Toy Nawaach, a dancer from Limoges who would become his sidekick on stage.

Beginning on 15 April 2024, Keen'v is the host of the new game show "The Song" in France on the NRJ television station.

== Discography ==
=== Albums ===
| Year | Album | Charts | | | Label | Credit | Notes |
| Year | Album | FRA | BEL (Wa) | SWI | Label | Credit | Notes |
|---|---|---|---|---|---|---|---|
| 2008 | Phenom'N | 88 | — | — | ULM/Universal | Credited as Keen V | Album rereleased in 2010 with additional tracks |
| 2011 | Carpe Diem | 9 | — | — | Universal | Credited as Keen'V | |
| 2012 | La vie est belle | 2 | 9 | — | Universal | Credited as Keen V | |
| 2013 | Ange ou démon | 1 | 7 | 81 | AZ | Credited as Keen'V | |
| 2014 | Saltimbanque | 1 | — | — | AZ | Credited as Keen'V | |
| 2015 | Là oú le vent me mène | 1 | 12 | 44 | Warner | Credited as Keen'V | |
| 2017 | 7 | 1 | 3 | 32 | | Credited as Keen'V | |
| 2019 | Thérapie | 2 | 13 | 93 | | Credited as Keen'V | |
| 2021 | Rêver | 2 | 160 | 60 | Parlophone | Credited as Keen'V | |
| 2022 | Diamant | 1 | 15 | 75 | Parlophone | Credited as Keen'V | |
| 2023 | Best-Of: 15ème anniversaire | — | 171 | — | Parlophone | Credited as Keen'V | |

=== Singles ===
| Year | Single | Charts | | Notes | Album |
| Year | Single | FRA | BEL (Wa) | Notes | Album |
|---|---|---|---|---|---|
| 2009 | "Le son qui bam bam" | 19 | — | Credited as Keen V | Phenom'N (only in the 2010 rerelease) |
| 2011 | "J'aimerais trop" (featuring SAP) | 3 | 21 | Credited as Keen'V | Carpe Diem |
| 2011 | "Prince charmant" | 21 | 71* | Credited as Keen'V | Carpe Diem (only in the rerelease edition) |
| 2012 | "Les mots" | 15 | 54* | Credited as Keen'V | La vie est belle |
| 2012 | "Petite Émilie" | 34 | — | Credited as Keen'V | La vie est belle |
| 2012 | "Ma vie au soleil" | 22 | 38 | | La vie est belle |
| 2012 | "Elle t'a maté (Fatoumata)" | 42 | — | | La vie est belle |
| 2013 | "Ça va le faire" | 64 | 80* | Credited as Keen'V | Ange ou démon |
| 2013 | "La vie du bon côté" (featuring Lorelei B) | 6 | 31 | Credited as Keen'V | Ange ou démon |
| 2013 | "Moti'V" | — | 75* | Credited as Keen'V | Ange ou démon |
| 2014 | "Dis-moi oui (Marina)" | 10 | 44 | Credited as Keen'V | Saltimbanque |
| 2014 | "Certains m'appellent" | 89 | — | Credited as Keen'V | Saltimbanque |
| 2014 | "Saltimbanque" | 86 | — | Credited as Keen'V | Saltimbanque |
| 2014 | "J'me bats pour toi" | 65 | — | Credited as Keen'V | Saltimbanque |
| 2015 | "Un monde meilleur" | 50 | 50 | Credited as Keen'V | Là où le vent me mène |
| 2016 | "Rien qu'une fois" | 27 | 36 | Credited as Keen'V | Là où le vent me mène |
| 2016 | "Celle qu'il te faut" (featuring Glory) | 70 | — | Credited as Keen'V | Là où le vent me mène (Summer Edition) |
| 2017 | "Elle a" | 31 | — | Credited as Keen'V | 7 |
| 2017 | "Le chemin de la vie" | 125 | — | Credited as Keen'V | 7 |
| 2017 | "Un métier sérieux" | 164 | — | Credited as Keen'V | 7 |
| 2017 | "Le plus beau des cadeaux" (feat. Lorelei B) | — | — | | 7 |
| 2020 | "Quoi qu'il arrive" (feat. Magic System) | — | — | | |
| 2022 | "Outété" | — | 47 | | |

*Did not appear in the official Belgian Ultratop 50 charts, but rather in the bubbling under Ultratip charts. Positions in the table above reflect actual Ultratip positions plus 50 additional positions added.

== Awards ==
- During NRJ Music Awards 2012, he received the award for "Francophone Revelation of the Year".
