= Colonel Reyel =

French singer

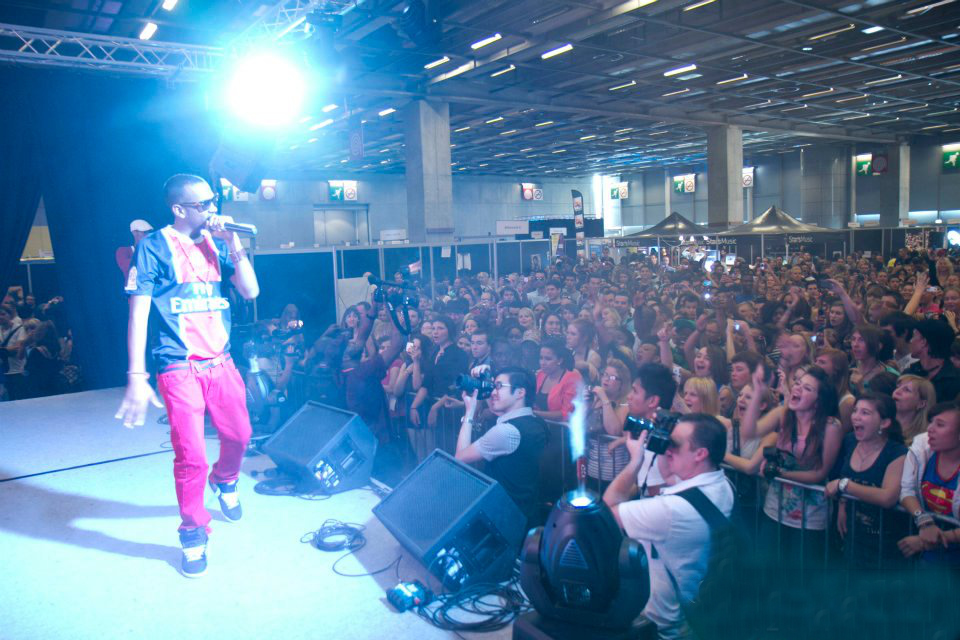

Background information
- Born: Rémy Ranguin; October 5, 1984 (age 41); Saint-Mandé, Val-de-Marne, France
- Origin: Guadeloupe
- Genres: R&B; dancehall; pop; electro
- Occupation: Singer
- Instrument: Vocals
- Years active: 2004–present
- Formerly of: Septentrional Crew

Rémy Ranguin better known by his stage name Colonel Reyel (born 5 October 1984) is a French singer. His 2011 album Au Rapport reached the top of the French Albums Chart and two singles from the album, "Celui..." and "Toutes les nuits" topped the French Singles Chart in two consecutive weeks in February–March 2011. In June 2011, Au Rapport went platinum. He is of Guadeloupe origin.

== Career ==
Rémy Ranguin chose the military title "Colonel" as a tribute and continuing the tradition of great dancehall artists with similar military titles (like Admiral T, Lieutenant, Caporal Nigga, Kporal Maïky and Sergent). The pseudonyme "Reyel" is a creole version of French word "réel" (real in English).

In 2004, when he was just 20, he joined the group Septentrional Crew. After a visit to the Antilles the same year, he became a freestyle dancehall act and with his band found some success. His work from this period was released in a number of compilations including in Overdoze Riddim. As members of the band started solo careers, Colonel Reyel collected his own materials that he included in his 2008 Boomaz Mixtape Vol 1 including the popular "Crise de l'emploi". He collaborated in studio recording Scartik Rekordz including "Killa" (solo), "Destiny" with Twent and "Don Dada" featuring Twent & XéLo. In 2009, he appeared in the compilation Sound Storm with "Il faut se battre" featuring Josita.

In 2010, the big Wagram label proposed a summer launch of Colonel Reyel ragga / zouk works mixed by DJ Doug, who became a regular at almost all the live shows of Colonel Reyel. "Celui..." based on a riddim of DJ Doug, and produced by Krys was a huge No. 1 hit first in 2010 on iTunes downloads, followed by an official launch of the single in February 2011. It also became a Top 10 hit in Belgium closely followed by "Toutes les nuits", also a chart topping single for him in March 2011.

The album entitled Au rapport was released on 11 April 2011 and went straight to No. 1. He recorded a remixed version of "Celui..." with amended lyrics in support of the faltering French Skyrock radio station and free radio in general. He was also featured with Mister You in "Mets-toi à l'aise", and with Bob Sinclar in "Me Not a Gangsta".

In summer of 2011, he released a third single "Aurélie" about a 16-year-old pregnant girl who decides to keep the baby conceived out of wedlock proved controversial and was seen as an anti-abortion promotion. The song was picked up by Proviefrance and featured on their website. Some radio stations refused to play the single, and there were many parodies online. But still the single reached No. 6 on the French Singles Chart.

In September 2011, Colonel Reyel released the single "Dis-moi oui" featuring Krys, which again proved controversial with allegations he had plagiarized Rihanna's song "S&M". He was also on the defensive after being accused of using too much "auto-tune" to alter his voice.

== Discography ==
=== Albums ===
Year	Album	Charts		Certification
Year	Album	BEL Wa	FR	Certification
2011	Au rapport	2	1	Platinum
2012	Soldat de l'amour	87	43	

Others

- 2011: Au rapport (Collectors' edition) (with 4 additional tracks)

=== Singles ===
Year	Single	Charts			Certification	Album
Year	Single	BEL Wa	FR	SWI	Certification	Album
2011	"Celui..."	9	1	—		Au rapport
2011	"Toutes les nuits"	13	1	—		Au rapport
2011	"Aurélie"	9	6	61		Au rapport
2011	"Ma Star"	—	37	—		Au rapport
2011	"Dis-moi oui" (feat. Krys)	—	18	—		Au rapport
2012	"Toi et moi"	—	50	—		Soldat de l'amour

Other songs

Four songs in Support (2009 compilation) – "Il Faut Se Battre" (with Josita), "Chanje A Tan", "Lyrikal Tsunami" and "Texto

=== Collaborations ===
Featured in

Year	Single	Charts		Certification	Album
Year	Single	BEL Wa	FR	Certification	Album
2010	"Big Woman" (Delia feat. Colonel Reyel & Xp)	—	—		
2011	"Fiesta" (remix) (Strikem feat. Colonel Reyel)	—	—		
2011	"Mets-toi à l'aise" (Mister You feat. Colonel Reyel)	—	37		
2011	"Me Not a Gangsta" (Bob Sinclar feat. Colonel Reyel & Mr Shammi)	21	44		

=== Appearances ===
- 2009: "Il faut se battre" (with Josita) / "Chanje a tan" / "Lyrikal Tsunami" / "Texto" (4 tracks in a compilation album of 28 tracks entitled Sound Storm)
