= Logobi =

Ivorian music genre and type of dance

Logobi (also written in French as Logobie) is an Ivorian musical genre that accompanies certain dance moves. It first appeared in Côte d'Ivoire in 1986 and was popularized initially in university campuses in Abidjan. The dance is based on Côte d'Ivoire's traditional Zouglou dance with new elements added. "Zouglou" and "logobi" are used interchangeably, although "zouglou" is more ancient and "logobi" is a more modern development.

== Etymology ==
The literal meaning of "logobi" in Nouchi (an Ivorian slang) is to earn money through cunning, crafty and often trickery means to earn a fortune. Many of the dance moves accompanying the music are depictions of bandits, hooligans and street gangs, including fight moves, use of weapons, secret gang signals and sexual overtures. The music and dance try to convey the social realities of poverty and misery aspiring at the same time to a happier, more positive future and longing for prosperity, justice and peace. It has also been dubbed "la danse des gros bras" (literally, the dance of big arms). The European, particularly French, development of "logobi" has also included electric and tecktonic elements to the music, diluting the gang aspects of the original dance by gearing it towards children and young adults.

== Artists ==
Since its inception, the number of artists in the genre has proliferated not only in Côte d'Ivoire and neighboring African countries but in Europe, and particularly France, most notably within the African immigrant communities. Well-known artists playing "logobi" music include Les Garagistes, Espoir 2000, Magic System, Petit Yodé and l'Enfant Siro, Molière, Les Pivoines, Les Patrons, Les Mercenaires, Anti Palu, Sur-choc, Les Salopard, Dezy Champillon, Major and Zabson, C ki'sa, LogobiGT and Yang Systeme.

Successful singles and music videos include the hits "Djolo National" by Yang Systeme, "Logobi" by Les Mantanien, and "Logobi" by Les Youlés.

== See also ==
- Zouglou
