= Alizée discography =

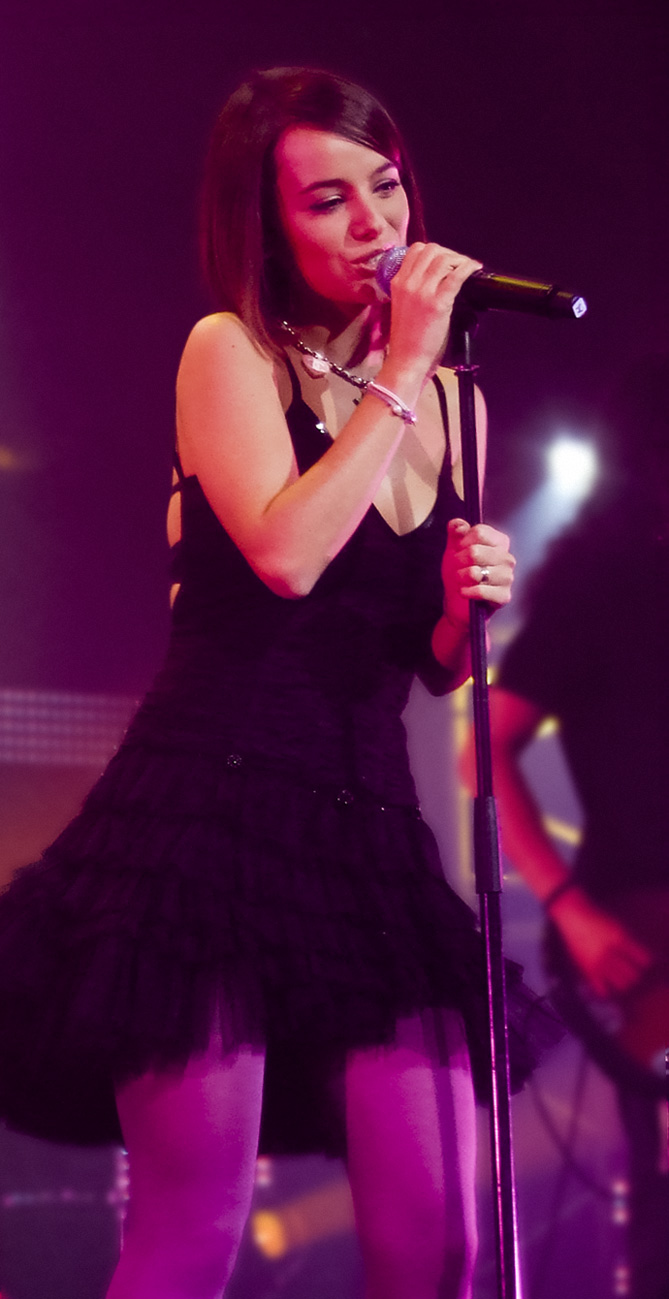
- Alizée performing in Strasbourg in 2008
- Studio albums: 6
- Soundtrack albums: 1
- Live albums: 1
- Compilation albums: 1
- Singles: 15
- Music videos: 20
- Collaboration: 1
- Tours: 2

French recording artist Alizée has released six studio albums, seventeen singles and five promotional singles; all the released singles have a music video associated with them.

Alizée's range of musical genres and style includes pop, world, rock, house, electronica among others. She became well known through her participation in the Granies de Star show. Her increased popularity led to a contract with Mylène Farmer and Laurent Boutonnat, her ex-mentors signing a contract with Polydor Records a division of Universal Records. Her debut single, "Moi... Lolita", was released in 2000 and topped the French Single Charts and was successful in many countries including the UK, Germany, Japan, Italy, Spain and others. Jacotey's first studio album, Gourmandises (2000), was released shortly after. The album was highly successful, earning a two times platinum certification in France and platinum in Europe selling to 2002 plus of one million records worldwide. The album was nominated for the Album of the Year honour at the Victoires de la Musique. The follow-up singles—"L'Alizé", "Parler tout bas" and "Gourmandises"— repeated her success; "L'Alizé" peaked at number one on the SNEP being certificated platinum in France.

In 2003, Alizée's second major release, Mes courants électriques, saw a genre shift for her, having more of an electropop and rock feel, rather than the soft synthpop and chanson influences of the first one, including English versions of four songs. The album debuted at number two in the French Albums Chart, and was heavily promoted in the Asian market, certificating gold twice in France, becoming very successful in Japan, South Korea, China and other charts. The first single from it, "J'en ai marre !", also debuted at number four rising to the next spot on the French Singles Chart, where it remained for nine consecutive weeks. Other singles include "J'ai pas vingt ans", another top twenty single in France both also released in English versions to appeal to the English-speaking market, "À contre-courant", which became her third single of the album, peaked at 22 in the French Singles Charts and also charted in Belgium and Switzerland.

In 2004, promoting her first tour, a video of the song "Amélie m'a dit" was released, for the promotion of Alizée's live album Alizée en concert, even though it was not released as a single; for its promotion, a video of the song featuring a collection of clips from Alizée's performances during her tour were used.

After a three-year hiatus, a time spent out of the media limelight, Alizée returned in 2007 with a new album, Psychédélices, the first one to be made without the creative supervision of her former mentors, the first single extracted from the album was "Mademoiselle Juliette", officially released in September 2007, the single reached the number four in Belgium (Wallonia) charts, twenty two in French Singles Chart, it also peaked in Russian singles charts, "Fifty-Sixty" was released as the album's second and last international single in February peaking at number 23 in Flanders, Belgium, the cover version of La Isla Bonita was released just for France being very successful in the country reaching number eight, finally the album was released on December of the same year, the album was not considered a total commercial success in France compared with her last albums, where it reached 2nd place on the download charts and 16th place on the physical album sale charts. The album was more successful in Mexico peaking the number 15 in the albums chart and the number one in the international albums chart, also certified gold in Russia, Mexico and her native France selling plus of 200,000 copies worldwide.

In 2010, Une enfant du siècle was released, an album praised by critics, but commercially failure reaching the 24 spot in the French Albums Chart.

Released in March 2013, Alizée's fifth studio album, 5 received the acclaim from the critics, still with a continuous promotion including their two first extracts "À cause de l'automne" and "Je veux bien".

== Albums ==
=== Studio albums ===
List of studio albums, with selected chart positions and certifications
Title	Album details	Peak chart positions											Certifications
Title	Album details	FRA	AUT	BEL (WA)	FIN	GER	ITA	JPN	MEX	NDL	SWI	POL	Certifications
Gourmandises	Released: 21 November 2000; Label: Universal, Polydor; Formats: CD, cassette	1	40	7	26	29	27	40	—	36	27	13	SNEP: 2× Platinum; BEA: Gold; IFPI SWI: Gold
Mes courants électriques	Released: 28 March 2003; Label: Polydor; Formats: CD, cassette	2	—	9	—	26	—	1	—	—	13	41	SNEP: 2× Gold
Psychédélices	Released: 3 December 2007; Label: RCA, Sony Music, Wisteria Song; Formats: CD, digital download	16	—	50	—	—	—	—	15	—	99	—	SNEP: Gold; AMPROFON: Gold
Une enfant du siècle	Released: 29 March 2010; Label: Sony Music, Jive, Epic, Institutibles, Wisteria Song; Formats: CD, digital download, 7" vinyl box set	24	—	60	—	—	—	—	22	—	—	—	
5	Released: 25 March 2013; Label: Sony Music; Formats: CD, digital download	23	—	41	—	—	—	—	—	—	—	—	
Blonde	Released: 23 June 2014; Label: Sony Music; Formats: CD, digital download	19	—	19	—	—	—	—	—	—	79	—	
"—" denotes releases that did not chart or were not released in that country.

=== Live albums ===
List of live albums, with selected chart positions and certifications
Title	Album details	Peak chart positions			Certifications
Title	Album details	FRA	BEL (WA)	MEX	Certifications
Alizée en concert	Release: 20 June 2004; Label: Polydor; Formats: CD/DVD	38	70	8	SNEP: Gold; AMPROFON: Gold

=== Compilation albums ===
List of compilation albums, with selected chart positions
Title	Album details	Peak chart positions
Title	Album details	MEX
Tout Alizée	Released: 25 December 2007; Label: Universal; Formats: CD, digital download	22

== Singles ==
=== As lead artist ===
List of singles, with selected chart positions and certifications
Title	Year	Peak chart positions										Certifications	Album
Title	Year	AUT	BEL (FL)	BEL (WA)	FRA	GER	ITA	NDL	SPA	SWI	UK	Certifications	Album
"Moi... Lolita"	2000	5	4	2	2	5	1	2	1	11	9	SNEP: Diamond; NVPI: Gold; IFPI SWI: Platinum	Gourmandises
"L'Alizé"	2000	52	12	5	1	43	—	63	—	23	—	SNEP: Platinum	Gourmandises
"Parler tout bas"	2001	—	—	15	12	—	—	—	—	—	—	SNEP: Gold	Gourmandises
"Gourmandises"	2001	—	—	21	14	—	—	—	—	70	—	SNEP: Silver	Gourmandises
"J'en ai marre!"	2003	43	18	5	4	21	23	—	11	5	—	SNEP: Gold; BEA: Gold	Mes courants électriques
"J'ai pas vingt ans"	2003	60	53	20	17	59	—	—	19	60	—		Mes courants électriques
"À contre-courant"	2003	—	60	20	22	—	—	—	—	64	—		Mes courants électriques
"Mademoiselle Juliette"	2007	—	—	4	22	—	—	—	—	—	—		Psychédélices
"Fifty-Sixty"	2008	—	—	23	—	—	—	—	—	—	—		Psychédélices
"Limelight"	2010	—	—	—	—	—	—	—	—	—	—		Une enfant du siècle
"Les collines (Never Leave You)"	2010	—	—	—	—	—	—	—	—	—	—		Une enfant du siècle
"À cause de l'automne"	2012	—	—	42	131	—	—	—	—	—	—		5
"Je veux bien"	2013	—	—	—	—	—	—	—	—	—	—		5
"Blonde"	2014	—	—	25	63	—	—	—	—	—	—		Blonde
"Alcaline"	2014	—	—	—	172	—	—	—	—	—	—		Blonde
"—" denotes releases that did not chart or were not released in that country.

=== As featured artist ===
Title	Year	Peak chart positions		Album
Title	Year	FRA	BEL (WA)	Album
"Des ricochets" (with Collectif Paris-Africa)	2011	5	47	Collectif Paris-Africa pour l'UNICEF
"Clara veut la Lune" (Alain Chamfort featuring Alizée)	2012	—	—	Elles & Lui
"Dear Darlin'" (Olly Murs featuring Alizée)	2013	—	—	Right Place Right Time
"—" denotes releases that did not chart or were not released in that country.

== DVD releases ==
Title	DVD details	Notes
Alizée en concert	Released: 18 October 2004 (France) / 22 February 2008(Mexico); Label: Polydor Records / Requiem Publishing; Format: DVD	Contains En concert Tour compilation of live concerts of Alizée's first tour between September 2003 and January 2004 in France, Belgium and Switzerland. At least footage from L'Olympia (August/September 2003) and Le Zénith (17 January 2004) in Paris can be recognized, also some footage from Forest National in Brussels (12 October 2003). The Mexican edition has very poor quality as it was released as letterboxed NTSC format and only has 2.0 stereo soundtrack (when French has 5.1 Dolby Digital).
Psychédélices Edition Limitée (CD+DVD)	Released: 3 December 2007; Label: Wisteria Song / RCA Records / Sony BMG; Format: CD/DVD	The CD contains 11 songs (same as the normal edition). The DVD contains only a short video story called Spychédélices. On the video Alizée is driving a 1970 Mustang convertible. The video is shaky all the time and shows only glimpses of Alizée and the car. On the background is playing the instrumental bridge of Psychédélices song. Also, over the instrumental is narration by Jean Fauque, one of the writers for the album. The video was also released on Alizée's official website, but without the voice over and using two different songs on the background.
Psychedelices CD+DVD	Released: 25 June 2008; Label: Wisteria Song / RCA Records / Sony BMG; Format: CD/DVD	The CD contains the normal 11 songs with four bonus songs (La Isla Bonita and three remixes of Fifty-Sixty). The DVD contains four music videos (Mademoiselle Juliette, Fifty Sixty, and two remix videos of Fifty Sixty), plus a video documentary of Alizée's trip to Mexico. The documentary was originally released on internet (by Prodigy MSN) and it's divided into four parts: day 1 – tourism, day 2 – Mexican press, day 3 – promoting on radio and TV, and day 4 – autograph dedication event.

== Other appearances ==
Title	Year	Other artist(s)	Album
"Le Tourbillon"	2013	Tal	À l'infini (Deluxe Edition)
"Mon petit doigt m'a dit"	2013	Aldebert	Enfantillages 2
"Tendre rêve"	2014	none	We Love Disney 2
