= List of awards and nominations received by Alizée =

Alizée awards and nominations
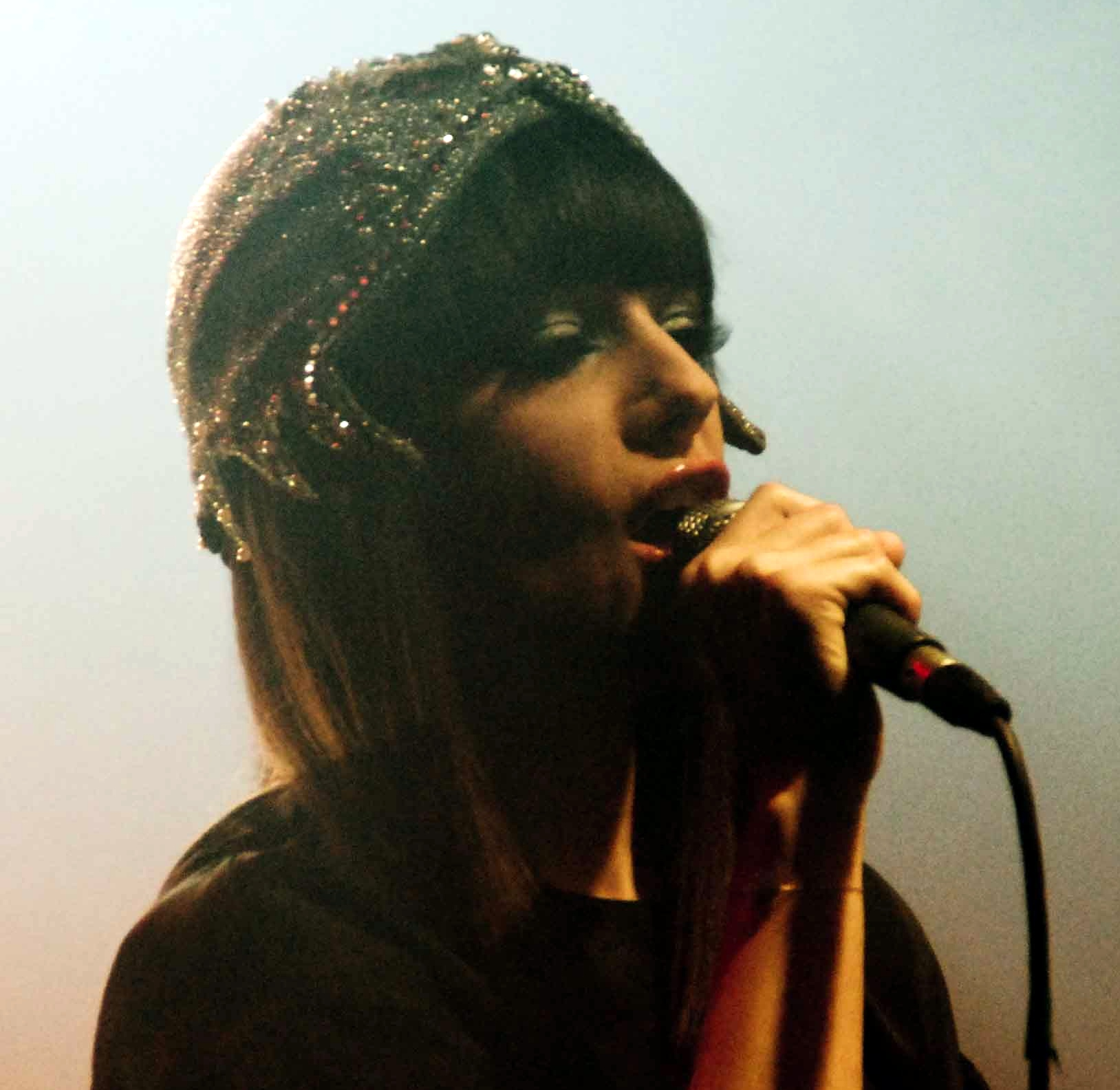
- Alizée performing Une enfant du siècle 2010. The album earned Alizée the pre-nomination to the Victoires de la Musique.
Awards and nominations
Award	Wins	Nominations
Ajaccio	1	0
Buzz Land Awards	0	1
Danse avec les stars	1	0
DMX Awards	2	0
Hit FM Awards	1	0
Laurier TV Awards	1	0
Lunas del Auditorio	1	0
M6 Awards	1	0
MTV Latin America Awards	0	1
NME Awards	1	0
NRJ Music Awards	2	1
Petite Pricesse	0	1
SACEM; Prix Vincent Scotto	1	0
Trophée des Anges	2	0
Victoires de la Musique	0	1
World Music Awards	1	1
- Totals
Awards won	15
Nominations	7

Alizée Jacotey (born 21 August 1984) is a French recording artist, known professionally as Alizée. She was born and raised in Ajaccio, Corsica.

She was discovered by Mylène Farmer, following her winning performance in the talent show, Graines de Star, in 1999. While collaborating with Mylène Farmer and Laurent Boutonnat, she recorded a series of albums that attained immense popularity by pushing the boundaries of lyrical content in mainstream popular music and imagery in her music videos, which became a fixture on NRJ, Europe 1, MTV, Virgin, and many others. Throughout her career, many of her songs have been in top 25 hit lists on the record charts, including "Moi... Lolita", "L'Alizé", "J'en ai marre!" "Gourmandises", "Mademoiselle Juliette", her cover version of "La Isla Bonita", "Parler Tout Bas", "Les collines (never leave you)" and "À cause de l'automne".

Her first two albums were composed by Laurent Boutonnat and written by Mylène Farmer. Her first album, Gourmandises, received Platinum certification within three months of release. After its international launch in 2001, Gourmandises was a success both in France and abroad, earning Alizée the distinction of being the highest selling female French singer in 2001. The album featured her most successful single "Moi... Lolita" which reached number one in several countries in Europe and East Asia, in the UK the song was acclaimed by the New Musical Express who recognised it with a "Single of the Week" award. It became a rare example of a foreign-language song to chart highly in the UK, peaking at number 9.

Gourmandises was followed by a second studio album, Mes Courants Électriques, in 2003. Following its release, Alizée toured during the fall of 2003, performing in 43 concerts throughout France, Belgium and Switzerland.

Alizée married fellow French singer Jérémy Chatelain in late 2003. Following her marriage, she took a hiatus from singing before returning with a new album, Psychédélices on 3 December 2007, which became most popular in Mexico.

Her fourth album titled Une enfant du siècle was released on 29 March 2010 this one of the most acclaimed by the critics. In early 2011 she recorded a duet with Alain Chamfort for his new album Elle & lui.

Released in March 2013, Alizée's fifth studio album, 5, received acclaim from the critics, still with a continuous promotion including the two first songs "À cause de l'automne" and "Je veux bien", her participation in Olly Murs single "Dear Darlin'"

According to the IFPI and SNEP, Alizée is one of the best-selling female French artist of the 21st century and the singer with most exports out of France.

== Ajaccio ==
The Medal of Ajaccio ("Médaille d'Ajaccio" in French) is issued by the Territorial Collectivity of Corsica. It is the highest civil honor in Corsica.

Year	Nominated Work	Award	Result
2013	Alizée	Medal of Ajaccio	Honored

== Buzz Land Awards ==
Year	Nominated Work	Award	Result
2013	Alizée	Best Female Artist	Nominated

== Lauriers TV Awards ==
Year	Nominated Work	Award	Result
2013	Alizée	Lead female who participated in a Program of Entertainment	Nominated

== Petite Princesse (France) ==
Year	Nominated Work	Award	Result	Ref.
2000	Alizée	Best Singer	Nominated	

== Victoires de la Musique ==
The Victoires de la Musique is an annual French award ceremony where the Victoire accolade is delivered by the French Ministry of Culture to recognize the best musical artists of the year. It is the highest musical recognition in France.

Year	Nominated Work	Award	Result	Ref.
2001	Herself	Female Revelation of the Year	Nominated	

== Danse avec les stars ==
Year	Nominated Work	Award	Result
2013	Herself	Dancer of the Year	Won

== DMX Awards (WEB) ==
Year	Nominated Work	Award	Result	Ref.
2001	Moi...Lolita	Best Francophone Song	Won	
2001	Moi...Lolita	Best International Hit never released in U.S.A.	Won	

== Graines de star (France) ==
Year	Nominated Work	Award	Result	Ref.
1999	Alizée	Mellieur Grainer	Won	

== Hit FM Award (Russia) ==
Year	Nominated Work	Award	Result	Ref.
2001	Moi... Lolita	French Song of the Year	Won	

== Las Lunas del Auditorio (Mexico) ==
Year	Nominated Work	Award	Result
2008	Herself	Best International Pop Artist	Won

== M6 Awards ==
Year	Nominated Work	Award	Result	Ref.
2000	Herself	French Revelation of the Year	Won	

== MTV Latin America Awards ==
Year	Nominated Work	Award	Result	Ref.
2008	Herself	International Revelation	Nominated	

== NME Awards (UK) ==
Year	Nominated Work	Award	Result	Ref.
2001	Moi... Lolita	Single of the Week	Won	

== NRJ Music Awards ==
Year	Nominated Work	Award	Result	Ref.
2001	Herself	French Revelation of the Year	Won	
2001	Herself	Best Web Site	Won	
2002	Herself	Francophone Female Artist of the Year	Nominated	

== SACEM ==
Year	Nominated Work	Award	Result	Ref.
2001	Alizée	Prix Vincent-Scotto	Honored	

== Trophée des Anges (France) ==
Year	Nominated Work	Award	Result	Ref.
2000	Herself	Artist of the Year Artiste de l'année	Won	
2001	Herself	Artist of the Year Artiste de l'année	Won	

== World Music Awards ==
The World Music Awards is an international awards show founded in 1989 under patronage of Albert II, Prince of Monaco and is based in Monte-Carlo. Awards are presented to the World's best-selling Artists in the various categories and to the best-selling Artists from each major territory. Sales figures are provided by the International Federation of the Phonographic Industry (IFPI). Alizée has received one accolade in 2002.

Year	Nominated Work	Award	Result	Ref.
2002	Alizée	Best Seller French Female Artist	Won	
