= Tout Alizée =

Compilation album by Alizée
- Released: 10 December 2007
- Recorded: 2000–2002
- Genre: French pop
- Label: Universal

Alizée chronology
Psychédélices (2007)	Tout Alizée (2007)	Une enfant du siècle (2010)

Tout Alizée (English: Everything Alizée) is a compilation album released by French singer Alizée. The album was released to stores on 10 December 2007 in Mexico only, being a compilation released by Alizée's old music label Universal Music in an attempt to cash-in on her recent success in the country. The album was backed with a bonus DVD with some of her music videos.

== Track listing ==
CD

1. "Moi... Lolita"
2. "Gourmandises"
3. "L'Alizé"
4. "J.B.G."
5. "Parler tout bas"
6. "J'en ai marre!"
7. "À contre-courant"
8. "Hey! Amigo!"
9. "Youpidou"
10. "Amélie m'a dit"
11. "J'ai pas vingt ans!"
12. "Moi... Lolita" (Lola Extended Remix)
13. "Moi... Lolita" (Hello Helli T'es A Dance Remix)
14. "I'm Fed Up!" (Bubbly Club Remix)
15. "J'en ai marre!" (Soft Skin Club Mix)

DVD

1. "Gourmandises"
2. "Moi... Lolita"
3. "Parler tout bas"
4. "J'ai pas vingt ans!"
5. "I'm Not Twenty"
6. "J'en ai marre!"
7. "I'm Fed Up!"
8. Documentary: Tubes D'un Jour

== Charts ==
The album debuted at number sixty-two in the Mexican Top 100 Albums Chart, and number eighteen on the International Top 20 Albums Chart.

Chart	Peak position
Mexican Top 100 Albums Chart	22
Mexican International Top 20 Albums Chart	3
