= Alizée en concert =

Live album and video by Alizée
- Released: October 18, 2004
- Recorded: 26 August 2003 – 17 January 2004 during Alizée's En concert Tour
- Genres: French pop; dance-pop
- Length: 73:19
- Label: Polydor
- Producer: Paul Van Parys

Alizée chronology
| Mes courants electriques (2003) | Alizée en concert (2004) | Psychédélices (2007) |

Alizée en concert is the first live album by French recording artist Alizée. It was released on 18 October 2004 by Polydor Records and Requiem Publishing. The album chronicles Alizée's 2003-04 En concert Tour. It was recorded in several arenas and concert halls during the tour, including the prestigious L'Olympia hall in Paris and many cities such Lyon, Strasbourg, Montpellier and many other dates of the tour. The DVD release contains the entire concert but the CD only includes sixteen live songs.

== Background ==
Following the 2003 release of Mes courants électriques, Alizée released her first live album, Alizée en concert. On 15 August 2003, while she was in Japan promoting her Mes courants électriques studio album, she announced that she would return to France with her En concert Tour including all the European French-speaking area including Belgium and Switzerland. It was the first release from her artistical godmother company, Requiem Publishing and was released in both DVD and CD formats, capturing the tour. The DVD release consists of the full eighteen song set list of the tour, while the CD captures sixteen songs.

The album entered the charts and after spending months in the top 100, went on to peak at number eight on the main albums chart and number four on the international albums chart. The album became the 29th best-selling album of the year.

The compilation was re-released in early 2007 in Mexico by Universal Music as a CD+DVD release, after the unexpected success of Alizée's studio albums. With the re-release and renewed interest, the songs climbed up the music charts in the country. The album became a hit, peaking at number four in the International Chart on 28 May 2007, and number eight on the main albums chart. En concert became the 29th best-selling album of the year. The album has a Gold certification for shipments over 50,000 copies only in Mexico.

=== Technical Issues ===
A DVD of the same performances was released simultaneously. The region-free disc was among the first DVDs to offer a video shot with high-definition cameras, and has Dolby Digital, DTS 5.1, and stereo audio tracks. DVD extras include footage of Alizée's concert rehearsals, the making of her video, and her trip to Japan.

== International DVD ==
- Director: Pierre Stine.
- Lyrics: Mylène Farmer.
- Music: Laurent Boutonnat & Loïc Pontieux (except "Intralizée" music by Loïc Pontieux).
- Publisher: Requiem Publishing.

=== Chapter list ===
1. "Intralizée"
2. "L'Alizé"
3. "Hey ! Amigo !"
4. "Toc de mac"
5. "J'en ai marre !"
6. "Lui ou toi"
7. "Gourmandises"
8. "L'e-mail a des ailes"
9. "Mon maquis"
10. "J.B.G."
11. "Moi... Lolita"
12. "Amélie m'a dit"
13. "Parler tout bas"
14. "C'est trop tard"
15. "Youpidou"
16. "Tempête"
17. "À contre-courant"
18. "J'ai pas vingt ans"
19. "Générique de fin"

=== Bonus ===
- Clip "Amélie m'a dit" (Live)
- En repetition
- Alizée au Japon
- Sur le tournage de "L'Alizé"
- Sur le tournage de "J'en ai marre!"
- Spots "Alizée en concert"

== CD Edition ==
=== Track listing ===
1. "Intralizée" – 1:48
2. "L'Alizé" – 4:40
3. "Hey! Amigo!" – 3:53
4. "Toc de mac" – 4:28
5. "J'en ai marre!" – 5:44
6. "Lui ou toi" – 4:18
7. "Gourmandises" – 4:23
8. "Mon maquis" – 4:52
9. "J.B.G." – 3:28
10. "Moi... Lolita" – 5:50
11. "Amélie m'a dit" – 3:51
12. "Parler tout bas" – 5:19
13. "C'est trop tard" – 4:21
14. "Youpidou" – 4:15
15. "Tempête" – 4:42
16. "À contre-courant" – 7:27
- Lyrics: Mylène Farmer.
- Music: Laurent Boutonnat & Loïc Pontieux.
- Publisher: Requiem Publishing.

== Credits ==
- Alizée – Vocals
- Loïc Pontieux – Drums, musical direction
- Philippe Chayeb – Bass
- Jean-Marie Negozio – Keyboards
- Jean-Philippe Schevingt – Keyboards
- Olivier Marly – Guitars
- Gil Gimenez – Guitars
- Valérie Belinga, Brenda della Valle – Chorus
- Laetitia Broqua, Sandrine Douarne, Stéphanie Muret, Audrey Talbot – Dancers

== Certifications ==
| Region | Certification | Certified units/sales |
|---|---|---|
| France (SNEP) video | Gold | 10,000^{*} |
| Mexico (AMPROFON) video | Gold | 10,000^{^} |
^{*} Sales figures based on certification alone.^{^} Shipments figures based on certification alone.

== Reception ==
- AllMusic link
