= En concert =

En concert may refer to:

== Albums ==
- En concert (Mylène Farmer album), a 1989 live album by Mylène Farmer
- En concert (Alizée album), a 2004 live album by Alizée
  - En concert Tour, a 2003–2004 concert tour by Alizée
- En concert (Jack Johnson album), a 2009 live album by Jack Johnson
- En concert, a 2011 album by Calogero
