= I'm Fed Up =

I'm Fed Up may refer to:

- I'm Fed Up, biography of Edoardo Bennato
- "I'm Fed Up", song by Ike and Tina Turner
- I'm Fed Up! (Alizée song) (French title: J'en ai marre!)
