= J'ai pas vingt ans =

Single by Alizée

from the album Mes courants électriques
- Language: French
- Released: 3 June 2003
- Recorded: 2002
- Studio: Studio Guillaume Tell (Suresnes); Studio Caliphora; Studio Davout
- Genre: French pop
- Length: 4:23
- Label: Polydor
- Songwriters: Mylène Farmer; Laurent Boutonnat
- Producers: Mylène Farmer; Laurent Boutonnat

Alizée singles chronology
"J'en ai marre!" (2003)	"J'ai pas vingt ans" (2003)	"À contre-courant" (2003)

Music video
- "Alizée - J'ai pas vingt ans ! (Clip Officiel HD)" on YouTube

Music video
- "Alizée - I'm not twenty! (Official Video HD)" on YouTube

"J'ai pas vingt ans !" (English: "I'm not twenty!") is a song by French pop singer Alizée, released on 3 June 2003, as the second single for her second studio album, Mes courants électriques (2003), through the label Polydor. The song was written by Mylene Farmer and Boutonnat, and production was managed by Laurent Boutonnat and Farmer as well. Lyrically, the song addresses themes of youth, self-confidence, and the tension between age and perceived maturity. The lyrics convey a playful yet assertive response to adults who underestimate the narrator due to her age, while also highlighting the complexities and contradictions of adolescence.

Upon release, the single achieved moderate commercial success across several European markets. In France, the single peaked at number 17 and remained on the French Singles Chart for 22 weeks. It also performed well in Belgium (Wallonia), reaching number 20 and staying on the chart for 14 weeks. In Switzerland, it charted for 6 weeks with a peak position of number 60. The single entered the German Singles Chart at number 59 and remained for 3 weeks. In Spain, it reached number 19 and charted for 2 weeks, while in Poland it found notable success on radio, peaking at number 3 on the national airplay chart. "J'ai pas vingt ans !" also appeared on the charts in Austria and the Netherlands, peaking at number 60 in both countries and remaining for 3 and 6 weeks, respectively.

The music video features Alizée performing choreographed dance routines alongside a group of backup dancers in a minimalist, futuristic white set. The visual aesthetic emphasizes clean geometric elements and a modern design, complementing the energetic tone of the song. Alizée is seen wearing a sporty outfit that aligns with the song's themes of youth and self-assertion. The video incorporates a combination of wide shots, close-ups, and tracking movements, maintaining a fast-paced rhythm consistent with the track's upbeat tempo. The choreography is structured yet lighthearted, contributing to the overall visual representation of the song's lyrical themes.

== Background ==
On 21 November 2000, Alizée released her debut album, Gourmandises, in France, and released the album internationally on 13 March 2001. The album produced four singles, including the global top-five hits "Moi... Lolita," "L'Alizé," and "Gourmandises," each of which received notable commercial success. "Moi... Lolita" reached diamond status in France, while "L'Alizé" was certified platinum, and "Gourmandises" also achieved success, receiving significant chart positions across multiple countries. To promote "Gourmandises" and her subsequent album, Alizée embarked on the En concert Tour in late 2003, which helped boost the later success of Mes courants électriques. Music critics and scholars have highlighted the album's lasting influence on popular music, particularly for its role in reintroducing electronic music into the mainstream pop scene. Praised by critics as a standout in modern French pop, the album received widespread acclaim upon its release, with reviewers highlighting the singer's vocal performance and musical direction.

== Composition ==
"J'ai pas vingt ans" is a French pop and electropop song by Alizée. The track was written by Mylène Farmer, with music and production handled by Laurent Boutonnat. Recording sessions took place in 2002 and 2003 in Paris, during the development of Alizée's second studio album, Mes courants électriques. Musically, the single features synthesizer-driven arrangements and electronic production while retaining a pop-oriented structure. Lyrically, the song explores themes of youth and self-assertion, portraying a young woman who, though not yet twenty, confidently claims her identity and independence. The song's tone combines playful irony with a sense of maturity, aligning with the lyrical style characteristic of Farmer's writing.

== Commercial performance ==
Upon release, the single performed well, charting in multiple countries. In France, the single peaked at number 17 on the French Singles Chart and remained on the chart for 22 weeks. It also charted in Belgium (Wallonia), reaching number 20 and staying for 14 weeks, and in Switzerland, where it peaked at number 60 and charted for 6 weeks. In Germany, the track entered the charts at number 59, remaining for 3 weeks. The single also appeared on the charts in Spain, peaking at number 19 for 2 weeks, and in Poland, where it reached number 3 on the airplay chart. Additionally, it charted in Austria, peaking at number 60 for 3 weeks, and in the Netherlands, where it peaked at number 60 for 6 weeks.

== Music video ==
The music video is about Alizée and her band playing the song on a stage. It was directed by Laurent Boutonnat and was released in May 2003 on M6.

== Formats and track listings ==
French CD Single

1. "J'ai pas vingt ans" – 4:15
2. "I'm Fed Up!" – 4:40

French CD maxi single

1. "J'ai pas vingt ans" (Single Version) – 4:15
2. "J'ai pas vingt ans" (Sfaction Club Remix) – 5:45
3. "J'ai pas vingt ans" (Attitude Dance Remix) – 4:10
4. "J'ai pas vingt ans" (Attitude Dub Mix) – 6:45

French 12" vinyl single

A Side:

1. "J'ai pas vingt ans" (Sfaction Club Remix) – 5:45

B Side:

1. "J'ai pas vingt ans" (Attitude Dance Remix) – 4:10

== Charts ==
=== Weekly charts ===
Chart (2003)	Peak Position
Austrian Singles Chart (Ö3 Austria)	60
Belgian Singles Chart (Ultratop Flanders)	53
Belgian Singles Chart (Ultratop Wallonia)	20
French Singles Chart (SNEP)	17
German Singles Chart (GfK)	59
Poland (Polish Airplay Chart)	3
Swiss Singles Chart (Swiss HitParade)	60
Spain Singles Chart (PROMUSICAE)	19
