= Mes courants électriques =

Album by Alizée

Studio album by Alizée
- Released: 18 March 2003
- Recorded: 2002/2003
- Studios: Studio Guillaume Tell (Suresnes); Calliphora Studio (Paris), Studio Davout (Paris, Ile-de-France)
- Genres: French pop; electro-pop; French Touch
- Length: 48:21
- Language: French
- Label: Polydor
- Producers: Mylène Farmer; Laurent Boutonnat

Alizée chronology
Gourmandises (2000)	Mes courants électriques (2003)	Alizée en concert (2004)

Alternative cover
- Asian edition

Singles from Mes courants électriques
- 1. "J'en ai marre!" Released: 21 February 2003; 2. "J'ai pas vingt ans!" Released: 3 June 2003; 3. "À contre-courant" Released: 7 October 2003

Mes courants électriques (English: My Electric Currents) is the second studio album by the French singer Alizée, released on 18 March 2003 through Polydor. The album was produced by Laurent Boutonnat and Mylène Farmer. The album's lyrics were written by Farmer. The music was composed by Boutonnat.

In France, the album debuted at number two on the SNEP Albums Chart and remained on the chart for over 25 weeks, earning a double gold certification from SNEP for sales surpassing 500,000 copies. The album reached the top 15 on the Oricon International Albums chart.

The album featured three singles: "J'en ai marre!" (released as "I'm fed up!" in some territories), "J'ai pas vingt ans" (released as "I'm not twenty!" in other territories), and "À contre-courant."

Alizée toured in 2003 to support her 2000 album Gourmandises in addition to Mes courants électriques The tour concluded with the release of a live album and DVD, Alizée En Concert.

== Background and composition ==
On 21 November 2000, Alizée released her debut album, "Gourmandises" (2000) in France, and released the album internationally on 13 March 2001. The album produced four singles, including the global top-five hits "Moi... Lolita," "L'Alizé," and "Gourmandises," each of which received notable commercial success. "Moi... Lolita" reached diamond status in France, while "L'Alizé" was certified platinum, and "Gourmandises" also achieved success, receiving significant chart positions across multiple countries.

The album was recorded at Studio Guillaume Tell, Caliphora Studio, and Studio Davout. It was digitally mastered using 24-bit technology.

== Release and promotion ==
For the promotion of the album, Alizée traveled around the world performing in different places. The first single from the album was "J'en ai marre!" in February 2003.

In early 2003, prior to the official release of Alizée's second studio album Mes courants électriques, the English version of her lead single, titled "I'm Fed Up!" (known as "Mon bain de mousse" in Japan), was leaked online approximately a month before the album's scheduled debut. Although the specific track wasn't named, a press release confirmed the leak and provided details about the album's title and release timeline.

=== Tour ===
During this period, Alizée was preparing for promotional activities in Japan Her promotional efforts in Japan included appearances on various television programs, interviews with local media, and serving as a spokeswoman for several Japanese brands. Alizée released the second single from the album, "J'ai pas vingt ans!" along with its English counterpart, "I'm Not Twenty" after she returned to France. To promote the single and the album, she performed at the official event show of the Tour de France 2003 in Paris.

== Commercial performance ==
The album debuted in the top 3 of the French Albums Chart and was certified double gold by SNEP, denoting over 400,000 copies sold in France. Internationally, the album was a success in Belgium, Switzerland, and Japan. In Japan, the album was re-released with bonus tracks. It charted on the Oricon International Charts.

== Track listing ==
All tracks are written by Mylène Farmer, and all music by Laurent Boutonnat.

No.	Title	Length
1.	"J'en ai marre!"	5:12
2.	"À contre-courant"	4:32
3.	"Toc de Mac"	4:29
4.	"Amélie m'a dit"	3:51
5.	"C'est trop tard"	4:43
6.	"Tempête"	4:42
7.	"J'ai pas vingt ans!"	4:23
8.	"Hey! Amigo!"	3:54
9.	"L'E-mail a des ailes"	4:10
10.	"Youpidou"	4:09
11.	"Cœur déjà pris"	4:16

International version
No.	Title	Length
1.	"I'm Fed Up!" (English version of "J'en ai marre!")	5:12
2.	"À contre-courant"	4:32
3.	"Toc de Mac"	4:31
4.	"Amélie" (English version of "Amélie m'a dit")	3:50
5.	"C'est trop tard"	4:43
6.	"Tempête"	4:42
7.	"I'm Not Twenty!" (English version of "J'ai pas vingt ans!")	4:23
8.	"Hey! Amigo!"	3:55
9.	"L'e-mail a des ailes"	4:10
10.	"Youpidoo" (English version of "Youpidou")	4:09
11.	"Cœur déjà pris"	4:22
12.	"J'en ai marre!"	5:12
13.	"Amélie m'a dit"	3:50
14.	"J'ai pas vingt ans!"	4:23
15.	"Youpidou"	4:09

Asian version
No.	Title	Length
1.	"Mon bain de mousse"	5:12
2.	"À contre-courant"	4:32
3.	"Toc de mac"	4:29
4.	"Amélie"	3:51
5.	"C'est trop tard"	4:43
6.	"Tempête"	4:42
7.	"I'm Not Twenty!"	4:23
8.	"Hey! Amigo!"	3:54
9.	"L'e-mail a des ailes"	4:10
10.	"Youpidoo"	4:09
11.	"Cœur déjà pris"	4:16
12.	"Mon bain de mousse" (English version of "J'en ai marre!")	5:12

== Personnel ==
- Alizée – vocals and backing vocals
- Laurent Boutonnat and Mylène Farmer – music, lyrics and costume
- Jean-Jacques Charles and Jean-Philippe Audin – orchestra director
- Ann Calvert – backing vocals (on "C'est trop tard")
- Bernard Paganotti – bass guitar
- Henry Neu – design
- Loïc Pontieux & Mathieu Rabaté – drums
- Paul van Parys – executive producer
- Philippe Bouley – guitar
- Jérôme Devoise and Vincent Chevalot – mixing

== Charts ==
Weekly chart performance for Mes courants électriques
Chart (2003)	Peak position
Belgian Albums Chart (Ultratop)	9
Finnish Albums Chart (Musiikkituottajat)	90
French Albums Chart (SNEP)	2
German Albums Chart (GfK)	26
Hong Kong Albums Chart	5
Italian Albums Chart (FIMI)	29
Israeli Albums Chart	4
Japanese Albums Chart (Oricon)	128
Polish Albums Chart (ZPAV)	32
Russian Albums Chart	10
South Korean Albums Chart (Circle)	3
Spanish Albums Chart (PROMUSICAE)	7
Swiss Albums Chart (Swiss HitParade)	27

== Certifications and sales ==
Certifications and sales for Mes courants électriques
Region	Certification	Certified units/sales
France (SNEP)	2× Platinum	400,000

== Release history ==
Release history and formats for Mes courants électriques
Region	Date	Label	Format
France	18 March 2003	Polydor	CD, Cassette, CD digipack limited
France	11 December 2020	Baskia	Vynil
France	2025	Baskia	Picture Disc (1000 ex)

web|url=http://www.chartsinfrance.net/Alizee/news-114838.html|title=Alizée : ses deux premiers albums sortiront en vinyle le 11 décembre|date=15 August 2020 |access-date=12 June 2021}}</ref> | Requiem Publishing | Vinyl |- ! scope="row"| United Kingdom | 18 March 2003 | rowspan="6"| Polydor | rowspan="7"| CD |- !scope="row"|Switzerland |rowspan="2"|15 April 2003 |- !scope="row"|Belgium |- !scope="row"|Europe | 5 June 2003 |- !scope="row"|Germany | 20 June 2003 |- !scope="row"|Asia | 10 July 2003 |- !scope="row"|Canada | 25 August 2003 | Universal Republic |}
