= Julia (French singer) =

French pop singer

- Birth name: Julia Fiquet
- Born: 24 September 2001 (age 23)
- Genres: Pop, chanson
- Occupation: Singer
- Labels: SMART

Julia Fiquet (born 24 September 2001), known mononymously as Julia, is a French singer.

At 13, she participated in the second French season of The Voice Kids (broadcast on TF1 in 2015) and thus came to the attention of Laurent Boutonnat. When later he and Mylène Farmer were looking for a new girl to record a song they wrote together called "S.E.X.T.O", they chose Julia. In 2020 they released the Julia album Passe comme tu sais written by Farmer/Boutonnat.

On 16 February 2022, she was announced as one of the contestants of Eurovision France, c'est vous qui decidez !, the French national selection for the Eurovision Song Contest 2022, with the song "Chut" ("Hush").

She had a small acting role in the 2024 film Queens of Drama (Les Reines de la drame).

== Discography ==
=== Albums ===
Title	Details	Charts			
Title	Details	FRA	BEL (Wa)	SWI	SWI (Rom)
Passe... comme tu sais	Released: 19 June 2020; Label: SMART	31	12	93	21

=== EPs ===
- S.E.X.T.O (Remixes)

=== Singles ===
- 2018: "S.E.X.T.O"
- 2019: "#MESUISTROMPÉE"
- 2019: "Passe... comme tu sais"
- 2020: "Et toi mon amour"
- 2022: "Chut"

=== Music videos ===
- 2018: "S.E.X.T.O"
- 2019: "#MESUISTROMPÉE"
- 2019: "Passe... comme tu sais"
- 2020: "Et toi mon amour"
