= Fifty-Sixty =

Single by Alizée

from the album Psychédélices
- Released: February 2008
- Length: 3:45
- Label: RCA
- Songwriters: Jérémy Châtelain, Jean Fauque
- Producer: Jérémy Châtelain

Alizée singles chronology
| "Mademoiselle Juliette" (2007) | "Fifty-Sixty" (2008) | "Les collines (never leave you)" (2008) |

Audio video
- "Fifty-Sixty (Remastered 2022)" on YouTube

"Fifty-Sixty" is a song by French singer Alizée. It was released as the second single from the album Psychédélices in February 2008.

== Chart performance ==
| Chart (2008) | Peak position |
|---|---|
| Belgium (Ultratip Bubbling Under Wallonia) | 23 |
