= Alizée =

French singer (born 1984)

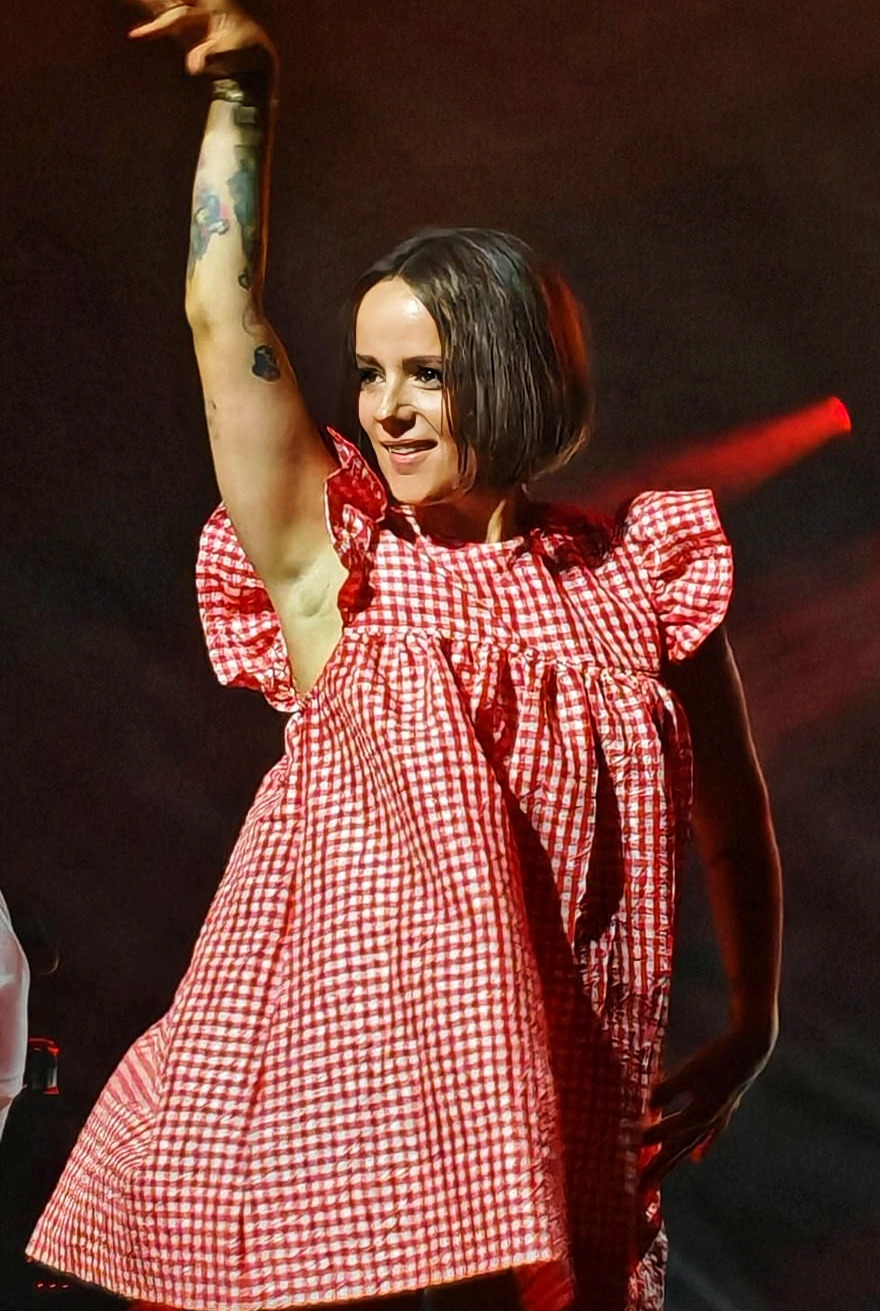
- Alizée at 25 ans déjà concert in 2025
- Born: Alizée Jacotey; 21 August 1984 (age 42); Ajaccio, Corsica, France
- Other name: Alizée Lyonnet
- Occupations: Singer, dancer
- Years active: 1999–present
- Spouses: Jérémy Chatelain (m. 2003; div. 2012) Grégoire Lyonnet (m. 2016)
- Children: 2
- Musical career
- Genres: French pop; dance-pop; electronic
- Instrument: Vocals
- Works: Alizée discography
- Labels: Universal; Polydor; RCA; Wisteria Song; Sony Music
- Website: alizee-officiel.com

Alizée Lyonnet (née Jacotey; born 21 August 1984), known mononymously as Alizée, is a French singer and dancer. She is one of the best-selling French female artists of the 21st century, and the musician with the most exports out of France. Her debut single "Moi... Lolita", is one of the hit songs of the 2000s in France, as well as in Europe and Asia. She has released 6 studio albums to date.

Born and raised in Ajaccio, Corsica, Alizée's first public appearance was her winning performance in the talent show Graines de star in 1999. While collaborating with Mylène Farmer and Laurent Boutonnat, she followed it with a series of albums that attained popularity by pushing the boundaries of lyrical content in mainstream popular music and imagery in her music videos, which became a fixture on NRJ, MTV, Virgin Radio, Europe 1, among others. Throughout her career, many of her songs have been in top 25 hit lists on the record charts, including "Moi... Lolita", "L'Alizé", "J'en ai marre!", "Gourmandises", "Mademoiselle Juliette", her cover version of "La Isla Bonita", "Parler Tout Bas", "Les collines (Never Leave You)" and "À cause de l'automne".

Alizée entered the music business in 2000. Her first album was Gourmandises, which received a Platinum certification within three months of release. It was a success both in France and abroad, earning Alizée the distinction of being the highest-selling female French singer in 2001. The album featured her most successful single, "Moi... Lolita", which reached number one in several countries in Europe and East Asia. It became a rare example of a foreign-language song to chart highly in the UK Singles Chart, peaking at number 9. It was followed by her second studio album, Mes courants électriques, which was released in 2003, focusing on the East Asian market. Alizée returned home for touring at En concert Tour, performing in 43 concerts throughout France, Belgium and Switzerland in 2003 and 2004.

After a three years hiatus, Alizée released her third studio album, Psychédélices, in 2007, which achieved some success in Latin America and Eastern Europe, performing in these regions on the Psychédélices Tour in 2008. For her fourth album, 2010's Une enfant du siècle, she collaborated with the independent Parisian scene, including Para One and Adán Jodorowsky, and performed in concerts through France and Eastern Europe. In the next years, she recorded several collaborations, including Alain Chamfort's "Elle & lui" and Olly Murs's "Dear Darlin'". She released her fifth studio album 5 in 2013, passing through a divorce process and musical maturity, earning praise for her artistic evolution. She also participated in and won the fourth season of the TV dance contest Danse avec les stars. Her sixth album, Blonde, was released in 2014, collaborating with Pascal Obispo and Zazie and featuring more mainstream pop sounds. It received mixed reviews and was not successful in sales.

== Biography ==
=== 1984–2000: Early life and career beginnings ===
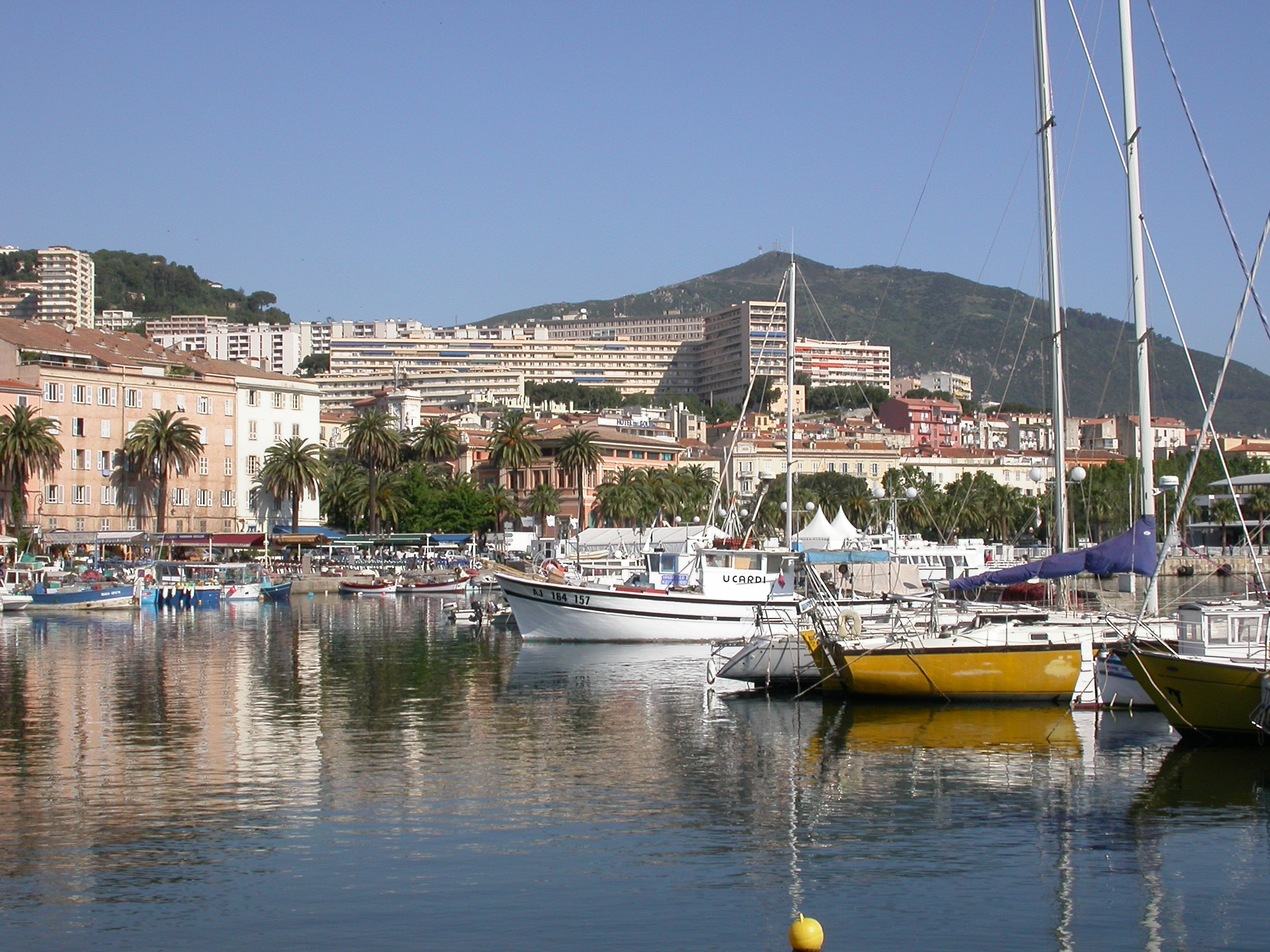
Alizée grew up in Ajaccio, Corsica.

Known to all her friends by her nickname "Lili", Alizée began dancing early in life, and by the age of four was already proficient. During 1988–2000, she studied in what was then called Ecole de danse Monique Mufraggi, a famous dance and theatre school in Ajaccio. In 1995, aged 11, she won a colouring competition with about 7,000 entrants organised by the French airline Air Outre Mer. Her design was used to paint the exterior of one of their airliners, subsequently named after her, for which Alizée won a vacation trip with her family to the Maldives.

In 1999, she appeared on the TV talent show Graines de star, broadcast on Métropole 6. She initially intended to sign up for the programme's dance contest, but that category was reserved for groups only. Alizée therefore joined the singing category instead, performing the song "Waiting for Tonight" by Jennifer Lopez and "Ma Prière" (a single released by Axelle Red in 1997). She went on to win the Meilleure Graine award for most promising young singing star of tomorrow.

=== 2000–2002: Gourmandises, Moi... Lolita, L'Alizé, and international success ===
Alizée's winning performance was seen by veteran songwriters Mylène Farmer and Laurent Boutonnat, who were looking for a young, fresh voice to partake in their new project. They approached Alizée, and she was selected after studio auditions. The duo arranged her debut with a meticulously orchestrated launch, controlling her image and public appearances. In 2000, they produced her maiden album, Gourmandises ("Delicacies"), which was a great success in France, Belgium, Germany, Mexico, and the United Kingdom. The first single, "Moi... Lolita", resurrected the rich French musical tradition pioneered by Serge Gainsbourg in 1964 with the song "Pauvre Lola", inspired by the celebrated novel Lolita, creating the image which defined Alizée in the early years of her career. She won an M6 award in 2000 and returned with a follow-up album, Mes courants électriques, in 2003. This second album was also quite successful, though less so than her first album. A video album shot during her European concert tour soon followed.

"Moi... Lolita" became her most successful to date. It enjoyed success throughout most of Europe and parts of East Asia, reaching number one in several countries. The associated music video portrayed Alizée as an impoverished rustic teen visiting a dance club in the city with her little sister, pursued by a young man who had lent them the bus fare to get there, but whose romantic interest in her she never returned. The song was later used in the UK trailer of the 2006 film, A Good Year, and was a part of the film's soundtrack. The single was from her debut album, Gourmandises, released in 2000. The album, written by Farmer and composed by Boutonnat, sold over 788,000 copies in France – it reached Platinum status in just three months. In 2001, the album was launched internationally and Alizée became the highest-selling female French singer ever. The album went on to sell over two million copies worldwide. Farmer and Boutonnat kept a tight rein how the album was marketed and controlled the image in which Alizée was portrayed. In the meantime, Alizée gave very few interviews, and even when she did, they did not stretch beyond 20 minutes per journalist. Neither did she agree to any photoshoots.

Her second single "L'Alizé" (2000), also from the same album, followed soon. It also hit number one in France, and gained some international success. The video of the "sexily alliterative" song (compare its title to "Lola", a variant on "Lolita") shows a miraculously acrobatic (even airborne) Alizée frolicking amidst popping bubbles in front of a pink backdrop, erotically singing about her cautious search for a true love. The video was shot in a studio in Brussels, which had a 25-metre-by-10-metre painted canvas to serve as the background, with real bubbles. This single was followed up with another single from the same album – the title song "Gourmandises". The video, which shows a group of teenage boys and girls on a picnic, was shot in a day. The last single from the album was "Parler tout bas", about coming of age, and was illustrated with a surreal music video. In France, "Parler tout bas" was the third single, then followed by the release of Gourmandises.

=== 2003–2004: Mes courants électriques and En Concert ===
Alizée's original logo, used between 2000 and 2004

In 2003, Alizée returned with her second album Mes courants électriques ("My Electric Currents"). With the release of this album, she changed her image from a "Lolita" to that of a more toned-down teenager. This album was also written by Farmer and Boutonnat and sold 400,000 copies in France.

The first single from this album, "J'en ai marre!" (also known as "Mon bain de mousse" in Japan), was released in 2003. The music video for this shows Alizée in a glass cage singing while having water splashed on her. The plexiglass cage, three-by-three meters in dimension, was constructed in a Parisian studio, and the shooting of the video took two days. The other singles from this album were "J'ai pas vingt ans" and "À contre-courant". The video for "J'ai pas vingt ans" ("I'm Not Twenty") resembles the ambience of a concert with Alizée dancing in the midst of several other dancers. "À contre-courant", the last single from the album, was shot in an abandoned coal factory.

The albums features English versions of four tracks. The translations are artistic translations rather than literal, attempting to capture the rough feeling and concepts rather than the specific words and expressions. In some cases they are "dumbed down", lacking the clever French wordplays of the originals.

Following the release of Mes courants électriques, Alizée went on a countrywide tour of France, along with a performance each in Belgium and Switzerland, during the second half of 2003. The tour started off with a performance on 26 August 2003 in Paris. It concluded with her performance on the prestigious l'Olympia hall in Paris and eve of 17 January 2004 at the Le Zénith concert hall in the same city and had covered major cities including Lyon, Rouen, Lille, Grenoble, and Dijon. A live CD and DVD, Alizée en concert, composed of selected performances from her tour, was launched a year later in the autumn of 2004. The audio CD contained tracks, taken from her two studio albums. The DVD featured video footage of the same performances as on the CD, along with bonus footage of her rehearsals.

=== 2005–2007: The hiatus and release in Mexico ===
In 2005, after the success of her first tour and first live album release, Alizée first disappeared from the limelight, then reappeared in the media as it was revealed she was pregnant. She gave birth to a girl, Annily, on 28 April 2005 (the child she had with Jérémy Chatelain), and put her career on hold. However, the tabloids devoted several articles, for the name Alizée appeared with others, including the false listings of the Clearstream affair. After several rumours of an imminent return, especially in collaboration with the band Indochine, Alizée left Universal Records to sign with RCA (Sony BMG) in August 2007, also revealing that the En concert album and tour were her last collaboration with her mentors.

Meanwhile, a compilation of the live album was re-released in early 2007 in Mexico by Universal Music as a CD+DVD release, following the featuring of the songs on local radio stations. With the re-release and renewed interest, the songs climbed up the music charts in the country. The album became a hit, peaking at number four in the International Chart on 28 May 2007, and number eight on the main albums chart. En concert has a Gold certification for shipments over 50,000 copies only in Mexico.

=== 2007–2009: Psychédélices, Tout Alizée and Latin American success ===
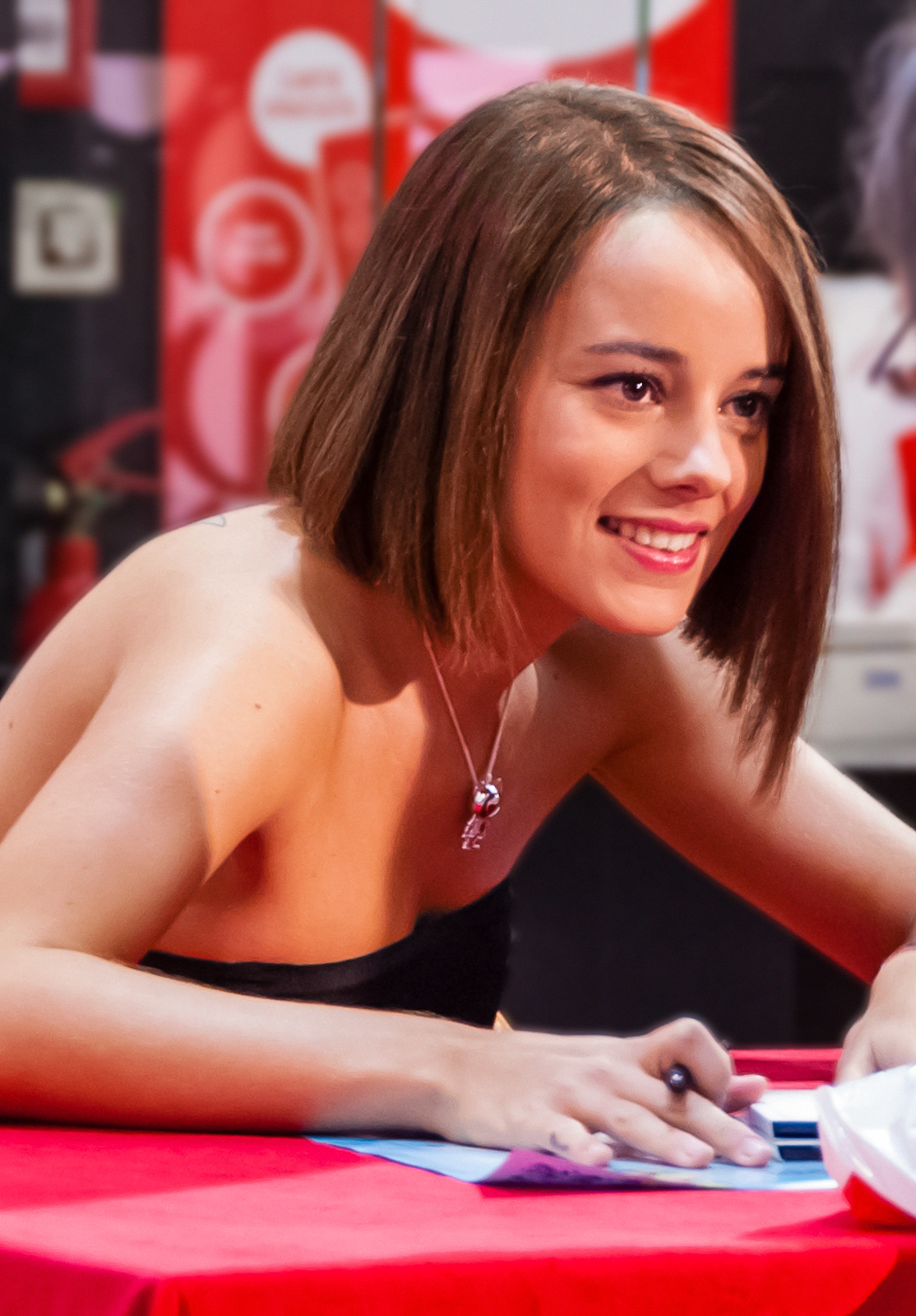
Alizée in an autograph session in 2007 in Paris

After a three-year hiatus, a time spent out of the media spotlight, Alizée returned in December 2007 with a new album, Psychédélices, the first one to be made without the creative supervision of her former mentor Mylène Farmer. The album, which features 11 tracks, was made available for digital downloads 26 November 2007, with a full release on 3 December 2007 on the RCA label. It includes collaborations with Bertrand Burgalat, Daniel Darc, Oxmo Puccino, Jérémy Chatelain, Michel-Yves Kochmann, and Jean Fauque. The first single from the album was "Mademoiselle Juliette", officially released on 30 September 2007. It was accidentally released early on the Virgin Megastore website on 23 September 2007, but was taken down later citing an error on the part of Virgin Music France. The single was later made available in online music stores as well as on radio stations, and went on to capture the No. 13 spot on the legal music downloads charts. To promote the single, Alizée appeared on the French radio station NRJ on 27 September 2007. The video for the single was released for broadcast on 19 November 2007, though it was made available on MSN France on 16 November 2007. It was released on physical media, both CD and vinyl, on 21 January 2008.

Another track from the album, "Fifty-Sixty", was leaked two months before the album was released. Though the song was not mentioned by name, the leak was confirmed in a press release which revealed the title and release schedule of the album. "Fifty-Sixty" later launched as the second single from the album in February 2008. The lyric of "Fifty-Sixty" tells, in personal and metaphorical manner, of a young model under the guidance of Andy Warhol, possibly inspired by real-life story of Edie Sedgwick. The song ends with a reiteration of how she foolishly believed Warhol thought her the most beautiful model of all. Three music videos were released for the single, one for the album version of the song and the other two for two remixes. An Alizée website, Psychedeclips.com, was dedicated to the video series, the first of which was released on 5 May 2008.

Coinciding with the new album, a new official website was created, which, despite being announced on 11 September 2007, was kept under wraps until 28 November 2007. The album was also promoted via an official artist profile at MySpace. Advertising and marketing campaigns for the album began 22 November 2007 with ad campaigns on NRJ Radio, TF1-TV, and the web.

In March 2008, Alizée visited Mexico for the first time in a short promotional tour. On 5 March, she was supposed to hold the second-ever public autograph session of her career but it was cancelled due to problems with the store's security. She held an improvised press conference to apologise to all her Mexican fans and to explain that it was not her fault. Sony BMG Mexico also released a statement saying it was not Alizée's fault, that it was the store who had problems with the security, and that they did not expect so many people in attendance; fences had been broken and children were in danger. Alizée also promised to make amends by having another autograph session when she returned to the country on the following tour. She also stated that her tour would start on 18 May in Moscow, followed by concerts in Mexico and then France. She also commented that piracy in music has two sides, "one good" and "one bad", saying that sometimes it is good because her music reaches places that she never thought to reach. After the success of Alizée's tour in Mexico, and in an attempt to mitigate the damage caused during her first promotional visit, Alizée announced an autograph session with fans on 26 June 2008 in Mexico City. Over 300 CDs were signed and the record label executives of Sony BMG Mexico presented a Gold certification for shipments over 50,000 copies of Psychédélices – Mexican Tour Edition. A new cover singing in Mexico was Madonna's cover "La Isla Bonita"; it went on to become Alizée's first top-ten on the airplay chart.

Following the success of Alizée en concert and Psychédélices in Mexico, Alizée's former music label, Universal Music, released a compilation album titled Tout Alizée. The compilation, which is a Mexico-only release, consists of 15 tracks (with 4 remixes) from her first two studio albums. It is augmented with a bonus DVD featuring some of her music videos. The compilation reached No. 22 on the Mexican Top 100 Albums Chart and No. 3 on the Mexican International Top 20 Albums Chart.

=== 2010–2011: Une enfant du siècle, new style and transition ===
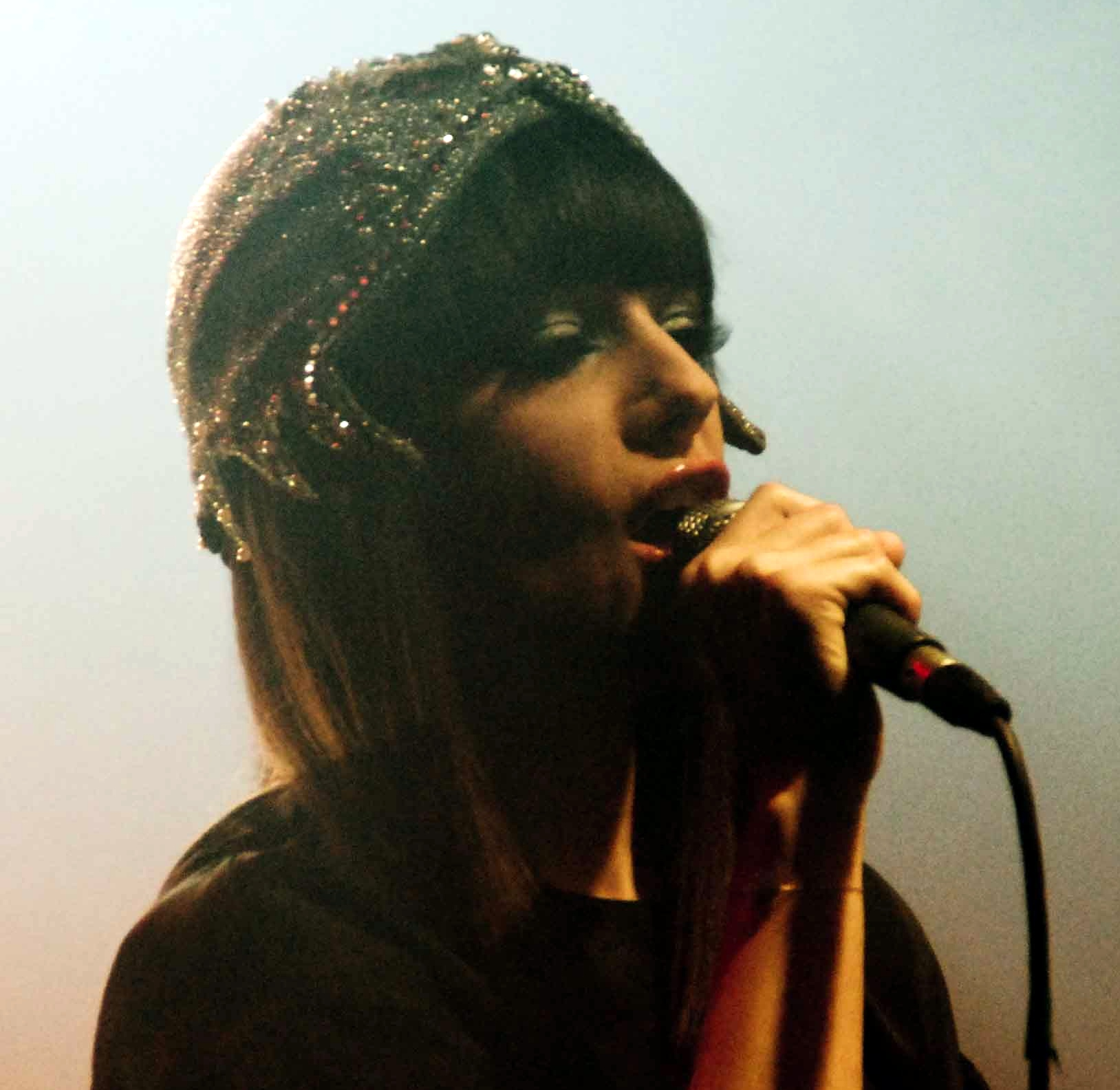
Alizée in 2010 singing at the Point Ephémère lounge in Paris

At the beginning of 2009, Alizée had to cancel a concert in France. She announced then that she was already working on her future album, which would sound very different from all of her previous recordings. The album was called Une enfant du siècle and was released in France on 29 March 2010. A teaser could be seen on the Internet, called "Une enfant du siècle" ("A child of the century").

According to British website Popjustice, the first single is partially in English and it is called "Limelight". On 15 February 2010, they uploaded the full version of the song and a clip from the music video. The special collector edition of the album was made available for pre-orders on 4 February 2010. However, it was later confirmed by Popjustice itself that "Limelight" was a teaser single, and the official single from Alizée's fourth album was "Les collines (Never Leave You)".

The full album leaked on to the Internet on 19 March 2010. The album was released in France on 29 March 2010. It received mixed-to-positive reviews by critics, praising her radical change from her teen pop roots, but also criticising her perceived lack of interest in the project, and the uncatchy nature of the melodies. On that day, Alizée signed autographs at the Virgin Megastore in Paris. The album is inspired by and depicts the life of Edie Sedgwick.

Alizée performed in Israel in a tribute to Serge Gainsbourg on 28 July 2010 in Tel Aviv at the National Opéra. She covered a song called "Dis-lui toi que je t'aime", originally sung by Vanessa Paradis, accompanied by the national orchestra. She also performed a song with Israeli singer Harel Skaat. The music video of the first single "Les collines (Never Leave You)" was released on 19 March 2010 on Alizée's official YouTube channel.

=== 2012–2013: 5 and Danse avec les stars ===
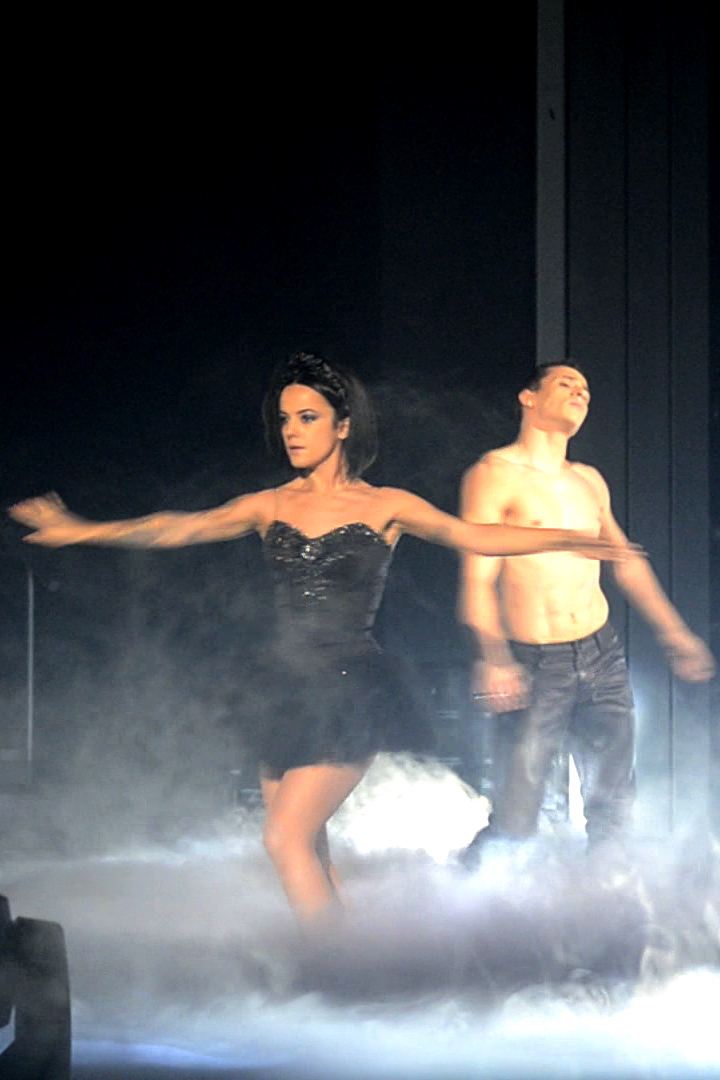
Alizée and Grégoire Lyonnet performing the "Black Swan" dance during the Danse avec les stars tour in Lyon, April 2014

Between 1 and 6 February 2012, Alizée appeared in several shows on French television. She announced that a new album was scheduled for spring 2012, marking a return to roots music which would be released on the Sony Music label; Sony subsequently announced that the album was to be delayed until the autumn of 2012. In April 2012, she was featured on the single "Clara veut la Lune" by Alain Chamfort. On 27 June 2012, Alizée announced on live chat that the first single from the new album, "À cause de l'automne", was to be released 28 June 2012. The first music video was shot on 15 July 2012, but was only released on the VidZone platform for PlayStation 3. Alizée also revealed that for the new album she was working with Jean-Jacques Goldman, BB Brunes, and Thomas Boulard (singer and guitarist of the rock band Luke). On 12 July, a limited collector's edition of the fifth album became available for pre-order. The original release date was changed from 1 October 2012 to March 2013. A "Collector's Box was released for " pre-order page states 23 January 2013 as for the release.

In December 2012, the official video of "À cause de l'automne" was published on Alizée's VEVO channel, initially available only in France and made available for the rest of the world in February 2013. The first performance of her latest single was on RFM radio on 21 December 2012, where she sang the song in a live broadcast.

Alizée announced Alexandre Azaria as the "artistic director" for her newest album, 5. In January, the name and the cover of the album were shown on a Star Academy, where Alizée made an appearance.

She promoted the album with performances during Soccer Beach Show of Monaco, Alain Chamfort's En concert at Le Grand Rex, and during her participation in Les Enfoirés 2013 concert at the Paris-Bercy hall and Le Tour de France 2013 opening ceremony performance in Porto-Vecchio, where she sang the second single from the album, "Je veux bien". She also promoted the album in the January/February 2013 issue of the French edition of the Inked magazine.

In August, Alizée was confirmed to be participating in the upcoming fourth season of the popular reality show Danse avec les stars (the French version of Strictly Come Dancing) for the promotion of 5. About a month later, she announced that she was again in the studio for a "surprise" and in September revealed her collaboration with the singer Olly Murs in a new, French version of his single "Dear Darlin'". Alizée won the first place in Danse avec les stars in November 2013.

As announced by MetroNews, Alizée would perform during NRJ Music Awards on 14 December 2013. She performed "Scream & Shout" with will.i.am, singing the lines originally sung by Britney Spears, including the line "Alizée, bitch"; along with "Le tourbillon" with Tal.

=== 2014–2018: Blonde and hiatus ===
Development of the sixth album started in fall 2013 when it became clear that Alizée would be very successful on Danse avec les stars. Recording of the album began in December 2013, and featured contributions from Pascal Obispo, Lionel Florence and Zazie. The first single, "Blonde", composed by Obispo, was released in March 2014, with the album of the same name released on June 23. Another song, "Alcaline", was released on 16 June as a single. The album received mixed reviews and was not as successful as expected, which led to an upcoming tour being cancelled.

In September 2014, Alizée contributed to the single "Kiss & Love" for the charity event Sidaction, and announced her participation in the 2014–2015 Danse avec les stars Tour. She also took part in We Love Disney 2 with a cover of the song "Tendre Rêve", originally from the soundtrack of Cendrillon, the French version of Cinderella. In December, Alizée announced that she would be dubbing a character in the animation film Clochette et la créature légendaire, the French version of Tinker Bell and the Legend of the NeverBeast.

After appearing on Danse avec les stars, Alizée began actively working as a dancer in various shows, eventually opening a dance academy in her hometown Ajaccio with her husband Grégoire Lyonnet, the AG Studio (Studio de danse Lyonnet). In October 2017, she announced that she wanted to put her music career on hold to focus on her "first passion", dancing.

=== 2024–present ===
Alizée announced her return to the stage to perform her greatest hits during the summer of 2024: Madrid (June 29), as part of the Love the Twentie festival, and Nice (June 28), La Seyne-sur-Mer (August 2) and Toulouse (August 15) as part of the La Kermesse festival.

In 2025, Alizée announced that on September 7, she would give a concert titled 25 ANS DÉJÀ at L’Olympia to celebrate the 25th anniversary of her career, and as tickets went on sale, they sold out within minutes. Seeing this, Alizée and her team announced a bonus date for the following day.

Following the great success of the two nights, she soon announced that in 2026, she would take the 25th anniversary concert on tour in France and Belgium, with stops including Ajaccio (the first venue), Lyon, Lille, Marseille., and even the Zénith Paris arena, as announced later.

== Personal life ==
Though described as a very shy and reserved person, Alizée likes performing in front of audiences. Although she is most famous as a singer, she prefers dancing, and is quite proficient in classical dance, jazz, Italian style ballet, tap and flamenco.

Alizée married fellow French singer Jérémy Chatelain in Las Vegas on 6 November 2003. They have a daughter named Annily (born 2005). The public found out about their marriage in February 2004 when Voici magazine released a copy of their marriage certificate in an article. She was quiet about her private and family life and kept her child out of the press to the best of her ability, but since 2011 has been much more open about her private life. Jérémy and Alizée divorced in early 2012.

During Danse avec les stars in fall 2013, Alizée met and started to date Grégoire Lyonnet, whom she married on 18 June 2016. In an Instagram post dated 24 May 2019, Alizée announced that she was pregnant with her second child. She gave birth to a daughter on 24 November 2019.

== Artistry ==
=== Music and voice ===
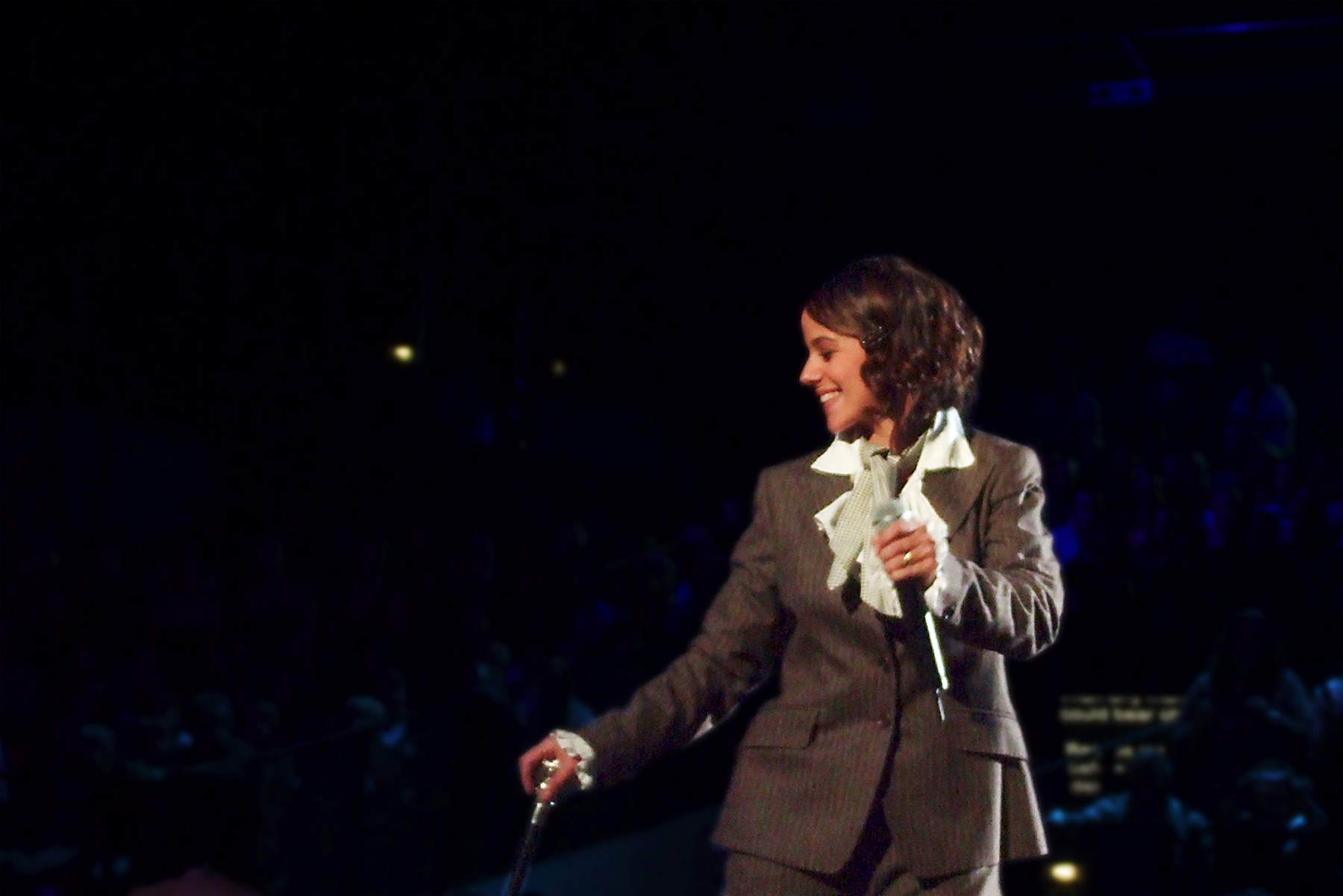
Alizée at Les Enfoires in 2008

Alizée has a mezzo-soprano vocal type and range. She started her musical career with songs she described as "soulful pop music". In 2000, she erupted in the musical world, becoming an international sensation because she was the most successful female French singer in a long while. Alizée is known for blending electronic sounds with pop, such as psychedelic pop, and more recently mainstream Europop. At the time of her debut, NRJ Radio said about her, "The Queen of Europop is a French Lolita". In her debut album, Alizée used Europop with mellow sounds, world music and the classic French chanson. The second album was primarily house sounds, instrumentals and electronic sounds mixed with the sounds from her last album. The third album marked a change, replacing her earlier styles with psychedelic sounds and a very rhythmic world music. The single "Fifty-Sixty" is dedicated to the memory of model Edie Sedgwick. For her fourth album, she had another radical change in musical style with a new genre for her career: Mainstream, with strong rhythms compared to her previous three albums. Alizée made clear that the renewal is a big part of her contribution to music.

=== Public image ===
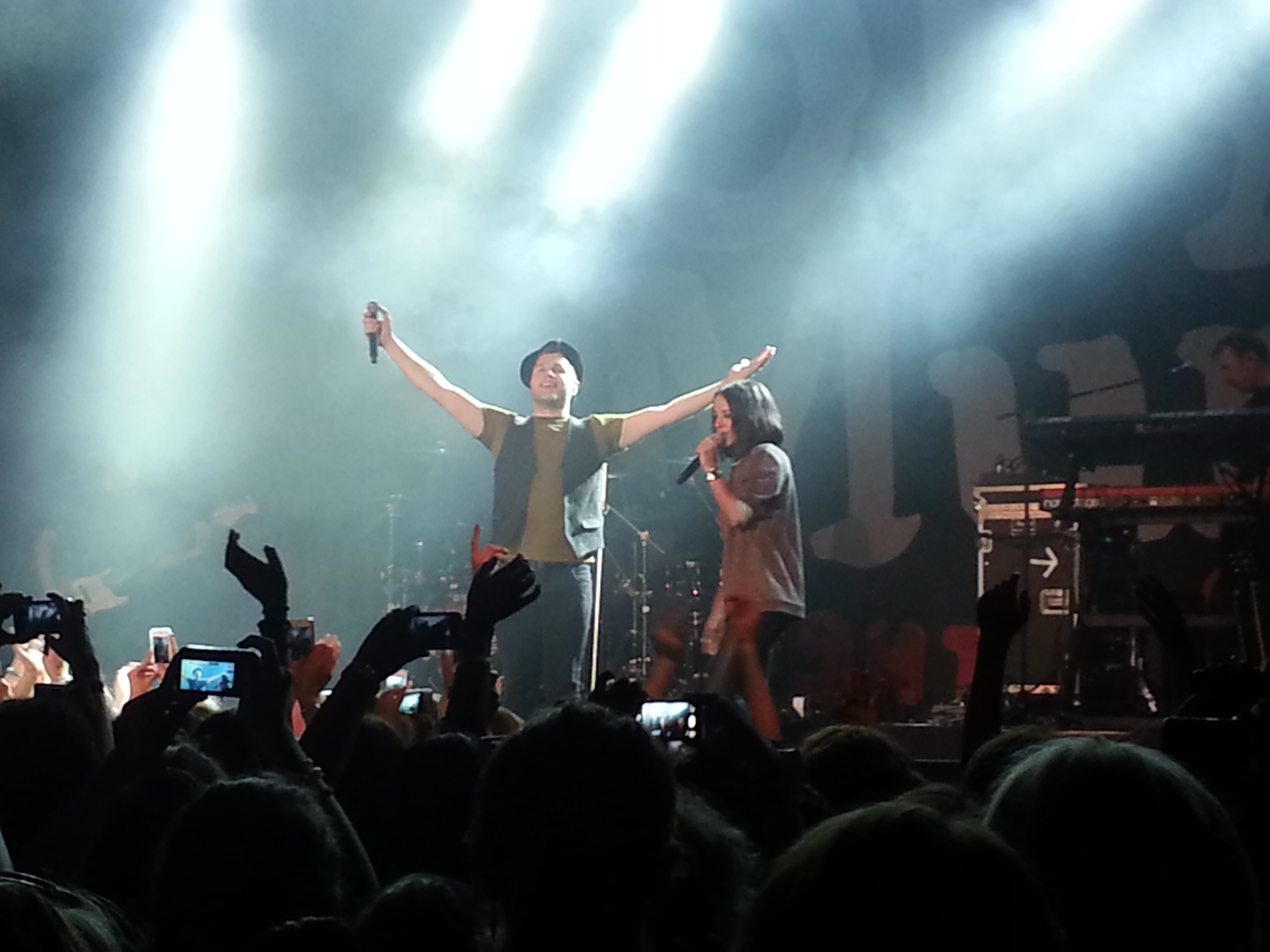
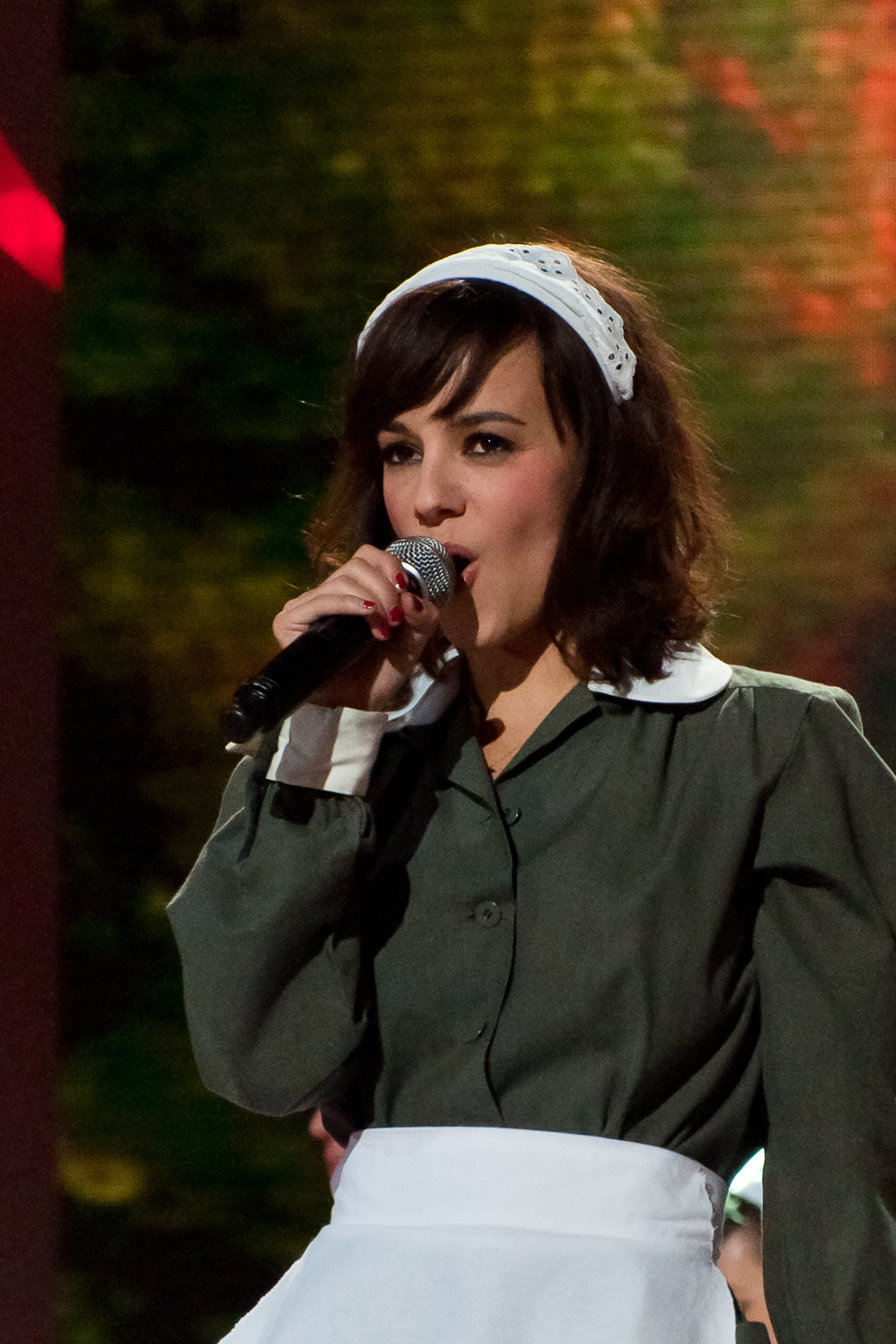
Alizée in concert with Olly Murs in 2013 (left) and performing at Les Enfoires in Montpellier (right)

Even though early albums portrayed her in a sexy, Lolita-like manner, Alizée was modest, demure and family-oriented in public during her teenage years. For her second album, she mostly kept a similar style but with more electronic influences. Her hairstyle was usually a simple bob and her make-up was designed to emphasise and enhance her natural beauty.

For her third album, Alizée changed her style radically in terms of both music and image, with a more mature performance and more elaborate make-up, clothing and hairstyle. For the promotion of this album, she posed for a French magazine, Technikart, in the "Like a Virgin" style of her idol Madonna. After a two-year hiatus, she returned with a fourth album whose style was more "psychedelic" and which saw her seeking a new and wider audience.

Alizée is very fond of tattoos, of which she has many. The best known is the large Disney-style Tinkerbell on her back, which reflects the fact that she had regarded the character as a mascot since childhood, amassing a large collection of its statuettes. It was often shown during her promotion of the Psychédélices album, presumably because Psyche is something of an ancient forerunner of Tinkerbell. The anime superheroine Sailor Moon, who shares a few commonalities with Tinkerbell, is prominent on Alizée's right arm.

Over the years, Alizée has been declared a fashionista, appearing in various fashion magazines, beauty and culture. She has attended major fashion weeks in the world and smaller events. In the 2010 "Sexiest Women in the World" polls run by the French edition of FHM magazine, readers voted Alizée as the second-sexiest woman out of 100. Since 2012, Alizée has appeared in many magazines and publications including the January/February 2013 issue of the French edition of Inked magazine which featured a photo shoot, including on the cover, of her as a manacled and bloodied punk princess by the French photographer Julien Lachaussée, and many more. In 2013, she was one of the guests of honour for her friend John Galliano at Paris Fashion Week 2013.

Alizée was ranked fourth in a list of the most influential female artists in France by the amount of followers in social media in March 2014.

== Legacy ==
Alizée became an international pop culture icon immediately after launching her recording career. Media said she was one of the most controversial female vocalists of the 21st century, that she had broken into the music world at 17 years old with a worldwide success, that she spearheaded the rise of post-millennial Europop and became its "queen", and that "Alizée early on cultivated a mixture of a sweet Lolita innocence and experience that broke the bank".

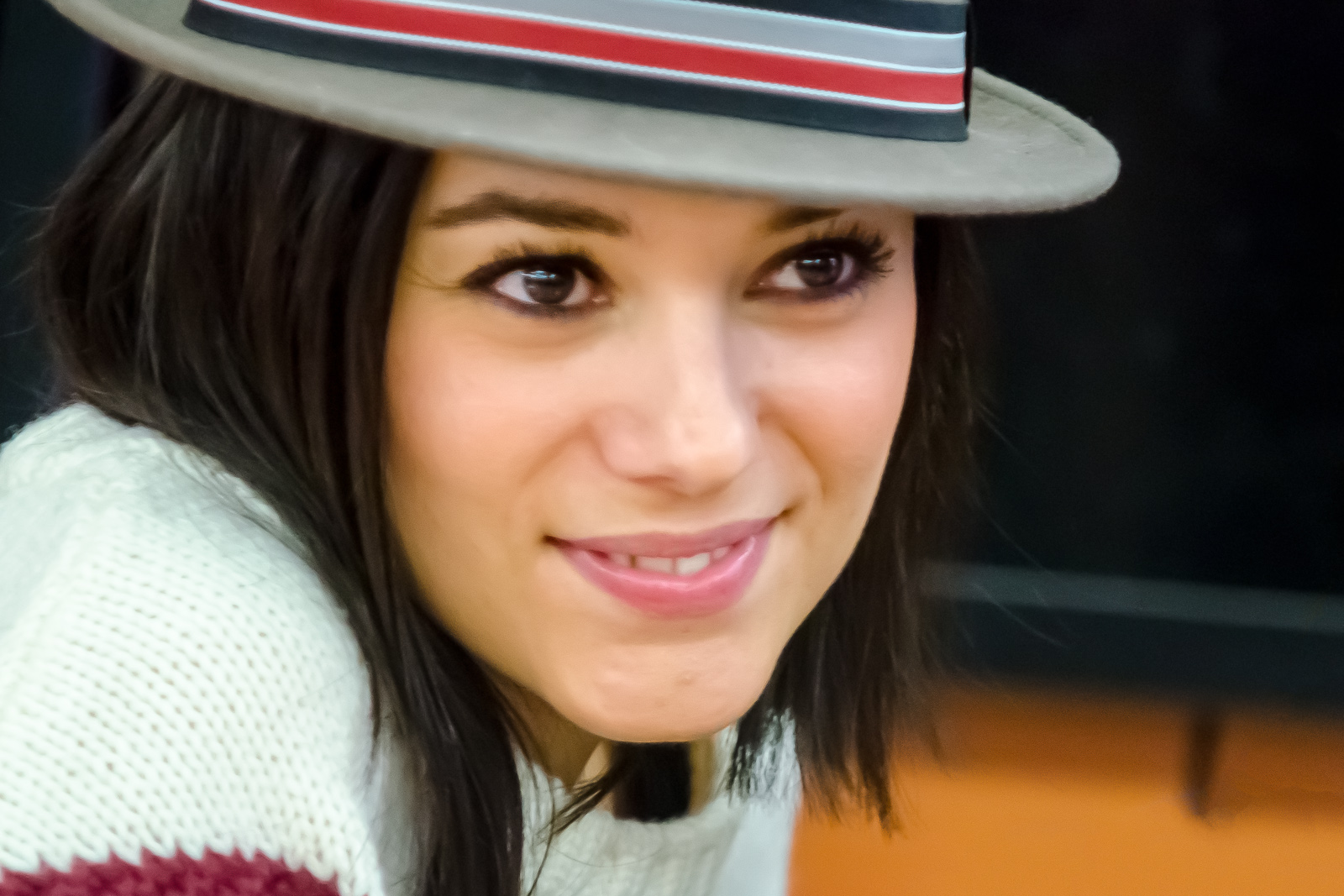
Alizée at an autograph-signing event in Poitiers in 2013

Her debut album Gourmandises sold 700,000 in only three months in France, and 1,000,000 in Europe in 2001. In early 2001, she won the NRJ Music Awards for Francophone Revelation after she won an M6 Award in late 2000. She was also nominated for the same category in the Victoires de la Musique.

"Moi... Lolita" is one of the best-selling singles in France and Alizée's most famous single to date. She also has two singles in the French Top 100 singles of the 2000s. In 2002, Le Figaro newspaper announced as Alizée's music was the top earning French music of the year thanks in part to Farmer and Boutonnat's collaboration, which earned 10.4 million €. The "Mademoiselle Juliette" video released on 19 November 2007 is listed at 138 in the countdown of 150 most important videos of the last 15 years of the MTV Latin America channel.

"Moi... Lolita" achieved international commercial success, bringing the singer widespread popularity in France. Media outlets referred to her as "the most famous Lolita", and she remains one of the highest-exporting French singers.

Alizée's choreography for performances of "J'en ai marre!" served as the inspiration for the female night elf dance animation in Blizzard Entertainment's massively multiplayer online role-playing game World of Warcraft.

=== Critical response ===
Despite the marketing hype and commercial success, there were mixed critical responses to the launch of "Moi... Lolita", Alizée's first single. The critics felt that the similarity in style to that of Mylène Farmer was too striking. Some felt that her Lolita image overshadowed her singing prowess, describing her as "desperately trying to be sexy", and many were ready to write her off. Some of her songs have been described as "sweeping, atmospheric ballads" whose "melodies are so sparkling and beguiling", and from which Alizée manages to "squeeze more emotion than the usual pop package". Alizée's three albums include a wide range of songs, from catchy pop tunes to soulful ballads. Radio France Internationale featured Gourmandises as their CD of the week, stating:

The ten songs on Alizée's debut album, Gourmandises (Goodies), have all been expertly manufactured by the Farmer hit-machine. Sweet syrupy pop ditties are wrapped in silky synths, violins and catchy techno beats and judging by the success of Alizée's sexily alliterative second single, L'Alizé, the Farmer team have hit upon a winning formula.

...Gourmandises the French word for sweets (or candies) is the appropriate title of French pop princess Alizée's debut album. Like an aniseed ball, the mix of pop tunes and ballads are pleasant and consistent throughout, but at the same time never too adventurous. The French lyrics may spoil the album for some but the catchy tunes and lyrics (even though they may mean little to the average English speaker) highlight the universal language of pop...

...Sixteen-year-old Alizée is France's answer to the teen queen phenomenon. With one notable exception: Alizée has real talent...

In recent years, critics have commented upon the maturing of Alizée's image and style, and her being a growing artist full of "classy" sounds, and having a strong voice. They have observed how "Lolita", who had begun her career at the beginning of the new century, has transformed into a mature woman and accomplished singer throughout the years.

== Charity work ==
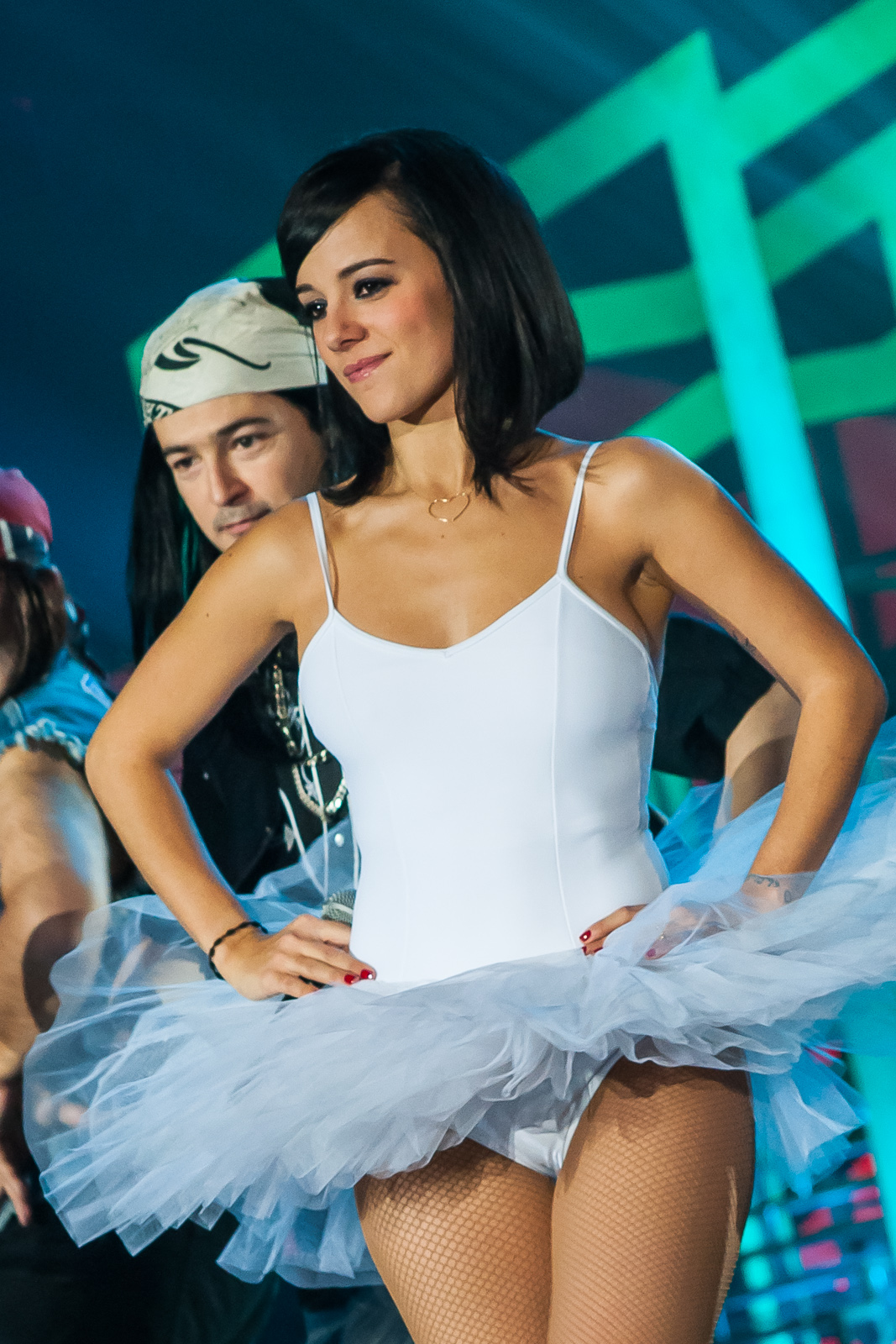
Alizée with Les Enfoirés

Alizée was involved in charity work through Les Enfoirés, a group of French celebrities who organise fundraising concerts every year. The proceeds from these concerts go to Les Restaurants du Coeur. The organisation, set up by French comedian Coluche, helps feed the poor. Alizée participated in these concerts in 2001, 2002 and from 2008 to 2013.

In 2011, the singer participated in the Collectif Paris-Africa to fight against famine in Africa (similar to USA for Africa). She recorded the song "Des ricochets" along with 60 artists for the compilation album Collectif Paris-Africa pour l'UNICEF.

== Works ==
=== Discography ===
Studio albums

- Gourmandises (2000)
- Mes courants électriques (2003)
- Psychédélices (2007)
- Une enfant du siècle (2010)
- 5 (2013)
- Blonde (2014)

=== Dance ===
==== Dance shows ====
- Danse avec les stars – season 4 (2013)
- La danse fait son show (2014)
- Danse avec les stars – season 7 / week 8 (2016)

==== Dance tours ====
- Danse avec les stars Tour (2013–2014)
- Danse avec les stars Tour (2014–2015)
- Danse avec les stars Tour (2016)
- Danse avec les stars Tour (2017)

== See also ==
- Société des auteurs, compositeurs et éditeurs de musique
- Syndicat National de l'Édition Phonographique
- French Top 100 singles of the 2000s
- List of best-selling singles in France
- List of Corsican people

== Bibliography ==
- Pierre-Alexandre Bescos (2008). Alizée. Bibliothèque nationale de France. ISBN 978-2-915957-49-5.
