= En concert Tour =

Concert tour by Alizée

Alizée en concert
- Tour by Alizée
- Associated album: Gourmandises; Mes courants électriques
- Start date: 26 August 2003
- End date: 17 January 2004
- No. of shows: 42 in Europe

Alizée concert chronology
- En concert (2003–2004); Psychédélices Tour (2008)

The En concert tour was the first concert tour of the French recording artist Alizée. It started at the famous Olympia music hall in Paris. The tour was generally well received although not all of the concerts sold out. The original plan had 43 dates but two of them got cancelled. Near the end of the tour, one extra concert date was added to bring the tour back to Paris, this time at the huge Zénith de Paris music hall. She also had one concert in both Switzerland and Belgium. With the two cancelled and one added date, the total number of concerts held was 42.

== Background and development ==
Following the release of Mes courants electriques, Alizée went on a countrywide tour of France, along with a performance each in Belgium and Switzerland, during the second half of 2003. The tour started off with a performance on 26 August 2003 in Paris. It concluded with her performance at the prestigious Olympia hall in Paris and eve of 17 January 2004 at the Le Zénith concert hall in the same city. She also covered major cities including Lyon, Rouen, Lille, Grenoble and Dijon. A live CD and DVD, titled Alizée en concert, composed of selected performances from her tour, was launched a year later in the fall of 2004. The audio CD contained tracks, taken from her two studio albums. The DVD featured video footage of the same performances as on the CD, along with bonus footage of her rehearsals.

== Set list ==
1. "Intralizée"
2. "L'Alizé"
3. "Hey! Amigo!"
4. "Toc de mac"
5. "J'en ai marre!"
6. "Lui ou toi"
7. "Gourmandises"
8. "L'e-mail a des ailes"
9. "Mon maquis"
10. "J.B.G."
11. "Moi... Lolita"
12. "Amélie m'a dit"
13. "Parler tout bas"
14. "C'est trop tard"
15. "Youpidou"
16. "Tempête"
17. "À contre-courant"
18. "J'ai pas vingt ans"
19. "Générique de fin"

== Concerts ==
Date	City	Country	Venue	Extra info
Europe
26 August 2003	Paris	France	Olympia	Alizée's first full concert.
27 August 2003	Paris	France	Olympia	
30 August 2003	Paris	France	Olympia	
31 August 2003	Paris	France	Olympia	
2 September 2003	Paris	France	Olympia	
3 September 2003	Paris	France	Olympia	
4 September 2003	Paris	France	Olympia	
10 October 2003	Rouen	France	Zénith de Rouen	
11 October 2003	Lille	France	Zénith de Lille	
12 October 2003	Brussels	Belgium	Forest National	
14 October 2003	Amnéville	France	Galaxie	
17 October 2003	Limoges	France	Palais des Sports de Beaublanc	
18 October 2003	Pau	France	Zénith de Pau	
19 October 2003	Toulouse	France	Zénith de Toulouse	
21 October 2003	Marseille	France	Le Dôme de Marseille	
24 October 2003	Toulon	France	Zénith Oméga de Toulon	
25 October 2003	Nice	France	Palais Nikaïa	
26 October 2003	Montpellier	France	Zénith Sud	
11 November 2003	Geneva	Switzerland	Aréna	Sang partly "I'm Not Twenty".
14 November 2003	Caen	France	Zénith de Caen	Sang partly "I'm Not Twenty".
15 November 2003	Le Mans	France	Antarès	
16 November 2003	Orléans	France	Zénith d'Orléans	Sang partly "I'm Not Twenty".
18 November 2003	Tours	France	Grand Hall	
21 November 2003	Saint-Étienne	France	Palais des Spectacles	
22 November 2003	Grenoble	France	Summum	Sang partly "I'm Not Twenty".
23 November 2003	Lyon	France	Halle Tony Garnier	
25 November 2003	Albertville	France	Halle Olympique	
28 November 2003	Besançon	France	Salle des Spectacles de Micropolis	Sang partly "I'm Not Twenty".
29 November 2003	Strasbourg	France	Rhénus Sport	Sang partly "I'm Not Twenty".
30 November 2003	Mulhouse	France	Parc des Expositions	Sang partly "I'm Not Twenty".
2 December 2003	Dijon	France	Parc des Expositions	
5 December 2003	Nancy (Maxéville)	France	Zénith de Nancy	
6 December 2003	Chalon-sur-Saône	France	Parc des Expositions	Sang partly "I'm Not Twenty".
7 December 2003	Clermont-Ferrand	France	Parc des Expositions	
9 December 2003	Marsac-sur-l'Isle (Périgueux)	France	Parc des Expositions du Périgord	
12 December 2003	Langolvas (Morlaix)	France	Parc des Expositions de Langolvas	Sang partly "I'm Not Twenty".
13 December 2003	Lanester (Lorient)	France	Parc des Expositions de Lanester	
14 December 2003	Le Havre	France	Docks Océane	Concert was cut short because Alizée was ill.
16 December 2003	La Rochelle	France	Parc des Expositions	Sang partly "I'm Not Twenty".
19 December 2003	Beauvais	France	Elispace	
20 December 2003	Reims	France	Parc des Expositions	Alizée wore strange make-up and colored contact lenses. Sang partly "I'm Not Twenty".
17 January 2004	Paris	France	Zénith de Paris	Date added later.

=== Cancelled Concerts ===
Date	City	Country	Venue	Extra info
12 September 2003	Liège	Belgium	-	Announced but never on sale
10 January 2004	Cannes	France	La palestre	Cancelled during tour

== Reception ==
- AllMusic link
