= À contre-courant =

Single by Alizée

from the album Mes Courants Électriques
- Released: 7 October 2003
- Recorded: 2002
- Genre: French pop
- Length: 4:32
- Label: Polydor
- Songwriters: Mylène Farmer; Laurent Boutonnat
- Producers: Mylène Farmer; Laurent Boutonnat

Alizée singles chronology
"J'ai pas vingt ans" (2003)	"À contre-courant" (2003)	"Mademoiselle Juliette" (2007)

Music video
- "Alizée - A contre-courant (Clip Officiel HD)" on YouTube

"À contre-courant" (English: "Against the current") was released on 7 October 2003. It is the seventh single by French singer Alizée. It featured the single version of the song as well as "I'm Not Twenty", the English version of "J'ai pas vingt ans". Maxi CD of the single, released on 12 November 2003, included 3 remixes and the radio edit of the single.

On the cover art, the title of the song is written partly backwards (as "courant-ertnoc A") to symbolize the meaning of the title. This caused some confusion outside France among non-francophones; for example, time to time the single was found on sale listed as "Courant-ertnoc a", which obviously means nothing.

== Music video ==
The music video was shot in Triage-Lavoir de Péronnes, in Péronnes-lez-Binche, in Belgium. The video was directed by Pierre Stine, who also suggested the filming location. The video features Alizée following a young man through an old coal washing plant, while he performs acrobatics. The video was produced by Belgian production company Blueberry and AdnStudio. The video was filmed on 35mm film and the length of the video is 3:54.

The video premiered on M6 channel on 1 October 2003.

== Formats and track listings ==
French CD Single

1. "À contre-courant" – 4:32
2. "I'm Not Twenty" – 4:15

French CD maxi single

1. "À contre-courant" - 4:25
2. "À contre-courant" (Azzibo Da Bass Remix) – 7:15
3. "À contre-courant" (Steve Helstrip Club Remix) – 6:55
4. "À contre-courant" (Azzibo Da Bass Dub) – 6:05

French promotional CD

1. "À contre-courant" (radio edit) - 3:47

French promotional vinyl

1. "À contre-courant" (Azzibo Da Bass Remix) – 7:15
2. "À contre-courant" (Steve Helstrip Club Remix) – 6:55

French promotional VHS

1. "À contre-courant" - 3:54

== Charts ==
Chart performance for "À contre-courant"
Chart (2003)	Peak position
Belgium (Ultratip Bubbling Under Flanders)	10
Belgium (Ultratop 50 Wallonia)	20
France (SNEP)	9
Russia Airplay (TopHit)	46
Switzerland (Schweizer Hitparade)	64
