= Les collines (Never Leave You) =

Single by Alizée

from the album Une enfant du siècle
- Released: 8 March 2010
- Length: 3:13
- Songwriter(s): Angy Laperdrix, Guillaume de Maria, Julien Galinier and Raphael Vialla

Alizée singles chronology
| "Fifty-Sixty" (2008) | "Les collines (Never Leave You)" (2010) | "Limelight" (2010) |

Audio video
- "Alizée - Les Collines (Never Leave You) - "Album version"" on YouTube

"Les collines (Never Leave You)" (English: "The Hills (Never Leave You)") is the 12th single by the French singer Alizée, which was released in 2010. It was the first single from the Une enfant du siècle album. The single is electro-pop. It was composed by Angy Laperdrix, Guillaume de Maria, Julien Galinier and Raphael Vialla.

The single was praised by critics, with one writing that the song "gave new life to Alizée's career, a good buzz in radical change of style."
