= Mademoiselle Juliette =

Single by Alizée

from the album Psychédélices
- Released: 30 September 2007
- Genre: Pop
- Length: 3:05 (album version); 2:21 (radio edit)
- Label: RCA
- Songwriters: Jérémy Chatelain, Jean Fauque
- Producer: Jérémy Chatelain

Alizée singles chronology
"À contre-courant" (2003)	"Mademoiselle Juliette" (2007)	"Fifty-Sixty" (2008)

Audio video
- "Mademoiselle Juliette (Remastered 2022)" on YouTube

"Mademoiselle Juliette" (English: "Miss Juliet") is a song by French singer Alizée, which was released as the first single from her third studio album Psychédélices. It was released on 30 September 2007, Alizée's first single in 4 years, the last being "À contre-courant" which was released in October 2003.

== Release and promotion ==
The song was released on 30 September 2007. Alizée appeared on French radio station NRJ three days before the release to promote the song. The single was first made available in the online French music store of Virgin Megastores on 27 September 2007. However, it was rapidly removed a few hours later and was reported to be a mistake on Virgin's behalf. The song was later added back the day of the official release.

== Formats and track listings ==
French CD maxi single

1. "Mademoiselle Juliette" (Album version) – 3:05
2. "Mademoiselle Juliette" (Datsu Remix Radio Edit) – 3:22
3. "Mademoiselle Juliette" (Abz Remix) – 3:07
4. "Mademoiselle Juliette" (Potch & Easyjay Remix) – 3:06
5. "Mademoiselle Juliette" (Shazo Remix) – 4:20
6. "Mademoiselle Juliette" (Deefire 2 Remix) – 3:05
7. "Mademoiselle Juliette" (Datsu Remix – Extended version) – 4:48
8. "Mademoiselle Juliette" (Push Up Plump DJs Remix) – 7:24
9. "Mademoiselle Juliette" (Alber Kam Remix – Extended version) – 7:03

French 12" vinyl single (Limited edition picture disc)

A side

1. "Mademoiselle Juliette" (Radio edit) – 2:21
2. "Mademoiselle Juliette" (Push Up Plump DJs Dub Remix) – 7:20
3. "Mademoiselle Juliette" (Datsu Remix – Extended version) – 4:48
4. "Mademoiselle Juliette" (Shazo Remix) – 4:20
5. "Mademoiselle Juliette" (Deefire 2 Remix) – 3:05

B side

1. "Mademoiselle Juliette" (Push Up Plump DJs Remix) – 7:24
2. "Mademoiselle Juliette" (Alber Kam Remix – Extended version) – 7:03
3. "Mademoiselle Juliette" (Potch & Easyjay Remix) – 3:06
4. "Mademoiselle Juliette" (Acapella) – 3:05

== Music and structure ==
"Mademoiselle Juliette"
"Mademoiselle Juliette" begins with techno synths playing followed by vocals and drum beat, then progresses into a fast tempo electropop beat with twinkling synths played by guitars, synthesizer keyboards, and snare drums.

"Mademoiselle Juliette" is a pop song. The song is set in Common time with a tempo of 130 beats per minute. The song is written in the key of F major. The song begins with techno synths playing followed by vocals and drum beat, then progresses into a fast tempo electropop beat with twinkling synths played by guitars, synthesizer keyboards, and snare drums.

Lyrically, the song "Mademoiselle Juliette" portrays Juliet Capulet from Romeo and Juliet, the drama by William Shakespeare, as a girl who would rather party than worry about the Montague-Capulet dispute.

== Music video ==
The video was released on 19 November 2007. In the video Alizée is dancing and having fun in a French mansion. The music video was directed by Julien Rotterman and shot during one day on the north side of Paris, at the château of Champlâtreux. On 30 November 2007, Rotterman released a director's cut of the music video.

The video reached #1 on Latin MTV, on a show called Los 10 + Pedidos. On the same channel, it reached #138 in the countdown of the 150 most important videos in the past 15 years.

== Charts ==
The single debuted at #22 on the France Top 100 Singles chart. It only held its peak position for a week, later falling to #52, dropping thirty places. "Mademoiselle Juliette" then stayed on the charts for six more weeks, eventually dropping to #99 and leaving the chart afterward.

It debuted in thirteenth place on the French singles download chart. The single fell off the chart a week later. But after promotion of the album and single throughout late November and early December, Mademoiselle Juliette re-entered the French singles download chart at number 26. However, it fell off the charts quickly.

The single has also been released in Mexico as a CD single import.

=== Weekly charts ===
Chart (2007–08)	Peak position
Belgium (Ultratip Bubbling Under Wallonia)	4
CIS Airplay (TopHit)	44
France (SNEP)	22

=== Year-end charts ===
Chart (2008)	Position
CIS (Tophit)	195

== Reception ==
- Stéréology: Works quite well, as the first song "Mademoiselle Juliette" shows. Alizée with a slightly distorted voice, lots of synthesizers and a beat, then immediately swing dancing leaves. A great pop song that is immediately in the head, and there Ohrwurm pushes his mischief.
