= Parler tout bas =

Single by Alizée

from the album Gourmandises
- Released: April 2001
- Recorded: 2000
- Genre: French pop
- Length: 4:09
- Label: Universal, Polydor
- Songwriters: Laurent Boutonnat; Mylène Farmer
- Producers: Laurent Boutonnat; Mylène Farmer

Alizée singles chronology
"L'Alizé" (2000)	"Parler tout bas" (2001)	"Gourmandises" (2001)

Music video
- "Alizée - Parler tout bas (Clip Officiel HD)" on YouTube

"Parler tout bas" (English: "Speak Softly") is the third single by Alizée, released in April 2001. It featured an instrumental rendition of the song in addition to Alizée's solo rendering.

== Music video ==
The video for the song features Alizée in an outdoors bedroom with toys and later, in a forest. The subject of the video seems to be the little teddy bear in her arms. Her act of burying the teddy bear (later in the video, while in the forest) could be a sign of leaving childlike innocence behind.

- The actor in the video (Jérome Devoise) also appeared in the video for "Moi... Lolita".
- The video premiered on 25 April 2001 and was directed by Laurent Boutonnat. It premiered on M6.

== Track listings ==
CD single Polydor

1. "Parler tout bas" – 4:35
2. "Parler tout bas" (instrumental)" – 4:35

Digital download

1. "Parler tout bas" – 4:35

== Charts, certifications, sales ==
Chart (2001)	Peak position
Belgium (Ultratop 50 Wallonia)	15
France (SNEP) Singles Chart	12
Taiwan (Hit Fm Top 100)	9
Annual Chart	Position
2001 French SNEP Singles Chart	59

Region	Certification	Certified units/sales
France (SNEP)	Gold	250,000^{*}
^{*} Sales figures based on certification alone.
