= Gourmandises =

Studio album by Alizée
- Released: 21 November 2000
- Recorded: June–September 2000
- Studios: Studio Guillaume Tell, Suresnes
- Genres: Dance-pop; French pop
- Length: 44:23
- Labels: Polydor; Universal
- Producers: Laurent Boutonnat; Mylène Farmer

Alizée chronology
Gourmandises (2000)	Mes courants électriques (2003)

Singles from Gourmandises
- 1. "Moi... Lolita" Released: 4 July 2000; 2. "L'Alizé" Released: 28 November 2000; 3. "Parler tout bas" Released: April 2001; 4. "Gourmandises" Released: August 2001

Gourmandises (English: "Delicacies") is the debut album by the French recording artist Alizée, released worldwide on 13 March 2001 by Polydor Records. It was certified double Platinum by the Syndicat National de l'Édition Phonographique (SNEP) in December 2001, denoting sales of over a million copies in Europe.

Four singles were released from the album, including the global hits "Moi... Lolita", "L'Alizé" and "Gourmandises". To promote Gourmandises and her following album, Mes courants electriques, Alizée embarked on the En concert Tour in 2003. Gourmandises fuses electronic and pop music.

The singer and the album were honored by the highest accolade given by SACEM—the Prix Vincent Scotto in 2002. Alizée was nominated for the Victoires de la Musique in the "Revelation Album of the Year" category.

== Background and composition ==
Recording for the debut album started in mid-2000. The album included elements of world music, pop, chanson and dance. However, the album also incorporated strong elements of electronic music. Additionally, several genres and subgenres including techno, trip hop, drum and bass, ambient, rock and classical music influenced the album.

== Development ==
After Alizée's participation in the Graines de star show where she met Laurent Boutonnat and veteran French pop diva Mylène Farmer, she was invited to record a single with their support as a songwriting team. Her first two albums, which she worked on alongside Boutonnat and Farmer, had a lovely yet powerful voice that heavily included techno and pop music.

In July 2000 Alizée released the single "Moi... Lolita", and after achieving high sales in France, released her second single "L'Alizé" in December 2000. Three months later, her third single "Parler tout bas" also gained number 1 on French radio stations. The actual album Gourmandises was released in May 2001.

Alizée received public praise on television channel M6 and NRJ Radio. Among other nominations and awards, she was nominated for the Victoires de la Musique. The following year Alizée received the World Music Award from the IFPI for top sales. In 2003 Alizée received an award from SACEM the most prestigious recognition given for the institution the Prix Vincent Sotto.

== Singles ==
"Moi... Lolita" was the first track from the album and was released as her debut single on 4 July 2000. It was popular in various countries such as, France, Spain, Belgium, Georgia, Austria, the Netherlands, Lebanon, Ukraine, Turkey, Azerbaijan, Russia, Greece, Italy, Germany, Poland, Denmark, United Kingdom. "L'Alizé" was the second single from the album and was released in December 2000. It featured the song "L'alizé" as well as an instrumental version of the same track. Two limited editions were also released, which featured four remixes. The song became a hit particularly in France where it reached number 1 for two weeks. "Parler tout bas" was the third single by Alizée released in April 2001. It included an instrumental rendition of the song.

== Critical reception ==
The Daily Princetonian wrote that "Alizée is France's answer to the teen queen phenomenon."

== Legacy ==
Gourmandises gained Alizée worldwide fame while the album sold almost 1,000,000 copies in Europe. In early 2001, she won the NRJ Music Awards for Francophone Revelation. In late 2000 she won an M6 Award. The album was also nominated in a same category on Victoires de la Musique.

The album's debut single, "Moi... Lolita", generated international attention, peaking at number 2 in France. The single is listed as the 33rd best selling single in France. Also, the single "L'Alizé" stayed on top of the French charts for several weeks.

The French newspaper Le Figaro named Mylène Farmer as the French artist who had made the most revenue from the album's copyright in 2001, earning 10.4 million euros as a singer, songwriter, composer and producer of Alizée.

Gourmandises was certified Platinum in Europe, Gold in Belgium and Platinum in Switzerland.

== Track listing ==
All lyrics are written by Mylène Farmer; all music is composed by Laurent Boutonnat.

No.	Title	Length
1.	"Moi... Lolita"	4:27
2.	"Lui ou toi"	4:18
3.	"L'Alizé"	4:18
4.	"J.B.G."	4:00
5.	"Mon maquis"	5:44
6.	"Parler tout bas"	4:42
7.	"Veni Vedi Vici"	4:25
8.	"Abracadabra"	4:06
9.	"Gourmandises"	4:15
10.	"À quoi rêve une jeune fille"	4:09
Total length:		44:24

== Personnel ==
Credits adapted from Gourmandises liner notes.

- Alizée: Vocals, backing vocals (all songs)
- Laurent Boutonnat: keyboards, programming
- Bernard Paganotti: bass guitar
- Slim Pezin: guitar
- Matthieu Rabaté: drums
- Ann Calvert: chorus (on J.B.G. and Veni Vedi Vici)
- Emeline Chetaud: assistant to Laurent Boutonnat
- Engineered by Jérôme Devoise and Didier Lozahic
- Assistant engineers: Stéphane Briand & Denis Caribaux
- Mixed by Didier Lozahic (on "Lui ou toi" to "À quoi rêve une jeune fille")
- Mixed by Bertrand Châtenet (on "Moi... Lolita")
- Mastered by Bruno Gruel and André Perriat at Top Master, Paris
- Executive producer: Paul Van Parys for Requiem Publishing
- L.B.: photography
- Henry Neu for Com'N.B: cover design

== Charts and sales ==
In its first week of release, the album debuted at tenth place on the French Top 100 Albums Chart. Reaching number 1 in the ninth week and remaining there for the entire first month of its release, the album was certified Platinum. After being on the French charts throughout the year, the album hit Gold in Belgium and Platinum in Europe.

=== Weekly charts ===
Chart (2000–02)	Peak position
Austrian Albums Chart	40
Belgian Albums Chart (Wallonia)	7
Chinese Albums Chart	18
Dutch Albums Chart	36
Finnish Albums Chart	26
French Albums Chart	1
German Albums Chart	29
Hungarian Albums Chart	23
Italian Albums Chart	27
Japanese Albums Chart	40
Polish Albums Chart	13
Russian Albums Chart	9
South Korean Albums Chart	4
Spanish Albums Chart	22
Swiss Albums Chart	27

== Certifications and sales ==
Region	Certification	Certified units/sales
Belgium (BRMA)	Gold	25,000^{*}
France (SNEP)	2× Platinum	800,000
Switzerland (IFPI Switzerland)	Platinum	50,000^{^}
Summaries
Europe (IFPI)	Platinum	1,000,000^{*}
^{*} Sales figures based on certification alone.^{^} Shipments figures based on certification alone.

== Release history ==
Region	Date	Label	Format
France	28 November 2000	Polydor	CD
France	11 December 2020	Anaphore Music	Vinyl
United Kingdom	3 December 2000	Polydor	CD
Switzerland	3 December 2000	Polydor	CD
Belgium	3 December 2000	Polydor	CD
Europe	16 January 2001	Polydor	CD
Germany	12 February 2001	Polydor	CD
Asia	10 April 2001	Polydor	CD
Canada	25 June 2001	Universal Republic	CD

== See also ==
- List of best-selling albums in France
