= J'en ai marre! =

Single by Alizée

from the album Mes courants électriques
- Released: 21 February 2003
- Recorded: 2002
- Genre: French pop, dance-pop
- Length: 5:12
- Label: Polydor
- Songwriter: Mylène Farmer
- Producers: Mylène Farmer; Laurent Boutonnat

Alizée singles chronology
"Gourmandises" (2001)	"J'en ai marre!" (2003)	"J'ai pas vingt ans" (2003)

Music video
- "Alizée - J'en ai marre ! (Clip Officiel HD)" on YouTube

Music video
- "Alizée - I'm fed up ! (Official Video HD)" on YouTube

"J'en ai marre!" (English: "I'm fed up!") is a song performed by French singer Alizée, written by Mylène Farmer. Released in February 2003, the song is Alizée's fifth single as the lead artist, and was the first song from her second studio album Mes courants électriques. It charted at #4 in France and #2 in Japan.

The release included the single version of the song followed by an instrumental version. Later on, three remixes were made available in special editions of the single. Internationally, it was released as "I'm Fed Up!". In Japan, it was released as "Mon bain de mousse" ("My Foam Bath") along with a music video and a remix version of the song.

== Background ==
Alizée told MTV Spain that the song was released as her comeback single because of its upbeat sound.

== Content ==
Internationally, the song was released as the English language translation and re-recording "I'm Fed Up!".

The title translates as "I'm fed up". The English translation is artistic rather than literal, lacking both the wordplay and some of the darkness of Mylène Farmer's French. In particular, the French "extrémistes à deux balles" may be translated as "cheap/worthless extremists" though to whom this refers is open to speculation. The French "délits dociles" is a pun which may mean "docile offence" or "docile delight", and also echoes "de lit", "of bed", but the translation does not attempt to render this and replaces it by a simple filler, "Twisting up my toes". The whinging big sister and the idiomatic French "annoying people who roll(drive) at 2km/h" of the chorus are both replaced by a different character, a stressed-out uncle, with various different but similarly annoying complaints.

The translation does however introduce some of its own novel English wordplay such as "I’m foamely ecstatic", which captures the playfulness and cross-line phrasing of the French the "mon etat aquatique" from another section of the song.

== Live performances ==
The song is widely noted for its live TV performance routine which appeared on several French programmes including Top of the Pops in Germany. This featured distinctive choreography featuring a section of notable hip movement which, amongst other reactions, inspired the female Night Elf dance emote in the popular international video game World of Warcraft.

== Music video ==
The video, filmed on 4 February 2003 and directed by Olivier Megaton, premiered 19 February 2003 on M6. It is the first video for a song from Alizée's second album. During the filming of the clip, the artist harmed her knees due to lack of appropriate protection, which led to a swelling.

In the video, Alizée, dressed in a red jumpsuit, is enclosed in a glass cubicle, big enough for her to move freely; this scene represents a redfish swimming on an aquarium. Some scenes show her creeping against the glass wall, some show her throwing a tennis ball towards the wall; one particular scene shows her throwing a camera to the ground and smashing it in the process. Throughout the video, water is poured into the cubicle, making Alizée wet. In the middle of the video, i.e. towards the final chorus, Alizée punches the cubicle and it breaks.

== Formats and track listings ==
French CD Single

1. "J'en ai marre !" – 4:35
2. "J'en ai marre !" (Instrumental Mix) – 5:05

French CD maxi single

1. "J'en ai marre !" (Single Version) – 4:35
2. "J'en ai marre !" (Soft Skin Club Mix) – 7:40
3. "J'en ai marre !" (Bubbly Club Remix) – 7:50
4. "J'en ai marre !" (My Goldfish is Under me Remix) – 3:40

French 12" vinyl single

A Side:

1. "J'en ai marre !" (Soft Skin Club Mix) – 7:40

B Side:

1. "J'en ai marre !" (Bubbly Club Remix) – 7:50
2. "J'en ai marre !" (My Goldfish is Under me Remix) – 3:40

== Charts and sales ==
=== Weekly charts ===
Chart (2003)	Peak position
Austria (Ö3 Austria Top 40)	43
Belgium (Ultratop 50 Flanders)	18
Belgium (Ultratop 50 Wallonia)	5
France (SNEP)	4
Germany (GfK)	21
Hungary (Rádiós Top 40)	40
Italy (FIMI)	23
Poland (Polish Airplay Charts)	5
Sweden (Sverigetopplistan)	57
Switzerland (Schweizer Hitparade)	5

=== Year-end charts ===
Chart (2003)	Position
Belgium (Ultratop Flanders)	98
Belgium (Ultratop Wallonia)	29
France (SNEP)	38
Germany (Official German Charts)	78
Switzerland (Schweizer Hitparade)	89

=== Certifications ===
Region	Certification	Certified units/sales
Belgium (BRMA)	Gold	25,000^{*}
France (SNEP)	Gold	250,000^{*}
^{*} Sales figures based on certification alone.
