= Gourmandises (song) =

Single by Alizée

from the album Gourmandises
- Released: August 2001
- Recorded: 2000
- Genre: Dance-pop, French pop, electronic
- Length: 4:09
- Label: Universal, Polydor
- Songwriter(s): Lyrics: Mylène Farmer; Music: Laurent Boutonnat
- Producer(s): Laurent Boutonnat; Mylène Farmer

Alizée singles chronology
| "Parler tout bas" (2001) | "Gourmandises" (2001) | "J'en ai marre!" (2003) |

Music video
- "Alizée - Gourmandises (Clip Officiel HD)" on YouTube

"Gourmandises" (English: "Delicacies") is a song by French singer Alizée, released in 2001. Like Alizée's previous singles, this too features a single version and an instrumental rendering.

== Music video ==
The video for the single was directed by Nicolas Hidiroglou, and was premiered on 25 July 2001 in M6. The video was nominated in 2002 in the EFD awards. In the video Alizée is featured in a park with her friends, having a picnic complete with candy and fruits. Towards the last chorus of the video, all the delicacies spill, and Alizée and her friends run, play and laugh together. The entire video shows bliss.

== Formats and track listings ==
CD single (Polydor)

1. "Gourmandises" – 4:16
2. "Gourmandises" (Instrumental) – 4:10

CD-Maxi (Polydor)

1. "Gourmandises" (Single Version) – 4:10
2. "Gourmandises" (Les Baisers Dance Mix) – 8:25
3. "Gourmandises" (Loup y es-tu ? Groovy Mix) – 6:30
4. "Gourmandises" (Remix Gourmand) – 5:35

Digital single

1. "Gourmandises" – 4:16

French 12" vinyl single

A side

1. "Gourmandises" (Les Baisers Dance Mix) – 8:25

B side

1. "Gourmandises" (Single Version) – 4:10
2. "Gourmandises" (Loup y es-tu ? Groovy Mix) – 6:30

== Charts, certifications and sales ==
| Chart (2001) | Peak position |
|---|---|
| Belgian (Wallonia) Ultratop 40 Singles Chart | 21 |
| French SNEP Singles Chart | 14 |
| Annual Chart | Position |
| 2001 French SNEP Singles Chart | 59 |

| Region | Certification | Certified units/sales |
|---|---|---|
| France (SNEP) | Silver | 125,000^{*} |
^{*} Sales figures based on certification alone.
