= L'Alizé =

Single by Alizée

from the album Gourmandises
- Released: 28 November 2000
- Length: 3:49
- Label: Universal; Polydor
- Composer: Laurent Boutonnat
- Lyricist: Mylène Farmer
- Producers: Laurent Boutonnat; Mylène Farmer

Alizée singles chronology
"Moi... Lolita" (2000)	"L'Alizé" (2000)	"Parler tout bas" (2001)

Music video
- "Alizée - L'Alizé (Clip Officiel HD)" on YouTube

"L'Alizé" (English: "The Trade Wind") is the second single by French singer Alizée. Released in December 2000, it featured the song "L'alizé" as well as an instrumental version of it. Later two limited editions followed, which featured four remixes. The song became a hit particularly in France where it reached number-one for two weeks (becoming both the last number one hit of the year 2000 and the first of 2001).

== Music video ==
The video for the single is a rather simple video compared to the videos for the rest of her Gourmandises singles. Set against a pink backdrop, this time it features Alizée dressed in white and playing with bubbles. There is one scene in the video where she sings (with the band playing in the background). A lot of machinery (especially bubble machines) and slow camera movement were needed to put the video together. The video was directed by Pierre Stine and was first aired on 6 December 2000 during the show M6's Morning Live.

== Track listings ==
CD single – France

1. "L'alizé" – 4:15
2. "L'alizé" (version instrumentale) – 4:15

CD maxi – France

1. "L'alizé" – 4:15
2. "L'alizé" (vent d'amour club remix) – 5:15
3. "L'alizé" (sirocco house remix) – 4:50
4. "L'alizé" (sweet brise slow remix) – 4:55
5. "L'alizé" (dans le vent dance mix) – 5:16

CD maxi – Germany

1. "L'alizé" (radio edit) – 3:35
2. "L'alizé" (vent d'amour club remix) – 5:15
3. "L'alizé" (sunny season mix) – 5:25
4. "L'alizé" (sweet brise slow remix) – 4:55
5. "L'alizé" (dans le vent dance mix) – 5:16
6. "L'alizé" (single version) – 4:15

12" maxi – France

A side

1. "L'alizé" (vent d'amour club remix) – 5:15
2. "L'alizé" (single) – 4:15

B Side

1. "L'alizé" (sirocco house remix) – 4:50
2. "L'alizé" (sweet brise slow remix) – 4:55

== Charts ==
=== Weekly charts ===
Chart (2000–2001)	Peak position
Austria (Ö3 Austria Top 40)	52
Belgium (Ultratip Bubbling Under Flanders)	12
Belgium (Ultratop 50 Wallonia)	5
France (SNEP)	1
Germany (GfK)	43
Netherlands (Single Top 100)	63
Quebec (ADISQ)	32
Switzerland (Schweizer Hitparade)	23

=== Year-end charts ===
Chart (2000)	Position
France (SNEP)	53

Chart (2001)	Position
Belgium (Ultratop 50 Wallonia)	44
Europe (Eurochart Hot 100)	52
France (SNEP)	21

== Certifications ==
Region	Certification	Certified units/sales
France (SNEP)	Platinum	500,000^{*}
^{*} Sales figures based on certification alone.
