= Laurent Boutonnat =

French composer and director

Laurent Boutonnat (born 14 June 1961) is a French film score composer and music video director, best known as the songwriting partner of Mylène Farmer and the director of several music videos.

== Career ==
=== Early career and collaboration with Mylène Farmer ===
Laurent Boutonnat was born in Paris, France. At the age of 17, he directed his first film, Ballade de la Féconductrice, which was later screened off-competition at the Festival de Cannes. The graphic elements of the film would continue to characterize Boutonnat's style.

In 1984, Boutonnat and Jérôme Dahan began an artistic collaboration with an acting student, Mylène Farmer, and composed the song "Maman a tort" with Farmer as the vocalist. While Farmer had limited songwriting input on her first album, she thereafter wrote all her lyrics while Boutonnat composed and arranged the music.

Boutonnat also took charge of Farmer's visual image. He started directing long, big-budget, literature-inspired music videos that resembled short films, such as "Libertine" and "Pourvu qu'elles soient douces," in which the action takes place during the eighteenth century. Other videos such as "Ainsi soit je..." were praised for their simple visual language.

Boutonnat's videos for Farmer contained many nude and sexually provocative scenes, leading TV stations to ban them from airplay. In the early 1990s, following the promotion of Farmer and Boutonnat's hugely successful album "L'autre...", Farmer began working with different music video directors, though Boutonnat remained her songwriting partner. The last video he directed for her was "Beyond My Control," which was banned from daytime TV for violence and sex.

=== Feature film and later career ===
In 1994, Boutonnat directed his first feature film, Giorgino, based on an idea he had had for many years. Starring Farmer, Jeff Dahlgren, and Joss Ackland, the film was a critical and commercial flop, but its DVD release later made it a cult classic. Personally shaken by its failure, Boutonnat and Farmer parted ways. Farmer moved to the United States, where she started writing more lyrics and discovering new music. Shortly afterwards, she reconciled with Boutonnat and asked him to write the music for her lyrics again. Boutonnat did not direct the corresponding music videos for the songs they co-wrote.

Farmer and Boutonnat wrote Alizée's first two albums. Boutonnat also directed Alizée's music videos, which were more commercial and TV-friendly than those he had previously directed.

In 2001, Boutonnat directed his first video for Farmer since "Beyond My Control," the hit single "Les Mots," which Farmer recorded with Seal. The video contains many references to Le radeau de la méduse, a painting by Géricault.

In 2007, Boutonnat directed Jacquou le Croquant, his first feature film since 1994. Variety gave the film a positive review, describing it as "feisty family fare" with "pleasingly Dickensian" themes. The review highlighted the film as a "handsomely mounted, old-fashioned mini-epic", and praised its cinematography.

In December 2010, Farmer released her eighth album, Bleu Noir. This was the first time in her career that she did not collaborate with Boutonnat. The two reunited in 2012 to compose Monkey Me. However, Farmer's subsequent albums were again created without Boutonnat's involvement. Boutonnat served as the creative director for Mylène Farmer 2019. He and Farmer collaborated to create Julia's "S.E.X.T.O" in 2020.

Boutonnat is set to direct Wilde Versus England, a period drama film chronicling Oscar Wilde’s tumultuous final years.

== Productions ==
Music videos directed by Boutonnat
Title	Year
for Mylène Farmer
"Maman a tort"	1984
"Plus grandir"	1985
"Libertine"	1986
"Tristana"	1987
"Sans contrefaçon"	1987
"Ainsi soit je..."	1988
"Pourvu qu'elles soient douces"	1988
"Sans logique"	1988
"A quoi je sers..."	1989
"Allan"	1989
"Plus grandir (Mylène Farmer en concert)	1990
"Désenchantée"	1991
"Regrets"	1991
"Je t'aime mélancolie"	1991
"Beyond My Control"	1992
"Les Mots"	2001
"Pardonne-moi"	2001
"Du temps"	2011
"À l'ombre"	2012
"N'oublie pas"	2018
for Nathalie Cardone
"Hasta siempre"	1997
"Populaire"	1998
"...Mon ange"	1999
"Baila si"	2000
for Alizée
"Moi... Lolita"	2000
"Parler tout bas"	2001
"J'ai pas vingt ans"	2003
for Julia
"S.E.X.T.O"	2018
"Passe... comme tu sais"	2019
Et toi mon amour	2020

Theatrical films
Title	Year
Ballade de la Féconductrice	1978
Giorgino	1994
Jacquou le Croquant	2007

== Albums composed ==
Albums composed by Boutonnat
Title	Year
with Mylène Farmer
Cendres de lune	1986
Ainsi soit je...	1989
L'autre...	1991
Dance Remixes	1992
Anamorphosée	1995
Innamoramento	1999
Les mots	2001
Avant que l'ombre...	2005
Point de Suture	2008
Monkey Me	2012
with Nathalie Cardone
Album éponyme	1999
with Alizée
Gourmandises	2000
Mes courants électriques...	2003
with Julia
Passe... comme tu sais	2020
