= Moi... Lolita =

2000 single by Alizée

Single by Alizée

from the album Gourmandises
- Released: 3 July 2000
- Genre: French pop
- Length: 4:26
- Label: Polydor
- Composer: Laurent Boutonnat
- Lyricist: Mylène Farmer
- Producers: Laurent Boutonnat; Mylène Farmer

Alizée singles chronology
"Moi... Lolita" (2000)	"L'Alizé" (2000)

Music video
- "Moi... Lolita" on YouTube

"Moi... Lolita" (English: "Me... Lolita") is a song by French singer Alizée, released as her debut single in July 2000 from her first studio album, Gourmandises (2000). The single topped the charts in Italy and Spain while reaching the top five in Austria, Belgium, France, Germany, Moldova and the Netherlands.

== Background ==
In 1999, Alizée appeared on the M6 channel's talent show Graines de star. Initially she intended to sign up for the programme's dance contest, but that category was reserved for groups only. Alizée therefore joined the singing category instead, performing the song "Waiting for Tonight" by Jennifer Lopez and "Ma Prière" (a single released by Axelle Red in 1997). She went on to win the Meilleure Graine award for most promising young singing star of tomorrow.

Her winning performance was seen by Mylène Farmer and Laurent Boutonnat, who were looking for a young, fresh voice to partake in their new project. They approached Alizée, and she was selected after studio auditions.

== Composition ==
The song was instrumental in showcasing Alizée's image as that of a seductive Lolita character, referring to the 1955 novel Lolita by Vladimir Nabokov. The lyrics to the song also make several references to Farmer.

== Critical reception ==
Peter Robinson from NME acclaimed the song, stated: "It's pop as pop should be: the perfect marriage of innocence and experience of which the French, from Birkin to Paradis, have always seemed overwhelmingly capable. All this plus it has one of the most electrifying middle eights ever committed to record."

== Commercial performance ==
In France, "Moi... Lolita" peaked at number two for 13 nonconsecutive weeks on the SNEP Singles Chart, being unable to dislodge "Les Rois du monde" by Gregori Baquet, Damien Sargue and Philippe D'Avilan from the number-one spot. It stayed in the top five for 24 consecutive weeks, and when Alizée's following single, "L'Alizé", reached number one, "Moi... Lolita" was still at number three. The song was certified gold two months after its release by the Syndicat National de l'Édition Phonographique (SNEP). In the United Kingdom the song was acclaimed by the NME who recognised it with a "Single of the Week" award. It became a rare example of a foreign-language song to chart highly in the UK, peaking at number nine on the UK Singles Chart to become the highest-charting French-language song since 1995, when Celine Dion's "Pour que tu m'aimes encore" peaked at number seven.

== Music video ==
The video for the single was directed by Laurent Boutonnat and was first premiered on 26 July 2000 on M6. It shows Alizée in a nightclub dancing and having fun. In the first part of the video Alizée is running away from a man who professes his love for her and gives her a money bill when she asks for it. Later, she flees from her abusive mother, with her little sister, to a nightclub and starts to dance. The video ends with Alizée and the little girl leaving and the man from the beginning following them.

== Track listings ==
CD single – France

1. "Moi... Lolita" (single version)
2. "Moi... Lolita" (the piano version)

CD single – UK

1. "Moi... Lolita" (single version) – 4:16
2. "Moi... Lolita" (Lola extended remix) – 6:30
3. "Moi... Lolita" (Illicit full vocal mix) – 8:05
4. "Moi... Lolita" (CD rom video) – 4:50

CD maxi – Germany

1. "Moi... Lolita" (radio edit) – 3:40
2. "Moi... Lolita" (single version) – 4:16
3. "Moi... Lolita" (Lola extended remix) – 6:30
4. "Moi... Lolita" (hello helli t'es a dance mix) – 5:50
5. "Moi... Lolita" (Lolidub remix) – 3:45
6. "Moi... Lolita" (the piano version) – 4:20

== Charts ==
=== Weekly charts ===
2000–2002 weekly chart performance for "Moi... Lolita"
Chart (2000–2002)	Peak position
Austria (Ö3 Austria Top 40)	5
Belgium (Ultratop 50 Flanders)	4
Belgium (Ultratop 50 Wallonia)	2
Denmark (Tracklisten)	9
Europe (Eurochart Hot 100 Singles)	7
France (SNEP)	2
Germany (GfK)	5
Hungary (Rádiós Top 40)	15
Ireland (IRMA)	34
Italy (FIMI)	1
Netherlands (Dutch Top 40)	2
Netherlands (Single Top 100)	2
Poland Airplay (Music & Media)	3
Scottish Singles Sales (Official Charts)	6
Spain (Promusicae)	1
Sweden (Sverigetopplistan)	52
Switzerland (Schweizer Hitparade)	11
UK Singles (Official Charts)	9

2011 weekly chart performance for "Moi... Lolita"
Chart (2011)	Peak position
Poland (Polish Airplay New)	5

2023 weekly chart performance for "Moi... Lolita"
Chart (2023)	Peak position
Moldova Airplay (TopHit)	5

=== Monthly charts ===
2023 monthly chart performance for "Moi... Lolita"
Chart (2023)	Peak position
Moldova Airplay (TopHit)	5

=== Year-end charts ===
2000 year-end chart performance for "Moi... Lolita"
Chart (2000)	Position
Belgium (Ultratop 50 Wallonia)	6
Europe (Eurochart Hot 100 Singles)	20
France (SNEP)	3
Switzerland (Schweizer Hitparade)	28

2001 year-end chart performance for "Moi... Lolita"
Chart (2001)	Position
Austria (Ö3 Austria Top 40)	66
Belgium (Ultratop 50 Flanders)	16
Belgium (Ultratop 50 Wallonia)	96
Europe (Eurochart Hot 100 Singles)	29
France (SNEP)	52
Germany (Media Control)	38
Netherlands (Dutch Top 40)	6
Netherlands (Single Top 100)	14
Switzerland (Schweizer Hitparade)	82

2002 year-end chart performance for "Moi... Lolita"
Chart (2002)	Position
Austria (Ö3 Austria Top 40)	34
Europe (Eurochart Hot 100 Singles)	76
Germany (Media Control)	86
Italy (FIMI)	6
UK Singles (OCC)	161

2023 year-end chart performance for "Moi... Lolita"
Chart (2023)	Position
Moldova Airplay (TopHit)	109

=== Decade-end charts ===
Decade-end chart performance for "Moi... Lolita"
Chart (2000–2009)	Position
Netherlands (Single Top 100)	67

== Certifications and sales ==
Certifications for "Moi... Lolita"
Region	Certification	Certified units/sales
Belgium (BRMA)	2× Platinum	100,000^{*}
France (SNEP)	Diamond	1,200,000
Netherlands (NVPI)	Gold	40,000^{^}
Switzerland (IFPI Switzerland)	Platinum	50,000^{^}
Summaries
Worldwide	—	2,000,000
^{*} Sales figures based on certification alone.^{^} Shipments figures based on certification alone.
