= Danse avec les stars, la tournée =

Dance show tour

Danse avec les stars "La Tournée"
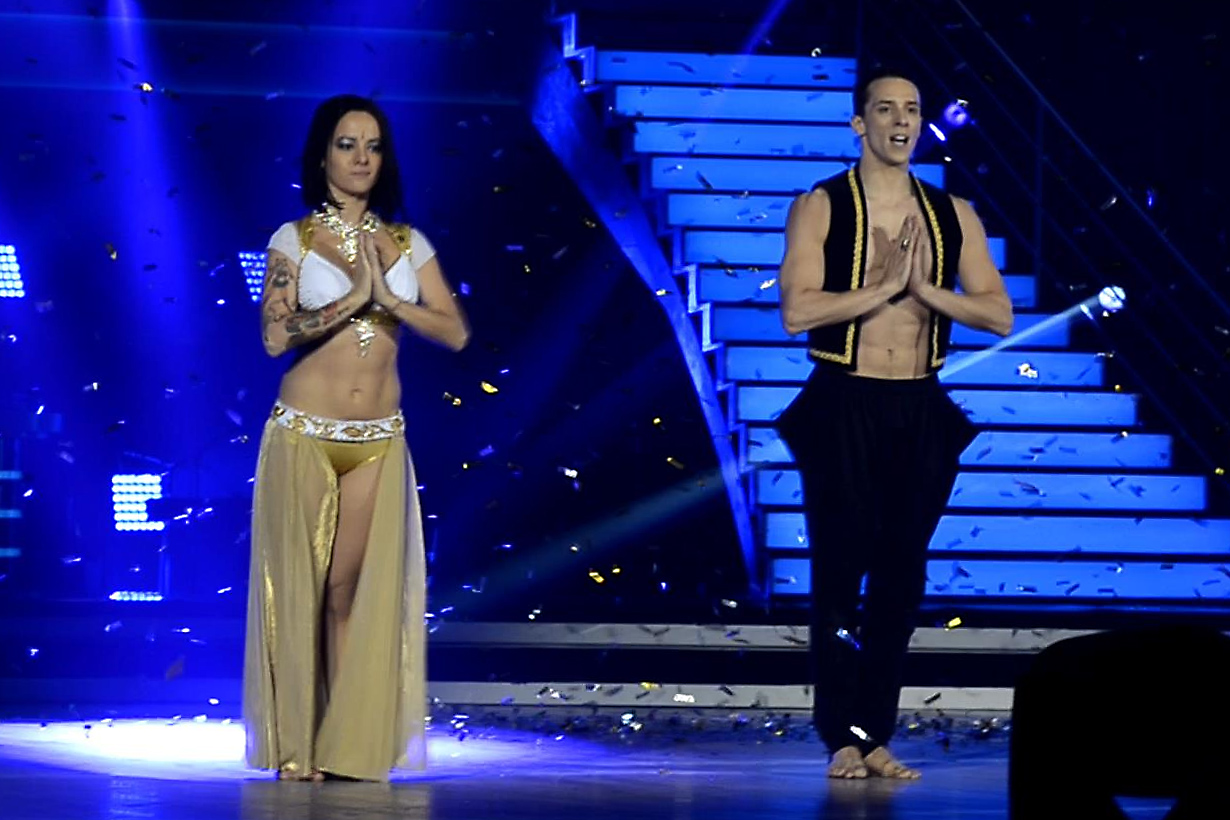
- Company: Cheyenne Productions
- Genre: Contemporary dance
- Show type: Touring show
- Date of premiere: 19 December 2013
- Location: France & Belgium

Other information
- Number of shows: 2013–2014: 21; 2014–2015: 27; 2016: 28; 2017: 28
- Official website

Danse avec les stars – La tournée is a dance show tour built upon the French show Danse avec les stars. The first tour had 21 shows, 20 in France and one in Belgium. The tour was announced in October 2013, during the fourth season of Danse avec les stars.

Stars from different seasons of Danse avec les stars joins the tour. With the stars, there are professional dancers, who also have participated the show during its seven seasons.

== Participants ==
Celebrity	2013–2014 shows / wins	2014–2015 shows / wins	2016 shows / wins	2017 shows / wins
Alizée	21 / 16	27 / 6	27 / – (Note: Did not participate the competition.)	28 / 6
Rayane Bensetti		27 / 19	19 / 14	
Priscilla Betti			28 / 7	10 / 2
Philippe Candeloro	8 / 0			4 / 0
Fabienne Carat			15 / 0	
Valérie Damidot				6 / 0
Olivier Dion			25 / 2	8 / 2
Karine Ferri				11 / 0
Baptiste Giabiconi				1 / 0
Louisy Joseph		13 / 0		
Brian Joubert		17 / 0	10 / 0	1 / 0
Tonya Kinzinger		27 / 0	injured (Note: Tonya Kinzinger was supposed to be part of the tour but was injured on the last practice, the day before the first show.)	11 / 2
Marie Lopez			14 / 0	
Lorie	13 / 1			
Camille Lou				2 / 0
Laurent Maistret				28 / 15
Lætitia Milot	16 / 0			
Florent Mothe				18 / 0
Loïc Nottet			6 / 5	1 / 1 (Note: Special TV show.)
Laurent Ournac	4 / 0			1 / 0
Nathalie Péchalat		17 / 1		
Damien Sargue	10 / 0	16 / 0		
Shy'm				1 / 0
Tal				1 / 0
Sylvie Tellier				10 / 0
Laury Thilleman	11 / 0			
Gérard Vivès	16 / 0	17 / 1		
Brahim Zaibat	11 / 4	2 / 0		

== Tour 2013–2014 ==
The tour had its opening evening on 19 December 2013 in Palais Omnisports de Paris-Bercy. After a small break the tour continued in January lasting till February. On 19 December, just before the first show in Paris-Bercy, the first additional show was announced for Lyon on 1 February. Another show for Lille also came on sale. For the first tour, originally four stars were announced to take a part of the tour; Lorie (season 3), Gérard Vivès (season 3), Brahim Zaibat (season 4) and Damien Sargue (season 4). After the victory of season 4, Alizée was announced to join the tour as well. Several other names were announced on the following week, including Laury Thilleman, Philippe Candeloro and Laurent Ournac.

The hosts for the show were the same as for the TV show, Sandrine Quétier and Vincent Cerutti. The jury was Jean-Marc Généreux, Chris Marques and his wife Jacklyn Spencer. After each dance the jury gave their votes but the winner of the show was decided by the public votes done by mobile phones.

=== Participants 2013–2014 ===
Celebrity	Profession	Partner	Season	Number of wins	Number of shows
Alizée	Singer	Grégoire Lyonnet	season 4	16	21
Brahim Zaibat	Dancer & choreographer	Katrina Patchett	season 4	4	11
Lorie	Singer, actress, & producer	Christian Millette	season 3	1	13
Philippe Candeloro	Olympic figure skater	Coralie Licata	season 2	0	8
Gérard Vivès	Actor & TV presenter	Silvia Notargiacomo	season 3	0	16
Lætitia Milot	Actress	Christophe Licata	season 4	0	7
Laurent Ournac	Actor	Denitsa Ikonomova	season 4	0	4
Laury Thilleman	Model	Maxime Dereymez	season 4	0	11
Damien Sargue	Singer	Candice Pascal	season 4	0	10

=== Shows 2013–2014 ===
Date	Time	City	Country	Venue	Winning couple (Note: At the end of each of the show, the audience can vote for free using their mobile phones to pick their favorite couple of the show.)	Participants (Celebrities)
19 December 2013	20:30	Paris	France	Palais Omnisports de Paris-Bercy	Alizeé & Grégoire Lyonnet	Alizée, Philippe Candeloro, Lætitia Milot, Damien Sargue, Gérard Vivès & Brahim Zaibat
11 January 2014	20:30	Nantes	France	Zénith de Nantes Métropole	Alizeé & Grégoire Lyonnet	Alizée, Lorie, Damien Sargue, Laury Thilleman, Gérard Vivès & Brahim Zaibat
12 January 2014	15:30	Nantes	France	Zénith de Nantes Métropole	Alizeé & Grégoire Lyonnet	Alizée, Lorie, Damien Sargue, Laury Thilleman, Gérard Vivès & Brahim Zaibat
17 January 2014	20:30	Nice	France	Palais Nikaïa	Alizeé & Grégoire Lyonnet	Alizée,
18 January 2014	20:30	Marseille	France	Le Dôme de Marseille	Brahim Zaibat & Katrina Patchett	Alizée, Lætitia Milot, Laurent Ournac, Laury Thilleman, Gérard Vivès & Brahim Zaibat
19 January 2014	15:30	Marseille	France	Le Dôme de Marseille	Alizeé & Grégoire Lyonnet	Alizée, Lætitia Milot, Laurent Ournac, Laury Thilleman, Gérard Vivès & Brahim Zaibat
23 January 2014	20:30	Montpellier	France	Park & Suites Arena	Alizeé & Grégoire Lyonnet	Alizée, Laurent Ournac,
25 January 2014	14:30	Lille	France	Zénith de Lille	Alizeé & Grégoire Lyonnet	Alizée, Philippe Candeloro, Lorie, Damien Sargue, Laury Thilleman & Gérard Vivès
25 January 2014	20:30	Lille	France	Zénith de Lille	Lorie & Christian Millette	Alizée, Philippe Candeloro, Lorie, Lætitia Milot, Damien Sargue, Laury Thilleman & Gérard Vivès
26 January 2014	15:30	Lille	France	Zénith de Lille	Alizeé & Grégoire Lyonnet	Alizée, Philippe Candeloro, Lorie, Lætitia Milot, Damien Sargue, Laury Thilleman & Gérard Vivès
29 January 2014	20:30	St-Etienne	France	Palais des Spectacles	Alizeé & Grégoire Lyonnet	Alizée,
31 January 2014	20:30	Lyon	France	Halle Tony Garnier	Brahim Zaibat & Katrina Patchett	Alizée, Philippe Candeloro, Lorie, Laury Thilleman, Gérard Vivès & Brahim Zaibat
1 February 2014	14:30	Lyon	France	Halle Tony Garnier	Alizeé & Grégoire Lyonnet	Alizée, Philippe Candeloro, Lorie, Laury Thilleman, Gérard Vivès & Brahim Zaibat
1 February 2014	20:30	Lyon	France	Halle Tony Garnier	Brahim Zaibat & Katrina Patchett	Alizée, Philippe Candeloro, Lorie, Laury Thilleman, Gérard Vivès & Brahim Zaibat
6 February 2014	20:30	Brussels	Belgium	Palais 12	Brahim Zaibat & Katrina Patchett	Alizée, Philippe Candeloro, Lorie, Laury Thilleman, Gérard Vivès & Brahim Zaibat
8 February 2014	20:30	Amnéville	France	Galaxie	Alizeé & Grégoire Lyonnet	Alizée, Lorie, Damien Sargue, Gérard Vivès & Brahim Zaibat
15 February 2014	20:30	Toulouse	France	Zénith de Toulouse	Alizeé & Grégoire Lyonnet	Alizée, Lorie,
16 February 2014	15:30	Toulouse	France	Zénith de Toulouse	Alizeé & Grégoire Lyonnet	Alizée, Lorie, Laurent Ournac, Damien Sargue & Gérard Vivès
20 February 2014	20:30	Strasbourg	France	Zénith de Strasbourg	Alizeé & Grégoire Lyonnet	Alizée,
22 February 2014	20:30	Rouen	France	Zénith de Rouen	Alizeé & Grégoire Lyonnet	Alizée, Lorie, Lætitia Milot, Damien Sargue, Gérard Vivès & Brahim Zaibat
23 February 2014	15:30	Rouen	France	Zénith de Rouen	Alizeé & Grégoire Lyonnet	Alizée, Lorie, Lætitia Milot, Damien Sargue, Gérard Vivès & Brahim Zaibat

=== Dances 2013–2014 ===
Couple	Style	Music
Alizée et Grégoire	Bollywood	Jai Ho! (You Are My Destiny) – The Pussycat Dolls
Alizée et Grégoire	Contemporary dance	Swan Lake – Pyotr Ilyich Tchaikovsky
Brahim et Katrina	Contemporary dance	Papaoutai – Stromae
Brahim et Katrina	Cha-cha-cha	Boogie Wonderland – Earth, Wind and Fire
Damien et Candice	Foxtrot	Feeling Good – Nina Simone
Damien et Candice	Contemporary dance	Formidable – Stromae
Gérard et Silvia	Rumba	Love actually – Craig Armstrong
Gérard et Silvia	Tango	The Imperial March – John Williams
Laëtitia et Christophe	Rumba	You Call It Love – Karoline Krüger
Laëtitia et Christophe	Disco	Disco Inferno – The Trammps
Laurent et Denitsa	Waltz	A Corps Perdu – Grégory Lemarchal
Laurent et Denitsa	Jive	Kiss You – One Direction
Laury et Maxime	Quickstep	A Little Party Never Killed Nobody (All We Got) – Fergie
Laury et Maxime	Cha-cha-cha	Get Lucky – Daft Punk
Lorie et Christian	American Smooth	Si seulement je pouvais lui manquer – Calogero
Lorie et Christian	Cha-cha-cha	Back in Time – Pitbull
Philippe et Coralie	Paso Doble	Indiana Jones
Philippe et Coralie	Cha-cha-cha	I'm So Excited – The Pointer Sisters

== Tour 2014–2015 ==
For the second tour, there were 28 confirmed shows. Three of them were private shows, of which one was cancelled because of the Charlie Hebdo shooting. The tour started from Nantes on 20 December 2014 and it ended in Rouen on 28 February 2015. Like during previous tour, there was a small break after the first show before continuing the tour around France. The tour also had a show in Brussels, Belgium.

10 September 2014, Alizée announced to join the tour for all the dates starting from Nantes.

20 December 2014, Nathalie Péchalat announced to join the tour in Nice, Marseille, Paris, Bordeaux, Lyon, Montpellier and Rouen.

The hosts for the show were the same as for the TV show, Sandrine Quétier and Vincent Cerutti. The jury was Jean-Marc Généreux, Chris Marques and his wife Jacklyn Spencer. After each dance the jury gave their votes but the winner of the show was decided by the public votes done by mobile phones.

=== Participants 2014–2015 ===
Celebrity	Profession	Partner	Season	Number of wins	Number of shows
Rayane Bensetti	Actor	Denitsa Ikonomova	season 5	19	27
Alizée	Singer	Grégoire Lyonnet	season 4	6	27
Nathalie Péchalat	Olympic ice dancer	Christophe Licata	season 5	1	17
Gérard Vivès	Actor & TV presenter	Silvia Notargiacomo	season 3	1	17
Brian Joubert	Olympic figure skater	Katrina Patchett	season 5	0	17
Tonya Kinzinger	Actress & TV presenter	Maxime Dereymez	season 5	0	27
Louisy Joseph	Singer	Guillaume Foucault	season 5	0	13
Brahim Zaibat	Dancer & choreographer	Katrina Patchett	season 4	0	2
Damien Sargue	Singer	Candice Pascal	season 4	0	16

=== Shows 2014–2015 ===
List of shows.

Date	Time	City	Country	Venue	Winning couple	Participants (Celebrities)
20 December 2014	15:00	Nantes	France	Zénith Nantes Métropole	Rayane Bensetti & Denitsa Ikonomova	Alizée, Rayane Bensetti, Louisy Joseph, Tonya Kinzinger, Damien Sargue, Brahim Zaibat
20 December 2014	20:30	Nantes	France	Zénith Nantes Métropole	Rayane Bensetti & Denitsa Ikonomova	Alizée, Rayane Bensetti, Louisy Joseph, Tonya Kinzinger, Damien Sargue, Brahim Zaibat
6 January 2015 (Note: A private show for #specialvoeux2015 by the mayor of Nice.)	20:30	Nice	France	Palais Nikaïa	Alizée & Grégoire Lyonnet	Alizée, Rayane Bensetti, Louisy Joseph, Tonya Kinzinger, Nathalie Péchalat, Damien Sargue
8 January 2015	20:30	Nice	France	Palais Nikaïa	Alizée & Grégoire Lyonnet	Alizée, Rayane Bensetti, Louisy Joseph, Tonya Kinzinger, Nathalie Péchalat, Damien Sargue
9 January 2015	20:30	Marseille	France	Le Dôme de Marseille	Alizée & Grégoire Lyonnet	Alizée, Rayane Bensetti, Louisy Joseph, Tonya Kinzinger, Nathalie Péchalat, Damien Sargue
10 January 2015	20:30	Marseille	France	Le Dôme de Marseille	Nathalie Péchalat & Christophe Licata	Alizée, Rayane Bensetti, Louisy Joseph, Tonya Kinzinger, Nathalie Péchalat, Damien Sargue
15 January 2015	20:00	Brussels	Belgium	Forest National	Alizée & Grégoire Lyonnet	Alizée, Rayane Bensetti, Brian Joubert, Tonya Kinzinger, Damien Sargue, Gérard Vives
16 January 2015	20:30	Lille	France	Zénith de Lille	Rayane Bensetti & Denitsa Ikonomova	Alizée, Rayane Bensetti, Brian Joubert, Tonya Kinzinger, Damien Sargue, Gérard Vives
17 January 2015	15:00	Lille	France	Zénith de Lille	Alizée & Grégoire Lyonnet	Alizée, Rayane Bensetti, Louisy Joseph, Brian Joubert, Tonya Kinzinger, Gérard Vives
17 January 2015	20:30	Lille	France	Zénith de Lille	Rayane Bensetti & Denitsa Ikonomova	Alizée, Rayane Bensetti, Louisy Joseph, Brian Joubert, Tonya Kinzinger, Gérard Vives
23 January 2015	20:30	Amnéville	France	Galaxie	Rayane Bensetti & Denitsa Ikonomova	Alizée, Rayane Bensetti, Louisy Joseph, Tonya Kinzinger, Damien Sargue, Gérard Vives
24 January 2015	20:30	Strasbourg	France	Le Zénith de Strasbourg	Rayane Bensetti & Denitsa Ikonomova	Alizée, Rayane Bensetti, Louisy Joseph, Tonya Kinzinger, Damien Sargue, Gérard Vives
30 January 2015	20:30	Paris	France	Zénith de Paris	Alizée & Grégoire Lyonnet	Alizée, Rayane Bensetti, Brian Joubert, Tonya Kinzinger, Nathalie Péchalat, Gérard Vives
31 January 2015	15:00	Paris	France	Zénith de Paris	Rayane Bensetti & Denitsa Ikonomova	Alizée, Rayane Bensetti, Brian Joubert, Tonya Kinzinger, Nathalie Péchalat, Gérard Vives
31 January 2015	20:30	Paris	France	Zénith de Paris	Rayane Bensetti & Denitsa Ikonomova	Alizée, Rayane Bensetti, Brian Joubert, Tonya Kinzinger, Nathalie Péchalat, Gérard Vives
6 February 2015	20:30	Bordeaux	France	Patinoire	Rayane Bensetti & Denitsa Ikonomova	Alizée, Rayane Bensetti, Brian Joubert, Tonya Kinzinger, Nathalie Péchalat, Gérard Vives
7 February 2015	15:00	Bordeaux	France	Patinoire	Rayane Bensetti & Denitsa Ikonomova	Alizée, Rayane Bensetti, Tonya Kinzinger, Nathalie Péchalat, Gérard Vives (Note: Both shows on 7 February had only five couples dancing because Brian Joubert had to participate figure skating gala in Grenoble.)
7 February 2015	20:30	Bordeaux	France	Patinoire	Rayane Bensetti & Denitsa Ikonomova	Alizée, Rayane Bensetti, Tonya Kinzinger, Nathalie Péchalat, Gérard Vives
13 February 2015	20:30	Lyon	France	Halle Tony Garnier	Rayane Bensetti & Denitsa Ikonomova	Alizée, Rayane Bensetti, Louisy Joseph, Brian Joubert, Tonya Kinzinger, Nathalie Péchalat
14 February 2015	15:00	Lyon	France	Halle Tony Garnier	Rayane Bensetti & Denitsa Ikonomova	Alizée, Rayane Bensetti, Louisy Joseph, Brian Joubert, Tonya Kinzinger, Nathalie Péchalat
14 February 2015	20:30	Lyon	France	Halle Tony Garnier	Rayane Bensetti & Denitsa Ikonomova	Alizée, Rayane Bensetti, Louisy Joseph, Brian Joubert, Tonya Kinzinger, Nathalie Péchalat
18 February 2015 (Note: Danse avec les stars returned to Nice for the Nice Carnival. A private show.)	15:30	Nice	France	Palais Nikaïa	Rayane Bensetti & Denitsa Ikonomova	Alizée, Rayane Bensetti, Brian Joubert, Tonya Kinzinger, Nathalie Péchalat, Damien Sargue
19 February 2015	20:30	Montpellier	France	Park & Suites Arena	Rayane Bensetti & Denitsa Ikonomova	Alizée, Rayane Bensetti, Brian Joubert, Tonya Kinzinger, Nathalie Péchalat, Damien Sargue, Gérard Vives
20 February 2015	20:30	Toulouse	France	Zénith de Toulouse	Rayane Bensetti & Denitsa Ikonomova	Alizée, Rayane Bensetti, Brian Joubert, Tonya Kinzinger, Damien Sargue, Gérard Vives
21 February 2015	20:30	Toulouse	France	Zénith de Toulouse	Rayane Bensetti & Denitsa Ikonomova	Alizée, Rayane Bensetti, Brian Joubert, Tonya Kinzinger, Damien Sargue, Gérard Vives
27 February 2015	20:30	Rouen	France	Zénith de Rouen	Rayane Bensetti & Denitsa Ikonomova	Alizée, Rayane Bensetti, Brian Joubert, Tonya Kinzinger, Nathalie Péchalat, Damien Sargue, Gérard Vives
28 February 2015	20:30	Rouen	France	Zénith de Rouen	Gérard Vives & Silvia Notargiacomo	Alizée, Rayane Bensetti, Brian Joubert, Tonya Kinzinger, Nathalie Péchalat, Damien Sargue, Gérard Vives

=== Private shows 2014–2015 ===
Additional to the officially announced shows, which one could buy tickets for, there are/were some other private shows arranged for guests. Below are listed known events.

Date	Time	City	Country	Venue	Winning couple	Participants (Celebrities)
6 January 2015	20:30	Nice	France	Palais Nikaïa	Alizée & Grégoire Lyonnet	Alizée, Rayane Bensetti, Louisy Joseph, Tonya Kinzinger, Nathalie Péchalat, Damien Sargue
7 January 2015 (Note: A private show was canceled because of Charlie Hebdo shooting.)	20:30	Nice	France	Palais Nikaïa	-	-
18 February 2015	15:30	Nice	France	Palais Nikaïa	Rayane Bensetti & Denitsa Ikonomova	Alizée, Rayane Bensetti, Brian Joubert, Tonya Kinzinger, Nathalie Péchalat, Damien Sargue

=== Dances 2014–2015 ===
Couple	Style	Music
Alizée & Grégoire	Jive	Shake It Off – Taylor Swift
Alizée & Grégoire	Contemporary dance	Wasting My Young Years – London Grammar
Brahim & Katrina	Contemporary dance	Iron – Woodkid
Brahim & Katrina	Cha Cha Cha	Love Never Felt So Good – Michael Jackson
Brian & Katrina	Argentine tango	Tous les memes – Stromae
Brian & Katrina	Contemporary dance	Every Breath You Take – The Police (Sting's song)
Damien & Candice	Tango	Addicted to You – Avicii
Damien & Candice	Rumba	Crazy in Love for the film Fifty Shades of Grey – Amalya Delepierre
Gérard & Silvia	Rumba	I Dreamed a Dream – Idina Menzel & Lea Michele (Glee's cover)
Gérard & Silvia	Cha Cha Cha	Ain't No Mountain High Enough
Louisy & Guillaume	Cha Cha Cha	Dare (La La La) – Shakira
Louisy & Guillaume	Jive	Halo – Beyoncé's cover
Nathalie & Christophe	Tango/Pasodoble	Sweet Dreams – Eurythmics
Nathalie & Christophe	Rumba/Cha Cha Cha	Le Temps qui court – Alain Chamfort from Les Enfoirés
Rayane & Denitsa	Bollywood	Mundian To Bach Ke (Knight Rider Bhangra) – Panjabi MC
Rayane & Denitsa	Jive	Footloose – Kenny Loggins
Tonya & Maxime	Rumba	Drunk in Love – Beyoncé Ft Jay-Z
Tonya & Maxime	Foxtrot	Vole – Celine Dion

== Tour 2016 ==
On the third tour, there were 28 shows. This time the tour started from Marseille on 9 January 2016 and it ended in Toulouse on 5 March 2016. The tour also had a show in Brussels, Belgium.

The jury had four persons this year. Fauve Hautot joined the jury along Jean-Marc Généreux, Chris Marques and his wife Jacklyn Spencer. After each dance the jury gave their votes but the winner of the show was decided by the public votes done by mobile phones. The hosts of the shows were Sandrine Quétier and Laurent Ournac, who replaced Vincent Cerutti. Each show had only one host, either Sandrine or Laurent.

Tonya Kinzinger was injured during the last practice, a night before the tour opening show in Marseille. She was unable to continue the tour.

Alizée & Grégoire Lyonnet did not take part in the competition during the show, and hence it wasn't possible to vote for them, with exception of the first show in Marseille. On 19 January, Alizée clarified that she did not want to join the competition after doing it twice already but she was pleased to join the tour as a guest dancer. In the same interview she told that Chris Marques had asked her to replace Tonya Kinzinger, who got injured. 22 February in Paris her name appeared on the voting page again, suggesting that she took part in the competition but she still had only one dance, which got no rating by the judges. Also, after Paris, her name didn't appear on the voting page again. In some shows, during the presentation of her dance with Grégoire, the host told that Alizée was on the tour just for the passion to dance and not as part of the competition.

=== Participants 2016 ===
Celebrity	Profession	Partner	Season	Number of wins	Number of shows
Rayane Bensetti	Actor	Denitsa Ikonomova	season 5	14	19
Priscilla Betti	Singer & actress	Christophe Licata	season 6	7	28
Loïc Nottet	Singer	Denitsa Ikonomova	season 6	5	6
Olivier Dion	Model & singer	Candice Pascal	season 6	2	25
Fabienne Carat	Actress	Julien Brugel	season 6	0	15
Marie Lopez	Internet personality	Yann Alrick Mortreuil	season 6	0	14
Brian Joubert	Olympic figure skater	Katrina Patchett	season 5	0	10
Alizée (Note: Alizée & Grégoire were on the tour as guests and didn't take part in the competition.)	Singer	Grégoire Lyonnet	season 4	-	27

=== Shows 2016 ===
List of shows.

Date	Time	City	Country	Venue	Winning couple	Participants (Celebrities)
9 January 2016	15:00	Marseille	France	Le Dôme de Marseille	Rayane Bensetti & Denitsa Ikonomova	Alizée, Rayane Bensetti, Priscilla Betti, Fabienne Carat, EnjoyPhoenix
9 January 2016	20:30	Marseille	France	Le Dôme de Marseille	Rayane Bensetti & Denitsa Ikonomova	Alizée, Rayane Bensetti, Priscilla Betti, Fabienne Carat, EnjoyPhoenix
15 January 2016	20:30	Nantes	France	Zénith Nantes Métropole	Rayane Bensetti & Denitsa Ikonomova	Alizée, Rayane Bensetti, Priscilla Betti, Olivier Dion, EnjoyPhoenix
16 January 2016	20:30	Nantes	France	Zénith Nantes Métropole	Priscilla Betti & Christophe Licata	Alizée, Rayane Bensetti, Priscilla Betti, Olivier Dion, EnjoyPhoenix
22 January 2016	20:30	Paris	France	Zénith de Paris	Rayane Bensetti & Denitsa Ikonomova	Alizée, Rayane Bensetti, Priscilla Betti, Olivier Dion, Brian Joubert
23 January 2016	15:00	Paris	France	Zénith de Paris	Loïc Nottet & Denitsa Ikonomova	Alizée, Priscilla Betti, Olivier Dion, EnjoyPhoenix, Loïc Nottet
23 January 2016	20:30	Paris	France	Zénith de Paris	Loïc Nottet & Denitsa Ikonomova	Alizée, Priscilla Betti, Olivier Dion, EnjoyPhoenix, Loïc Nottet
24 January 2016	15:00	Paris	France	Zénith de Paris	Rayane Bensetti & Denitsa Ikonomova	Alizée, Rayane Bensetti, Priscilla Betti, Fabienne Carat, Olivier Dion
29 January 2016	20:30	Amnéville	France	Galaxie	Rayane Bensetti & Denitsa Ikonomova	Alizée, Rayane Bensetti, Priscilla Betti, Olivier Dion, Brian Joubert
30 January 2016	20:30	Strasbourg	France	Le Zénith de Strasbourg	Priscilla Betti & Christophe Licata	Alizée, Rayane Bensetti, Priscilla Betti, Olivier Dion, Brian Joubert
4 February 2016	20:00	Brussels	Belgium	Forest National	Loïc Nottet & Denitsa Ikonomova	Alizée, Priscilla Betti, Fabienne Carat, Olivier Dion, Brian Joubert, Loïc Nottet
5 February 2016	20:30	Lille	France	Zénith de Lille	Priscilla Betti & Christophe Licata	Alizée, Priscilla Betti, Fabienne Carat, Olivier Dion, Brian Joubert
6 February 2016	15:00	Lille	France	Zénith de Lille	Priscilla Betti & Christophe Licata	Alizée, Rayane Bensetti, Priscilla Betti, Olivier Dion, Brian Joubert
6 February 2016	20:30	Lille	France	Zénith de Lille	Priscilla Betti & Christophe Licata	Alizée, Rayane Bensetti, Priscilla Betti, Olivier Dion, Brian Joubert
7 February 2016	15:00	Lille	France	Zénith de Lille	Rayane Bensetti & Denitsa Ikonomova	Alizée, Rayane Bensetti, Priscilla Betti, Olivier Dion, Brian Joubert
12 February 2016	20:30	Bordeaux	France	Patinoire	Rayane Bensetti & Denitsa Ikonomova	Alizée, Rayane Bensetti, Priscilla Betti, Fabienne Carat, Olivier Dion
13 February 2016	15:00	Bordeaux	France	Patinoire	Rayane Bensetti & Denitsa Ikonomova	Alizée, Rayane Bensetti, Priscilla Betti, Fabienne Carat, Olivier Dion
13 February 2016	20:30	Bordeaux	France	Patinoire	Rayane Bensetti & Denitsa Ikonomova	Alizée, Rayane Bensetti, Priscilla Betti, Fabienne Carat, Olivier Dion
19 February 2016	20:30	Rouen	France	Zénith de Rouen	Rayane Bensetti & Denitsa Ikonomova	Alizée, Rayane Bensetti, Priscilla Betti, Fabienne Carat, Olivier Dion, EnjoyPhoenix
20 February 2016	20:30	Rouen	France	Zénith de Rouen	Rayane Bensetti & Denitsa Ikonomova	Alizée, Rayane Bensetti, Priscilla Betti, Olivier Dion, EnjoyPhoenix
24 February 2016	20:30	Nice	France	Palais Nikaïa	Priscilla Betti & Christophe Licata	Alizée, Rayane Bensetti, Priscilla Betti, Fabienne Carat, Olivier Dion
25 February 2016	20:30	Montpellier	France	Park & Suites Arena	Loïc Nottet & Denitsa Ikonomova	Alizée, Priscilla Betti, Fabienne Carat, Olivier Dion, Loïc Nottet
26 February 2016	20:30	Lyon	France	Halle Tony Garnier	Rayane Bensetti & Denitsa Ikonomova	Alizee, Rayane Bensetti, Priscilla Betti, Olivier Dion, EnjoyPhoenix
27 February 2016	15:00	Lyon	France	Halle Tony Garnier	Loïc Nottet & Denitsa Ikonomova	Priscilla Betti, Fabienne Carat, Olivier Dion, EnjoyPhoenix, Loïc Nottet
27 February 2016	20:30	Lyon	France	Halle Tony Garnier	Olivier Dion & Candice Pascal	Alizée, Priscilla Betti, Fabienne Carat, Olivier Dion, EnjoyPhoenix, Loïc Nottet
28 February 2016	15:00	Lyon	France	Halle Tony Garnier	Rayane Bensetti & Denitsa Ikonomova	Alizée, Rayane Bensetti, Priscilla Betti, Olivier Dion, EnjoyPhoenix
4 March 2016	20:30	Toulouse	France	Zénith de Toulouse	Olivier Dion & Candice Pascal	Alizée, Priscilla Betti, Fabienne Carat, Olivier Dion, EnjoyPhoenix, Brian Joubert
5 March 2016	20:30	Toulouse	France	Zénith de Toulouse	Priscilla Betti & Christophe Licata	Alizée, Priscilla Betti, Fabienne Carat, EnjoyPhoenix, Brian Joubert

=== Dances 2016 ===
Couple	Style	Music
Alizée & Grégoire Lyonnet	Charleston (only in Marseille & Nantes)	Bang Bang – will.i.am
Alizée & Grégoire Lyonnet	Rumba (all the shows starting from Paris)	Christine – Christine and the Queens
Brian Joubert & Katrina Patchett	Foxtrot	New York – Frank Sinatra
Brian Joubert & Katrina Patchett	Rumba	Homeless – Marina Kaye
Fabienne Carat & Julien Brugel	Disco	You Should Be Dancing – Bee Gees
Fabienne Carat & Julien Brugel	Samba	Andalouse – Kendji Girac
Loïc Nottet & Denitsa Ikonomova	Contemporary dance	Chandelier – Sia
Loïc Nottet & Denitsa Ikonomova	Tango (with Silvia Notargiacomo)	Carmen – Stromae
Marie Lopez & Yann-Alrick Mortreuil	Foxtrot	Alice's Theme (Alice in Wonderland) – Danny Elfman
Marie Lopez & Yann-Alrick Mortreuil	Waltz	Hallelujah – Jeff Buckley
Olivier Dion & Candice Pascal	Bollywood	Jai Ho! (You Are My Destiny) – The Pussycat Dolls
Olivier Dion & Candice Pascal	Tango	Toxic – Britney Spears
Priscilla Betti & Christophe Licata	Contemporary Dance	Libérée, délivrée (French version of Frozen theme song) – Anaïs Delva
Priscilla Betti & Christophe Licata	Freestyle	Your Song – Elton John
Rayane Bensetti & Denitsa Ikonomova	Contemporary dance	The Hills – The Weeknd
Rayane Bensetti & Denitsa Ikonomova	Foxtrot/Charleston/Hip-hop	Why Don't You – Gramophonedzie

== Tour 2017 ==
Fourth tour had 28 shows, 27 in France and one in Belgium, like last year. The venues were mostly the same as on previous year but the order had slightly been changed. The judges for the tour were Jean-Marc Généreux, Chris Marques and Jacklyn Spencer, except on the Le grand show which had Jean-Marc Généreux, Chris Marques, Fauve Hautot and Marie-Claude Pietragalla.

Alizée and Laurent Maistret were the only celebrities to join all the 28 shows of the tour.

=== Participants 2017 ===
Celebrity	Profession	Partner	Season	Number of wins	Number of shows
Laurent Maistret	TV personality	Marie Denigot (Denitsa Ikonomova in Orléans & Clermont-Ferrand)	season 7	15	28
Alizée	Singer	Grégoire Lyonnet	season 4	6	28
Priscilla Betti	Singer & actress	Christophe Licata	season 6	2	10
Olivier Dion	Model & singer	Candice Pascal	season 6	2	11
Tonya Kinzinger	Actress & TV presenter	Maxime Dereymez	season 5	2	11
Loïc Nottet	Singer	Denitsa Ikonomova	season 6	1	1
Valérie Damidot	TV presenter	Christian Millette	season 7	0	3
Karine Ferri	TV presenter	Yann-Alrick Mortreuil	season 7	0	12
Florent Mothe	Singer & actor	Candice Pascal	season 7	0	19
Sylvie Tellier	Model	Christophe Licata	season 7	0	16

Along the regular dancers, Philippe Candeloro, Baptiste Giabiconi, Brian Joubert, Camille Lou, Laurent Ournac, Shy'm and Tal participated for Le grand show held in Clermont-Ferrand on 4 February. Camille Lou made an appearance also in Orléans, 3 February, but she was not part of the competition. Philippe Candeloro participated in Toulouse and Bordeaux, he did not participate the competition.

=== Shows 2017 ===
The show on 4 February in Clermont-Ferrand is a special televised show, including 11 celebrities and four judges (Fauve Hautot, Jean-Marc Généreux, Marie-Claude Pietragalla and Chris Marques). The show is broadcast live on TF1 channel in France.

Date	Time	City	Country	Venue	Winning couple	Participants (Celebrities)
7 January 2017	15:00	Nantes	France	Le Zénith Nantes Métropole	Laurent Maistret & Marie Denigot	Alizée, Priscilla Betti, Laurent Maistret, Florent Mothe & Sylvie Tellier
7 February 2017	20:30	Nantes	France	Le Zénith Nantes Métropole	Laurent Maistret & Marie Denigot	Alizée, Priscilla Betti, Laurent Maistret, Florent Mothe & Sylvie Tellier
13 January 2017	20:00	Brussels	Belgium	Forest National	Laurent Maistret & Marie Denigot	Alizée, Priscilla Betti, Laurent Maistret, Florent Mothe & Sylvie Tellier
14 January 2017	16:00	Rouen	France	Zénith de Rouen	Priscilla Betti & Christophe Licata	Alizée, Priscilla Betti, Laurent Maistret, Florent Mothe & Sylvie Tellier
14 January 2017	21:00	Rouen	France	Zénith de Rouen	Laurent Maistret & Marie Denigot	Alizée, Priscilla Betti, Laurent Maistret, Florent Mothe & Sylvie Tellier
20 January 2017	20:30	Amnéville	France	Le Galaxie	Laurent Maistret & Marie Denigot	Alizée, Priscilla Betti, Olivier Dion, Laurent Maistret & Florent Mothe
21 January 2017	16:00	Lille	France	Zénith de Lille	Laurent Maistret & Marie Denigot	Alizée, Olivier Dion, Karine Ferri, Laurent Maistret & Sylvie Tellier
21 January 2017	21:00	Lille	France	Zénith de Lille	Laurent Maistret & Marie Denigot	Alizée, Olivier Dion, Karine Ferri, Laurent Maistret & Sylvie Tellier
22 January 2017	15:00	Lille	France	Zénith de Lille	Olivier Dion & Candice Pascal	Alizée, Olivier Dion, Karine Ferri, Laurent Maistret & Sylvie Tellier
25 January 2017	20:30	Marseille	France	Le Dôme de Marseille	Alizée & Grégoire Lyonnet	Alizée, Valérie Damidot, Olivier Dion, Laurent Maistret & Sylvie Tellier
26 January 2017	20:30	Marseille	France	Le Dôme de Marseille	Olivier Dion & Candice Pascal	Alizée, Priscilla Betti, Valérie Damidot, Olivier Dion & Laurent Maistret
27 January 2017	20:30	Montpellier	France	Zénith Sud	Alizée & Grégoire Lyonnet	Alizée, Priscilla Betti, Valérie Damidot, Olivier Dion & Laurent Maistret
28 January 2017	20:30	Nice	France	Palais Nikaïa	Priscilla Betti & Christophe Licata	Alizée, Priscilla Betti, Valérie Damidot, Olivier Dion & Laurent Maistret
3 February 2017	20:30	Orléans	France	Zénith d'Orléans	Alizée & Grégoire Lyonnet	Alizée, Priscilla Betti, Karine Ferri, Camille Lou (Note: Did not participate the competition.) & Laurent Maistret
4 February 2017	20:55 (Note: A special show that will be broadcast live on TF1 television channel.)	Clermont-Ferrand	France	Zénith d'Auvergne	Le grand show Loïc Nottet & Denitsa Ikonomova Winning team: Jean-Marc Généreux (Laurent Maistret, Camille Lou & Laurent Ournac)	Alizée, Philippe Candeloro, Karine Ferri, Baptiste Giabiconi, Brian Joubert, Tonya Kinzinger, Camille Lou, Laurent Maistret, Loïc Nottet, Laurent Ournac, Shy'm & Tal
10 February 2017	20:30	Toulouse	France	Zénith de Toulouse	Laurent Maistret & Marie Denigot	Alizée, Philippe Candeloro, (Note: Did not participate the competition.) Tonya Kinzinger, Laurent Maistret & Florent Mothe
11 February 2017	16:00	Bordeaux	France	Patinoire de Mériadeck	Laurent Maistret & Marie Denigot	Alizée, Philippe Candeloro, Tonya Kinzinger, Laurent Maistret & Florent Mothe
11 February 2017	21:00	Bordeaux	France	Patinoire de Mériadeck	Laurent Maistret & Marie Denigot	Alizée, Philippe Candeloro, Tonya Kinzinger, Laurent Maistret & Florent Mothe
17 February 2017	20:30	Paris	France	Zénith de Paris	Laurent Maistret & Marie Denigot	Alizée, Karine Ferri, Tonya Kinzinger, Laurent Maistret, Florent Mothe & Sylvie Tellier
18 February 2017	15:00	Paris	France	Zénith de Paris	Laurent Maistret & Marie Denigot	Alizée, Karine Ferri, Tonya Kinzinger, Laurent Maistret, Florent Mothe & Sylvie Tellier
18 February 2017	20:30	Paris	France	Zénith de Paris	Tonya Kinzinger & Maxime Dereymez	Alizée, Karine Ferri, Tonya Kinzinger, Laurent Maistret, Florent Mothe & Sylvie Tellier
19 February 2017	15:00	Paris	France	Zénith de Paris	Tonya Kinzinger & Maxime Dereymez	Alizée, Karine Ferri, Tonya Kinzinger, Laurent Maistret, Florent Mothe & Sylvie Tellier
24 February 2017	20:30	Lyon	France	Halle Tony Garnier	Alizée & Grégoire Lyonnet	Alizée, Karine Ferri, Laurent Maistret, Florent Mothe & Sylvie Tellier
25 February 2017	15:00	Lyon	France	Halle Tony Garnier	Laurent Maistret & Marie Denigot	Alizée, Karine Ferri, Laurent Maistret, Florent Mothe & Sylvie Tellier
25 February 2017	20:30	Lyon	France	Halle Tony Garnier	Laurent Maistret & Marie Denigot	Alizée, Karine Ferri, Laurent Maistret, Florent Mothe & Sylvie Tellier
3 March 2017	20:30	Strasbourg	France	Zénith de Strasbourg	Alizée & Grégoire Lyonnet	Alizée, Olivier Dion, Tonya Kinzinger, Laurent Maistret & Florent Mothe
4 March 2017	16:00	Dijon	France	Zénith de Dijon	Laurent Maistret & Marie Denigot	Alizée, Olivier Dion, Tonya Kinzinger, Laurent Maistret & Florent Mothe
4 March 2017	21:00	Dijon	France	Zénith de Dijon	Alizée & Grégoire Lyonnet	Alizée, Olivier Dion, Tonya Kinzinger, Laurent Maistret & Florent Mothe

=== Dances 2017 ===
Couple	Style	Music
Alizée & Grégoire Lyonnet	Paso Doble	Viva la Vida — Coldplay
Alizée & Grégoire Lyonnet	Contemporary dance	Elastic Heart — Sia
Priscilla Betti & Christophe Licata	Cha cha cha	I Wanna Dance with Somebody (Who Loves Me) — Whitney Houston
Priscilla Betti & Christophe Licata	Rumba	Gorilla – Bruno Mars
Valérie Damidot & Christian Millette	Quickstep	Bewitched theme song
Valérie Damidot & Christian Millette	Waltz	I Have Nothing – Whitney Houston
Olivier Dion & Candice Pascal	Paso Doble	Iron — Woodkid
Olivier Dion & Candice Pascal	Contemporary dance	Gravity — Sara Bareilles
Karine Ferri & Yann-Alrick Mortreuil	Rumba	Les yeux de la mama — Kendji Girac
Karine Ferri & Yann-Alrick Mortreuil	Waltz	Ti amo — Umberto Tozzi
Laurent Maistret & Marie Denigot	Contemporary dance	Papaoutai – Stromae
Laurent Maistret & Marie Denigot	Cha cha cha	Can You Feel It – The Jackson 5
Florent Mothe & Candice Pascal	American Smooth	Writing's on the Wall – Sam Smith
Florent Mothe & Candice Pascal	Contemporary dance	U-Turn (Lili) — AaRON
Sylvie Tellier & Christophe Licata	Tango	Can't Feel My Face — The Weeknd
Sylvie Tellier & Christophe Licata	Cha cha cha	Let's Get Loud — Jennifer Lopez
