= Le grand show =

- Promotional screenshot of Danse avec les stars : Le grand show
- Celebrity winner: Loïc Nottet
- Professional winner: Denitsa Ikonomova
- No. of episodes: 1

Release
- Original network: TF1
- Original release: February 4, 2017

Season chronology
- ← Previous; 7 Next → 8

Danse avec les stars: Le grand show was a special episode of the French version of Strictly Come Dancing, broadcast live from Danse avec les stars - La tournée dancing tour. The episode was broadcast prime time on TF1 channel on 4 February 2017, roughly in the middle of the tour in 2017. The show was held at Zénith d'Auvergne in Clermont Ferrand.

The special show was announced after the tour had already begun, and it caused the show to be rescheduled to start 25 minutes later than originally announced to fit TF1's schedule. The show also differs from all the other shows during the tour: it had the original season 7 judges, 12 competing celebrities and the competitors competed in teams of three, with each team having different judge as their coach.

The episode had the lowest viewership out of the 62 episodes broadcast in history of Danse avec les stars. 2 980 000 viewers with 15,4 % share of the viewership on French television channels, when normally the show has roughly five million viewers with 24% share of all the viewers.

== Participants ==
Total of 12 celebrities from five different seasons joined the show.

Season 2
Philippe Candeloro (with Candice Pascal)	Baptiste Giabiconi (with Candice Pascal)	Shy'm (with Maxime Dereymez)

Season 4
Alizée (with Gregoire Lyonnet)	Laurent Ournac (with Denitsa Ikonomova)	Tal (with Yann-Alrick Mortreuil)

Season 5
Brian Joubert (with Katrina Patchett & Silvia Notargiacomo)	Tonya Kinzinger (with Maxime Dereymez)

Season 6
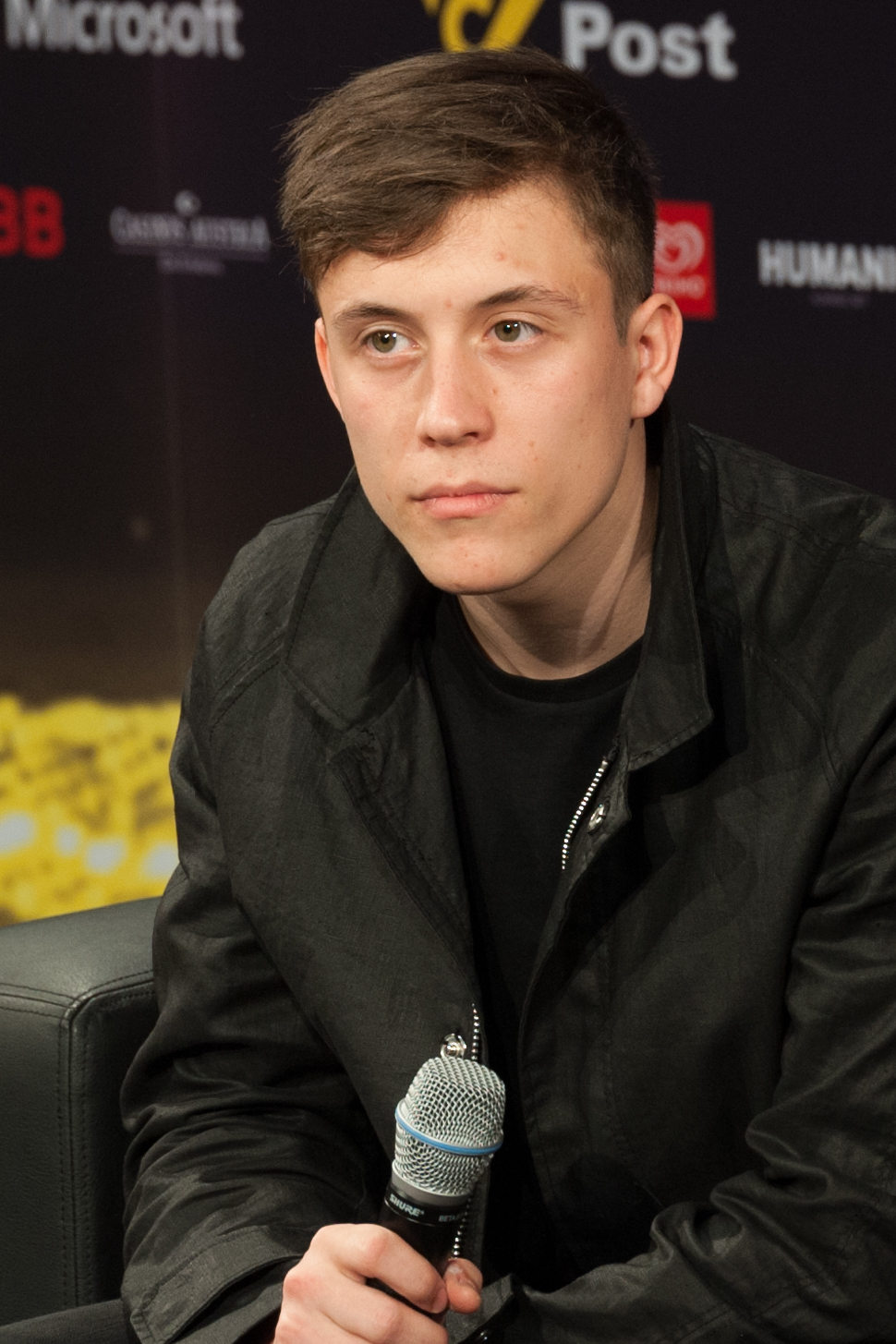
Loïc Nottet
(with Denitsa Ikonomova)

Season 7
Camille Lou (with Gregoire Lyonnet)	Karine Ferri (with Yann-Alrick Mortreuil)	Laurent Maistret (with Denitsa Ikonomova)

== Scores ==
=== Couples ===
Each dance was scored by three judges (the coach of the competitor was excluded from the voting) and by one vote from public. Maximum score was 40 points.

Rank	Celebrity	Dance order	Professional partner	Coach	Dance style	Music	Scores		
Rank	Celebrity	Dance order	Professional partner	Coach	Dance style	Music	Judges	Audience	Total
1	Loïc Nottet	5	Denitsa Ikonomova	Marie-Claude Pietragalla	Contemporary dance	Chandelier - Sia	30 (10,10,10)	10	40
2	Alizée	2	Grégoire Lyonnet	Chris Marques	Contemporary dance / Bollywood	One - U2 / Jai Ho - The Pussycat Dolls	30 (10,10,10)	9	39
3	Tonya Kinzinger	11	Maxime Dereymez	Chris Marques	Jazz	Show Me How You Burlesque - Christina Aguilera	28 (10,9,9)	9	37
3	Laurent Maistret	3	Denitsa Ikonomova	Jean-Marc Généreux	Jive / Cha cha cha	Can't Hold Us - Macklemore & Ryan Lewis / Uptown Funk - Mark Ronson & Bruno Mars	28 (10,9,9)	9	37
3	Laurent Ournac	12	Denitsa Ikonomova	Jean-Marc Généreux	Quickstep	It's Not Unusual - Tom Jones	28 (10,8,10)	9	37
6	Camille Lou	6	Grégoire Lyonnet	Jean-Marc Généreux	Jive	Wake Me Up Before You Go-Go - Wham!	26 (9,9,8)	9	35
7	Shy'm	1	Maxime Dereymez	Fauve Hautot	Jazz / Rumba	The Muppet Show theme song / You Can Leave Your Hat On - Joe Cocker	27 (9,9,9)	8	35
8	Tal	4	Yann-Alrick Mortreuil	Marie-Claude Pietragalla	Boogie-woogie	Ça (c'est vraiment toi) - Téléphone	26 (9,8,9)	8	34
9	Karine Ferri	9	Yann-Alrick Mortreuil	Fauve Hautot	Rumba	Les yeux de la Mama - Kendji Girac	24 (8,8,8)	9	33
9	Brian Joubert	10	Katrina Patchett & Silvia Notargiacomo	Marie-Claude Pietragalla	Samba	Gasolina - Daddy Yankee	24 (8,8,8)	9	33
11	Baptiste Giabiconi	7	Candice Pascal	Fauve Hautot	Tango	Can't Feel My Face - The Weeknd	23 (7,8,8)	8	31
12	Philippe Candeloro	8	Candice Pascal	Chris Marques	Samba	Wonder Woman theme song	21 (7,6,8)	7	28

=== Teams ===
For team scores each couple's individual scores were added together. Maximum for a team was 120 points.

Rank	Coach	Celebrity	Professional partner	Scores	
Rank	Coach	Celebrity	Professional partner	Couple	Total
1	Jean-Marc Généreux	Camille Lou	Grégoire Lyonnet	35	109
1	Jean-Marc Généreux	Laurent Maistret	Denitsa Ikonomova	37	109
1	Jean-Marc Généreux	Laurent Ournac	Denitsa Ikonomova	37	109
2	Marie-Claude Pietragalla	Brian Joubert	Katrina Patchett & Silvia Notargiacomo	33	107
2	Marie-Claude Pietragalla	Loïc Nottet	Denitsa Ikonomova	40	107
2	Marie-Claude Pietragalla	Tal	Yann-Alrick Mortreuil	34	107
3	Chris Marques	Alizée	Grégoire Lyonnet	39	104
3	Chris Marques	Philippe Candeloro	Candice Pascal	28	104
3	Chris Marques	Tonya Kinzinger	Maxime Dereymez	37	104
4	Fauve Hautot	Karine Ferri	Yann-Alrick Mortreuil	33	99
4	Fauve Hautot	Baptiste Giabiconi	Candice Pascal	31	99
4	Fauve Hautot	Shy'm	Maxime Dereymez	35	99
