= Laëtitia Milot =

French actress

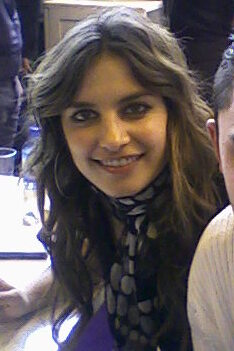
- Milot at the "Salon du livre" in 2010
- Born: 5 July 1980 (age 45); Limoges, France
- Occupations: Actress, Singer, Author
- Years active: 2000–present
- Spouse: Badri Menaia (m. 2007)
- Children: 1

Laëtitia Milot (born 5 July 1980) is a French actress, singer and author.

== Filmography ==
Year	Title	Role	Director	Notes
2000	Toute la ville en parle		Marc Rivière	TV Movie
2002	Opération séduction aux Caraïbes	Camille	Emmanuel Maquaire	TV Series (1 Episode)
2003	Une femme d'honneur	The Seller	Christiane Lehérissey	TV Series (1 Episode)
2004–2018	Plus belle la vie	Mélanie Rinato	Several	TV Series (1112 Episodes)
2010	S.O.S. 18	Cora	Jean Sagols	TV Series (3 Episodes)
2011	Course contre la montre	Mélanie	Roger Wielgus	TV Movie
2012	Enquêtes réservées	Corinne Medri	Laurent Carcélès	TV Series (1 Episode)
2013	Nos chers voisins	Constance	Emmanuel Rigaut	TV Series (1 Episode)
2014	Camping paradis	Laëtitia	Philippe Proteau	TV Series (1 Episode)
2015	On se retrouvera	Margot	Joyce Buñuel	TV Movie
2016	Meurtres à Avignon	Julie Ravel	Stéphane Kappes	TV Movie
2016	La Femme aux cheveux rouges	Constance Lacassan	Thierry Peythieu	TV Movie
2016-2017	La vengeance aux yeux clairs	Olivia Alessandri	David Morlet & Nicolas Guicheteau	TV Series (14 Episodes)
2017	Quand je serai grande... Je te tuerai	Jeanne Guerin	Jean-Christophe Delpias	TV Mini-Series
2018	Un Bébé pour Noël	Noémie	Eric Summer	TV Movie
2018	Coup de Foudre à Bora-Bora	Valentine	David Morlet	TV Movie
2020	Olivia	Olivia	Thierry Binisti & Octave Raspail	TV Mini-Series; Filming
2020	Réunion	Chloé	Laurent Dussaux	TV Series; Filming

== Discography ==
Year	Singles
2019	Loin d'ici and Vincent Niclo

== Theater ==
Year	Title
2002	A Midsummer Night's Dream
2008	À la manière d'eux
2010	Désir et Comédie
2010-11	The Baker's Wife

== Clip ==
Year	Song	Singer
2002	Au soleil	Jenifer
2002	Je veux t'appartenir	Romain Cabon
2004	Menina Bonita	La Harissa
2004	Elle habite ici	Gérald de Palmas

== Author ==
Year	Book	Publishing	Notes
2010	Je voulais te dire	Éditions Florent-Massot	Novel
2013	On se retrouvera	Fayard	Novel

== Advertising ==
Year	Notes
2009	Le Petit Olivier
2009	LPB
2011	Rexona Women

== Other ==
In 2013, she was one of the contestants during the fourth season of Danse avec les stars. She finished in third place.
