= Patinoire de Mériadeck =

Sports complex in Bordeaux, France

Coordinates: 44.8368°N 0.5860°W

- Interactive map of Patinoire de Mériadeck
- Full name: Patinoire Axel Vega
- Address: 95 Cours du Maréchal Juin
- Location: Bordeaux
- Operator: Groupe Récréa (via SBSL Axel Vega)
- Capacity: 3,312 (all-seater, ice hockey)
- Executive suites: 7 salons
- Surface: 12,560 m^{2} (135,200 sq ft)
- Field size: 60 × 30 metre
- Public transit: Hôtel de police

Construction
- Groundbreaking: November 1979
- Built: 1979–1981
- Opened: December 18, 1981 (public opening); January 7, 1982 (inauguration ceremony)
- Expanded: 2004
- Cost: FF 72–77 millions
- Architects: Claude Henri Aubert (1981 original); Bertrand Nivelle (2004 extension)

Tenants
- Boxers de Bordeaux (Ligue Magnus) (1998–present)

Patinoire Axel Vega, commonly known as Patinoire de Mériadeck (English: Mériadeck Ice Rink) after the eponymous Mériadeck quarter, is a multi-purpose arena located in Bordeaux, Gironde, France. Today primarily used as an ice rink, it is the home of professional ice hockey team Boxers de Bordeaux. Between 1981 and 2017, it doubled as the agglomeration's main concert venue, and hosted many artists of national and international stature.

== History ==
=== Design and building ===
Patinoire de Mériadeck replaced a smaller, community-style rink called Le Skating and located on Place des Quinconces. It was part of a large urban renewal project for the eponymous Mériadeck business district. Its design was authored by architect Claude-Henri Aubert, who was also in charge of urban planning for the entire Aquitaine Coast region, and was unveiled to the general public in October 1979. Culminating at 27 meter above ground, it is an amalgamation of truncated pyramidal volumes, covered by a roof made of a copper tiles. The building's steel armature alone weighs 500 tons. Its style foreshadows that of the Palais Omnisports de Paris-Bercy, built two years later, and it has been referred to as a "little Bercy".

Construction began in November 1979 through a consortium of some thirty, mostly local companies. The building was delivered on October 28, 1981. It officially opened to the public on December 18, 1981. Its cost was evaluated between FF 72 million and FF 77 million. It was originally planned to be connected to a neighboring library by a shopping arcade, but the library was delayed until 1991 and the shopping arcade was abandoned during that time.

The rink has received a number of refurbishments over the years, but the most significant was a 2004 extension and remodel overseen by local architect Bertrand Nivelle, at a cost of €5.3 million. The entrance hall was enlarged and outfitted with additional staircases, while skylights were added to the original roof above it. On the opposite side, an extension—which was given a copper look like the roof—was built, which featured a catering area and new backstage space for the artists. During the renovation, the resident clubs moved to a bare-bones temporary rink located in the northern Lake quarter, near the Stadium Vélodrome and the location of the future Nouveau Stade de Bordeaux.

=== Management ===
The building's management contract originally went to France Patinoire, a company chaired by Thierry Lacarrière, son of IIHF Hall of Famer Jacques Lacarrière, and later to a successor entity called Bordeaux Gestion Equipement, also headed by Lacarrière. BGE's accounting was called into question and in 1997, management rights to the rink and other public establishments were transferred to a new outfit called Société Bordelaise de Sports et Loisirs (SBSL), which took the commercial name Axel Vega due to being a subsidiary of nationwide operator Vega. Vega was absorbed by FIMALAC in 2010 and later phased out, but the legacy branding "Axel Vega" has been retained for the Bordeaux facilities.

== Ice rink ==
Patinoire de Mériadeck features a single Olympic-size ice pad, as well as four locker rooms. In addition to the Boxers professional hockey team, it also houses Bordeaux Sports de Glace 33, which oversees ice dancing and ballet on ice activities. In 1996, the building played home to Group K of the IIHF European Cup as the nominal hosts, French champions Albatros de Brest, moved the round robin tournament there due to their small rink not meeting continental competition standards.

During the summer of 2013, the ice pad was completely redone. In 2017, the arena's concert activities—which often conflicted with the Boxers' schedule—were transferred to a new, suburban arena. With the emphasis now placed on sports, three halls were redesigned and added to the arena's corporate hospitality offerings, filling a need of the Boxers who had maxed out Meriadeck's club seating several years prior while still in the second tier. A suspended video cube with a mounted camera was also installed. During the 2022–23 season, the city of Bordeaux re-allocated the bar concessions to the Boxers, providing the team with an additional revenue stream.

== Stage configuration ==
Patinoire Mériadeck was the only French ice rink to function as a multi-propose arena for an extended length of time, as mixed-use sports and entertainment facilities are not the norm in the country, particularly when ice is a factor. The modular stage had a surface of 400 m^{2} (4,300 sq ft). The ice pad was covered by an insulated carpet, helping to keep the temperature at 9 °C about 20 centimeters above the ice. In stage configuration, maximum capacity was 7,212 for standing room shows, and around 5,200 when the floor was used for seating. An additional stand could be deployed across one end of the playing surface.

During the 2004 renovation, the backstage area was beefed up with new storage rooms and extra dressing rooms for the artists, as they often had to resort to using the rink's locker rooms. The ground floor had a production office and one dressing room, while the expanded first floor received another six. The main hall was equipped with a new retractable stage, and the ceiling was overhauled improve its acoustics, which had been a persistent source of criticism. In 2017, with the opening of Bordeaux Métropole Arena in suburban Floirac, the ice rink stopped hosting concerts. The last such event was a showing of the popular musical Notre-Dame de Paris. However, it will continue to be rented out for one-off corporate events, which typically require lighter logistics and are not expected to interfere with the life of residents clubs as much as concerts did.

== Notable events ==
=== Sports ===
- ISU Grand Prix of Figure Skating – Trophée de France (1995, 2014, 2015)
- French Figure Skating Championships (1983, 1995)
- French Ice Dancing Championships (1990, 1992, 1997)
- Ligue Magnus All-Star Game (2018)
- Ballet on Ice Gold Cup/Nations Cup (2024)

=== Politics ===
- Allocution of President François Mitterrand – Congrès de la Mutualité (1982)

=== Featured entertainers ===
- A-ha
- Charles Aznavour
- Chuck Berry
- Bon Jovi
- James Brown
- The Cranberries
- Ray Charles
- Bob Dylan
- Cirque du Soleil
- Deep Purple
- Céline Dion
- The Cure
- Elton John
- Dancing with the Stars France
- Depeche Mode
- Dire Straits
- Patrick Dupond
- Earth, Wind and Fire
- Flashdance: The Musical
- Genesis
- Ice Age Live! A Mammoth Adventure
- INXS
- Jean-Michel Jarre
- Korn
- Lenny Kravitz
- Michael Flatley's Lord of the Dance
- Mamma Mia!
- Moby
- Muse
- Jimmy Page & Robert Plant
- Mike Oldfield
- Radiohead
- Red Hot Chili Peppers
- André Rieu
- Scorpions
- Simple Minds
- Supertramp
- Sting
- Tina Turner
- Toto
- U2
- Disney's Violetta Live
- The Voice France
- Hans Zimmer
- ZZ Top

== External ==
- Patinoire Mériadeck at Bordeaux Meeting & Congress
- Patinoire Bordeaux Mériadeck at axelvega.com (in French)
