= Marina Kaye =

French singer (born 1998)

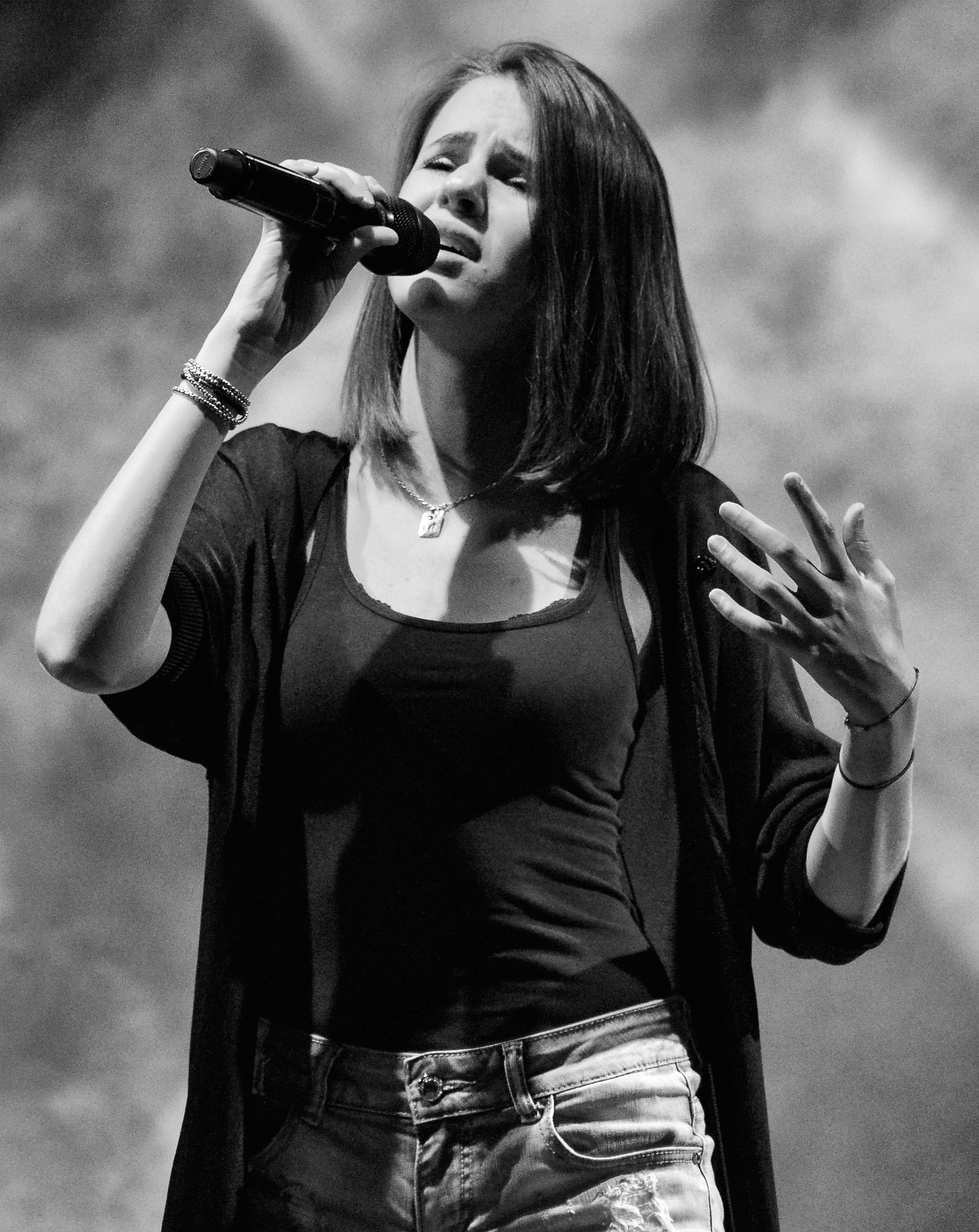
- Marina Kaye performing in 2017

Background information
- Born: Marina Marie Madeleine Dalmas; 9 February 1998 (age 28); Marseille, France
- Genres: Pop rock
- Occupations: Singer-songwriter, composer
- Years active: 2011–present
- Labels: Capitol Music (2014–2019); PIAS Group (2019)
- Website: www.marinakaye.com

Marina Marie Madeleine Dalmas (French pronunciation: [maʁina maʁi madlɛn dalmas]; born 9 February 1998), better known as Marina Kaye, is a French singer, songwriter and composer from Marseille.

Most famous for the hit "Homeless", she has released the EP Homeless in 2014 and the album Fearless in 2015. On October 20, 2017, she released her second album, Explicit, which was certified gold.

== Life and career ==
=== Childhood and France's Got Incredible Talent (1998–2011) ===
Marina Marie Madeleine Dalmas was born in the 9th district of Marseille to a French father and a stay-at-home mother of Algerian-Kabyle origin, but grew up in the town of Allauch. She studied at Yves-Montand college until the age of 15, when she dropped out to relocate to London to work on her album in London.

She started posting videos of covers on her YouTube channel at the age of ten.

On 14 December 2011, at the age of 13, she won the sixth season of La France a un incroyable talent, the French version of the Got Talent series. She sang Rolling in the Deep and Set Fire to the Rain from Adele and Firework from Katy Perry.

After her victory, she decided to stop singing due to her classmates and some adults in her school. It was her meeting with Jan Erik Frogg that made her change her mind.

In 2012, she opened for the French musical comedy Adam et Ève: La Seconde Chance (mis en scène by Pascal Obispo). She also released a number of covers online and opened for Thirty Seconds to Mars at Palais des Festivals de Cannes and for Florent Pagny tour Vieillir Ensemble and in 2014 for five of Lindsey Stirling's concerts in France.

=== First album: Fearless (2015) ===
She gained significant recognition with "Homeless" taken from her similarly titled EP Homeless. The single topped the SNEP French official singles chart.

On 18 May 2015, she released the album Fearless recorded in London and New York City which includes the song "Freeze You Out" written by Sia and Chris Braide. The album went triple platinum in France.

=== Explicit (2017) ===
In January, she played in Papounet, a French comedy directed by Dominique Farrugia.

On September 14, rapper and singer Soprano announced the tracklist for his album L'Everest which will be released the following month, with the song "Mon Everest" featuring Marina.

On October 20, she released Explicit, her second album shortly after releasing the official clip for "On My Own" and "Something".

=== Twisted (2020) ===
On 18 September 2019, she released the song "Twisted", from the upcoming album with the same name.

She released 3 more singles in 2020: "The Whole 9" on January 31, "Double Life" on September 2 and "7 Billion" on September 23.

On October 6, she announced via Twitter that the album would be released on November 6.

== Personal life ==
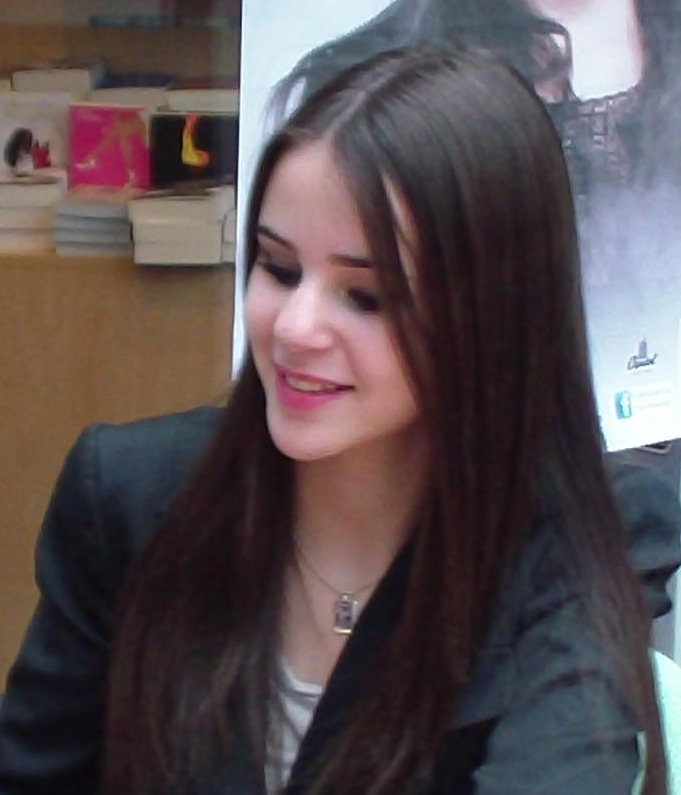
Marina Kaye in 2015

She participates in the album Balavoine (s), released in January 2016 for the thirtieth anniversary of the death of Daniel Balavoine, using the title Only the very best. She performed at the South by Southwest festival in Texas in March 2016. She will also do a duet with rapper Soprano on the title Mon Everest. On January 7, 2017, she sang for the first time in French on television, taking over the title Vole by Céline Dion on TF1, in homage to Grégory Lemarchal (Grégory Lemarchal, 10 years after the story continues). A few months later, on October 20, 2017, she released a second album, Explicit. This becomes a gold disc.

She had a well-publicized feud with her father after he said on his own Facebook that his daughter was under immense psychological pressure and isolated from the realities of the world. He also blamed her for changing her name as an attempt to cut herself from her roots. She retorted that she was shocked and hurt by these declarations and said this was a continuation of what she described as a "traumatic childhood" in her youth, adding that her own father just wanted to destroy her career, to which Dalmas responded, "What father would like to destroy his children and their future?"

As of October 2020, Marina lives in Geneva, Switzerland.

== Discography ==
=== Albums ===
Title	Details	Peak chart positions				Certifications	Sales
Title	Details	FRA	BEL (Fl)	BEL (Wa)	SWI	Certifications	Sales
Fearless	Released: 18 May 2015; Format: Digital download, CD; Label: Capitol Records, Universal	3	118	8	20	FRA : 3× Platinum	FRA : 300,000
Explicit	Released: 20 October 2017; Format: Digital download, CD; Label: Capitol Records, Universal	14	—	26	22	FRA : Gold	FRA : 50,000
Twisted	Released: 6 November 2020; Format: Digital download, streaming; Label: PIAS Recordings	50	—	57	—		
"—" denotes a release that did not chart or was not released in that territory.

=== Extended plays ===
Title	Details
Homeless	Released: 16 June 2014; Format: Digital download, CD; Label: Capitol Records

=== Singles ===
==== As lead artist ====
Title	Year	Peak chart positions				Certifications	Album
Title	Year	FRA	BEL (Fl)	BEL (Wa)	SWI	Certifications	Album
"Homeless" (Note: "Homeless" also features on Marina Kaye's EP Homeless.)	2014	1	14	1	25	FRA: Platinum; BEL: Gold	Fearless
"Dancing with the Devil"	2015	49	—	56	—		Fearless
"Mirror Mirror"	2015	—	—	—	—		Fearless
"Only the Very Best"	2016	43	—	—	—		Balavoine(s)
"Freeze You Out"	2016	69	—	86	—		Fearless
"The World Belongs to Us"	2016	—	—	—	—		Robinson Crusoe
"On My Own"	2017	51	—	—	—		Explicit
"Something"	2017	73	—	97	—		Explicit
"Twisted"	2019	110	—	—	—		Twisted
"The Whole 9"	2020	15	—	83	—		Twisted
"Double Life"	2020	—	—	—	—		Twisted
"—" denotes a release that did not chart or was not released in that territory.

==== As featured artist ====
Title	Year	Peak chart positions		Certifications	Album
Title	Year	FRA	BEL (Wa)	Certifications	Album
"Mon Everest" (Soprano featuring Marina Kaye)	2016	11	32	FRA: Platinum	L'Everest

==== Promotional singles ====
Title	Year	Peak chart positions	Album
Title	Year	FRA	Album
"Sounds Like Heaven" (featuring Lindsey Stirling)	2015	134	Fearless
"7 Billion"	2020	—	Twisted

=== Other charting songs ===
Title	Year	Peak chart positions	Album
Title	Year	FRA	Album
"Live Before I Die"	2015	185	Fearless

== Filmography ==
- 2017: Papounet
