= Brahim Zaibat =

French dancer and choreographer

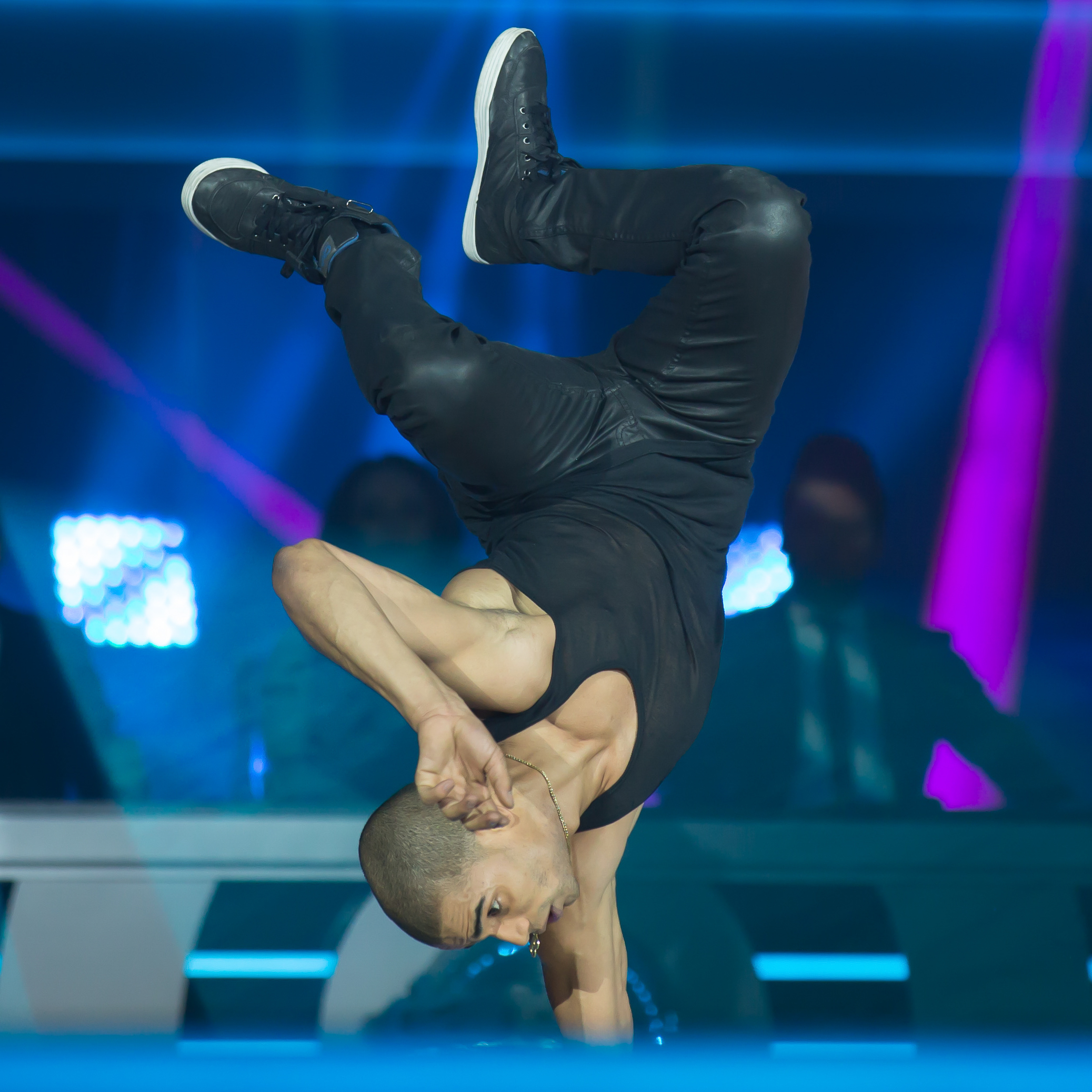
- Zaibat at the Danse avec les stars Tour in 2014
- Born: 9 September 1986 (age 38); Lyon, Auvergne-Rhône-Alpes, France
- Partner: Madonna (2010–2013)

Brahim Zaibat (born 9 September 1986 in Lyon) is a French dancer and choreographer of Algerian origin.

== Biography ==
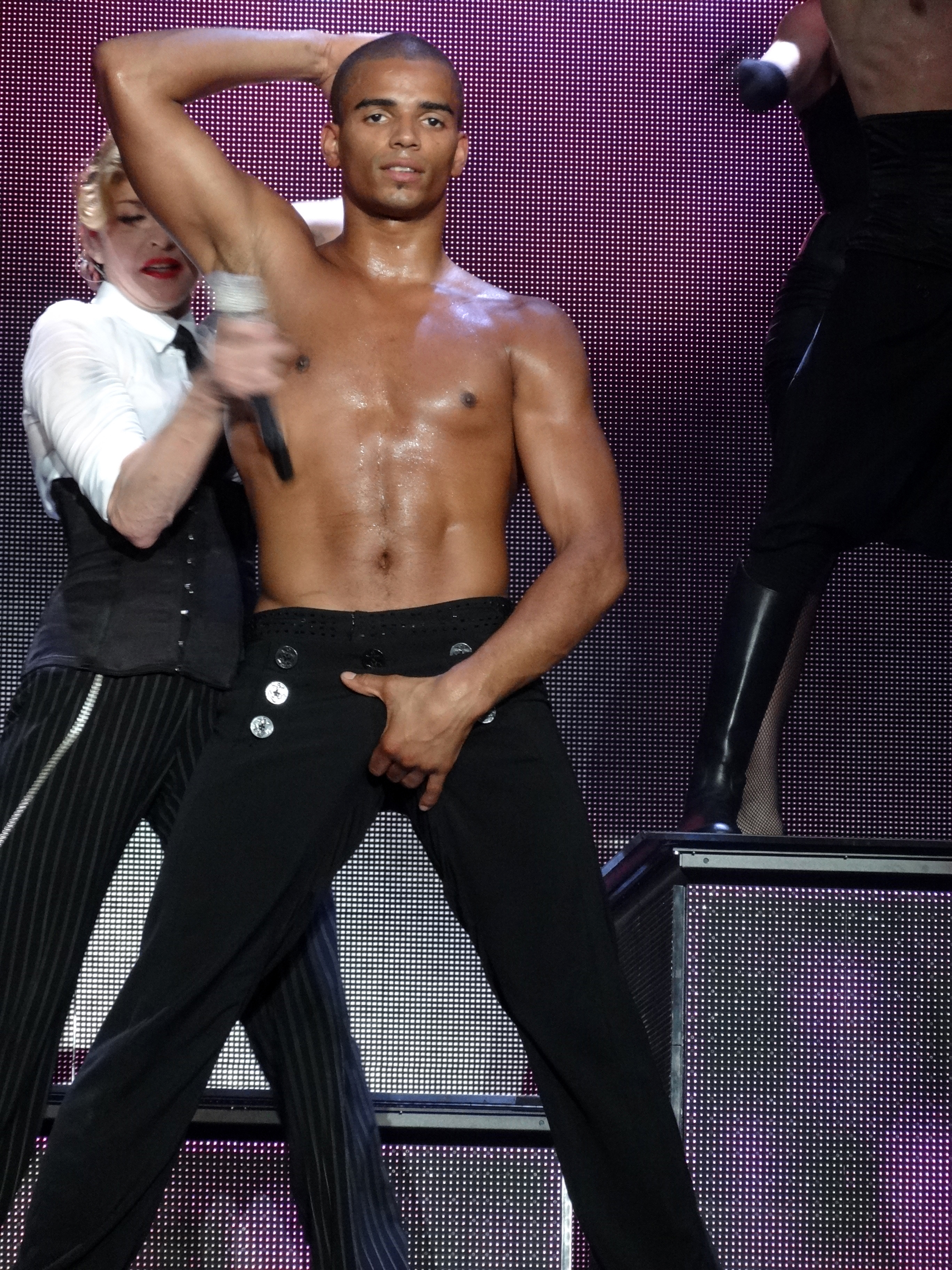
Zaibat during Madonna's concert at Nice in 2012.

Brahim Zaibat start in a hip-hop band called Baby Boom Crew. In 2001, he is part of the Pockemon Crew.

In 2005, he joined as a dancer, the TV show and the tour Star Academy, choreographed by Kamel Ouali.

He left Pockemon Crew in 2008 to dance alongside the Germans, Flying Steps during the Game convection.

In 2012, he danced alongside Madonna during the halftime of Super Bowl XLVI in Indianapolis. That year, he also participates to The MDNA Tour.

In 2013, he became the artistic consultant for the musical Robin Hood. He participated to the TV Show Danse avec les stars 4 on TF1; he came 2nd in the competition with his dance partner, Katrina Patchett.

Since January 2014, he began the tour of Danse avec les stars.

He announced on 31 January 2014 the launch of his show Rock it All, on tour throughout France from late October to early December 2014. His show is a success, with a very positive response from the public and the press. The tour include 23 performances throughout France and Belgium, including three shows at the Casino de Paris displaying complete. This show is nominated to the Prix de la Création musicale 2015 for the Original creation for a show.

In 2015, he participated in a new musical interpretation of The Three Musketeers, in which he played the leading role of Athos, and was also part of the artistic direction of the show.

== Awards ==
In 2003 he won his first title of world champion at the Battle of the Year. In 2004, he won two league titles in Europe, one in 8 against 8 and the other in duet. In 2005, he won in duet with B-boy Lilou, the Freestyle Session in Seoul. In 2006, he won the UK B-Boy Championships with his crew. A year later, he won, again with his crew, the world championship KB BBOY. In 2010, he won his last title of world champion in Japan.

== Personal life ==
Brahim was in a relationship with Madonna. They met when Madonna asked him to dance for promoting her clothing line Material Girl Collection presented at Macy's in New York in September 2010. The couple broke up in December 2013.

On 12 December 2015, on the eve of the second round of regional elections where the National Front had won the first round, he published a selfie taken two years earlier with Jean-Marie Le Pen, without his consent, then sleeping in an aircraft on a flight between Nice and Paris. The tweet bears the legend "Put them all K.O. going vote tomorrow. To preserve our fraternal France !!! ". He was sentenced in February 2016 at a euro provision.
