= Danse avec les stars season 4 =

Danse avec les stars
- Season 4
- Promotional advertisement for the 4th season of Danse avec les Stars; L to R: Titoff, Laury Thilleman, Brahim Zaibat, Tal, Laurent Ournac, Lætitia Milot, Keen'V, Noémie Lenoir, Damien Sargue and Alizée
- Celebrity winner: Alizée
- Professional winner: Gregoire Lyonnet
- No. of episodes: 9

Release
- Original network: TF1
- Original release: September 28 – November 23, 2013

Season chronology
- ← Previous; Danse avec les Stars fête Noël Next → Season 5

The fourth season of the French version of Dancing with the Stars premiered on TF1 on September 28, 2013. Like the previous season, 10 celebrities were paired with 10 professional ballroom dancers. Sandrine Quétier and Vincent Cerutti return as the hosts for this season.

The season was won by Alizée and Grégoire Lyonnet.

== Participants ==
The participants of the season were officially announced by TF1 on September 10, 2013 through an online event, though they'd been gradually revealed by various media outlets between April 15 and August 23 and several celebrities had spoken freely of their participation in the press prior to the official reveal.

Celebrity	Notability (known for)	Professional partner	Status
Noémie Lenoir	Model & actress	Christian Millette	Eliminated 1st on 5 October 2013
Damien Sargue	Singer	Candice Pascal	Eliminated 2nd on 19 October 2013
Titoff	Comedian	Silvia Notargiacomo	Eliminated 3rd on 19 October 2013
Laury Thilleman	Miss France 2011 & journalist	Maxime Dereymez	Eliminated 4th on 26 October 2013
Tal	Singer-songwriter	Yann-Alrick Mortreuil	Eliminated 5th on 2 November 2013
Laurent Ournac	Television actor	Denitsa Ikonomova	Eliminated 6th on 9 November 2013
Keen'V	Reggae musician	Fauve Hautot	Eliminated 7th on 16 November 2013
Lætitia Milot	Actress	Christophe Licata; Maxime Dereymez (Week 7); Christian Millette (Week 8)	Third Place on 23 November 2013
Brahim Zaibat	Dancer & choreographer	Katrina Patchett	Second Place on 23 November 2013
Alizée	Singer	Grégoire Lyonnet	Winners on 23 November 2013

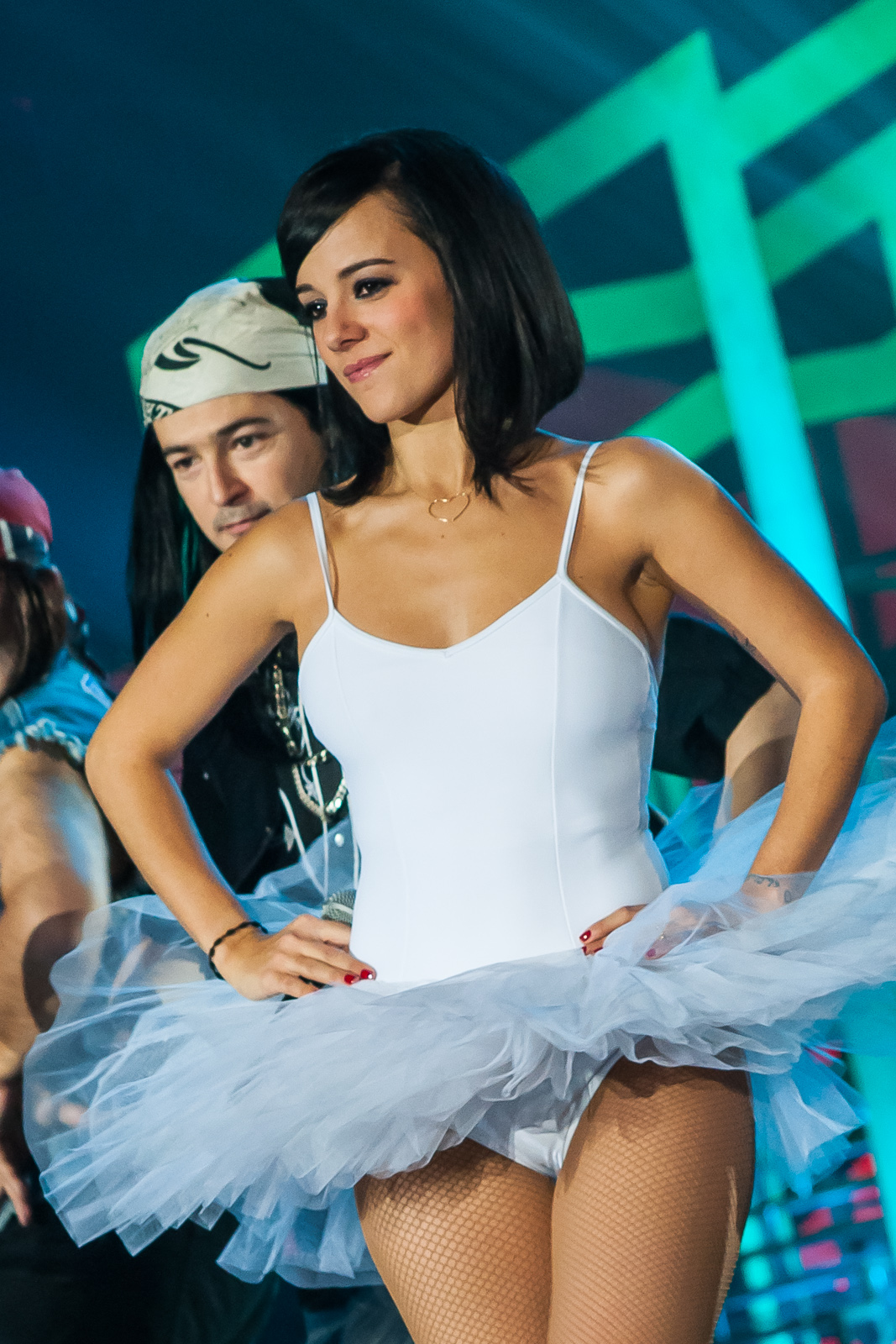
Alizée

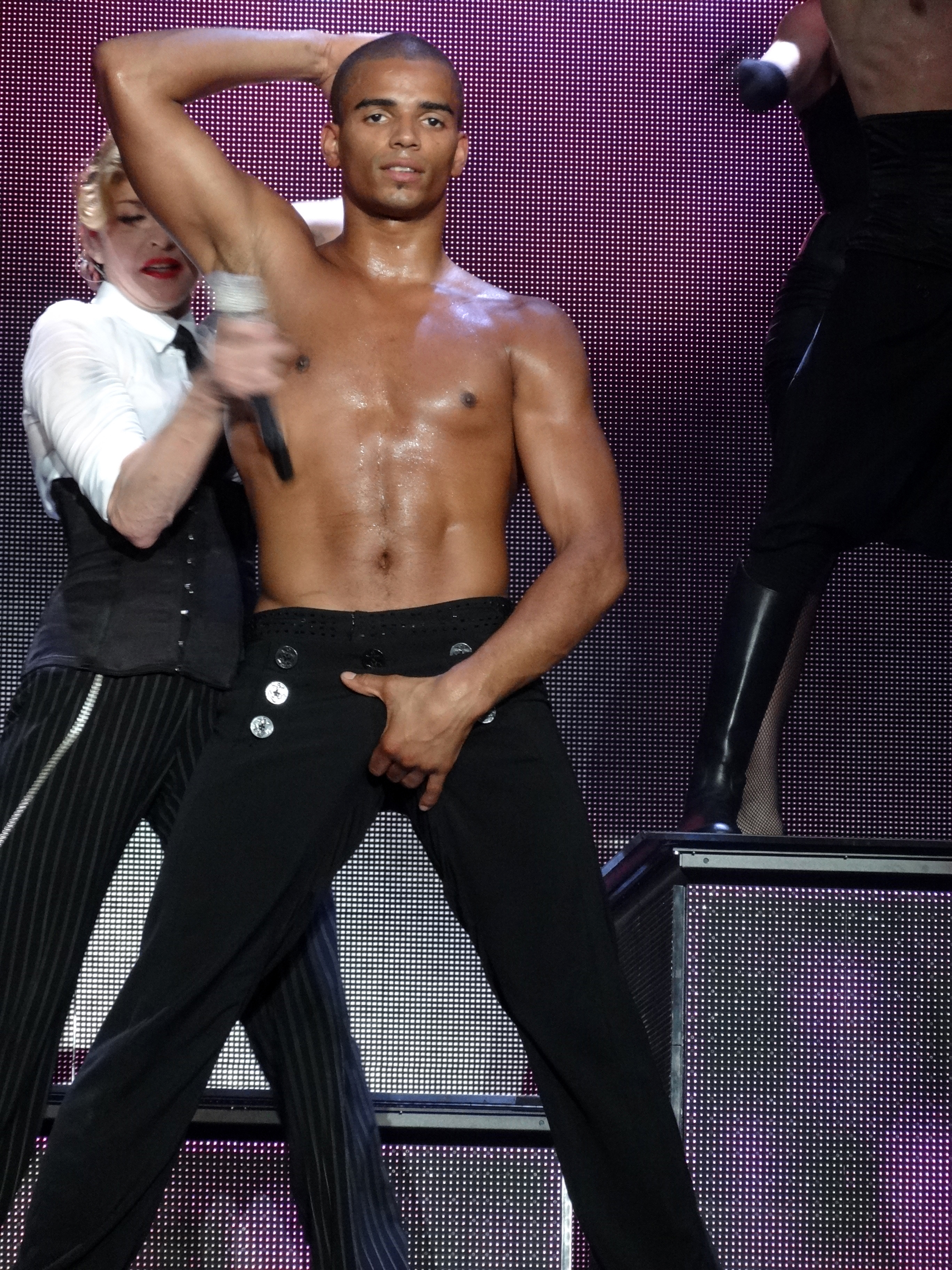
Brahim Zaibat

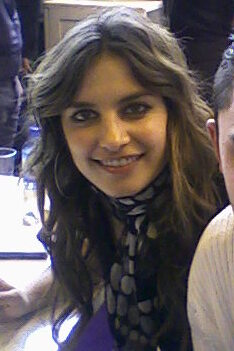
Laëtitia Milot

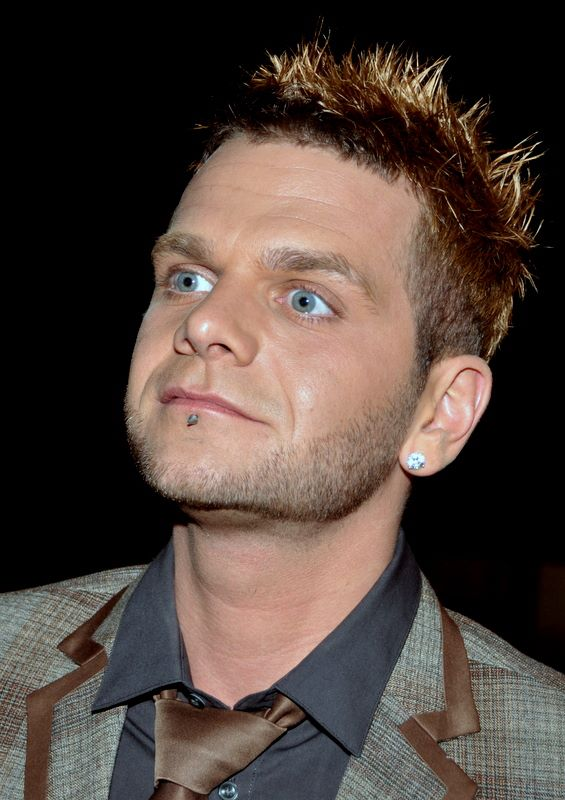
Keen'V

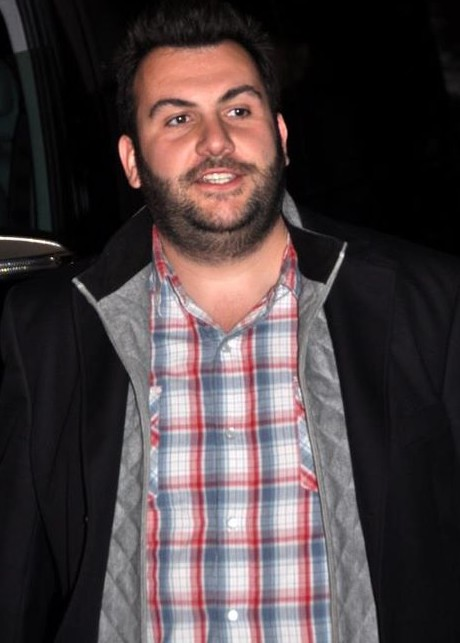
Laurent Ournac

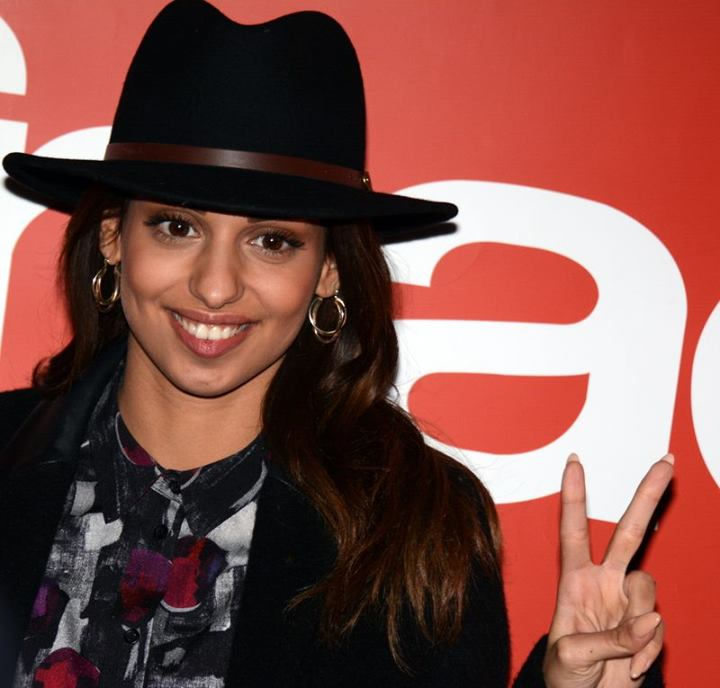
Tal

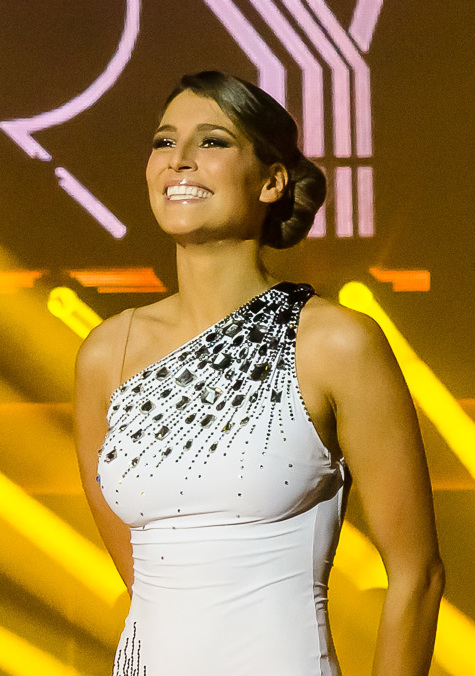
Laury Thilleman

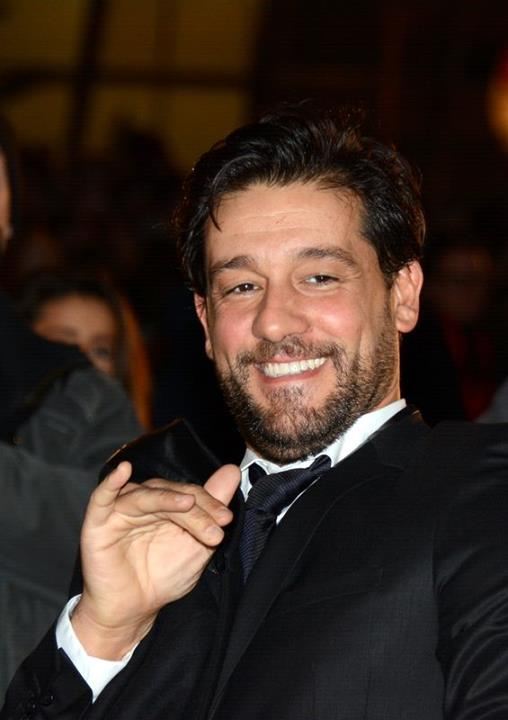
Titoff

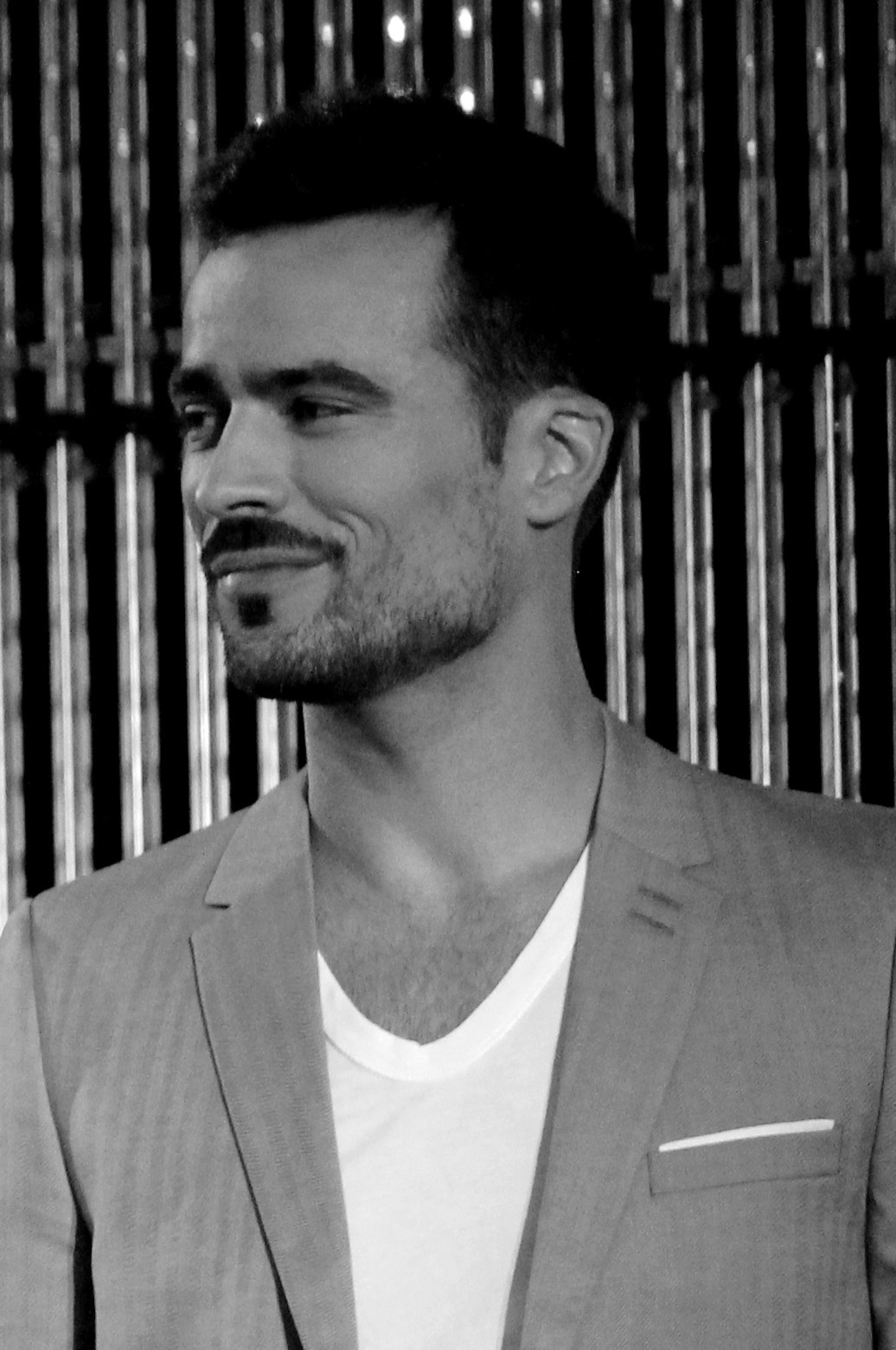
Damien Sargue

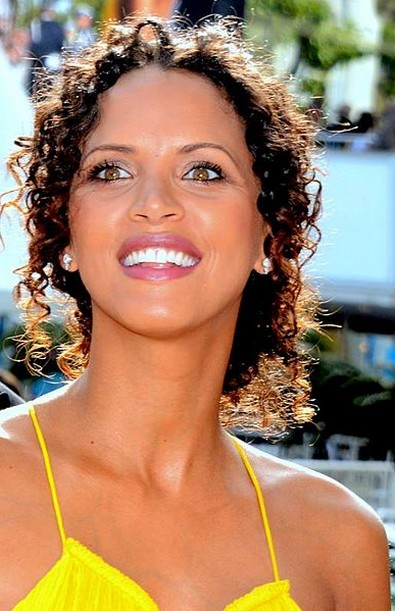
Noémie Lenoir

== Scoring ==
Team	Place	1	2	1+2	3	4	5	6	7	8	9
Alizée & Grégoire	1	35	34	69	69	69	65 + 35 = 100	57 + 70 = 127	69 + 73 = 142	71 + 66 + 40 = 177	68 + 79 + 34 = 181
Brahim & Katrina	2	31	35	66	54	72	74 + 20 = 94	72 + 71 = 143	72 + 76 = 148	68 + 75 + 30 = 173	75 + 76 + 37 = 188
Lætitia & Christophe	3	32	29	61	67	60	62 + 30 = 92	55 + 68 = 123	56 + 58 = 114	60 + 61 + 20 = 141	71 + 63 + 31 = 165
Keen'V & Fauve	4	26	21	47	53	56	56 + 5 = 61	45 + 59 = 104	55 + 53 = 108	61 + 61 + 10 = 132	
Laurent & Denitsa	5	27	25	52	55	61	60 + 15 = 75	50 + 48 = 98	46 + 54 = 100		
Tal & Yann-Alrick	6	25	30	55	66	63	66 + 25 = 91	59 + 57 = 116			
Laury & Maxime	7	28	32	60	57	63	62 + 10 = 72				
Titoff & Silvia	8	30	23	53	63	50					
Damien & Candice	9	33	24	57	55						
Noémie & Christian	10	26	24	50							

Red numbers indicate the couples with the lowest score for each week.
Blue numbers indicate the couples with the highest score for each week.
indicates the couples eliminated that week.
indicates the returning couple that finished in the bottom two.
indicates the winning couple.
indicates the runner-up couple.
indicates the third place couple.

=== Notes of each couples ===
Couple	Total	10	9	8	7	6	5	4	3	2	1	Average
Alizée & Grégoire	100	13	46	33	4	3	1	—N/a				8.6
Brahim & Katrina	100	21	58	14	4	1	2	—N/a				8.9
Laëtitia & Christophe	100	2	16	48	24	7	3	—N/a				7.7
Keen'V & Fauve	80	—N/a	1	20	38	12	5	2	2	—N/a		6.8
Laurent & Denitsa	64	—N/a	2	14	22	15	8	3	—N/a			6.7
Tal & Yann-Alrick	48	—N/a	11	17	12	7	1	—N/a				7.6
Laury & Maxime	32	—N/a	1	17	13	1	—N/a					7.6
Titoff & Silvia	24	—N/a	1	7	9	4	2	1	—N/a			6.9
Damien & Candice	16	—N/a	4	4	2	1	4	1	—N/a			7
Noémie & Christian	8	—N/a			4	3	—N/a	1	—N/a			6.3
Total	572	36	140	174	132	54	26	8	2	0	0	7.7

== Averages ==
This table only counts dances scored on the traditional 40-point scale. Starting from week 3, both technical and artistic scores are tallied.

Rank by average	Place	Couple	Total	Number of dances	Average
1	2	Brahim & Katrina	888	14	35.52
2	1	Alizée & Grégoire	859	14	34.36
3	3	Lætitia & Christophe	773	14	30.92
4	6	Tal & Yann-Alrick	366	7	30.50
5	7	Laury & Maxime	242	5	30.25
6	9	Damien & Candice	112	3	28.00
7	8	Titoff & Silvia	166	4	27.67
8	4	Keen'V & Fauve	546	11	27.30
9	5	Laurent & Denitsa	426	9	26.63
10	10	Noémie & Christian	50	2	25.00

== Highest and lowest scoring performances ==
The best and worst performances in each dance according to the judges' marks are as follows (starting from week 3, an average between technical and artistic score is used):

Dance	Best dancer	Best score	Worst dancer	Worst score
Quickstep	Brahim Zaibat	37.5	Laurent Ournac	27
Contemporary	Brahim Zaibat	36	Tal	25
Cha-Cha-Cha	Brahim Zaibat	36	Keen'V	22.5
Tango	Brahim Zaibat	31	Noémie Lenoir	26
American Smooth	Laury Thilleman	32	Lætitia Milot	28
Rumba	Alizée	39.5	Noémie Lenoir	24
Paso doble	Brahim Zaibat	37	Keen'V	21
Foxtrot	Brahim Zaibat	36	Damien Sargue	24
Bollywood	Alizée	34.5	Alizée	34.5
Flamenco	Alizée	35	Laurent Ournac	27.5
Bolero	Titoff	31.5	Laurent Ournac	24
Modern Jazz	Laury Thilleman	28.5	Laury Thilleman	28.5
Disco	Laëtitia Milot	33.5	Damien Sargue	27.5
Boogie-Woogie	Tal	33	Tal	33
Jazz Broadway	Keen'V	26.5	Keen'V	26.5
Jive	Brahim Zaibat	37	Laurent Ournac	27
Waltz	Lætitia Milot	30.5	Laurent Ournac	23
Samba	Brahim Zaibat	37.5	Laurent Ournac	25
Charleston	Alizée	34.5	Alizée	34.5
Salsa	Keen'V	26.5	Keen'V	26.5

== Couples' highest and lowest scoring performances ==
According to the traditional 40-point scale. (starting from week 3, an average between technical and artistic score is used):

Couples	Highest Scoring Dances	Lowest Scoring Dances
Alizée & Grégoire	Rumba (39.5)	Tango (28.5)
Brahim & Katrina	Rumba (38)	Bolero (27)
Lætitia & Christophe	Foxtrot (35.5)	Contemporary (27.5)
Keen'V & Fauve	Tango; Jive (30.5)	Pasodoble (21)
Laurent & Denitsa	Jive (30.5)	Waltz (23)
Tal & Yann-Alrick	Boogie-Woogie Foxtrot/Contemporary (33)	Contemporary (25)
Laury & Maxime	American Smooth (32)	Cha-Cha-Cha (28)
Titoff & Silvia	Bolero (31.5)	Cha-Cha-Cha (23)
Damien & Candice	Contemporary (33)	Foxtrot (24)
Noémie & Christian	Tango (26)	Rumba (24)

== Styles, scores and songs ==
=== Week 1 ===
Individual judges scores in the chart below (given in parentheses) are listed in this order from left to right:: Marie-Claude Pietragalla, Jean-Marc Généreux, Shy'm, Chris Marques.

Running order

Couple	Score	Style	Music
Laurent & Denitsa	27 (7,7,7,6)	Quickstep	It's Not Unusual - Tom Jones
Tal & Yann-Alrick	25 (6,6,6,7)	Contemporary	Beau malheur - Emmanuel Moire
Laury & Maxime	28 (7,7,7,7)	Cha-Cha-Cha	Get Lucky - Daft Punk feat. Pharrell Williams
Titoff & Silvia	30 (8,8,7,7)	Tango	Perhaps, Perhaps, Perhaps - Doris Day
Lætitia & Christophe	32 (8,8,8,8)	Quickstep	On ira - Zaz
Damien & Candice	33 (9,8,8,8)	Contemporary	Formidable - Stromae
Noémie & Christian	26 (7,6,6,7)	Tango	Dirty Diana - Michael Jackson
Keen'V & Fauve	26 (7,7,7,5)	Contemporary	Sorry Seems to Be the Hardest Word - Elton John
Alizée & Grégoire	35 (9,9,9,8)	Cha-Cha-Cha	Quand la musique est bonne - Amel Bent & Soprano
Brahim & Katrina	31 (7,7,9,8)	Tango	Locked Out of Heaven - Bruno Mars

=== Week 2: Personal Story Week ===
Individual judges scores in the chart below (given in parentheses) are listed in this order from left to right:: Marie-Claude Pietragalla, Jean-Marc Généreux, Shy'm, Chris Marques.

Running order

Couple	Score		Style	Music	Result
Couple	Week 2	Week 1+2	Style	Music	Result
Lætitia & Christophe	29 (8,8,7,6)	61	American Smooth	Écris l'histoire - Grégory Lemarchal	Safe
Laurent & Denitsa	25 (7,7,6,5)	52	Rumba	Et un jour, une femme - Florent Pagny	Safe
Brahim & Katrina	35 (8,9,9,9)	66	Contemporary	Papaoutai - Stromae	Safe
Laury & Maxime	32 (8,8,8,8)	60	American Smooth	What a Wonderful World - Celine Dion	Safe
Tal & Yann-Alrick	30 (8,8,7,7)	55	Paso Doble	Run the World (Girls) - Beyoncé	Safe
Titoff & Silvia	23 (7,6,6,4)	53	Cha-Cha-Cha	Treasure - Bruno Mars	Safe
Noémie & Christian	24 (7,7,6,4)	50	Rumba	Sang pour sang - Johnny Hallyday	Eliminated
Damien & Candice	24 (9,5,5,5)	57	Foxtrot	Feeling Good - Nina Simone	Safe
Keen'V & Fauve	21 (6,5,6,4)	47	Paso Doble	Show Me Your Firetruck - Hans Zimmer	Last to be called Safe
Alizée & Grégoire	34 (9,9,8,8)	69	Rumba	J'te l'dis quand même - Patrick Bruel	Safe

=== Week 3: New Dances Week ===
Individual judges scores in the chart below (given in parentheses) are listed in this order from left to right:: Marie-Claude Pietragalla, Jean-Marc Généreux, Shy'm, Chris Marques.

Running order

Couple	Results			Style	Music	Result
Couple	Artistic	Technical	Total	Style	Music	Result
Alizée & Grégoire	35 (9,9,9,8)	34 (9,9,8,8)	69	Bollywood	Jai Ho! (You Are My Destiny) - The Pussycat Dolls	Safe
Laurent & Denitsa	31 (7,8,8,8)	24 (7,6,6,5)	55	Flamenco	Don't Let Me Be Misunderstood - Santa Esmeralda	Safe
Brahim & Katrina	26 (8,5,7,6)	28 (8,8,7,5)	54	Bolero	Là-bas - Jean-Jacques Goldman	Safe
Laury & Maxime	29 (6,8,8,7)	28 (7,7,7,7)	57	Modern Jazz	Someone like You - Adele	Bottom 2
Damien & Candice	31 (9,8,7,7)	24 (9,4,6,5)	55	Disco	You Should Be Dancing - Bee Gees	Eliminated
Tal & Yann-Alrick	35 (9,9,9,8)	31 (8,9,7,7)	66	Boogie-Woogie	Umbrella - The Baseballs	Safe
Titoff & Silvia	33 (8,9,8,8)	30 (8,8,7,7)	63	Bolero	Éblouie par la nuit - Zaz	Safe
Lætitia & Christophe	35 (9,9,9,8)	32 (8,8,8,8)	67	Disco	Disco Inferno - The Trammps	Safe
Keen'V & Fauve	30 (8,8,7,7)	23 (7,7,6,3)	53	Jazz Broadway	Creep - Richard Cheese	Safe
Dance Duel
Laury & Maxime	unknown (Note: Due to technical problems, votes were not accounted for and no elimination occurred.)			Boogie-Woogie	Wake Me Up! - Avicii	
Damien & Candice	unknown			Boogie-Woogie	Wake Me Up! - Avicii	

=== Week 4: Idol Week ===
Individual judges scores in the chart below (given in parentheses) are listed in this order from left to right:: Marie-Claude Pietragalla, Jean-Marc Généreux, Shy'm, Chris Marques.

Running order

Couple	Results			Style	Music	Result
Couple	Artistic	Technical	Total	Style	Music	Result
Dance Duel (Note: Due to technical problems the previous week, its bottom two had to face off again at the beginning of this show to decide their fate.)
Laury & Maxime	59%			Boogie-Woogie	Wake Me Up! - Avicii	Safe
Damien & Candice	41%			Boogie-Woogie	Wake Me Up! - Avicii	Eliminated
Main Competition
Laurent & Denitsa	31 (8,8,8,7)	30 (8,7,7,8)	61	Jive	Kiss You - One Direction	Safe
Alizée & Grégoire	37 (10,9,9,9)	32 (9,8,8,7)	69	Contemporary	Swan Lake - Pyotr Ilyich Tchaikovsky	Safe
Brahim & Katrina	36 (9,10,9,8)	36 (9,9,9,9)	72	Cha-Cha-Cha	Boogie Wonderland - Earth, Wind & Fire	Safe
Titoff & Silvia	27 (7,7,7,6)	23 (7,5,6,5)	50	Waltz	Le Droit à l'Erreur - Amel Bent	Eliminated
Lætitia & Christophe	31 (8,8,7,8)	29 (8,6,7,8)	60	Foxtrot	Candle in the Wind - Elton John	Safe
Keen'V & Fauve	28 (7,7,8,6)	28 (7,7,7,7)	56	Tango	Je ne suis pas un Héros - Daniel Balavoine	Safe
Laury & Maxime	32 (7,8,9,8)	31 (8,8,7,8)	63	Quickstep	A Little Party Never Killed Nobody (All We Got) - Fergie, Q-Tip & GoonRock	Bottom 2
Tal & Yann-Alrick	33 (9,8,9,7)	30 (9,7,8,6)	63	Rumba	Girl on Fire - Alicia Keys	Safe
Dance Duel
Laury & Maxime	61%			Cha-Cha-Cha	I Need Your Love - Calvin Harris	Safe
Titoff & Silvia	39%			Cha-Cha-Cha	I Need Your Love - Calvin Harris	Eliminated

=== Week 5: Dance Fusion Week ===
Individual judges scores in the chart below (given in parentheses) are listed in this order from left to right:: Marie-Claude Pietragalla, Jean-Marc Généreux, Shy'm, Chris Marques.

Running order

Couple	Results			Style	Music	Result
Couple	Artistic	Technical	Total	Style	Music	Result
Lætitia & Christophe	35 (9,10,8,8)	27 (8,7,7,5)	62	Cha-Cha-Cha/Paso Doble	Work Bitch - Britney Spears	Safe
Laurent & Denitsa	32 (9,8,8,7)	28 (9,7,6,6)	60	Foxtrot/Contemporary	Un Homme Heureux - William Sheller	Safe
Alizée & Grégoire	31 (9,6,8,8)	34 (9,9,8,8)	65	Samba/Paso Doble	Watch Out for This (Bumaye) - Major Lazer feat. Busy Signal, The Flexican & FS Green	Safe
Brahim & Katrina	37 (10,9,10,8)	37 (10,9,9,9)	74	Paso Doble/Jive	My Sharona - The Knack	Safe
Tal & Yann-Alrick	35 (9,9,9,8)	31 (9,8,7,7)	66	Foxtrot/Contemporary	Je suis un homme - Zazie	Bottom 2
Laury & Maxime	31 (8,7,8,8)	31 (8,8,7,8)	62	Rumba/Foxtrot	Stay - Rihanna feat. Mikky Ekko	Eliminated
Keen'V & Fauve	31 (8,8,8,7)	25 (7,6,6,6)	56	Rumba/Foxtrot	People Help the People - Birdy	Safe
Samba Relay
Alizée & Grégoire	+35		100	Samba	I Follow Rivers (The Magician Remix) - Lykke Li	
Lætitia & Christophe	+30		92	Samba	I Follow Rivers (The Magician Remix) - Lykke Li	
Tal & Yann-Alrick	+25		91	Samba	I Follow Rivers (The Magician Remix) - Lykke Li	
Brahim & Katrina	+20		94	Samba	I Follow Rivers (The Magician Remix) - Lykke Li	
Laurent & Denitsa	+15		75	Samba	I Follow Rivers (The Magician Remix) - Lykke Li	
Laury & Maxime	+10		72	Samba	I Follow Rivers (The Magician Remix) - Lykke Li	
Keen'V & Fauve	+5		61	Samba	I Follow Rivers (The Magician Remix) - Lykke Li	
Dance Duel
Tal & Yann-Alrick	72%			Cha-Cha-Cha	Summertime Sadness - Lana Del Rey	Safe
Laury & Maxime	28%			Cha-Cha-Cha	Summertime Sadness - Lana Del Rey	Eliminated

=== Week 6: 15 Second Solo Week ===
Individual judges scores in the chart below (given in parentheses) are listed in this order from left to right:: Marie-Claude Pietragalla, Jean-Marc Généreux, Shy'm, Chris Marques.

Running order

Couple	Results				Style	Music	Result
Couple	Artistic	Technical	Total		Style	Music	Result
Alizée & Grégoire	32 (8,8,8,8)	25 (7,5,7,6)	57	127	Tango	Video Games - The Young Professionals	Safe
Alizée & Grégoire	35 (9,9,9,8)	35 (9,9,8,9)	70	127	Flamenco	La Gitane - Félix Gray	Safe
Brahim & Katrina	36 (9,9,9,9)	36 (9,9,9,9)	72	143	Contemporary	Iron - Woodkid	Safe
Brahim & Katrina	35 (9,9,9,8)	36 (9,9,9,9)	71	143	Samba	Barbie Girl - Aqua	Safe
Laurent & Denitsa	28 (8,7,7,6)	22 (6,5,6,5)	50	98	Samba	Bella - Maître Gims	Safe
Laurent & Denitsa	26 (7,7,6,6)	22 (7,6,5,4)	48	98	Bolero	Total Eclipse of the Heart - Bonnie Tyler	Safe
Lætitia & Christophe	29 (7,8,8,6)	26 (7,6,7,6)	55	123	Contemporary	Roar - Katy Perry	Bottom 2
Lætitia & Christophe	35 (8,9,9,9)	33 (8,8,8,9)	68	123	Rumba	You Call It Love - Karoline Krüger	Bottom 2
Keen'V & Fauve	24 (7,6,8,3)	21 (6,5,6,4)	45	104	Cha-Cha-Cha	Je te donne - Jean-Jacques Goldman	Safe
Keen'V & Fauve	31 (8,8,8,7)	28 (7,7,7,7)	59	104	Contemporary	Wrecking Ball - Miley Cyrus	Safe
Tal & Yann-Alrick	30 (8,6,8,8)	29 (8,6,8,7)	59	116	Waltz	Tomber dans ses yeux - Camille Lou & Louis Delort	Eliminated
Tal & Yann-Alrick	31 (8,8,8,7)	26 (8,6,7,5)	57	116	Cha-Cha-Cha	Wannabe - Spice Girls	Eliminated
Dance Duel
Lætitia & Christophe	51%				Jive	Happy - C2C feat. Derek Martin	Safe
Tal & Yann-Alrick	49%				Jive	Happy - C2C feat. Derek Martin	Eliminated

=== Week 7: Dance trio week ===
Individual judges scores in the chart below (given in parentheses) are listed in this order from left to right:: Marie-Claude Pietragalla, Jean-Marc Généreux, Shy'm, Chris Marques.

Running order

Couple	Results				Style	Music	Result
Couple	Artistic	Technical	Total		Style	Music	Result
Alizée & Grégoire	35 (9,9,8,9)	34 (9,9,8,8)	69	142	Charleston	Bang Bang - will.i.am	Safe
Alizée & Grégoire	39 (10,10,10,9)	34 (9,9,9,7)	73	142	Rumba (with Candice Pascal)	Une femme avec une femme - Mecano	Safe
Laurent & Denitsa	26 (8,6,7,5)	20 (6,5,5,4)	46	100	Waltz	A corps perdu - Grégory Lemarchal	Eliminated
Laurent & Denitsa	30 (8,8,7,7)	24 (7,6,7,4)	54	100	Jive (with Silvia Notargiacomo)	Proud Mary - Ike & Tina Turner	Eliminated
Brahim & Katrina	37 (10,9,9,9)	35 (9,8,9,9)	72	148	Foxtrot	New York, New York - Frank Sinatra	Safe
Brahim & Katrina	38 (10,9,10,9)	38 (10,9,10,9)	76	148	Rumba (with Coralie Licata)	When I Was Your Man - Bruno Mars	Safe
Keen'V & Fauve	26 (7,7,7,5)	29 (7,7,7,8)	55	108	Quickstep	Je veux - Zaz	Bottom 2
Keen'V & Fauve	29 (8,7,7,7)	24 (7,6,6,5)	53	108	Salsa (with Christian Millette)	Party Rock Anthem - LMFAO	Bottom 2
Lætitia & Maxime	30 (7,8,8,7)	26 (7,7,6,6)	56	114	American smooth	Born to Die - Lana Del Rey	Safe
Lætitia & Maxime	30 (9,8,8,5)	28 (8,8,7,5)	58	114	Jive (with Christian Millette)	L'Aventurier - Indochine	Safe
Dance Duel
Keen'V & Fauve	62%				Samba	Burn - Ellie Goulding	Safe
Laurent & Denitsa	38%				Samba	Burn - Ellie Goulding	Eliminated

=== Week 8: Semi-finals ===
Individual judges scores in the chart below (given in parentheses) are listed in this order from left to right:: Marie-Claude Pietragalla, Jean-Marc Généreux, Shy'm, Chris Marques.

Running order

Couple	Results				Style	Music	Result
Couple	Artistic	Technical	Total		Style	Music	Result
Alizée & Grégoire	38 (10,10,9,9)	33 (9,8,8,8)	71	137	Jive	Crazy in Love - The Baseballs	Bottom 2
Alizée & Grégoire	35 (9,8,9,9)	31 (9,8,8,6)	66	137	Foxtrot	Somewhere Only We Know - Keane	Bottom 2
Brahim & Katrina	34 (9,9,8,8)	34 (9,9,8,8)	68	143	Paso Doble	Ianuarii ira - Verdi Remix	Safe
Brahim & Katrina	39 (10,10,10,9)	36 (9,9,9,9)	75	143	Quickstep	Gangnam Style - Psy	Safe
Keen'V & Fauve	32 (8,8,8,8)	29 (8,7,7,7)	61	122	Tango	Fan - Pascal Obispo	Eliminated
Keen'V & Fauve	32 (9,8,8,7)	29 (7,8,7,7)	61	122	Jive	Runaway Baby - Bruno Mars	Eliminated
Lætitia & Christian	31 (8,8,7,8)	29 (7,8,7,7)	60	121	Tango	Viva la vida - Coldplay	Safe
Lætitia & Christian	32 (8,8,8,8)	29 (7,7,7,8)	61	121	Waltz	It's a Man's Man's Man's World - Christina Aguilera	Safe
Dance Marathon
Alizée & Grégoire	+40		177		Cha-Cha-Cha + Waltz + Jive + Rumba	Sexy and I Know It - LMFAO + The Blue Danube - Johann Strauss II + Shake Your Tail Feather - The Blues Brothers + Just Give Me a Reason - Pink	
Brahim & Katrina	+30		173		Cha-Cha-Cha + Waltz + Jive + Rumba	Sexy and I Know It - LMFAO + The Blue Danube - Johann Strauss II + Shake Your Tail Feather - The Blues Brothers + Just Give Me a Reason - Pink	
Lætitia & Christian	+20		141		Cha-Cha-Cha + Waltz + Jive + Rumba	Sexy and I Know It - LMFAO + The Blue Danube - Johann Strauss II + Shake Your Tail Feather - The Blues Brothers + Just Give Me a Reason - Pink	
Keen'V & Fauve	+10		132		Cha-Cha-Cha + Waltz + Jive + Rumba	Sexy and I Know It - LMFAO + The Blue Danube - Johann Strauss II + Shake Your Tail Feather - The Blues Brothers + Just Give Me a Reason - Pink	
Dance Duel
Alizée & Grégoire	65%				Salsa	A nos actes manqués - M. Pokora	Safe
Keen'V & Fauve	35%				Salsa	A nos actes manqués - M. Pokora	Eliminated

=== Week 9: Finals ===
Individual judges scores in the chart below (given in parentheses) are listed in this order from left to right:: Marie-Claude Pietragalla, Jean-Marc Généreux, Shy'm, Chris Marques.

Running order

Couple	Results				Style	Music	Result
Couple	Artistic	Technical	Total		Style	Music	Result
Alizée & Grégoire	35 (9,9,9,8)	33 (9,8,8,8)	68	147	Cha-Cha-Cha	Scream & Shout - Will.I.Am ft. Britney Spears	Winner
Alizée & Grégoire	40 (10,10,10,10)	39 (10,10,10,9)	79	147	Rumba	Pas toi - Tal	Winner
Lætitia & Christophe	36 (9,9,9,9)	35 (8,9,9,9)	71	134	Foxtrot	I'll Stand by You - Pretenders	3rd Place
Lætitia & Christophe	34 (8,10,8,8)	29 (8,7,7,7)	63	134	Cha-Cha-Cha	Slow Down - Selena Gomez	3rd Place
Brahim & Katrina	39 (10,10,10,9)	36 (9,9,9,9)	75	151	Samba	I Want You Back - Jackson 5	2nd Place
Brahim & Katrina	39 (10,10,10,9)	37 (10,9,10,8)	76	151	Rumba	Skyfall - Adele	2nd Place
Megamix
Brahim & Katrina	37 (9,10,9,9)			188	Rumba + Paso Doble + Jive	Next To Me - Emeli Sandé + Roadgame - Kavinsky + SOS - Rihanna	
Alizée & Grégoire	34 (8,9,8,9)			181	Rumba + Paso Doble + Jive	Next To Me - Emeli Sandé + Roadgame - Kavinsky + SOS - Rihanna	
Lætitia & Christophe	31 (8,8,8,7)			165	Rumba + Paso Doble + Jive	Next To Me - Emeli Sandé + Roadgame - Kavinsky + SOS - Rihanna	
The last dance
Alizée & Grégoire	55%				Freestyle	One - cover of U2	
Brahim & Katrina	45%				Freestyle	Nothing Compares 2 U - Sinéad O'Connor	

== Call-Out Order ==
The Table Lists in which order the contestants' fates were revealed by Quétier and Cerutti.

Contestant call-out order
Order	2	3	4	5	6	7	8	9
1	Laëtitia & Christophe	Laëtitia & Christophe	Laëtitia & Christophe	Laëtitia & Christophe	Keen'V & Fauve	Alizée & Grégoire	Brahim & Katrina	Alizée & Grégoire
2	Alizée & Grégoire	Alizée & Grégoire	Alizée & Grégoire	Laury & Maxime	Laëtitia & Christophe	Brahim & Katrina	Keen'V & Fauve	Brahim & Katrina
3	Damien & Candice	Laurent & Denitsa	Titoff & Silvia	Alizée & Grégoire	Alizée & Grégoire	Laurent & Denitsa	Laëtitia & Christophe	Laëtitia & Christophe
4	Laury & Maxime	Laury & Maxime	Brahim & Katrina	Keen'V & Fauve	Brahim & Katrina	Laëtitia & Christophe	Alizée & Grégoire	
5	Brahim & Katrina	Titoff & Silvia	Tal & Yann-Alrick	Brahim & Katrina	Laurent & Denitsa	Keen'V & Fauve		
6	Laurent & Denitsa	Brahim & Katrina	Keen'V & Fauve	Laurent & Denitsa	Tal & Yann-Alrick			
7	Titoff & Silvia	Tal & Yann-Alrick	Laurent & Denitsa	Tal & Yann-Alrick				
8	Tal & Yann-Alrick	Keen'V & Fauve	Laury & Maxime					
9	Keen'V & Fauve	Damien & Candice						
10	Noémie & Christian							

This couple came in first place with the judges.
This couple came in last place with the judges but were saved.
This couple came in last place with the judges and was eliminated.
This couple were in danger but was saved.
This couple was eliminated.
This couple won the competition.
This couple came in second in the competition.
This couple came in third in the competition.

== Dance Chart ==
The celebrities and professional partners danced one of these routines for each corresponding week.

- Week 1 : Cha-Cha-Cha, Contemporary, Tango or Quickstep
- Week 2 : American Smooth, Cha-Cha-Cha, Contemporary, Foxtrot, Pasodoble or Rumba (Personal Story week)
- Week 3 : Bollywood, Bolero, Boogie-woogie, Disco dancing, Flamenco or Jazz dance (New Dances week)
- Week 4 : Cha-Cha-Cha, Contemporary, Foxtrot, Jive, Quickstep, Rumba, Tango or Waltz (Idol week)
- Week 5 : Cha-Cha-Cha, Contemporary, Foxtrot, Jive, Paso Doble, Rumba or Samba (Dance Fusion week)
- Week 6 : Bolero, Cha-Cha-Cha, Contemporary, Flamenco, Rumba, Samba, Tango or Waltz (15 Second Solo week)
- Week 7 : American smooth, Charleston, Foxtrot, Jive, Quickstep, Rumba, Salsa, Samba, Waltz (Trio week)
- Week 8 : Cha-Cha-Cha, Foxtrot, Jive, Paso Doble, Quickstep, Rumba, Salsa, Tango, Waltz (Semi-finals)
- Week 9 : Cha-Cha-Cha, Foxtrot, Jive, Paso Doble, Rumba, Samba (Finals)

Couple	1	2	3	4	5		6	7	8		9		
Alizée & Grégoire	Cha-Cha-Cha	Rumba	Bollywood	Contemporary	Samba/Paso Doble	Samba Relay	Tango	Charleston	Jive	Cha-Cha-Cha / Waltz / Jive / Rumba	Cha-Cha-Cha	Rumba / Paso Doble / Jive	Freestyle
Alizée & Grégoire	Cha-Cha-Cha	Rumba	Bollywood	Contemporary	Samba/Paso Doble	Samba Relay	Flamenco	Rumba	Foxtrot	Cha-Cha-Cha / Waltz / Jive / Rumba	Rumba	Rumba / Paso Doble / Jive	Freestyle
Brahim & Katrina	Tango	Contemporary	Bolero	Cha-Cha-Cha	Paso Doble/Jive	Samba Relay	Contemporary	Foxtrot	Paso Doble	Cha-Cha-Cha / Waltz / Jive / Rumba	Samba	Rumba / Paso Doble / Jive	Freestyle
Brahim & Katrina	Tango	Contemporary	Bolero	Cha-Cha-Cha	Paso Doble/Jive	Samba Relay	Samba	Rumba	Quickstep	Cha-Cha-Cha / Waltz / Jive / Rumba	Rumba	Rumba / Paso Doble / Jive	Freestyle
Lætitia & Christophe	Quickstep	American Smooth	Disco dancing	Foxtrot	Cha-Cha-Cha/Paso Doble	Samba Relay	Contemporary	American smooth	Tango	Cha-Cha-Cha / Waltz / Jive / Rumba	Foxtrot	Rumba / Paso Doble / Jive	
Lætitia & Christophe	Quickstep	American Smooth	Disco dancing	Foxtrot	Cha-Cha-Cha/Paso Doble	Samba Relay	Rumba	Jive	Waltz	Cha-Cha-Cha / Waltz / Jive / Rumba	Cha-Cha-Cha	Rumba / Paso Doble / Jive	
Keen'V & Fauve	Contemporary	Paso doble	Jazz Broadway	Tango	Rumba/Foxtrot	Samba Relay	Cha-Cha-Cha	Quickstep	Tango	Cha-Cha-Cha / Waltz / Jive / Rumba			
Keen'V & Fauve	Contemporary	Paso doble	Jazz Broadway	Tango	Rumba/Foxtrot	Samba Relay	Contemporary	Salsa	Jive	Cha-Cha-Cha / Waltz / Jive / Rumba			
Laurent & Denitsa	Quickstep	Rumba	Flamenco	Jive	Foxtrot/Contemporary	Samba Relay	Samba	Waltz					
Laurent & Denitsa	Quickstep	Rumba	Flamenco	Jive	Foxtrot/Contemporary	Samba Relay	Bolero	Jive					
Tal & Yann-Alrick	Contemporary	Paso doble	Boogie-woogie	Rumba	Foxtrot/Contemporary	Samba Relay	Waltz						
Tal & Yann-Alrick	Contemporary	Paso doble	Boogie-woogie	Rumba	Foxtrot/Contemporary	Samba Relay	Cha-Cha-Cha						
Laury & Maxime	Cha-Cha-Cha	American Smooth	Modern Jazz	Quickstep	Rumba/Foxtrot	Samba Relay							
Titoff & Silvia	Tango	Cha-Cha-Cha	Bolero	Waltz									
Damien & Candice	Contemporary	Foxtrot	Disco dancing										
Noémie & Christian	Tango	Rumba											

Highest scoring dance
Lowest scoring dance
Danced, but not scored

== Musical Guests ==
Date	Performers	Tracks Performed	Dancers
October 19, 2013	Robin Thicke	Blurred Lines; Give It 2 U	Professional Dancers
November 2, 2013	Camille Lou & Louis Delort	Tomber dans ses yeux	Tal & Yann-Alrick
November 2, 2013	Garou	Avancer	Professional Dancers
November 9, 2013	Olympe	Born to Die	Professional Dancers
November 16, 2013	Vincent Niclo, Damien Sargue & Roch Voisine	Fly Me to the Moon	Jean-Marc Généreux, Chris Marques & Professional Dancers
November 23, 2013	Emmanuel Moire	Beau malheur Ne s'aimer que la nuit	Fauve & Professional Dancers

== France television ratings ==
Show	Episode	Air date	Viewers (millions)	Rating/share Viewers over 4	Rating/share Housewives under 50	Weekly Viewer rank	Note
1	"Top 10 Perform (Week 1)"	September 28, 2013	6.016	28.9%	37%	1	
1	"After Show (Week 1)"	September 28, 2013	3.3	27.7%	33%	1	
2	"Top 10 Perform (Week 2)"	October 5, 2013	5.742	28.1%	35%	1	
2	"After Show (Week 2)"	October 5, 2013	2.6	22.6%	28%	1	
3	"Top 9 Perform"	October 12, 2013	6.164	29.9%	35%	1	
3	"After Show (Week 3)"	October 12, 2013	3.5	29.7%	34%	1	
4	"Top 8 Perform"	October 19, 2013	6.104	28.6%	38%	1	
4	"After Show (Week 4)"	October 19, 2013	3	24.5%	27%	1	
5	"Top 7 Perform"	October 26, 2013	5.774	27.2%	34%	1	
5	"After Show (Week 5)"	October 26, 2013	3.1	21.9%	28%	1	
6	"Top 6 Perform"	November 2, 2013	5.49	25.5%	-	1	
6	"After Show (Week 6)"	November 2, 2013	2.9	25.4%	-	1	
7	"Top 5 Perform"	November 9, 2013	5.876	25.7%	30%	2	
7	"After Show (Week 7)"	November 9, 2013	3.3	26.4%	30%	1	
8	"Semi-finals"	November 16, 2013	5.71	25.9%	33%	1	
8	"After Show (Week 8)"	November 16, 2013	3.32	26.9%	31%	1	
9	"Finals"	November 23, 2013	6.3	28.2%	34%	1	
9	"After Show (Week 9)"	November 23, 2013	2.7	27%	33%	1	
9	"Extra (Week 9)"	November 23, 2013	2.1	25%	-	1	
