= Homeless (Marina Kaye song) =

Single by Marina Kaye

from the album Fearless
- Released: 16 June 2014
- Recorded: 2014
- Genre: Pop; pop rock
- Length: 3:40
- Label: Capitol Records (Universal Music Group)
- Songwriters: Nina Woodford; Mathias Wollo; Marina Dalmas
- Producer: Tristan Salvati

Marina Kaye singles chronology
"Homeless" (2014)	"Dancing with the Devil" (2015)

Music video
- "Homeless" on YouTube

"Homeless" is the 2014 debut single of Marina Kaye, the 2011 winner of La France a un incroyable talent (France Got Talent). The song was written and composed by Marina "Kaye" Dalmas with Mathias Wollo and Nina Woodford and is taken from Marina Kaye's debut EP also called Homeless on Capitol Records (part of Universal Music France). The release was accompanied by a music video directed by Hugo Becker.

== Homeless EP ==
The similarly titled EP contains in addition an acoustic version of the song.

=== Track list ===
1. "Homeless" (3:40)
2. "Live Before I Die" (3:29)
3. "The Price I've Had to Pay" (Acoustic version) (4:03)
4. "Homeless" (Acoustic version) (3:37)

== Charts ==
=== Weekly charts ===
Chart (2014–2015)	Peak position
Belgium (Ultratop 50 Flanders)	35
Belgium (Ultratop 50 Wallonia)	1
France (SNEP)	1
Switzerland (Schweizer Hitparade)	25

=== Year-end charts ===
Chart (2015)	Position
Belgium (Ultratop Wallonia)	15
France (SNEP)	5

== Certifications ==
Region	Certification	Certified units/sales
Belgium (BRMA)	Gold	15,000^{*}
France (SNEP)	Platinum	150,000^{*}
^{*} Sales figures based on certification alone.
