= Zénith de Lille =

Indoor arena in Lille, France

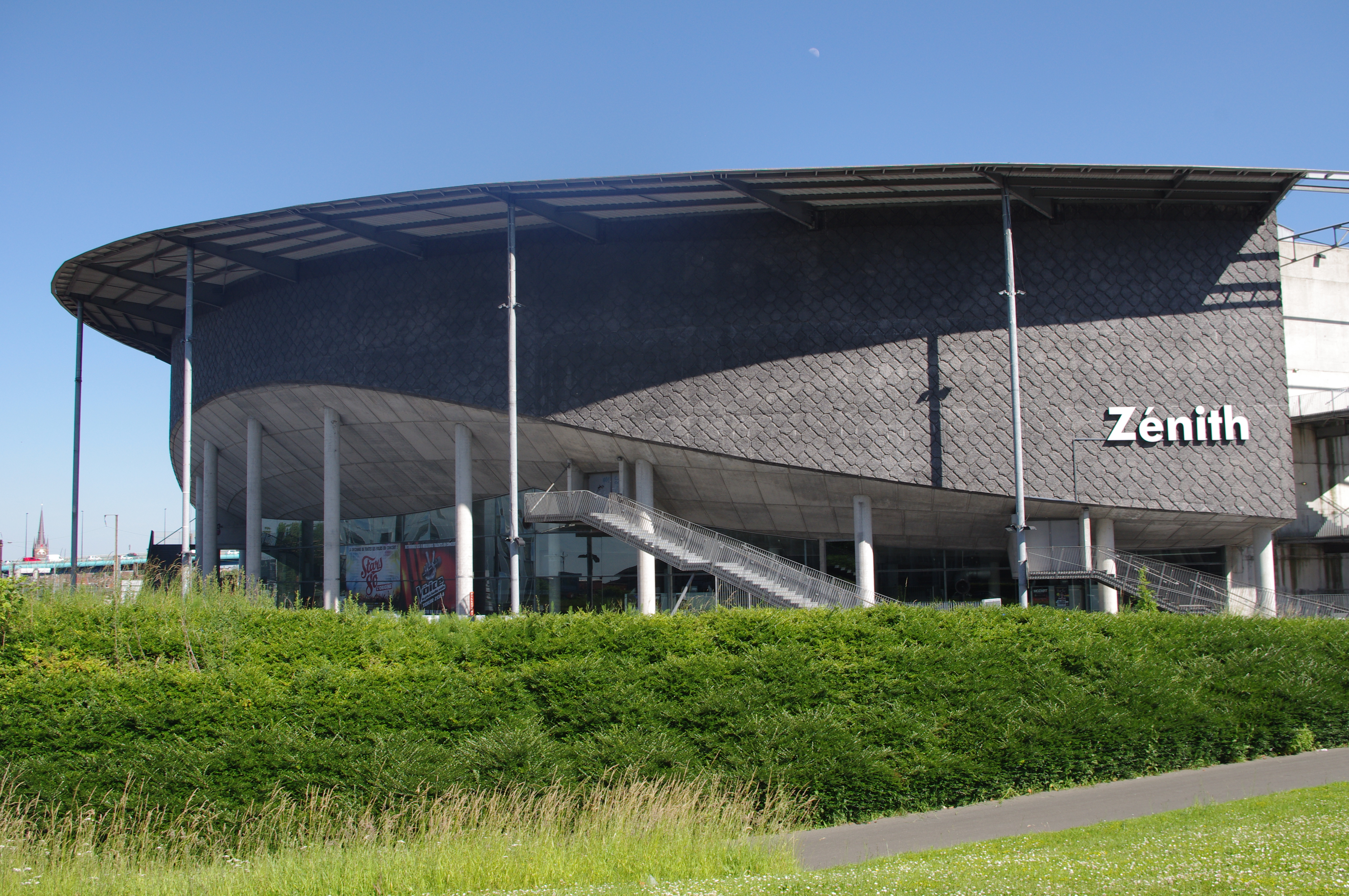
- Zénith de Lille from the outside.
- Interactive map of Zénith de Lille
- Former names: Zénith Arena
- Address: 1 Bd des Cités Unies
- Location: Lille, France
- Coordinates: 50°38′01″N 3°04′39″E
- Owner: City of Lille
- Capacity: 7,000

Construction
- Opened: 1994

Website
- Venue Website (in French)

The Zénith de Lille (originally Zénith Arena) is a multi-purpose indoor arena in Lille, France. Its ability to seat up to 7,000 people makes it one of the largest venues in Lille. The closest métro station is Lille Grand Palais.

Designed by the Dutch architect Rem Koolhaas with Cecil Balmond and inaugurated in 1994, the Zénith Arena is a part of the cultural complex Lille Grand Palais which includes two other spaces: a congress center and exhibition halls. Rem Koolhaas surrounded himself with Renz van Luxemburg for the acoustic studies, dUCKS scéno for the scenography and Arup Group for the engineering studies.

== See also ==
- Le Zénith
