= Laurent Ournac =

French actor and comedian (born 1980)

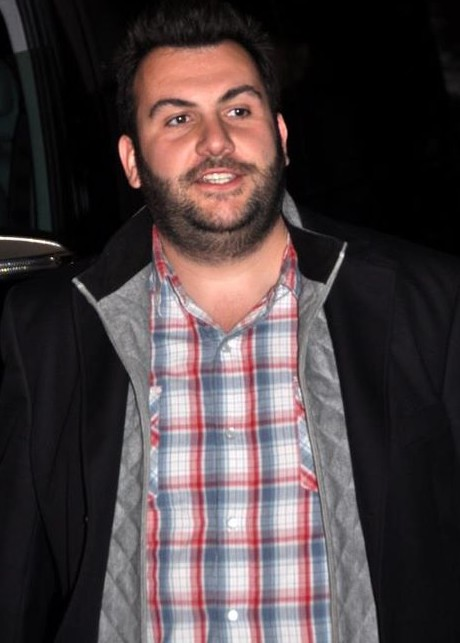
- Laurent Ournac at the 2012 NRJ Music Award
- Born: 26 April 1980 (age 46); Versailles, France
- Occupations: Actor, Comedian
- Years active: 2005-present
- Spouse: Ludivine Ournac (2014–present)
- Children: 1

Laurent Ournac (born 26 April 1980) is a French actor and comedian.

== Career ==
In 2005, Ournac became famous for playing Laurent Fortin in the French version of the TV Show My Big Fat Obnoxious Fiance.

In 2013 he was one of the contestant during the Fourth season of Danse avec les stars. He finished on fifth place with his dancing partner Denitsa Ikonomova. Then he became the co-host of the show alongside Sandrine Quétier.

== Filmography ==
Year	Title	Role	Director	Notes
2006	Les enfants j'adore	Michel	Didier Albert	TV movie
2006–present	Camping paradis	Tom Delormes	Philippe Proteau, Didier Albert (2), ...	TV series (46 episodes)
2007	Ma vie n'est pas une comédie romantique	Fat Bill	Marc Gibaja	
2007	Joséphine, ange gardien	Antoine Mercier	Pascal Heylbroeck	TV series (1 episode)
2008	Paris Nord Sud	Syriak	Franck Llopis	
2008	La mort dans l'île	Lieutenant Crespau	Philippe Setbon	TV movie
2008	Ma soeur est moi	Lucas	Didier Albert (3)	TV movie
2008	Une suite pour 2	Anthony	Didier Albert (4)	TV movie
2010	Merci papa, merci maman	Gilles-Henri	Vincent Giovanni	TV movie
2012-14	Nos chers voisins	Fred	Emmanuel Rigaut	TV series (2 episodes)

== Theater ==
Year	Title	Author	Director	Notes
2013	Du piment dans le caviar	Carole Greep & Guillaume Labbé	Thierry Lavat	Tour
2014	Les Triplettes de Belleville dans Go Ouest	Sylvain Chomet	Julien Baptiste	Tour
2015	Le Gai mariage	Michel Munz & Gérard Bitton	Raymond Aquaviva	Casino de Paris

== Television ==
Year	Title	Author	Notes
2005	Mon incroyable fiancé	Comedian	
2013	Danse avec les stars 4	Contestant	5th Place
2015–present	Danse avec les stars	Co-Host	
