= Blonde (disambiguation) =

Blonde is a hair color.

Blonde or The Blonde may also refer to:

- Blonde Ale, a type of beer

== Film, TV and entertainment ==
- Blonde, a 2000 novel by Joyce Carol Oates, with a fictionalized take on the life of American actress Marilyn Monroe
  - Blonde, a 2001 film based on the novel
  - Blonde, a 2022 film based on the novel
- Blonde, a 1950 French comedy film
- Blonde, a 2025 Japanese drama film
- The Blonde, a 1980 American porn film starring Annette Haven
- The Blonde, a 1993 Italian film starring Nastassja Kinski

== Ships ==
- Blonde-class cruiser, a two ship class of light scout cruisers
- Blonde (1803 ship), a French 32-gun privateer corvette
- HMS Blonde (1819), a modified Apollo class frigate, which undertook an important voyage to the Pacific in 1824
- HMS Blonde (1910), a Blonde class scout cruiser

== Music ==
=== Artists ===
- Blonde (duo), a British-based electronic music duo
- Blondes (band), a New York City-based electronic music duo

=== Albums ===
- Blonde (Cœur de pirate album), 2011
- Blonde (Alizée album), 2014
- Blonde (Frank Ocean album), 2016
- Blonde (Tigirlily Gold album), 2024
- Blonde, an LP by the band Ghost Beach, 2014
- Blondes (Blondes album), 2012
- Blondes (John Stewart album), 1982

=== Songs ===
- "Blonde" (Alizée song), 2014
- "Blonde" (Akina Nakamori song), 1987
- "Blonde", a song by Bridgit Mendler from Hello My Name Is..., 2012
- "Blonde", a song by Barnaby Bye, 1975
- "Blonde", a song by Maisie Peters, 2022
- "Blonde", a song by Waterparks from Entertainment, 2017
- "The Blonde", a song by TV Girl from French Exit

== See also ==
- Blond (disambiguation)
- HMS Blonde – list of ships with this name
- Mr. Blonde
- Stella Goldschlag (1922–1994), nicknamed the "Blonde Poison" by the Nazis.
- Blondie (disambiguation)
- Platinum Blonde (disambiguation)
