= Atomic blonde =

Atomic blonde may refer to:

- Platinum blonde hair
- Blonde bombshell (stereotype)
- Atomic Blonde, a 2017 spy film starring Charlize Theron
  - The Coldest City (2012 comic), comic book the film is based on, referred to also as "Atomic Blonde" after the film tie-in edition
  - Atomic Blonde (soundtrack), soundtrack to the 2017 film

== See also ==
- Atomic (song), 1979 song by Blondie
- Atomic: The Very Best of Blondie (1998 album)
- Platinum Blonde (disambiguation)
- Atomic (disambiguation)
- Blonde (disambiguation)
- Blond (disambiguation)
