= 5 (Alizée album) =

Studio album by Alizée
- Released: 25 March 2013
- Recorded: 2011–2012
- Studios: Studio Low-Fi (Paris); ICP Studios (Brussels)
- Genre: French pop
- Length: 37:09
- Label: Sony Music
- Producer: Alexandre Azaria

Alizée chronology
Une enfant du siècle (2010)	5 (2013)	Blonde (2014)

Singles from 5
- 1. "À cause de l'automne" Released: 4 July 2012; 2. "Je veux bien" Released: 22 April 2013

5 ("Cinq") [French pronunciation: [sɛ̃k]] is the fifth studio album by French recording artist Alizée. Originally scheduled for release in 2012, it was finally released on 25 March 2013 by Sony Music. Its music incorporates pop styles with elements of dance-pop, rock in the form of upbeat songs, piano-driven ballads and a renewed '60s style. The name and cover of the album were announced on 3 January 2013 on Star Academy. The first single to be released from the album was "À cause de l'automne" on 4 July 2012. The album was recorded in Paris and Brussels. With Alexandre Azaria as executive producer, she collaborated with a wide range of musicians, including many whom she had not collaborated with before, such as Thomas Boulard and BB Brunes.

It debuted at 23rd place on the French Albums Chart, with first-week sales of 8,000 copies. Internationally, the album charted moderately, marking career lows for Alizée. Two singles were released from the album. The first single, "À cause de l'automne", charted within the top 200 of the French-speaking countries. The second single, "Je veux bien", was released in April 2013.

== Development ==
In early 2011, rumours that Alizée's fifth studio album was being recorded started and about a month later it was confirmed that Alizée was among the artists who recorded a duet with Alain Chamfort, whose collaboration single "Clara veut la Lune" was released on 29 April 2012. She announced a new album scheduled for spring 2012. Later Sony announced delay of the album till the fall of 2012.

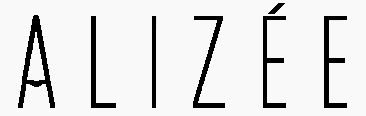
The new logo released with the new single in 2012

During the release of Alain Chamfort's album Elles & Lui, Alizée confirmed in an interview by off TV that she was currently recording her fifth studio album. According to Alizée, the new album was "introspective and fresh" and represent a natural continuation of her career. Later, Alizée revealed change in her style on the fifth studio album because she wanted to reach a wider audience than with her last album, which she called an "artistical and abstract experiment".

"My album will be amazing," said Alizée. "I'm excited. I have worked hard in the studio. Different producers with whom I'm working with really encouraged me and gave me incredible tracks and beats. It's full of fun and excitement and will be released later this year"... by Alizée

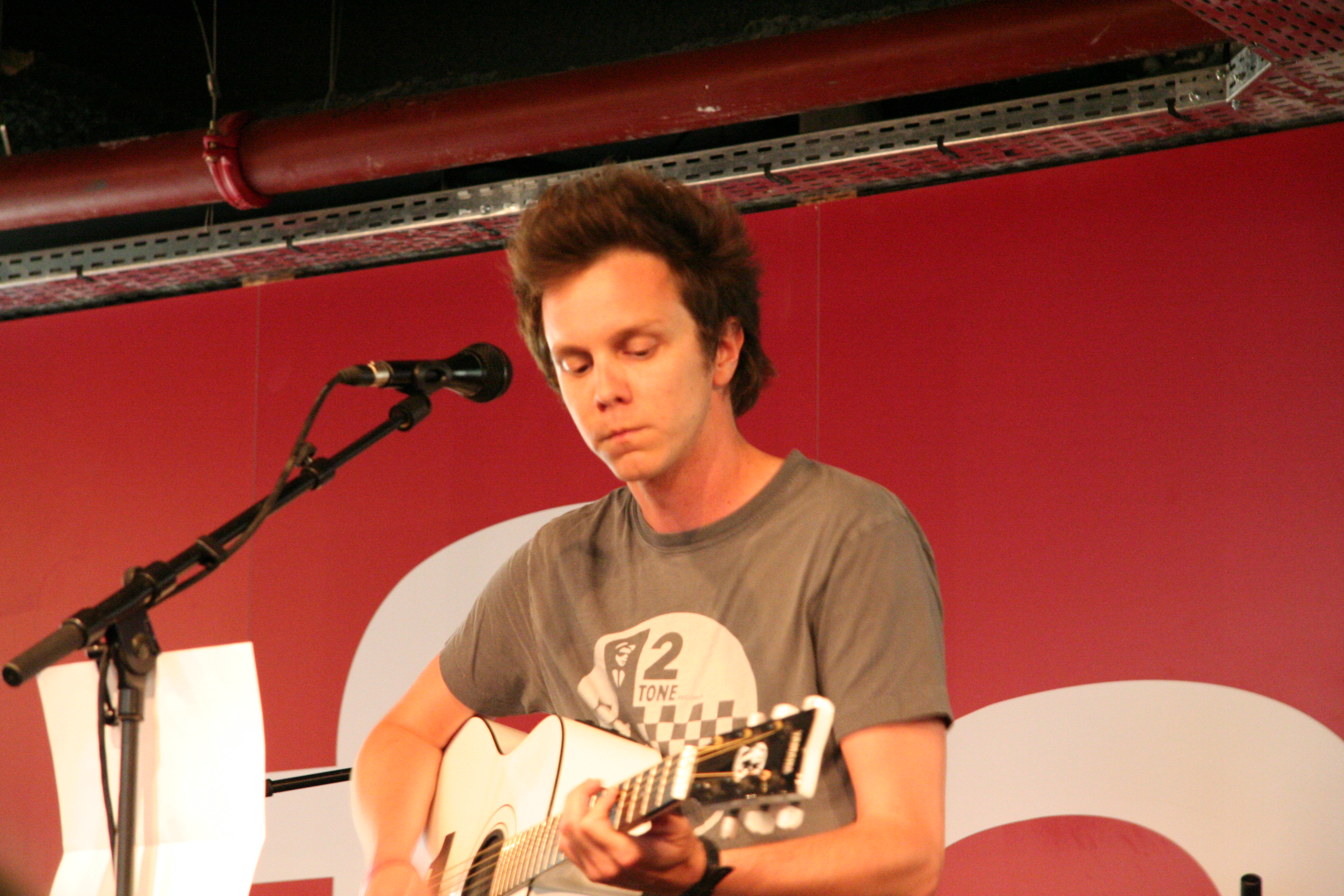
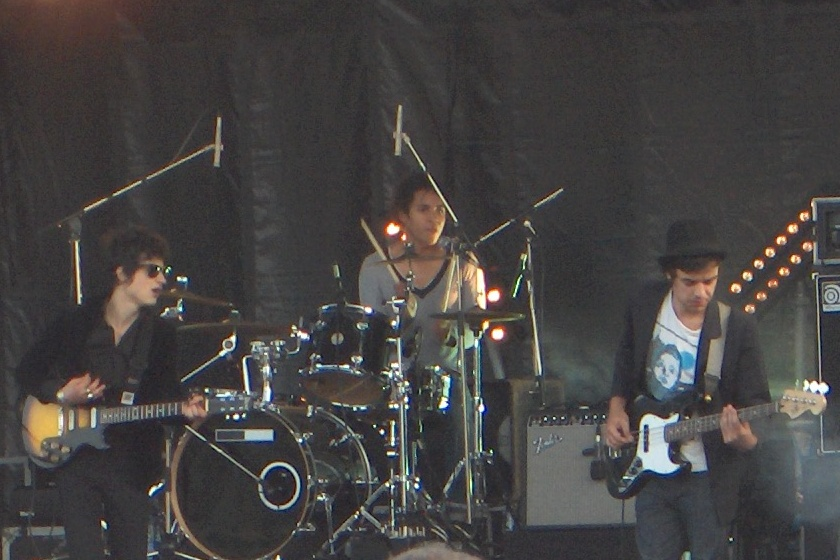
Thomas Boulard (left) and BB Brunes (right) are some collaborators in Alizée's fifth studio album.

On 27 June 2012, Alizée announced on a live chat that the first single of the new album would be released on 28 June 2012. The music video was shot on 15 July 2012. The name of the single is "Á cause de l'automne" (English: "Because of the Autumn"). Alizée also revealed that for the new album she was working with Jean-Jacques Goldman, BB Brunes and Thomas Boulard (singer and guitarist of French rock band "Luke"). On 30 January 2013, Alizée announced on MFM Radio that Goldman wrote two songs for the album but they would not be on the final version of the album. On 12 July, a limited collector's edition of 5 became available for pre-order.

The original release date was announced to be 1 October 2012, but on 3 September Alizée and her team announced another delay of a few weeks. On 14 September, Alizée announced on Facebook that the album had been delayed until early 2013.

On 23 October, a teaser video was published on her official YouTube channel where she confirmed the album's release to be during the first trimester of 2013. On 15 January, Alizée released the cover art of the new album, and mentioned another delay of the album. The final release date was 25 March 2013.

On 5 December, the official video for "À cause de l'automne" was released on Alizée's VEVO channel. After two days of the pre-release of 5, Alizée was already in the Top 200 of iTunes in France and Mexico.

== Promotion ==
=== Live performances ===
Along single releases, Alizée promoted the album with various live performances on radio, TV and various events. In September 2012, she had a DJ set in a famous Parisian night club called Complexe Kes West. On 26 October 2012, she had another set at Carré Rouge night club in Avignon and another one on 23 November at Le Chat Noir night club in Dijon.

The first public performance of À cause de l'automne was on RFM radio on 21 December 2012 where she sang it live.

On 3 January 2013, the name and cover of the album was shown on a French TV show Star Academy, where Alizée made a guest appearance. From January she performed the song in various shows, including Soccer Beach Show in Monaco on 9 February.

On 16 June, TF1 confirmed Alizée's participation for Le Tour de France 2013 opening ceremony in Porto-Vecchio on 29 June.

=== Magazines ===
Released in late December, the January/February 2013 issue of the French Inked magazine had an article of Alizée and featuring her on the cover page as a manacled and bloodied punk princess. Photos were taken by French photographer Julien Lachaussée.

Among other magazines, POSE Mag and Liz Magazine released articles of her.

Professional ratings
Review scores
Source	Rating
SACEM/SNEP	Positive
melty.fr	Positive
metro	5/5 stars
Le Parisien	Positive
RTL	5/5 stars

== Singles ==
The first single from the album was "À cause de l'automne". It was released on 28 June 2012 on Alizée's official website at 5 p.m. French time. The single was released to French iTunes on 4 July 2012, exactly 12 years after the anniversary of "Moi... Lolita".

The second single from the album is "Je veux bien", which release Alizée confirmed on Facebook on 8 April 2013. The single was released on 22 April 2013. The single was supposed to have a music video to be released in spring 2013 but the video was never produced.

=== Promotional songs ===
"Dans mon sac", the second extract from the album, was released on 11 February 2013 as a gift during an official online competition. Soon after, the song appeared on Alizée's official YouTube account.

== Track listing ==
5
No.	Title	Lyrics	Music	Length
1.	"À cause de l'automne"	Thomas Boulard	Pete Russell	3:55
2.	"10 ans"	Boulard	Boulard	3:02
3.	"Je veux bien"	Christian Vié	Fred Candeille; Chloé Clerc	3:36
4.	"Mon chevalier"	Boulard	Boulard	3:04
5.	"Le dernier souffle"	Séverin	Séverin	2:51
6.	"Boxing club"	Adrien Gallo	Gallo	2:53
7.	"Jeune fille"	Boulard	Boulard	2:34
8.	"La guerre en dentelles"	Antoine Barrailler	Frédéric Large; Barrailler	4:26
9.	"Si tu es un homme"	Olivier Volovitch	Nicolas Chassagne	4:34
10.	"Happy End"	Boulard	Franck Fossey	3:36
11.	"Dans mon sac"	Boulard	Boulard	2:38
Total length:				37:09

== Personnel ==
Credits adapted from the album's liner notes.

- Artist, Vocals & Backing Vocals:
  Alizée (all songs)
- Producer: Alexandre Azaria
- Acoustic Guitar: Philipe Foiera (Mon Chevalier)
- Art Direction: Judith Fiori & Vincent Blaviel
- Cello: Jean-Pierre Bordoux, Karel Steylaerts & Liesbeth De Lombaert
- Chorus: Alizée (all songs) & Angie Cazaux Berthias (tracks: 10 Ans & Happy End)
- Copyist: Véronique Duval
- Executive Producer: Thomas Jacquet & Isabelle Baleanu Perisson
- Graphics: Twice (17)
- Masterised: Hubert Salou
- Mix:
  - Jonathan Aharonson & Nicolas Duport (10 Ans, from Le Dernier Souffle to Si tu es un Homme)
  - Jordan Kouby & Etienne Colin (Mon Chevalier, Dans Mon Sac)
  - Hubert Salou (À cause de l'automne, Je veux bien, Happy End)
- Orchestra Director: Gisèle Gérard Tolini
- Fashion Director: Yuksel
- Makeup & Hairstyle: Elise Ollivier-Wong
- Photography: Lachaussée
- Strings & Brass: Phil Delire & Camille Rousseau
- Assisted: Camille Rousseau
- Trombone: Frederik Heirman & Marc Godefroid
- Trumpet: Schepers & Serge Plume
- Violin: Cristina Constantin, Dirk Uten, Eric Baeten, Francois Grietje, Hans Vandaele, Liesbeth De Lombaert, Marc Steylaerts, Patrick Heselmans, Teresa Heidel & Veronique Gilis
