= Clara veut la Lune =

Single by Alain Chamfort featuring Alizée

from the album Elles & Lui
- Released: April 10, 2012
- Genre: Electropop
- Length: 3:08
- Label: Fontana, Mercury Music Group
- Songwriters: Alain Chamfort, Jacques Duvall
- Producers: Jean-Pierre Pilot, William Rousseau, Olivier Schulteis

Alain Chamfort Singles singles chronology
"Bambou (feat. Camelia Jordana" (2012)	"Clara veut la Lune" (2012)

Alizée singles chronology
"Limelight" (2010)	"Clara veut la Lune" (2012)	"À cause de l'automne" (2012)

"Clara veut la Lune" (Clara wants the Moon) is the third single from the album Elles & Lui by the French singer Alain Chamfort featuring French recording artist Alizée. The single is a re-release of the same song in celebration of Chamfort's career.

== Composition ==
"Clara veut la Lune" contains the same lyric as the original song but with a very Electro rhythm style of music, referring to the more powerful tone of the earlier and the lighter vocal touch of the latter version. The song was produced by Olivier Schulteis, Jean-pierre Pilot and William Rousseau, and written by Alain Chamfort and Jacques Duvall.

== Release history ==
Country	Date	Format	Label
France	28 May 2012	Single Album	Mercury Records
Europe	28 May 2012	Single Album	Mercury Records

== See also ==
- Alain Chamfort
