= Platinum Blonde =

Platinum blonde is a color of blonde hair.

Platinum Blonde may also refer to:

- Platinum Blonde (band), a Canadian new wave music band, popular in the 1980s
  - Platinum Blonde (EP), their 1983 debut EP
- Platinum Blonde (film), a 1931 film starring Loretta Young
- "Platinum Blonde" (song), song by Blondie
- "Platinum Blonde", instrumental by Supergroove, released in the 1994 album Great Mixes
- Platinum Blonde (cocktail), an infused cocktail made of vodka

== See also ==
- "Platinum Blonde Life", a song by No Doubt from Rock Steady
- Platinum (disambiguation)
- Blonde (disambiguation)
- Blond (disambiguation)
