= Ghost Beach =

Ghost Beach may refer to:

- Ghost Beach (Goosebumps), the 1994 22nd volume of the Goosebumps children's book series by R. L. Stine
- Ghost Beach (band), American electronic music duo
- "Ghost Beach", a Hollywood Undead song from the 2017 album Five
