= L'Impermanence =

L'impermanence

Studio album by Alain Chamfort
- Released: 22 March 2024
- Genre: Pop; Chanson française
- Label: Sony, Tessland
- Producer: Johan Dalgaard; Para One; Sébastien Tellier

Alain Chamfort chronology
Le désordre des choses (2018)	L'impermanence (2024)	Temps forts (2025)

Singles from Désobéissance
- 1. "La grâce" Released: 2024; 2. "En beauté" Released: 2024; 3. "Tout s'arrange à la fin (rework)" Released: 2024

L'Impermanence (English: The Impermanence) is the 16th and final studio album by Alain Chamfort. It was released on 22 March 2022 by Sony BMG France.

The album was preceded in January 2024 by the EP Alain Chamfort produit par Sébastien Tellier, one song of which appears on this album.

The album reached the top 20 in France and the top 10 in Belgium. During an interview with Maud Berthomier, Alain Chamfort confirmed that the sales of the album were around 20,000 copies.

The album was nominated at the Victoires de la Musique.

== Track listing ==
All tracks are written by Alain Chamfort and Pierre-Dominique Burgaud, except where noted.

L'impermanence
No.	Title	Writer(s)	Producer(s)	Length
1.	"L'apocalypse heureuse"	Alain Chamfort; Pierre-Dominique Burgaud; Arnold Turboust	Johan Dalgaard; Benjamin Lebeau	4:49
2.	"Dans mes yeux"		Dalgaard; Lebeau	3:26
3.	"Vanité vanité"			3:34
4.	"Par inadvertance"			3:54
5.	"Altiplano"			3:01
6.	"À l'aune"		Para One	3:56
7.	"En beauté"			3:19
8.	"Whisky Glace" (with Sébastien Tellier)	Chamfort; Tellier		3:48
9.	"L'impermanence"			3:48
10.	"Tout s'arrange à la fin"	Chamfort; Jacques Duvall	Dalgaard; Régis Ceccarelli	3:12
11.	"La grâce"		Dalgaard, Para One	4:01
