= Perfect Imperfection (Eric Cantona album) =

Studio album by Éric Cantona
- Released: March 13, 2026
- Recorded: 2024–2025
- Genre: Alternative, chanson, spoken word
- Label: Barclay, Universal Music France
- Producer: Johan Dalgaard

Éric Cantona chronology
Cantona Sings Eric (2024)	Perfect Imperfection (2026)

Perfect Imperfection is the debut studio album by French artist, actor, and former footballer Éric Cantona. Released on March 13, 2026, through Barclay Records and Universal Music France, it is his first full-length studio project following the 2024 live album Cantona Sings Eric.

== Background and recording ==
Produced by Danish musician Johan Dalgaard, the album marks Cantona's transition from live performances to a structured studio environment. Cantona described the creative process as a pursuit of "instinct and the present moment," aiming to build a personal musical world independent of his previous careers. He emphasized a desire for artistic anonymity, noting in interviews that he sometimes considers using a pseudonym to separate his musical identity from his sporting legacy.

== Musical style ==
The album's sound is rooted in alternative rock and the French Chanson tradition, heavily utilizing spoken word and "talk-singing." Critics have highlighted Cantona's weathered, gravelly vocal timbre, drawing frequent comparisons to Serge Gainsbourg, Tom Waits, and Arthur H. The instrumentation is minimalist and atmospheric, featuring melancholic piano arrangements and jazz-influenced percussion.

== Track listing ==
All tracks written by Éric Cantona.

Side A
No.	Title	Length
1.	"Avoir Le Choix"
2.	"On Se Love"
3.	"Let's Hope"
4.	"Perfect Imperfection"
5.	"Droigts"
6.	"Les Déchirures"
8.	"We'll Believe In Ourselves"
9.	"Que Je Travestis"
10.	"We Drive"
11.	"Of The Sun"
12.	"À La Gorge Des Loups"

== Personnel ==
- Éric Cantona – vocals, lyrics
- Johan Dalgaard – keyboards, production
- Gaëtan Roussel – acoustic guitar
- Sarah deCourcy – string arrangements
