= À cause de l'automne =

Single by Alizée

from the album 5
- Released: 4 July 2012
- Recorded: 2012
- Genre: French pop
- Length: 3:55
- Label: Jive Epic
- Songwriters: Pete Russell, Thomas Boulard
- Producer: Alexandre Azaria

Alizée singles chronology
"Clara veut la Lune" (2012)	"À cause de l'automne" (2012)	"Je veux bien" (2013)

"À cause de l'automne"
- The second version of the cover art for "À cause de l'automne" was released along the release of the official music video.

Music video
- "Alizée - A cause de l'automne (Clip officiel)" on YouTube

"À cause de l'automne" (English: "Because of Autumn") is the first single from the French recording artist Alizée's album 5. The single was pre-released on 28 June 2012 at 17:00 French time (CET) directly on Alizée's official website. The single was released on French iTunes and French Amazon.fr on 4 July 2012, and also on iTunes and in e-music stores around the world. Some download platforms list 6 July 2012 as the release date. The first public performance of the song was on RFM radio on 21 December 2012 where she sang the song in a live broadcast.

On 6 October 2018 a cover version by Lowrence Fitz was released.

== Composition ==
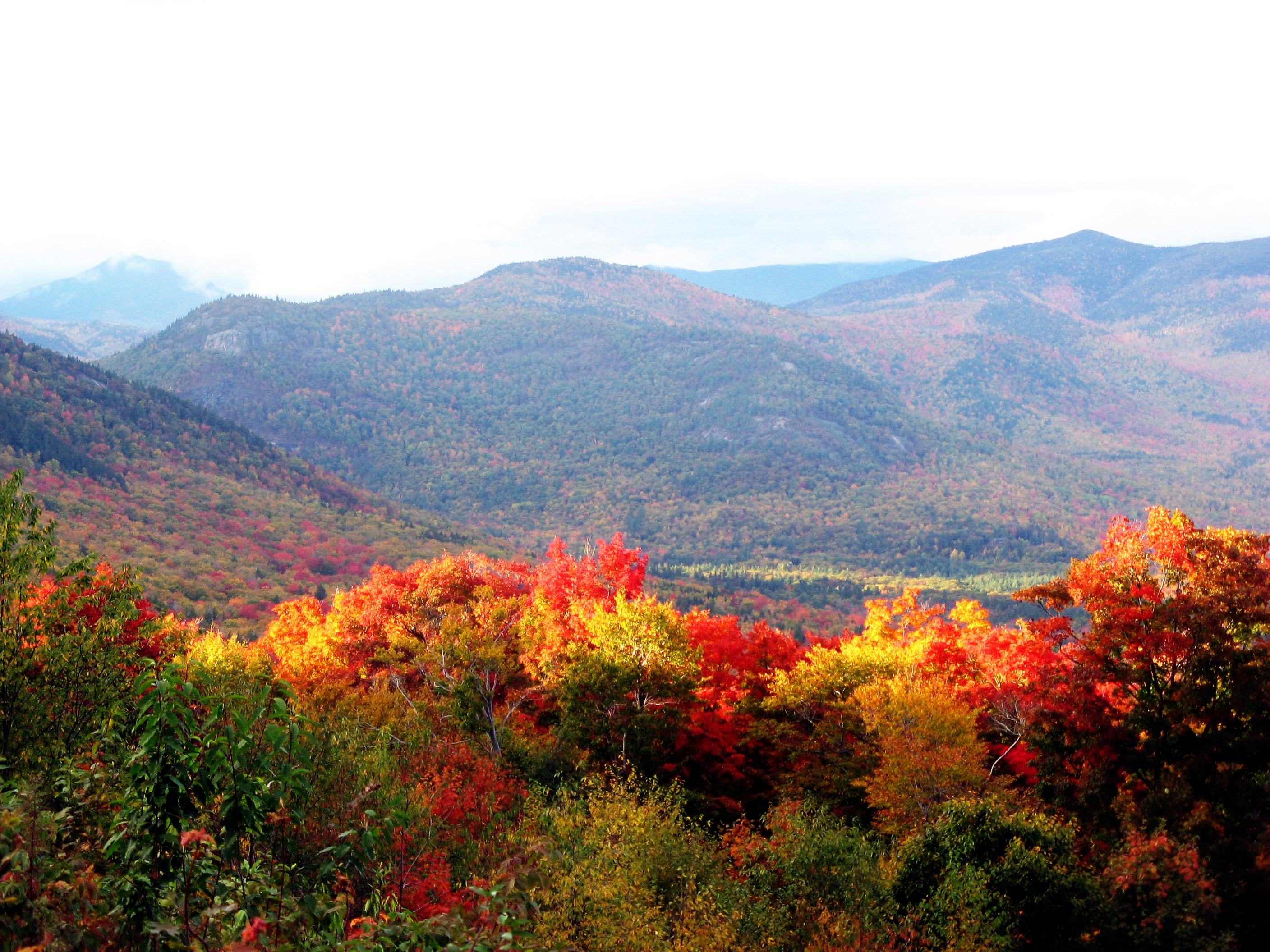
The song was inspired by the autumn.

The original song was in English and titled Never Again and was written by Pete Russell, a British songwriter based in Liverpool. The original song came from DWB Music and when accepted by Sony Music Entertainment for Alizée's new single, Sony had the lyrics re-written by Thomas Boulard in French with the new title but retaining the original music.

== Release ==
The pre-release of the single was divided in four phases, announced by Alizée. First, a video was released on Jive Epic's YouTube channel, with Alizée herself on the video in the studio. The second phase was to release video on Dailymotion channel announcing "Live Chat" with Alizée. Questions to Alizée were possible to send via e-mail, Facebook and Twitter. Third phase was announcement during "Live Chat" of the release of the single on the following day (28 June 2012). Fourth phase was the actual pre-release, exclusively for those who subscribed to the newsletter on Alizée's official website. The final release in France was 4 July 2012 on iTunes.

On the day after the pre-release, the cover art was revealed on Instagram and soon afterwards in various social media sites, also announcing the world-wide release of the single during the course of the following week.

== Music video ==
The first music video was shot on 15 July 2012 in Corsica, directed by Laurent Darmon. On 18 September, the music video was leaked out through PlayStation 3's VidZone. The following day, Jive Epic announced on Twitter that the leaked video is not the "official clip" of the song and that the official video would be released in late October. Jive Epic and SME removed the original music video from all their streaming websites.

In mid-October 2012, Sony announced that the second video will be filmed during early November. The new version of the music video was finally filmed on 30 October 2012 in Paris. The video was directed by Arnaud Delord, the producer was Léo Hinstin and Alizée's make-up was done by Bilitis Poirier. Originally scheduled to be launched on 6 December, the music video was released on Alizée's VEVO YouTube channel on 5 December 2012.

== Reception ==
Professional ratings
Review scores
Source	Rating
RFM (customer value)	5/5 stars
Charts in France	(very positive)

The song received positive feedback from foreign radio stations worldwide.

== Charts ==
Chart (2012)	Peak Position
French Singles Chart	131
French International Download Singles Chart	1
Russian Radio Play	43
