= HMS Blonde =

Eleven ships of the Royal Navy have borne the name HMS Blonde:

- HMS Blonde (1760) was a 32-gun fifth-rate frigate. A British squadron under Captain John Elliot in HMS Aeolus met a French squadron under Captain François Thurot in the Maréchal de Belle-Isle on 24 February 1760. In the action, the British captured Maréchal de Belle-Isle (after Thurot was killed), Terpsichore, and Blonde. The Royal Navy took the latter two into service; Blonde was wrecked in May 1782 off Nova Scotia.
- HMS Blonde (1783) was a 32-gun fifth rate believed to have been launched in 1783. Little is known of her, and she may have been cancelled or renamed.
- HMS Blonde (1787) was a 32-gun fifth rate launched in 1787 and used as a troopship from 1798, before being sold in 1805. Because Blonde served in the navy's Egyptian campaign between 8 March 1801 and 2 September, her officers and crew qualified for the clasp "Egypt" to the Naval General Service Medal that the Admiralty issued in 1847 to all surviving claimants.
- Blonde was a French corvette launched in 1781 that HMS Latona and HMS Phaeton (1782) captured in 1793. The Royal Navy took her into service as the 28-gun sixth rate HMS Blonde. She was sold in 1794 and became a whaling ship that a French privateer captured in 1796.
- HMS Blonde was previously HMS Hebe, a 38-gun fifth rate captured from the French in 1782. She was renamed HMS Blonde in 1805 and was broken up in 1811.
- HMS Blonde was to have been a 36-gun fifth rate, but she was renamed HMS Ister in 1812 before being launched in 1813.
- HMS Blonde (1819) was a 46-gun fifth rate launched in 1819. She was used for harbour service from 1850 and was renamed HMS Calypso in 1870, before being sold in 1895. She is mainly known for her 1824 trip to Hawaii, returning the bodies of King Kamehameha II and Queen Kamāmalu, who both had died during a trip to London.
- HMS Blonde was to have been an Ister-class wooden screw frigate. She was laid down in 1860 but was cancelled in 1863.
- HMS Blonde was to have been an armoured frigate, but she was renamed HMS Shah in 1873 before being launched later that year.
- HMS Blonde (1889) was a Barracouta-class third-class protected cruiser launched in 1889 and sold in 1905.
- HMS Blonde (1910) was a Blonde-class scout cruiser launched in 1910 and sold in 1920.
- The 'blonde' submarines of the 1950s, HMS Explorer and HMS Excalibur, acquired this nickname from their use of High-Test Peroxide as a fuel, and its related use as a hair bleach.
