= Tigirlily Gold =

American country music duo

- Also known as: Tigirlily
- Origin: Hazen, North Dakota, U.S.
- Genre: Country
- Years active: 2014–present
- Labels: Monument; Sony Music Nashville
- Members: Kendra Slaubaugh; Krista Slaubaugh

Tigirlily Gold, originally known as Tigirlily, is an American country music duo from North Dakota. The duo consists of sisters Kendra and Krista Slaubaugh.

== History ==
Sisters Kendra and Krista Slaubaugh are natives of Hazen, North Dakota. The two began performing music as teenagers and crediting themselves as Tigirlily. The two also uploaded cover songs to YouTube before moving to Nashville, Tennessee, in 2017 to attend Belmont University. After graduating, they uploaded cover songs to TikTok during the COVID-19 pandemic, which led to them receiving attention on social media. Songwriter and record producer Shane McAnally discovered the duo and signed them to the Nashville branch of Monument Records, of which he was a co-owner. Monument released their self-titled EP in 2021. Also at this point, they began performing at a Nashville bar owned by Dierks Bentley, and changed their name to Tigirlily Gold.

In 2023, the duo released a second EP titled Blonde, which includes their debut radio single "Shoot Tequila", which peaked at number 47 on Billboard Country Airplay. The duo released "I Tried a Ring On" as their second radio single in January 2024, and announced the release of their debut studio album, Blonde for July 26, 2024.

Tigirlily Gold won New Duo or Group of the Year at the 59th Academy of Country Music Awards in 2024, only the second female duo to ever win the award, following The Kinleys in 1998.

On February 24, 2025, Tigirlily Gold released "Forever from Here" as the lead single from their second studio album. It pulled in 93 radio adds in its first week, making it the most added song at country radio, and debuted at number 60 on the Billboard Country Airplay chart the following week.

Following the closure of Monument Records in April 2025, Tigirlily Gold moved to Sony Music Nashville.

In May 2025, Krista became engaged to Walker Montgomery, the son of John Michael Montgomery.

On July 24, 2026, the duo announced their second album, Country & Midwestern, which was released on October 9.

== Discography ==
=== Studio albums ===
List of studio albums, with selected details
Title	Details
Blonde	Released: July 26, 2024; Label: Monument; Format: CD, digital download
Country & Midwestern	Released: October 9, 2026; Label: Sony Music Nashville; Format: CD, digital download

=== Extended plays ===
- Tigirlily (2021)
- Blonde (2023)

=== Singles ===
List of singles, with selected chart positions
Title	Year	Peak positions	Album
Title	Year	US Country Airplay	Album
"Shoot Tequila"	2023	47	Blonde
"I Tried a Ring On"	2024	39	Blonde
"Forever from Here"	2025	54	Country & Midwestern

== Awards and nominations ==
Year	Awards	Recipient/Work	Category	Result	Ref.
2024	CMT Music Awards	"Shoot Tequila" (Tigirlily Gold)	Group/Duo Video of the Year	Nominated	
2024	CMT Music Awards	"Shoot Tequila" (Tigirlily Gold)	Breakthrough Female Video of the Year	Nominated	
2024	Academy of Country Music Awards	Tigirlily Gold	New Duo or Group of the Year	Won	
