= Blonde (Alizée song) =

Single by Alizée

from the album Blonde
- Released: 18 March 2014
- Recorded: 2014
- Genre: French pop; dance-pop
- Label: Jive; Epic
- Songwriters: Lionel Florence; Franck Deweare; Pascal Obispo; Laurent Konrad
- Producer: Pascal Obispo

Alizée singles chronology
"Je veux bien" (2013)	"Blonde" (2014)	"Alcaline" (2014)

Music video
- "Alizée - Blonde (Clip officiel)" on YouTube

"Blonde" is a French language song, and the first single from Alizée's album Blonde which was released on 23 June 2014. On 14 March 2014, Alizée and Sony France confirmed on Facebook the release of the single to be 18 March 2014. Also the cover art was again put online. A small extract of the single came available online on 16 March 2014. The single had worldwide release on iTunes on 18 March 2014.

== Background ==
The song was proposed to Alizée by Pascal Obispo after their earlier conversation about Alizée telling him that she would like to bleach her hair. Pascal told her that he would have a song to match her hair if she'd be interested. Alizée went and bleached her hair and the single was released.

== Promotion ==
On the released date, 18 March 2014, Alizée spent most of the day giving interviews in several radio stations, including RFM, MFM, France Bleu, Hotmix Radio and NRJ.

== Release ==
The single was released on 18 March 2014. The release happened on iTunes, Deezer and Spotify. Also the single was sent to radio stations, where they began radio play on the same date. The single was announced 14 March 2014 by Jive Epic France and Alizée on Facebook. In the first week the single was able to reach 63rd place on the official French single chart. It is the best single chart position for Alizée since Mademoiselle Juliette (2007) and À contre-courant (2003), which both reached 22nd place.

== Video ==
The casting of dancers for the video was held 2 April 2014 in Paris. The music video was shot on 12 April 2014.

== Charts ==
Chart (2014)	Peak position
France (SNEP)	63
