= Alain Chamfort (album) =

2015 album by Alain Chamfort

Studio album by Alain Chamfort
- Studios: Studio Ferber; Studio Question de son
- Genres: Variété française Pop
- Language: French
- Label: PIAS
- Producer: Frédéric Lo

Alain Chamfort chronology
Elles & Lui (2012)	Alain Chamfort (2015)	Le meilleur d'Alain Chamfort (2016)

Singles from Alain Chamfort
- 1. "Joy" Released: 2015; 2. "Concours de circonstances" Released: 2015

Alain Chamfort is the 14th studio album by Alain Chamfort, released on 13 April 2015.

The album reached the top 20 in France and the top 15 in Belgium and sold around 15,000 copies in France.

== Track listing ==
All tracks are written by Alain Chamfort and Jacques Duvall, except where noted.

Alain Chamfort track listing
No.	Title	Writer(s)	Producer(s)	Length
1.	"Deux poignards bleus"		Frédéric Lo	4:49
2.	"Ensemble"		Lo	3:26
3.	"L'amour n'est pas un sport individuel"		Lo	3:34
4.	"Joy"		Lo	3:54
5.	"Argentine"		Lo	3:01
6.	"On meurt"		Lo	3:56
7.	"Concours de circonstances"		Lo	3:19
8.	"Jamais je t'aime"	Alain Chamfort; Jacques Duvall; Frédéric Lo	Lo	3:48
9.	"Puis-je vous offrir ?"	Chamfort; Duvall; Benoît Courti	Lo	3:48
10.	"Où es-tu ?" (with Charlotte Rampling)	Chamfort; Duvall; Lo	Lo	3:12
11.	"Le diable est une blonde"		Lo	3:12
