= HMS Blanche (1909) =

Blonde class cruiser

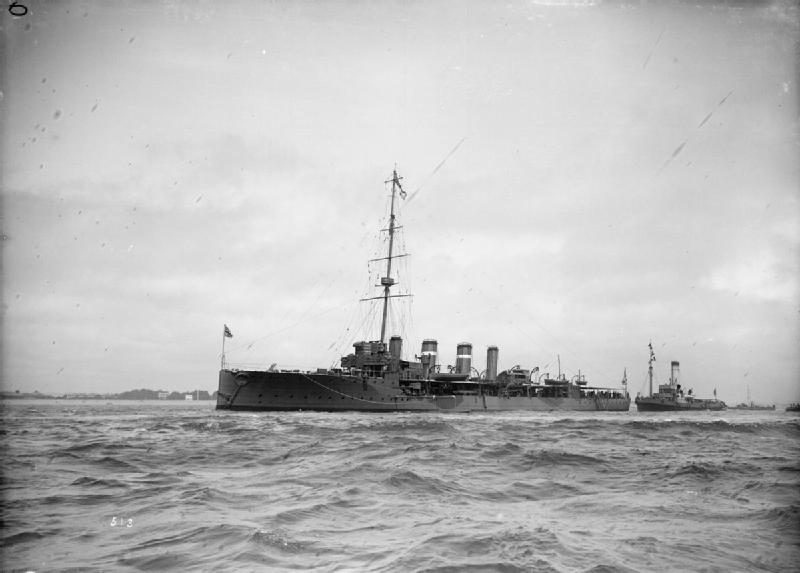
- Blanche at anchor

History

United Kingdom
- Name: HMS Blanche
- Builder: Pembroke Royal Dockyard
- Laid down: 12 April 1909
- Launched: 25 November 1909
- Completed: November 1910
- Decommissioned: 1919
- Fate: Sold for scrap, 27 July 1921

General characteristics
- Class & type: Blonde-class scout cruiser
- Displacement: 3,350 long tons (3,400 t) (normal)
- Length: 406 ft (123.7 m) (o/a)
- Beam: 41 ft 6 in (12.6 m)
- Draught: 14 ft 3 in (4.3 m)
- Installed power: 18,000 shp (13,000 kW); 12 × Yarrow boilers
- Propulsion: 4 × shafts; 4 × Parsons steam turbines
- Speed: 25 knots (46 km/h; 29 mph)
- Complement: 317
- Armament: 10 × single BL 4-inch (102 mm) guns; 4 × single QF 3-pounder 47 mm (1.9 in) guns; 2 × single 21-inch (530 mm) torpedo tubes
- Armour: Deck: .5–1 in (13–25 mm); Conning Tower: 4 in (102 mm)

HMS Blanche was the second of two Blonde-class scout cruisers built for the Royal Navy in the first decade of the 20th century. She led the 1st Destroyer Flotilla from completion until 1912 and was then briefly transferred to the 4th Destroyer Flotilla before the ship was assigned to the 3rd Battle Squadron in 1913. During World War I, Blanche was assigned to several different battleship squadrons of the Grand Fleet. She was present at, but did not fight in, the Battle of Jutland in mid-1916. The ship was converted into a minelayer in early 1917 and made 16 sorties to lay mines during the war. Blanche was paid off in 1919 and sold for scrap in 1921.

== Design and description ==
Designed to provide destroyer flotillas with a command ship capable of outclassing enemy destroyers with her 10 four-inch (102 mm) guns, Blanche proved too slow in service from the start of her career. Her 25-knot (46 km/h; 29 mph) speed was inadequate to match the 27-to-30-knot (50 to 56 km/h; 31 to 35 mph) speeds of the destroyers she led in her flotilla.

Displacing 3,350 long tons (3,400 t), the ship had an overall length of 406 feet (123.7 m), a beam of 41 feet 6 inches (12.6 m) and a deep draught of 14 feet 3 inches (4.3 m). She was powered by four Parsons steam turbines, each driving one shaft. The turbines produced a total of 18,000 indicated horsepower (13,000 kW), using steam produced by 12 Yarrow boilers, and gave a maximum speed of 25 knots (46 km/h; 29 mph). She carried a maximum of 780 long tons (790 t) of coal and 189 long tons (192 t) of fuel oil. Her crew consisted of 314 officers and ratings.

Her main armament consisted of 10 breech-loading (BL) four-inch Mk VII guns. The forward pair of guns were mounted side by side on a platform on the forecastle, three pairs were port and starboard amidships, and the two remaining guns were on the centreline of the quarterdeck, one ahead of the other. The guns fired their 31-pound (14 kg) shells to a range of about 11,400 yards (10,400 m). Her secondary armament was four quick-firing (QF) three-pounder 47 mm (1.9 in) Vickers Mk I guns and two submerged 21-inch (530 mm) torpedo tubes.

As a scout cruiser, the ship was only lightly protected to maximise her speed. She had a curved protective deck that was one inch (25 mm) thick on the slope and .5 inches (13 mm) on the flat. Her conning tower was protected by four inches of armour.

== Construction and service ==
Blanche, the seventh ship of that name, was laid down in No. 5 Slipway at Pembroke Royal Dockyard by Mrs. Munday, wife of Captain Godfrey Mundy, Captain-Superintendent of the dockyard, on 12 April 1909. The ship was launched on 25 November 1909 by Lady Mai Philipps, wife of Sir Owen Philips, Member of Parliament for Pembroke and Haverfordwest. She was completed in November 1910 and served as the flotilla leader of the First Destroyer Flotilla through 1912. On 14 August 1911, the cruiser took part in practice with the flotilla. During the night of 2 October, the ship struck a rock on the Pentland Skerries and suffered damage to her bow and stern. Captain Wilfred Henderson assumed command of the ship and the Fourth Destroyer Flotilla of the First Fleet on 1 May 1912. Blanche had been transferred to the Third Battle Squadron as of 18 June 1913 and Captain Richard Hyde assumed command on 5 July. Blanche patrolled off the Irish coast in early 1914, during the Home Rule Crisis.

She was still assigned to the 3rd Battle Squadron of the Grand Fleet in Scapa Flow at the start of World War I. On 15 December the ship was badly damaged due to severe weather in the Pentland Firth as she sortied to intercept German ships bombarding ports in Yorkshire and had to return to port for repairs. Blanche was transferred to the Fourth Battle Squadron, joining her sister ship, Blonde, in January 1916. On 28 February, she was one of three cruisers dispatched to patrol off the Norwegian coast during the hunt for the German raider SMS Greif, although she did not come into contact with the German ship before she was sunk. Captain John Casement relieved Hyde on 21 May. During the Battle of Jutland, she was assigned to a position at the rear of the squadron during the battle and did not fire her guns. By January 1917, Blanche was detached from the Grand Fleet, presumably to be converted into a minelayer and Casement was relieved by Captain The Honourable Reginald Plunkett-Ernle-Erle-Drax on 15 January. The ship had been assigned to the Fifth Battle Squadron by April. Blanche laid mines at the entrance to the Kattegat on the nights of 18/19 and 24/25 February 1918, part of her total of 1,238 mines laid during 16 sorties during the war. Captain Francis Buller assumed command in lieu of Plunkett-Ernle-Erle-Drax on 5 April 1918. He, in turn, was relieved by Captain Charles Wrightson on 7 January 1919. The ship was still assigned to the Fifth Battle Squadron in February, but had been assigned to the Nore Reserve by 1 May, together with Blonde. The sisters were listed for sale by 18 March 1920 and Blanche was sold to Fryer for scrap on 27 July 1921 and broken up at Sunderland.

== Bibliography ==
- Colledge, J. J.; Warlow, Ben (2006) [1969]. Ships of the Royal Navy: The Complete Record of All Fighting Ships of the Royal Navy from the 15th Century to the Present (3rd Rev ed.). London: Chatham Publishing. ISBN 978-1-86176-281-8. OCLC 67375475.
- Corbett, Julian (March 1997). Naval Operations to the Battle of the Falklands. History of the Great War: Based on Official Documents. Vol. I (2nd, reprint of the 1938 ed.). London and Nashville, Tennessee: Imperial War Museum and Battery Press. ISBN 0-89839-256-X.
- Corbett, Julian (1997). Naval Operations. History of the Great War: Based on Official Documents. Vol. II (reprint of the 1929 second ed.). London and Nashville, Tennessee: Imperial War Museum in association with the Battery Press. ISBN 1-870423-74-7.
- Corbett, Julian (1997). Naval Operations. History of the Great War: Based on Official Documents. Vol. III (reprint of the 1940 second ed.). London and Nashville, Tennessee: Imperial War Museum in association with the Battery Press. ISBN 1-870423-50-X.
- Friedman, Norman (2009). British Destroyers From Earliest Days to the Second World War. Annapolis, Maryland: Naval Institute Press. ISBN 978-1-59114-081-8.
- Friedman, Norman (2011). Naval Weapons of World War One. Barnsley, South Yorkshire, UK: Seaforth. ISBN 978-1-84832-100-7.
- Goldrick, James (2015). Before Jutland: The Naval War in Northern European Waters, August 1914–February 1915. Annapolis, Maryland: Naval Institute Press. ISBN 978-1-59114-349-9.
- Massie, Robert K. (2004). Castles of Steel: Britain, Germany, and the Winning of the Great War at Sea. London: Jonathan Cape. ISBN 0-224-04092-8.
- Phillips, Lawrie (2014). Pembroke Dockyard and the Old Navy: A Bicentennial History. Stroud, Gloucestershire, UK: The History Press. ISBN 978-0-7509-5214-9.
- Preston, Antony (1985). "Great Britain and Empire Forces". In Gardiner, Robert & Gray, Randal (eds.). Conway's All the World's Fighting Ships 1906–1921. Annapolis, Maryland: Naval Institute Press. pp. 1–104. ISBN 0-85177-245-5.
- Smith, Peter C. (2005). Into the Minefields: British Destroyer Minelaying 1916 - 1960. Barnsley, UK: Pen & Sword Maritime. ISBN 1-84415-271-5.
