= Le Désordre des choses =

Le désordre des choses

Studio album by Alain Chamfort
- Released: 20 April 2018
- Genres: Pop; Chanson française
- Label: PIAS
- Producers: Johan Dalgaard; Frédéric Lo; Yan Wagner

Alain Chamfort chronology
Versions revisitées (2016)	Le désordre des choses (2018)	L'Impermanence (2024)

Singles from Le désordre des choses
- 1. "Exister" Released: 2018; 2. "Tout est pop" Released: 2018; 3. "Les microsillons" Released: 2018; 4. "En attendant" Released: 2018; 5. "Le désordre des choses" Released: 2018; 6. "Linoleum" Released: 2019

Le Désordre des choses (English: Disorder of Things) is the 15th studio album by Alain Chamfort, released on 20 April 2018 by PIAS.

It is mainly produced by Johan Dalgaard. Lyrics are written by Pierre-Dominique Burgaud, with music by Chamfort.

The album was nominated at the Victoires de la Musique. The album reached the top 50 in France and Switzerland and the top 10 in Belgium.

== Track listing ==
All tracks are written by Alain Chamfort and Pierre-Dominique Burgaud, except where noted.

Le désordre des choses track listing
No.	Title	Writer(s)	Producer(s)	Length
1.	"Les microsillons"		Johan Dalgaard; Frédéric Lo	4:49
2.	"Le désordre des choses"		Dalgaard; Lo	3:26
3.	"Exister"			3:34
4.	"Tout est pop"			3:54
5.	"En attendant"	Chamfort; Lo		3:01
6.	"Les salamandres"			3:56
7.	"En regardant la mer"			3:19
8.	"Sans haine ni violence"			3:48
9.	"Palmyre"			3:48
10.	"Linoleum"		Dalgaard; Yan Wagner	3:12
