= Theodore Hallett =

Royal Navy Vice Admiral (1878-1956)

Vice-Admiral Sir Theodore Hallett KBE CB
- Born: 10 January 1878; Priors Hardwick, Warwickshire
- Died: 16 December 1956 (aged 78)
- Military career
- Allegiance: United Kingdom
- Branch: Royal Navy
- Service years: 1894 – 1933; 1939 – 1945
- Rank: Vice-Admiral
- Commands: HMS Blonde; HMS Chatham; HMS Southampton; HMS Repulse; Coast of Scotland
- Conflicts: World War I
- Awards: Knight Commander of the Order of the British Empire; Companion of the Order of the Bath

Vice-Admiral Sir Theodore John Hallett KBE CB (10 January 1878 – 16 December 1956) was a Royal Navy officer who became Commander-in-Chief, Coast of Scotland.

== Naval career ==
Hallett joined the Royal Navy as a midshipman in 1894. He was promoted to the rank of lieutenant on 31 December 1899, and on 15 February 1900 was lent to HMS Edgar for duty on voyage to Hong Kong, where he was appointed to serve in HMS Phoenix, recommissioned for the China station.

He served in the First World War as Commanding Officer of the light cruisers HMS Blonde and HMS Chatham, in the latter serving as Flag Captain of the 3rd Light Cruiser Squadron.

He went on to be Naval Assistant to the Second Sea Lord in 1922, Captain of the Fleet for the Mediterranean Fleet in 1924 and Commander-in-Chief, Coast of Scotland in 1929. He was then appointed Aide-de-Camp to the King and retired in 1933.

He was recalled during the Second World War to serve as a beachmaster for the Dunkirk evacuation in June 1940 and then became Commandant of the Combined Operations Training Centre in October 1940. He later saw action as a member of the expeditionary force to Narvik in Norway in 1942.

== Family ==
In 1908, he married Helen Blanche Dalkeyne; they had two children.

Military offices
Preceded by John Cameron	Commander-in-Chief, Coast of Scotland; 1929–1931	Succeeded by William Leveson-Gower
