= Blonde (Tigirlily Gold album) =

Studio album by Tigirlily Gold
- Released: July 26, 2024
- Genre: Country
- Length: 34:09
- Label: Monument
- Producer: Pete Good; Alex Kline

Singles from Blonde
- 1. "Shoot Tequila" Released: March 6, 2023; 2. "I Tried a Ring On" Released: January 22, 2024

Blonde is the debut studio album by American country music duo Tigirlily Gold. It was released on July 26, 2024, through Monument. It includes the singles "Shoot Tequila" and "I Tried a Ring On".

== Content ==
Kendra and Krista Slaugbaugh of Tigirlily Gold co-wrote eight of the 10 tracks on Blonde, selected from an estimated 40 to 60 songs the duo had written for the record. Pete Good produced tracks 2, 6, 7, and 8, while Alex Kline produced tracks 1, 3, 4, 5, and 9, with the two co-producing the album's tenth and final track, a cover of Leona Lewis' "Bleeding Love". Krista described the album as "all about being undeniably and unapologetically yourself", while Kendra said she "[hopes] listeners feel like they could hang out with us on a Friday night or have a heart-to-heart on a Sunday morning, that every emotion you feel is valid, that some nights you want to go shoot tequila and some nights you want to cry over a boy who shattered you. At the end of the day, no one has it all together, and we're all figuring out how to navigate love, loss, friends, memories, self-love, confidence".

The album was preceded by the release of an EP, also titled Blonde, in June 2023. "Shoot Tequila" and "I Tried a Ring On" were released as the album's first and second singles, respectively. "Shoot Tequila" reached a peak of number 47 on the Billboard Country Airplay chart, while "I Tried a Ring On" became the duo's first top 40 hit on the chart. "Leroy" was also issued as a promotional single alongside the album's announcement.

== Track listing ==
Blonde track listing
No.	Title	Writer(s)	Producer	Length
1.	"Blonde"	Kendra Slaubaugh; Krista Slaubaugh; Alex Kline; Scott Stepakoff	Alex Kline	3:22
2.	"Leroy"	Nora Collins; Jessie Jo Dillon; Forest Glen Whitehead	Pete Good	3:27
3.	"Hometown Song"	Kendra Slaubaugh; Krista Slaubaugh; Kline; Stepakoff	Kline	3:46
4.	"Move On"	Kendra Slaubaugh; Krista Slaubaugh; Kline; Stepakoff	Kline	3:33
5.	"End Up Us"	Kendra Slaubaugh; Krista Slaubaugh; Todd Clark; Jason Saenz	Kline	2:58
6.	"I Tried a Ring On"	Kendra Slaubaugh; Krista Slaubaugh; Pete Good; Josh Jenkins	Good	3:31
7.	"Stupid Prizes"	Kendra Slaubaugh; Krista Slaubaugh; Good; Jenkins	Good	2:57
8.	"Shoot Tequila"	Kendra Slaubaugh; Krista Slaubaugh; Kevin Griffin; David Mescon	Good	3:13
9.	"Only Once"	Kendra Slaubaugh; Krista Slaubaugh; Kline; Saenz	Kline	3:02
10.	"Bleeding Love"	Jesse McCartney; Ryan Tedder	Good; Kline	4:15
Total length:				34:09

== Charts ==
Chart performance for Blonde
Chart (2024)	Peak position
UK Album Downloads (OCC)	73
