= Blond (surname) =

Blond is a surname. Notable people with the surname include:

- Phillip Blond (born 1966), director of the UK think tank ResPublica
- Shelley Blond (born 1970), first voice actress for Lara Croft
- Susan Blond (born 1949), American publicist

== See also ==
- Bland (surname)
