= Blonde (Alizée album) =

Studio album by Alizée
- Released: 23 June 2014
- Recorded: 2013–2014
- Genre: French pop; electro-pop; dance-pop
- Length: 38:24
- Label: Sony Music

Alizée chronology
5 (2013)	Blonde (2014)

Singles from Blonde
- 1. "Blonde" Released: 18 March 2014; 2. "Alcaline" Released: 16 June 2014

Blonde (French pronunciation: [blɔnd]) is the sixth studio album by French recording artist Alizée. It was released on 23 June 2014. The first single ("Blonde") was released 18 March 2014. The album was released only one year and three months after her fifth album, 5. The speeding of the release cycle was caused by Alizée's success on French television show Danse avec les stars, which fourth season she won on 23 November 2013. The album received mixed critics and was not a commercial success.

== Background and composition ==
The development of the sixth album started in fall 2013 when it became clear that Alizée would be very successful on the French Danse avec les stars show. The first to hint of the new album was Jérémy Parayre, a French journalist working for the Télé7 Jour, who posted on Twitter on 31 October 2013 telling that Alizée is working on a new album. He received the information directly from Alizée during a photo shoot and interview for Télé7 Jour during the same day.

Alizée announced that her next album would be released spring 2014. She also posted on social media a photo of herself in a studio, recording for the new album. However, due to the busy schedule of the Danse avec les stars show, this was the only occasion on which Alizée was shown working on the album. Finally, since she won the dance show, she was not able to start working on the new album right away as she had to attend the Danse avec les stars Tour, which was held all around France and lasted over two months, until 23 February 2014. After a couple of weeks of vacation and absence from the media, on 12 March 2014, the cover art of the new album's first single was accidentally leaked on social media. This revealed that the album was still being developed. On 14 March 2014 Sony Music France confirmed the first single of the album would be released on 18 March 2014.

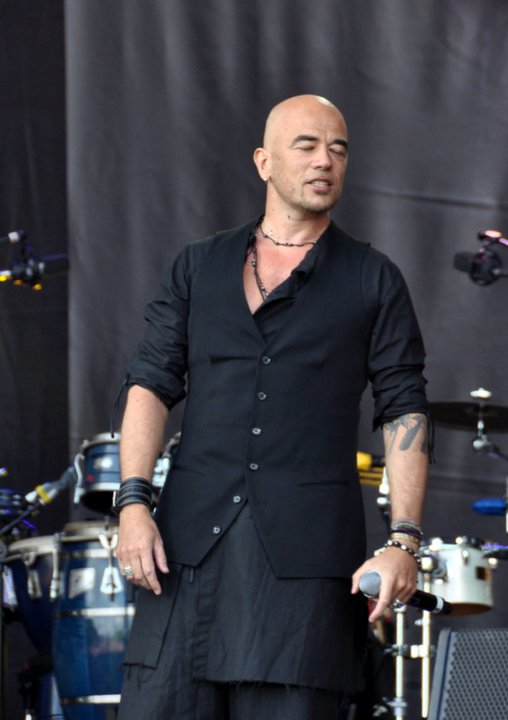
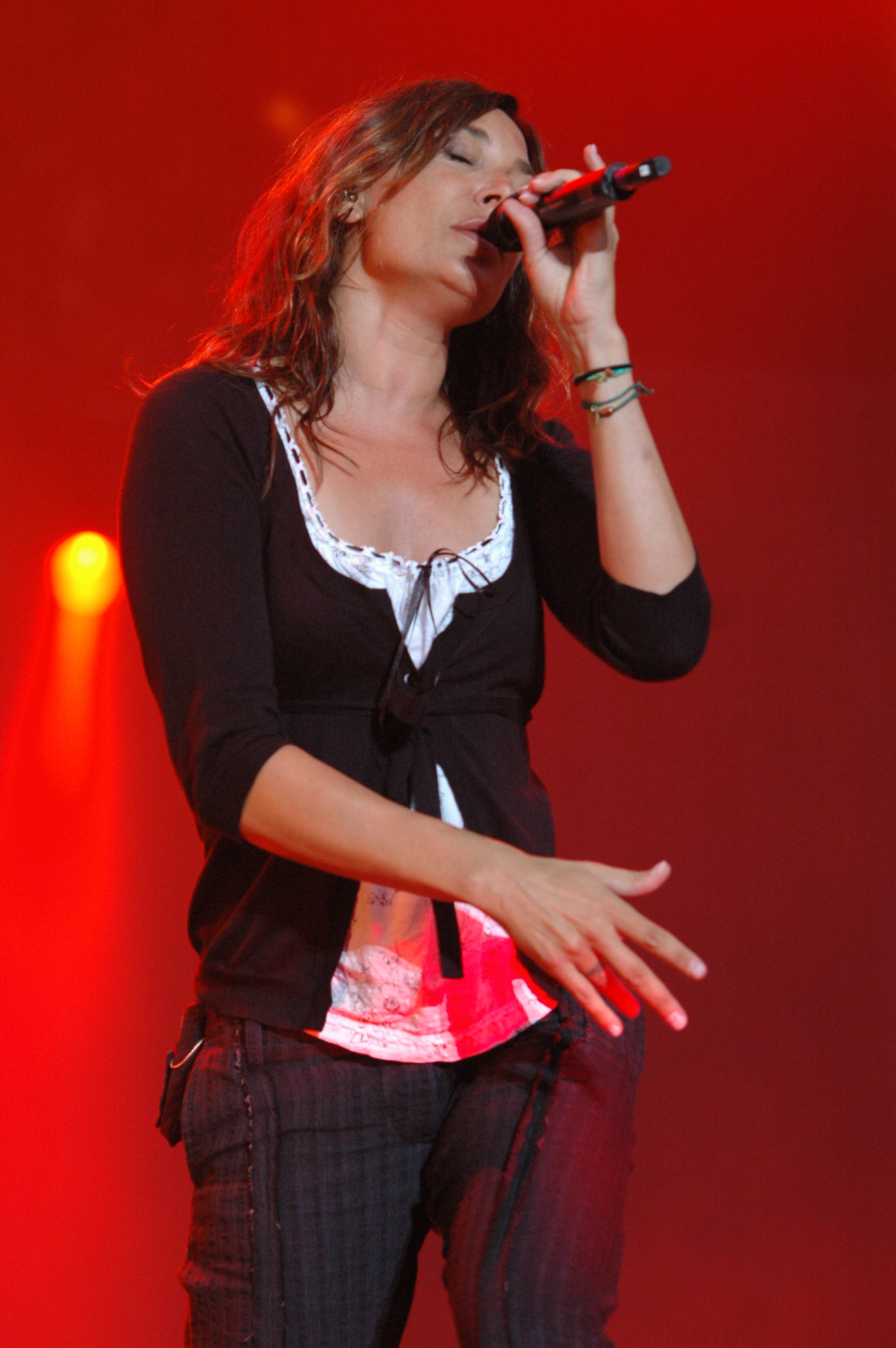
Pascal Obispo (left) and Zazie (right) are two of the principal collaborators in Alizée's album.

On 17 March 2014, Sony Music France announced the first people working on the album. The list includes Laurent Konrad, Lionel Florence, Zazie, Pierre Grillet and Pascal Obispo. The first single, "Blonde", was composed by Laurent Konrad.

During the fall 2013, it was rumored that the album would consist of cover songs but this rumor was corrected by Alizée herself telling that the album would not have cover songs and it would consist of pop songs that fits for her. There was also confusion about Alizée's saying that she would go to Japan to record song(s) in Japanese. It was thought that the new album would have Japanese songs but it was a misunderstanding. Later Alizée told that she would go to Japan to record a theme song(s) for Japanese animation, although she never did that.

== Promotion ==
On 16 May 2014, Alizée posted on Facebook announcing a competition where you could win the album, VIP ticket to concert and meeting with her. On the link to Sony Music, the name and the cover of the new album was seen first time. That would confirm the album name to be Blonde. Also, her upcoming concert tour was named Blonde tour. The pre-sale for the concert tickets took place on 19 May 2014 and wider sale of the tickets begun on 22 May 2014. After low album and ticket sales, the concert tour was cancelled.

=== Singles ===
The first single from the album is "Blonde". The release date is 18 March 2014, and the single was announced 14 March 2014.

The second single from the album is "Alcaline", which was released on 16 June 2014, one week before the release of the album.

== Track listing ==
No.	Title	Lyrics	Music	Length
1.	"Blonde"	Pascal Obispo; Franck Deweare; Lionel Florence	Laurent Konrad	3:30
2.	"K.-O."	Florence; Elodie Hesme; Obispo	Obispo; Mickaël Zibi	3:02
3.	"Alcaline"	Florence; Hesme	Konrad; Obispo	3:18
4.	"Seulement pour te plaire"	Pierre Grillet	Obispo; Curie Jetter	3:28
5.	"L'amour renfort"	Zazie	Konrad; Obispo	3:30
6.	"Bi"	Florence; Hesme	Konrad; Obispo	2:43
7.	"Mon planeur"	Grillet	Obispo; Timothée Selim Aymard; Amoria Draoua	2:57
8.	"Ce qui tue l'amour"	Grillet	Aymard; Draoua; Obispo	2:49
9.	"Tweet"	Zazie	Obispo; Mickaël Zibi	3:21
10.	"Charles est stone"	Zazie	Konrad; Obispo	2:44
11.	"Mylène Farmer"	Florence; Thomas Baroche	Jan Pham Huu Tri; Obispo; John Mamann	3:08
12.	"Plus de bye bye"	Grillet	Obispo; Mickaël Malih	3:55

== Awards and nominations ==
=== Nominations ===
La Chanson de l'année

- Chanson de l'année (Song of the year) 2014 for Blonde

== Charts ==
Chart (2014)	Peak position
Belgian Albums Chart (Wallonia)	19
France (SNEP)	20
Mexican Albums (AMPROFON)	51
