= Platinum (disambiguation) =

Platinum is a chemical element with symbol Pt and atomic number 78.

Platinum may also refer to:

== Places ==
- Platinum, Alaska, a city
- The Platinum, a condo hotel near the Las Vegas Strip

== Arts, entertainment, and media ==
=== Fictional entities ===
- Platinum, one of the Metal Men, a comic book superhero group
- Star Platinum, Jotaro Kujo's stand in JoJo's Bizarre Adventure

=== Games ===
- Platinum range, a budget package of PlayStation games now titled Essential
- Pokémon Platinum, the third installation of the fourth generation of Pokémon video games

=== Music ===
==== Groups ====
- Platinum (quartet), a barbershop quartet
- Platnum, a British vocal group

==== Albums ====
- Platinum (Casiopea album), 1987
- Platinum (Miranda Lambert album), 2014
- Platinum (Dean Miller album)
- Platinum (Mike Oldfield album), 1979
- Platinum (The Headhunters album), 2011

==== Songs ====
- "Platinum" (Maaya Sakamoto song), 1999
- "Platinum" (Snoop Dogg song), 2011

==== Other music ====
- Platinum album or platinum record, a music recording sales certification that an album or single has sold a minimum number of copies

=== Other arts, entertainment, and media ===
- Platinum (musical), a 1979 Broadway musical
- Platinum (TV series), a short-lived 2003 television series on the UPN network

== Organizations and enterprises ==
- PLATINUM (cybercrime group), an advanced persistent threat
- Platinum Asset Management, an Australian asset management company
- Platinum Studios, a US-based comic book publisher and media developer
- PlatinumGames, a Japan-based independent video game development company

== Science ==
- Isotopes of platinum
- Platinum group, a collective name used for six chemical elements in the periodic table

== Ships ==
- Platinum, a former name of the private yacht Dubai
- Platinum, a former name of the cruise ship MV Discovery

== Other uses ==
- Platinum (color), a pale greyish-white color
- Platinum (theme), a user interface theme used in Mac OS 8 and Mac OS 9
- Platinum, a precious metal commodity
- Platinum, as coinage
- Platinum Card

== See also ==
- The Platinum Collection (disambiguation)
- Pt (disambiguation)
