= Une enfant du siècle =

Studio album by Alizée
- Released: 29 March 2010
- Recorded: 2009–2010
- Studio: Plus 30 (Paris, France); Third Side Records (Paris, France); The Exchange (London, England)
- Genre: Electro-pop; French pop
- Length: 36:25
- Language: French; English; Spanish
- Label: Jive; Epic; Institutibles; Wisteria Song; Sony Music
- Producer: Château Marmont

Alizée chronology
Tout Alizée (2007)	Une enfant du siècle (2010)	5 (2013)

Singles from Une enfant du siècle
- 1. "Les collines" Released: 8 March 2010; 2. "Limelight" Released: 26 April 2010

Une enfant du siècle (in English: A Child of the Century) is the fourth studio album by the French recording artist Alizée. The first one released under Jive Records/Epic label and her first French-English-Spanish language album. The full album leaked on to the Internet on 19 March 2010. The album was released in France on 29 March 2010. The album received positive reviews from critics, who praised the radical change and collaborations, but criticized the perceived lack of enthusiasm in her singing. Respondents praised the album for its mature nature, abstract and sober, the musical direction of Alizée, calling it her "most risky record". On the same day Alizée signed autographs at Virgin Megastore in Paris. The album is inspired by and depicts the life of Edie Sedgwick.

== Background ==
The theme of the album is the life of American model Edie Sedgwick from the birth till the death, based on the style of Andy Warhol. He isn't mentioned in the lyrics but the album has many references on him.

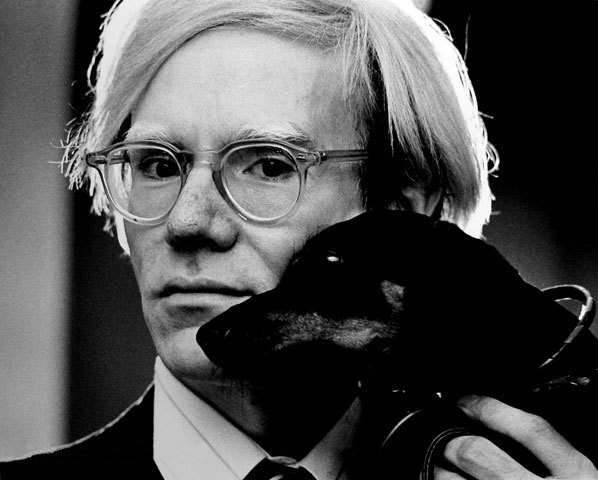
Edie Sedgwick and Andy Warhol (pictured) are the prime influences of the album.

The musical style is electropop, litmus between dark and light shades of colors fading together, outfitted with deep and abstract lyrics that make reference to the Sedgwick's life and her influence in contemporary culture since its emergence in the media, art, politics and everything encompassed her and Warhol. Sedgwick is mentioned in the lyrics and referred as Factory Girl, which could be considered to be a reference to The Factory. New York City's elite society is mentioned and in some interviews Alizée told that she also referred to the elite of France and Paris.

== Development ==
In the beginning of 2009, Alizée had to cancel a concert in France. Shortly after it she announced work on her future album, which would sound very different from all of her previous albums. It was released in France on 29 March 2010.

The album was recorded in Paris and London. British website Popjustice gave out that the first single was partially in English and it was called "Limelight". On 15 February 2010 they uploaded the full version of the song and a clip from the music video. However, it was later confirmed by Popjustice itself that "Limelight" was a teaser single, and the official single from Alizée's fourth album is "Les Collines (Never Leave You)".

The Collector's Edition of the album was made available for pre-order on 4 February 2010. It was sold only on her official website.

== Promotion ==
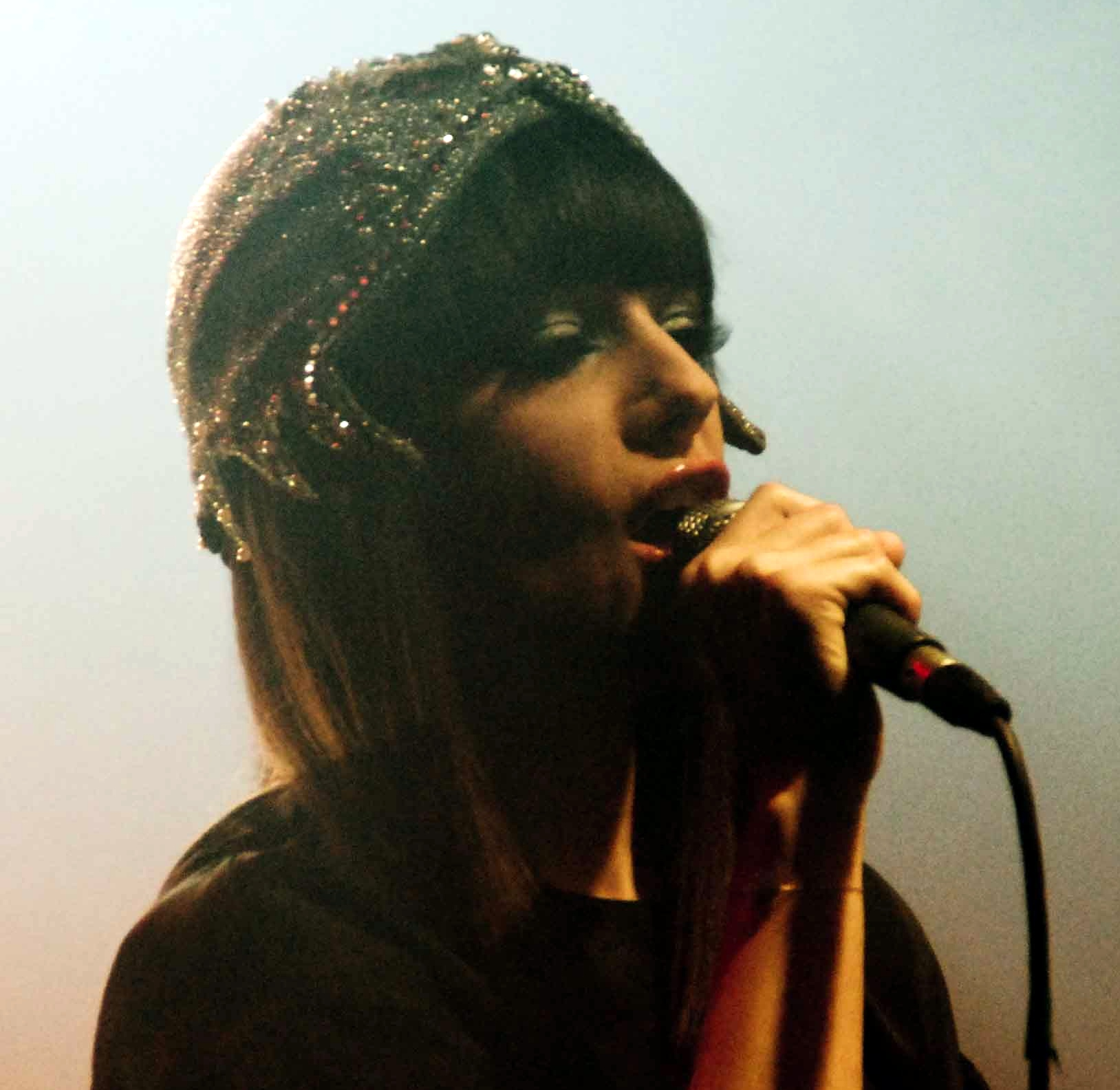
Alizée in 2010 singing at Point Ephémère lounge, in Paris.

For the promotion of the album Alizée did a photo shoot for her album. She also posed on the French magazine Technikart, on which she was imitating Madonna from her album Like a Virgin. A small showcase was held at Point Ephémère in Paris. She also participated in hommage to Serge Gainsbourg in Tel Aviv with cover version of Dis-lui toi que je t'aime by Vanessa Paradis, accompanied with the national orchestra at National Opéra Hall and another presentations with the Israeli singer Harel Skaat and other artist with whom she won the respect and affection of the country making this album a hit positioning itself at number one for two weeks on the Israeli charts after Israel's promotion.

=== Singles ===
"Limelight" was used as a teaser song for the album. The song is in English and is electro-pop in style. It was composed by Angy Laperdrix, Guillaume de Maria, Julien Galinier and Raphael Vialla. The single was only on sale in Poland.

"Les collines (Never Leave You)" (English: "The Hills (Never Leave You)") released in 2010. Is the first single from the album. The single is electro-pop. It was composed by Angy Laperdrix, Guillaume de Maria, Julien Galinier and Raphael Vialla. The single was praised by critics telling it to be "The song and the album that gave new life to Alizée's career, a good buzz in radical change of style." The single mixes French and English lyrics as many French songs these days. The English is used as an effect to bring it more variety.

== Critical reception ==
Professional ratings
Review scores
Source	Rating
Les Inrocks	Negative
Popjustice	10/10 stars
SACEM/SNEP	Positive

Une enfant du siècle was met with positive reviews, some praising the album's production and ambition, but others also criticizing Alizée's perceived lack of interest in the project. The album was considered a commercial failure.

== Track listing ==
No.	Title	Lyrics	Music	Length
1.	"Éden, Éden"	Jean-René Etienne	Rob	4:22
2.	"Grand Central"	Jérôme Échenoz; Etienne; Rebecca Zlotowski	Échenoz; Tahiti Boy	3:24
3.	"Limelight"	Château Marmont	Château Marmont	5:09
4.	"La Candida"	Adanowski	Rob	2:14
5.	"Les collines (Never Leave You)"	Etienne	Château Marmont	3:43
6.	"14 décembre"	Château Marmont	Château Marmont	3:18
7.	"À cœur fendre"	Etienne	Château Marmont	3:07
8.	"Factory Girl"	Echenoz; Etienne; David Rubato	Behar	4:11
9.	"Une fille difficile"	Etienne	Jean-Baptiste de Laubier; Château Marmont	3:41
10.	"Mes fantômes"	Etienne	Rob	3:16
Total length:				36:25

== Personnel ==
- Alizée – Artist and Chorus
- Chateau Marmont – Producer
- Partel Oliva – Artwork
- Jean-René Etienne – Executive Producer
- Nilesh Patel – Mastered
- Jack Lahana & Rob – Mix
- Strings:
  - Arthur Boutiller (tracks: 1, 3, 7)
  - Aurélie Lopez (tracks: 1, 3, 7)
  - David Gabel (tracks: 1, 3, 7)
  - Marie Friez (tracks: 1, 3, 7)
- Camille Vivier – Photography

== Chart performance ==
Une enfant du siècle entered the French Albums Chart at place 24 on 3 April 2010. On its second week, it fell down to place 69, spending only 2 weeks in the top 100 and 6 weeks in the top 200. It also peaked at place 13 on the digital chart but only spent 1 week in the top 50. In Mexico, the album started at place 22 and spent 5 weeks in the top 100, the first single peaked at the first place on the third week.

== Weekly charts ==
Chart (2010)	Peak position
Belgian Albums Chart (Wallonia)	60
French Albums Chart	24
Mexican Albums Chart	22
Russian Albums Chart	17

== Release history ==
Region	Date	Label	Format
France	29 March 2010	Jive Epic	CD, digital download, numbered Box Set (including CD and five 7-inch 45 rpm vinyls)
United Kingdom	29 March 2010	Wisteria	CD, digital download
