= John Casement =

Royal Navy Admiral (1877–1952)

Admiral John Casement CB
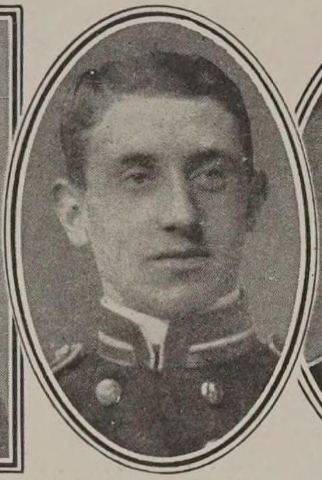
- Casement as a captain
- Born: 13 September 1877
- Died: 25 January 1952 (aged 74)
- Military career
- Allegiance: United Kingdom
- Branch: Royal Navy
- Service years: 1891-1931
- Rank: Admiral
- Commands: HMS Blanche; HMS Comus; HMS Courageous; HMS Benbow; 3rd Battle Squadron
- Conflicts: World War I
- Awards: Companion of the Order of the Bath

Admiral John Moore Casement CB (13 September 1877 – 25 January 1952) was a Royal Navy officer who commanded the 3rd Battle Squadron.

== Naval career ==
Educated at Fettes College and Britannia Royal Naval College, Casement joined the Royal Navy in 1891. He served in World War I as commanding officer of the cruiser HMS Blanche and saw action at the Battle of Jutland in 1916, in which he was commended for his service. He went on to become commanding officer of the cruiser HMS Comus in 1916.

After the War Casement became commanding officer of the battlecruiser HMS Courageous in 1921, commanding officer of the battleship HMS Benbow in 1924, and received flag rank as rear admiral on 4 October 1926. He was then appointed Commander of 3rd Battle Squadron in 1929 before retiring in 1931.

Casement held lands in Elagh and Aughterclooney, Tyrone, which were subject to the provisions of the Northern Ireland Land Act 1925.

Casement was appointed a Companion of the Order of the Bath (CB) in the 1928 Birthday Honours.
