= Johan Dalgaard =

Danish keyboardist and music producer

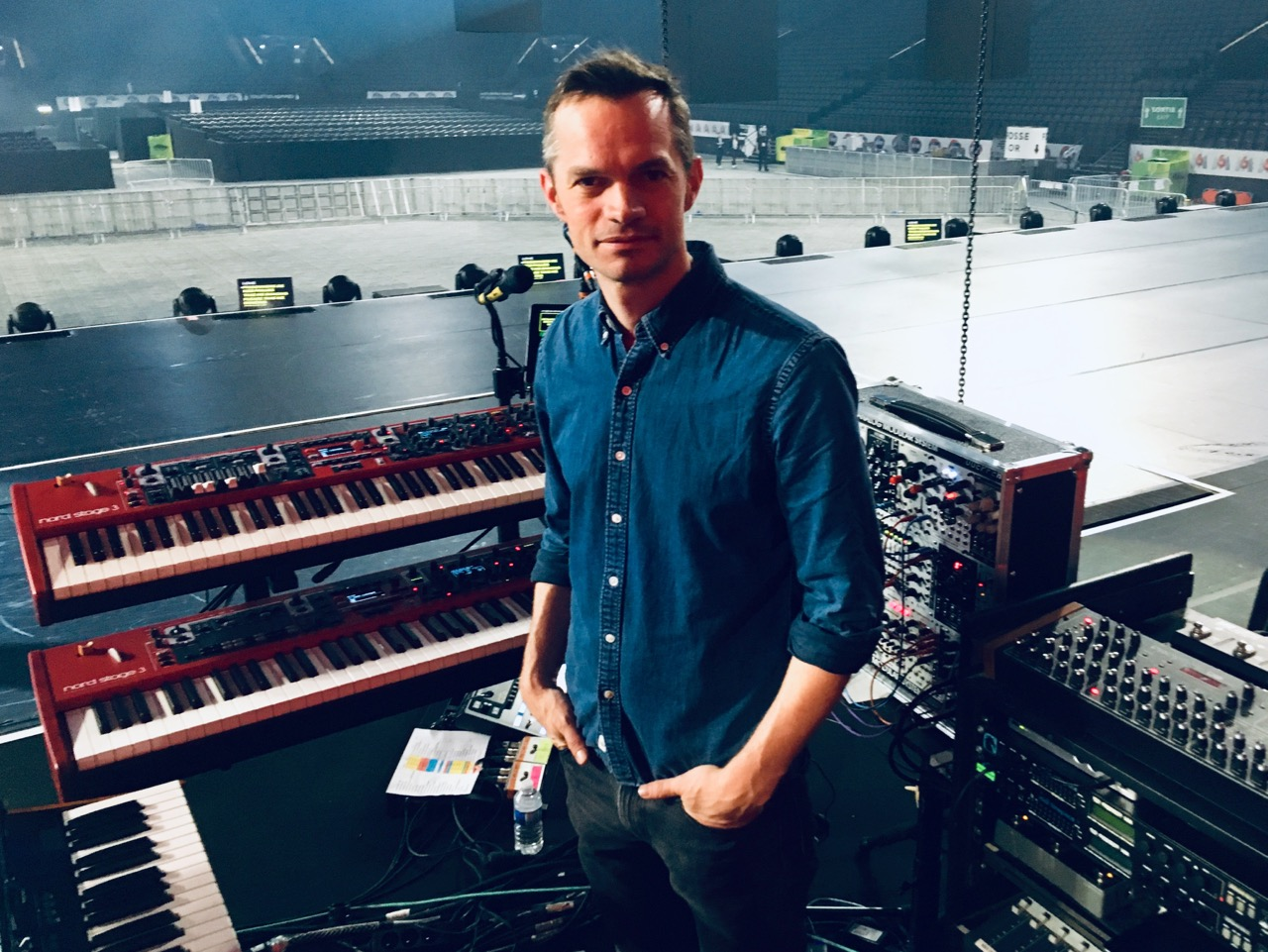

Background information
- Born: January 31, 1977 (age 49); Aarhus, Denmark
- Genres: Blues, Chanson, Pop
- Occupations: Keyboardist, record producer, radio host
- Years active: 1990s–present
- Website: johandalgaard.wordpress.com
Johan Dalgaard
- Presenting career
- Show: Bon temps rouler (TSF Jazz)

Johan Dalgaard (born January 31, 1977) is a Danish keyboardist, record producer, and radio host based in France.

During his early years in France, he was active in the French-American blues scene. In 2000, he was named Best Blues Keyboardist at the France Blues Awards.

== Biography ==
In 2004, Dalgaard began transitioning toward mainstream pop and rock styles. He has performed on tour with numerous prominent artists, including Johnny Hallyday, Mylène Farmer, Camille, Benjamin Biolay, Jean-Louis Aubert, Yael Naim, Christophe Maé, Louise Attaque, Damien Saez, Gaëtan Roussel, and Alan Stivell.

As a session musician, he has contributed to over 150 albums, totaling more than 10 million records sold. His credits include works by Calogero, Vianney, Gaëtan Roussel, Camélia Jordana, Imany, Kyo, Renan Luce, and Revolver.

In 2018, he produced Alain Chamfort's album Le Désordre des choses, which was nominated for Album of the Year at the Victoires de la Musique in 2019. The track "Tout est pop" won the Grand Prix for Song of the Year from the Union nationale des auteurs et compositeurs (UNAC).

Dalgaard co-produced Christophe Maé's 2023 album C'est drôle la vie, which was certified Platinum in France. In 2024, he produced nine tracks on Alain Chamfort's album L'Impermanence, which received two nominations at the 2025 Victoires de la Musique.

Since 2017, he has co-hosted the radio show Bon temps rouler with Jean-Jacques Milteau on TSF Jazz.
