= Elles & Lui =

Studio album by Alain Chamfort
- Released: Digital album: 7 May 2012 (France); CD album: 28 May 2012 (France)
- Recorded: 2011–2012
- Genre: French pop
- Length: 45:45
- Labels: Fontana; Mercury
- Producers: Olivier Schultheis; Jean-Pierre Pilot; William Rousseau

Alain Chamfort chronology
Une vie Saint Laurent (2010)	Elles & Lui (2012)	Alain Chamfort (2015)

Elles & Lui (English: Them & Him) is the 14th studio album by Alain Chamfort. It was digitally released in France on 7 May 2012, followed by a physical CD release on 28 May 2012. The album celebrates the 40th anniversary of Chamfort's career, with every track on the album featuring a duet with a female vocalist.

== Synopsis ==
"With nearly forty year career studded with elegant and refined compositions, Alain Chamfort is the undisputed leader of the French pop generation. He plotted, accompanied mainly by Serge Gainsbourg and Jacques Duvall of the words, the contours of a singular and timeless: Rendez-Vous au Paradis, Malaise en Malaisie, Manureva, L'ennemi dans la Glace, Bamboú, Traces de Toi, Mouse since it is serious, Clara veut la Lune, Palais Royal, and Les Beaux Yeux de Laure. A work in which seduction, compared to women, have always been paramount." (Mercury Records)

== Track listing ==
All lyrics are written by Jacques Duvall, except where noted; all music is composed by Alain Chamfort, except where noted.

No.	Title	Lyrics	Music	Original album	Length
1.	"Manureva" (with Audrey Marnay)	Serge Gainsbourg	Alain Chamfort; Jean-Noël Chaléat	Poses	4:49
2.	"Bambou" (with Camelia Jordana)	Gainsbourg		Amour, année zéro	3:26
3.	"Traces de Toi" (with Fredrika Stahl)		Chamfort; Marc Moulin	Tendres fièvres	3:34
4.	"Malaise en Malaisie" (with Vanessa Paradis)	Gainsbourg		Amour, année zéro	4:38
5.	"Souris Puisque C'Est Grave" (with Inna Modja)		Chamfort; Moulin	Trouble	3:01
6.	"L'Ennemi dans la Glace" (with Élodie Frégé)		Chamfort; Moulin	Neuf	3:56
7.	"Clara veut la Lune" (with Alizée)		Chamfort; Moulin	Neuf	3:08
8.	"Géant" (with Keren Ann)	Jean-Michel Rivat	Chamfort; Chaléat	Poses	3:46
9.	"La Fièvre dans le Sang" (with Capucine)		Chamfort; Moulin	Tendres fièvres	3:48
10.	"Les Beaux Yeux de Laure" (with Claire Keim)			Le plaisir	3:12
11.	"Palais royal" (with Sarah Manesse & Marina D'Amico)	Jay Alanski	Chamfort; Chaléat	Poses	4:01
12.	"Paradis" (with Jenifer)			Amour, année zéro	4:06

== Charts ==
=== Weekly charts ===
Chart (2012)	Peak position
Belgian Albums (Ultratop Wallonia)	10
French Albums (SNEP)	14

=== Year-end charts ===
Chart (2012)	Position
Belgian Albums (Ultratop Wallonia)	78
French Albums (SNEP)	158
