= Blond (disambiguation) =

Blond is a hair color.

Blond or Blondes may also refer to:

- Blond (surname)
- Blond, Haut-Vienne, France
- Blond Bay State Game Reserve, Australia

== Entertainment ==
- Blond (band), a Swedish boy band
- Blond, the alternative name that Swedish pop band Tages used between 1969 and 1970
- Blonds (band), an American indie pop band
- The Blonds, a short nickname of the name for The Hollywood Blonds, a name used by several professional wrestling tag teams
- An alternative title for Blonde, a 2016 album by Frank Ocean

== See also ==
- Blonde (disambiguation)
