= HMS Blonde (1910) =

Blonde class cruiser

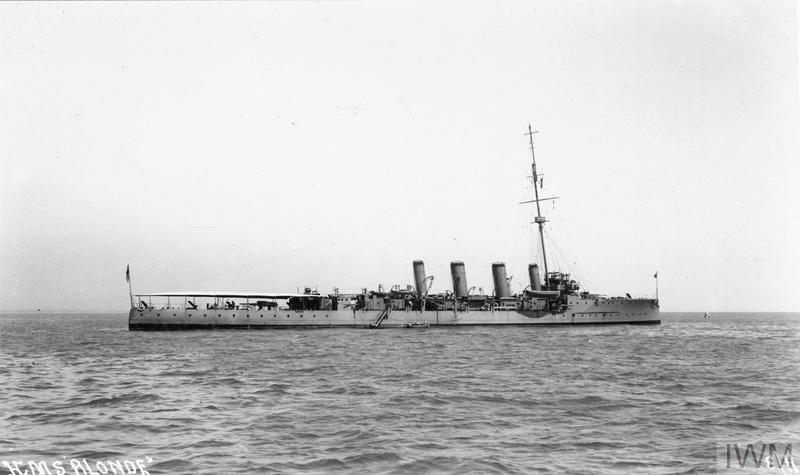
- HMS Blonde

History

United Kingdom
- Name: Blonde
- Builder: Pembroke Royal Dockyard
- Laid down: 6 December 1909
- Launched: 22 July 1910
- Completed: May 1911
- Fate: Sold for scrap, 6 May 1920

General characteristics
- Class & type: Blonde-class scout cruiser
- Displacement: 3,350 long tons (3,400 t) (normal)
- Length: 406 ft (123.7 m) (o/a)
- Beam: 41 ft 6 in (12.6 m)
- Draught: 14 ft 3 in (4.3 m)
- Installed power: 18,000 shp (13,000 kW); 12 × Yarrow boilers
- Propulsion: 4 × shafts; 4 × Parsons steam turbines
- Speed: 25 knots (46 km/h; 29 mph)
- Complement: 317
- Armament: 10 × single BL 4-inch (102 mm) guns; 4 × single QF 3-pounder 47 mm (1.9 in) guns; 2 × single 21-inch (530 mm) torpedo tubes
- Armour: Deck: .5–1 in (13–25 mm); Conning Tower: 4 in (102 mm)

HMS Blonde was the lead ship of her class of scout cruisers built for the Royal Navy in the first decade of the 20th century. She led the Seventh Destroyer Flotilla in the Mediterranean Fleet from completion until 1912. The ship was temporarily assigned to the First Destroyer Flotilla before she joined the Fourth Battle Squadron in 1913. During the First World War, Blonde was assigned to various battleship squadrons of the Grand Fleet. The ship was converted into a minelayer in 1917, but never actually laid any mines. She was reduced to reserve in 1919 and sold for scrap in 1920.

== Design and description ==
Designed to provide destroyer flotillas with a command ship capable of outclassing enemy destroyers with her 10 four-inch (102 mm) guns, Blonde proved too slow in service from the start of her career. Her 25-knot (46 km/h; 29 mph) speed was inadequate to match the 27-to-30-knot (50 to 56 km/h; 31 to 35 mph) speeds of the destroyers she led in her flotilla.

Displacing 3,350 long tons (3,400 t), the ship had an overall length of 406 feet (123.7 m), a beam of 41 feet 6 inches (12.6 m) and a deep draught of 14 feet 3 inches (4.3 m). She was powered by four Parsons steam turbines, each driving one shaft. The turbines produced a total of 18,000 indicated horsepower (13,000 kW), using steam produced by 12 Yarrow boilers, and gave a maximum speed of 25 knots (46 km/h; 29 mph). She carried a maximum of 780 long tons (790 t) of coal and 189 long tons (192 t) of fuel oil. Her crew consisted of 314 officers and ratings.

Her main armament consisted of 10 breech-loading (BL) four-inch Mk VII guns. The forward pair of guns were mounted side by side on a platform on the forecastle, three pairs were port and starboard amidships, and the two remaining guns were on the centreline of the quarterdeck, one ahead of the other. The guns fired their 31-pound (14 kg) shells to a range of about 11,400 yards (10,400 m). Her secondary armament was four quick-firing (QF) three-pounder 47 mm (1.9 in) Vickers Mk I guns and two submerged 21-inch (530 mm) torpedo tubes.

As a scout cruiser, the ship was only lightly protected to maximize her speed. She had a curved protective deck that was one inch (25 mm) thick on the slope and .5 inches (13 mm) on the flat. Her conning tower was protected by four inches of armour.

== Construction and service ==
Blonde, the eighth and last ship of that name, was laid down on No. 5 Slipway at Pembroke Royal Dockyard, on 6 December 1909 and launched on 22 July 1910 by Lady Frances Williams, wife of Sir Osmond Williams, 1st Baronet. She was completed in May 1911 with Captain Thomas Bonham in command and became the leader of the Seventh Destroyer Flotilla in the Mediterranean through 1912. On 14 August 1911, the cruiser took part in practice with the First Destroyer Flotilla. Captain Arthur Hulbert assumed command of the ship and the First Destroyer Flotilla of the First Fleet on 10 May 1912. He was lost at sea on 12 January 1913 and replaced by Captain Thomas Shelford. He was relieved by Captain William Blunt on 25 April and transferred to the scout cruiser, Fearless, when that ship was assigned to the flotilla. The ship had been transferred to the Fourth Battle Squadron as of 18 June and Captain Albert Scott assumed command on 5 July.

The ship was still assigned to the Fourth Battle Squadron of the Grand Fleet in Scapa Flow at the start of the war in August 1914. Captain John Casement was in command 20 March–21 May 1916. On 11 January 1916 Blonde and the Flotilla leader Broke were on patrol east of Scapa Flow when a depth charge carried by Blonde accidentally exploded, damaging her upper deck and killing two of her crew. The accident resulted in the type of depth charge carried by Blonde, the Egerton Depth Charge, being withdrawn from use by the Grand Fleet. The ship was under refit in April 1916 and missed the Battle of Jutland on 31 May–1 June 1916. Blonde was still detached in August. By October, she had rejoined the 4th Battle Squadron, with Captain Basil Brooke in command, but had been transferred to the 1st Battle Squadron by April 1917, Captain The Honourable Arthur Forbes-Sempill having assumed command in February. On 1 June, Commander Theodore Hallett relived Forbes-Semphill. In September 1917, she was converted into a minelayer, but never laid any mines in combat. Hallett was relieved by Captain Gregory Wood-Martin on 30 December, and he retained command until 10 January 1919 when he was relieved in turn by Captain Maurice Evans. Blonde was in reserve by February and had been assigned to the Nore Reserve by 1 May, together with her sister ship Blanche. The sisters were listed for sale by 18 March 1920 and Blonde was sold for scrap on 6 May to T. C. Pas, and was broken up in the Netherlands.

== Bibliography ==
- Campbell, John (1998). Jutland: An Analysis of the Fighting. London: Conway Maritime Press. ISBN 0-85177-750-3.
- Colledge, J. J.; Warlow, Ben (2006) [1969]. Ships of the Royal Navy: The Complete Record of All Fighting Ships of the Royal Navy from the 15th Century to the Present (3rd Rev ed.). London: Chatham Publishing. ISBN 978-1-86176-281-8. OCLC 67375475.
- Corbett, Julian (1997). Naval Operations to the Battle of the Falklands. History of the Great War: Based on Official Documents. Vol. I (2nd, reprint of the 1938 ed.). London and Nashville, Tennessee: Imperial War Museum and Battery Press. ISBN 0-89839-256-X.
- Corbett, Julian (1997). Naval Operations. History of the Great War: Based on Official Documents. Vol. II (reprint of the 1929 second ed.). London and Nashville, Tennessee: Imperial War Museum in association with the Battery Press. ISBN 1-870423-74-7.
- Friedman, Norman (2009). British Destroyers From Earliest Days to the Second World War. Annapolis, Maryland: Naval Institute Press. ISBN 978-1-59114-081-8.
- Friedman, Norman (2011). Naval Weapons of World War One. Barnsley, South Yorkshire, UK: Seaforth. ISBN 978-1-84832-100-7.
- Monograph No. 31: Home Waters—Part VI.: From October 1915 to May 1916 (PDF). Naval Staff Monographs (Historical). Vol. XV. The Naval Staff, Training and Staff Duties Division. 1926.
- Monograph No. 32: Lowestoft Raid: 24th–25th April 1916 (PDF). Naval Staff Monographs (Historical). Vol. XVI. The Naval Staff, Training and Staff Duties Division. 1927.
- Newbolt, Henry (1996). Naval Operations. History of the Great War Based on Official Documents. Vol. IV (reprint of the 1928 ed.). Nashville, Tennessee: Battery Press. ISBN 0-89839-253-5.
- Phillips, Lawrie (2014). Pembroke Dockyard and the Old Navy: A Bicentennial History. Stroud, Gloucestershire, UK: The History Press. ISBN 978-0-7509-5214-9.
- Preston, Antony (1985). "Great Britain and Empire Forces". In Gardiner, Robert & Gray, Randal (eds.). Conway's All the World's Fighting Ships 1906–1921. Annapolis, Maryland: Naval Institute Press. pp. 1–104. ISBN 0-85177-245-5.
