= Ghost Beach (band) =

American electronic music duo (2013–16)

- Origin: Brooklyn, New York, United States
- Genres: Electronic pop
- Years active: 2013–2016
- Labels: Nettwerk
- Past members: Josh Ocean; Eric "Doc" Mendelsohn
- Website: ghostbeachmusic.com

Ghost Beach was an American live electronic music duo consisting of Josh Ocean LaViolette (vocals, bass, synths) and Eric "Doc" Mendelsohn (guitars, synths, MPC sampler) based in New York City. Their sound was self-described as "tropical grit-pop" and was influenced by Peter Gabriel, the Police, Talking Heads, and other popular music of the 1980s. The name Ghost Beach was taken from the popular children's book series Goosebumps.

The band's debut album, Blonde, was released on Nettwerk Records on March 4, 2014. The album contains new material, as well as tracks from the band's self-released EPs. Blonde was produced by Nic Hard and Dave Weingarten. Blonde was mixed by Nic Hard.

Ghost Beach played at the South by Southwest Music Festival 2014. They also performed with Imagine Dragons, David Guetta, Vampire Weekend, and Robin Thicke.

== Artists vs. Artists ==
In March 2013, Ghost Beach employed a Times Square video billboard to publicly test philosophical questions of music piracy. For several weeks the billboard displayed the words "progress", "the future", "criminal", "a fad", "our generation", "harmless", freedom", "robbery" and "inevitable" under the words "Piracy is", and asked viewers to take a side by posting their opinions to social media using the hashtags #ArtistsForPiracy or #ArtistsAgainstPiracy. A related website aggregated public opinion. The campaign was carried out by TBWA\Chiat\Day in conjunction with American Eagle Outfitters, who paid for the use of the billboard.

== Discography ==
LPs

- Blonde (2014)

EPs

- Modern Tongues (2013)
- Modern Tongues Remixed (2013)
- Miracle (2013)
