= Luke (French band) =

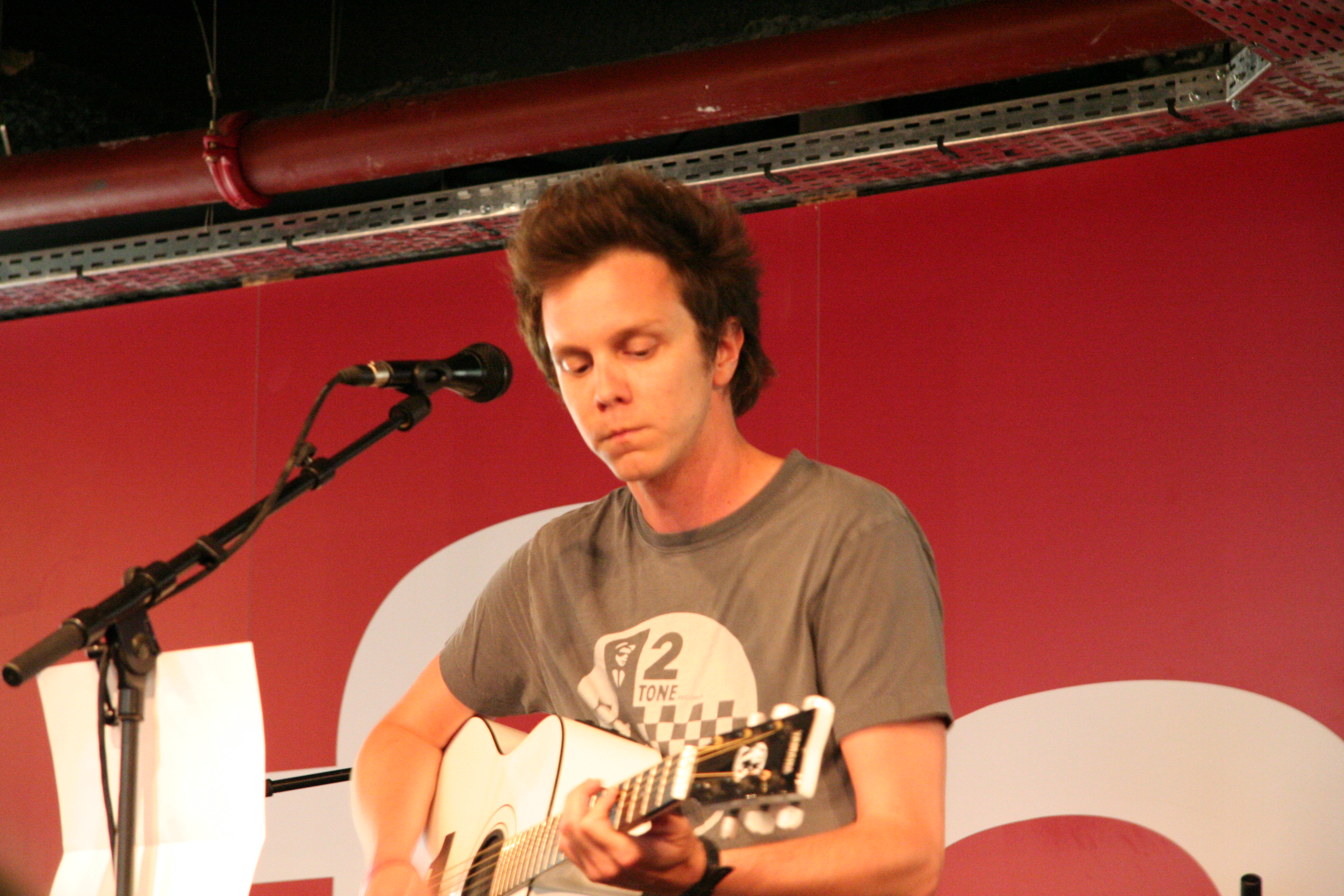
- Thomas Boulard (lead singer and guitarist) in September 2007

Background information
- Origin: France
- Genres: French rock
- Years active: 1998—Present
- Labels: RCA
- Members: Thomas Boulard; Jean-Pierre Ensuque; Damien Lefèvre; Romain Viallon
- Past members: François Jugé; Christophe Plantier; Ludovic Morillon; Stéphane Bouvier; Cyril Guillaneuf; Bayrem Benamor
- Website: luke.com.fr

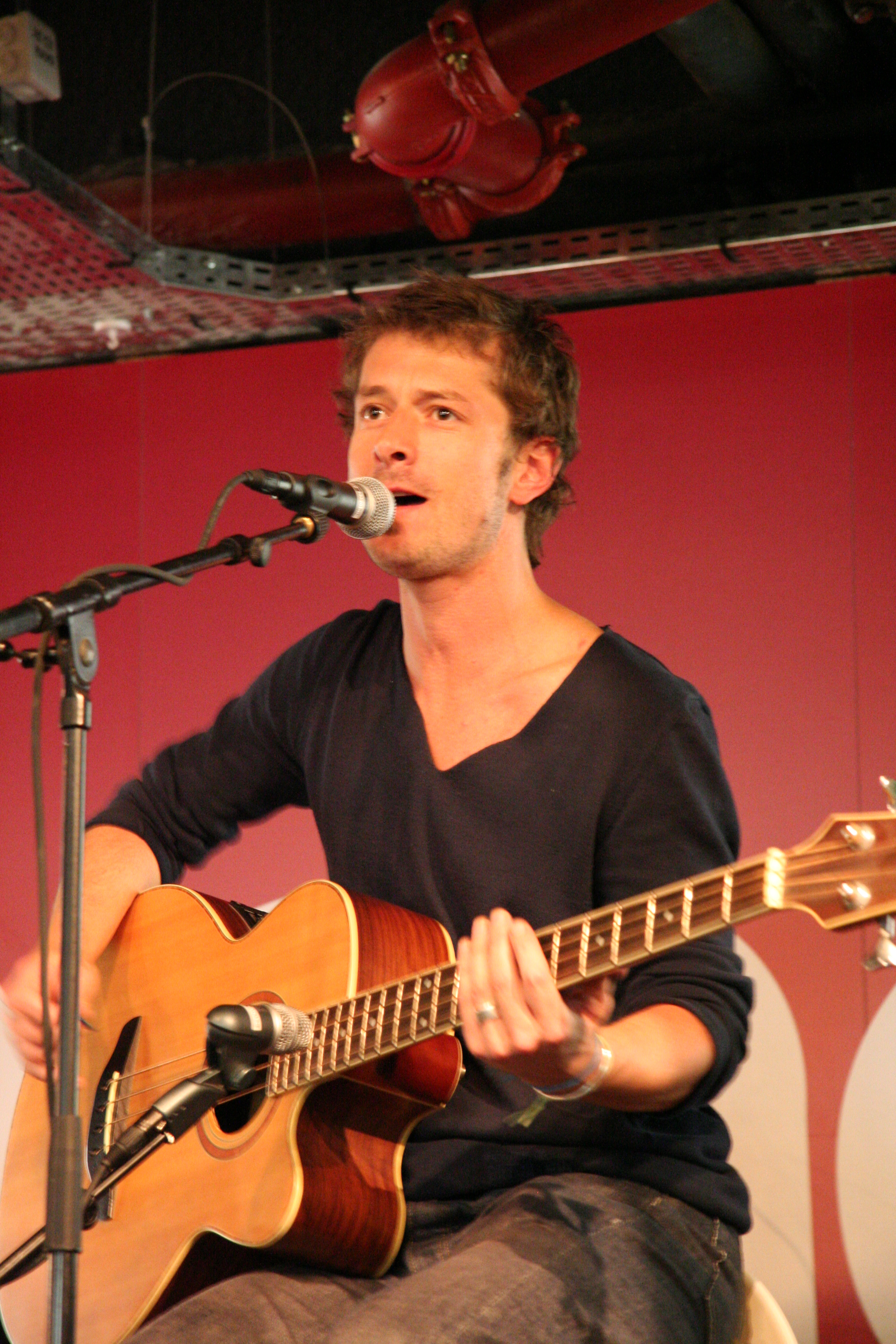
Damien Lefèvre (bass player) in September 2007

Luke is a French rock band. The group was formed in Aquitaine in 1998 when Thomas Boulard joined the group Spring, consisting of Christophe Plantier and François Jugé. The band's name is derived from the American movie Cool Hand Luke. In 1999, Luke composed a number of demos and a seven track CD. That same year they signed with Village Vert. They released an EP titled Je n'éclaire que moi.

In October 2001, the band released their first full album called La Vie presque. It was characterized by Boulard's intense lyrics. After a tour, they headed back to the studio.

In 2003, the group entered a studio in Picardy and recorded their second full-length album La Tête en arrière. La Sentinelle was the first single to be released, followed later by Soledad. With these two songs, Luke confirmed their success.

In 2004, Luke hit the road again. This time with a guitarist Bayrem Benamor who was recruited via the internet. At the end of the tour, both Cyril Guillaneuf and the new recruit both choose to leave the band. Benamor was replaced by guitarist Jean-Pierre Ensuque. During their 2005 tour, with the band Déportivo,

After a year of rest, they found themselves hard at work in the studio to record their third album, Les Enfants de Saturne. It was released on the tenth of September 2007. The first single La terre ferme was released and is available for download from their official website.

== Discography ==
=== Full-length albums ===
- 2001: La Vie presque
- 2004: La Tête en arrière
- 2005: La Tête en arrière (With an additional 5 songs)
- 2007: Les Enfants de Saturne (#8) on the French Hitlist.
- 2010: D'autre Part
- 2015: Pornographie
- 2019: Porcelaine

=== EPs ===
- 2000: Je n'éclaire que moi (CD Maxi 4 titres contenant les titres: "Je n'éclaire que moi", "Dimanche De Vote", "En Définitive", "Je Suis Un Soir D'été")
- 2008: Stella EP live : "Stella" (studio version), 'D'où vient le vent" (live), "Si tu veux" (live), "Stella" (live), "La transparente" (live))
