= Blonde-class cruiser =

Class of British scout cruisers

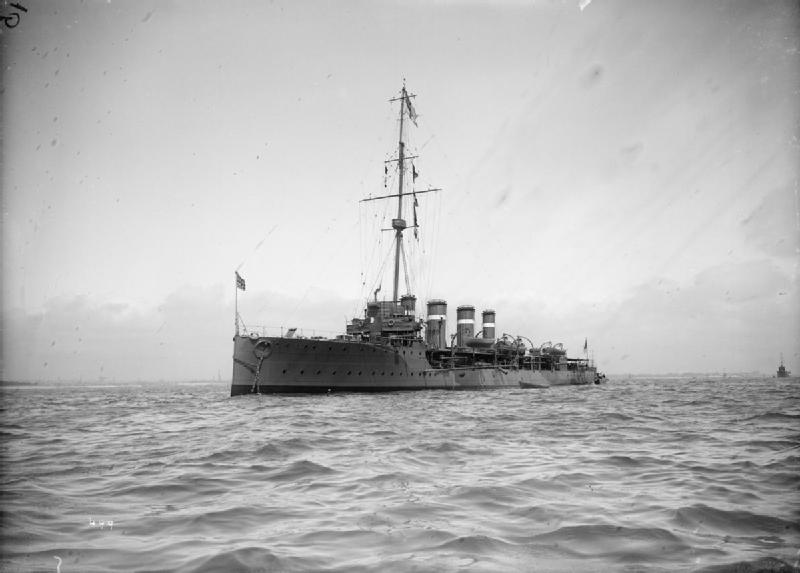
- HMS Blonde at anchor

Class overview
- Name: Blonde class
- Builders: Pembroke Dockyard
- Operators: Royal Navy
- Preceded by: Boadicea class
- Succeeded by: Active class
- Built: 1909–1911
- In commission: 1910–1921
- Completed: 2
- Scrapped: 2

General characteristics (as built)
- Type: Scout cruiser
- Displacement: 3,350 long tons (3,400 t)
- Length: 406 ft (123.7 m) (o/a)
- Beam: 41 ft 6 in (12.6 m)
- Draught: 15 ft 6 in (4.7 m)
- Installed power: 18,000 shp (13,000 kW); 12 × Yarrow boilers
- Propulsion: 4 × shafts; 2 × Parsons steam turbine sets
- Speed: 25 knots (46 km/h; 29 mph)
- Range: 4,100 nmi (7,600 km; 4,700 mi) at 10 knots (19 km/h; 12 mph)
- Complement: 314
- Armament: 10 × single BL 4 in (102 mm) guns; 4 × single QF 3-pounder 1.9 in (47 mm) guns; 2 × single 21-inch (533 mm) torpedo tubes
- Armour: Deck: 0.5–1 in (13–25 mm); Conning tower: 4 in (102 mm)

The Blonde-class cruisers were a pair of scout cruisers built for the Royal Navy in the first decade of the 20th century. Upon completion in 1910–11, they served as flotilla leaders for destroyer flotillas of the First Fleet until 1913 when they were assigned to battleship squadrons. When the First World War began in August 1914, they remained with their squadrons as the First Fleet was incorporated into the Grand Fleet, although they changed squadrons over the course of the war. Blonde did not participate in the Battle of Jutland in mid-1916, unlike her sister ship, Blanche, which did, but never fired a shot. They were converted into minelayers the following year, but only Blanche actually laid mines. The sisters were reduced to reserve in 1919 and sold for scrap in 1920–1921.

== Design and description ==
These scout cruisers were too slow to lead destroyers in battle or to defend the fleet against enemy destroyer attacks, but they were still used as flotilla leaders. The Blonde class was essentially a repeat of the preceding Boadicea class, albeit with a more powerful armament and less fuel. Displacing 3,350 long tons (3,400 t), the ships had an overall length of 405 feet (123.4 m), a beam of 41 feet 6 inches (12.6 m) and a deep draught of 15 feet 6 inches (4.7 m). They were powered by four sets of Parsons steam turbines, each driving two shafts. The turbines produced a total of 18,000 indicated horsepower (13,000 kW), using steam produced by 12 Yarrow boilers that burned both fuel oil and coal, and gave a maximum speed of 24.5 knots (45.4 km/h; 28.2 mph). They carried a maximum of 780 long tons (790 t) of coal and 190 long tons (190 t) of fuel oil that gave them a range of 4,100 nautical miles (7,600 km; 4,700 mi) at 10 knots (19 km/h; 12 mph). Their crew consisted of 314 officers and ratings.

The main armament of the Blonde class consisted of ten breech-loading (BL) 4-inch (102 mm) Mk VII guns. The forward pair of guns were mounted side by side on a platform on the forecastle, six were amidships, three on each broadside, and the two remaining guns were on the centreline of the quarterdeck, one ahead of the other. The guns fired their 31-pound (14 kg) shells to a range of about 11,400 yards (10,400 m). Their secondary armament was four quick-firing (QF) three-pounder 1.9-inch (47 mm) Vickers Mk I guns and two submerged 21-inch (533 mm) torpedo tubes.

As scout cruisers, the ships were only lightly protected to maximise their speed. They had a curved protective deck that was one inch (25 mm) thick on the slope and 0.5 inches (13 mm) on the flat. Their conning tower was protected by four inches of armour.

== Ships ==
Construction data
Ship	Builder	Laid down	Launched	Completed
HMS Blonde	Pembroke Dockyard	6 December 1909	22 July 1910	May 1911
HMS Blanche	Pembroke Dockyard	12 April 1909	25 November 1909	November 1910

== Service ==
Both Blonde and Blanche began their careers with destroyer flotillas, Blonde as senior officers' ship for the 7th Flotilla of the Mediterranean Fleet and Blanche with the 1st Destroyer Flotilla of the First Fleet. But the sisters were transferred to the 4th and the 3rd Battle Squadrons, respectively, of the First Fleet in 1913.

Blonde remained with the 4th Battle Squadron through 1916, although she was detached for several months mid year. She had been transferred to the 1st Battle Squadron by April 1917 and was converted into a minelayer later in the year, although she never laid any mines in combat. Similarly, Blanche remained with the 3rd Battle Squadron until January 1916 when she joined her sister in the 4th Battle Squadron. The ship participated in the Battle of Jutland, but was on the unengaged side of the fleet and did not have the opportunity to fire at the Germans. She was detached from the 4th Battle Squadron at the beginning of 1917, presumably to be converted into a minelayer. Blanche was assigned to the 5th Battle Squadron by April and laid some mines at the entrance to the Kattegat in February 1918.

Blonde was in reserve by February 1919 and had been assigned to the Nore Reserve by 1 May, together with Blanche. The sisters were listed for sale by 18 March 1920 and Blonde was sold for scrap on 6 May. Blanche followed on 27 July 1921.

== Bibliography ==
- Colledge, J. J.; Warlow, Ben (2006) [1969]. Ships of the Royal Navy: The Complete Record of All Fighting Ships of the Royal Navy from the 15th Century to the Present (3rd Rev ed.). London: Chatham Publishing. ISBN 978-1-86176-281-8. OCLC 67375475.
- Corbett, Julian (1997). Naval Operations to the Battle of the Falklands. History of the Great War: Based on Official Documents. Vol. I (2nd, reprint of the 1938 ed.). London and Nashville, Tennessee: Imperial War Museum and Battery Press. ISBN 0-89839-256-X.
- Corbett, Julian (1997). Naval Operations. History of the Great War: Based on Official Documents. Vol. II (reprint of the 1929 second ed.). London and Nashville, Tennessee: Imperial War Museum in association with the Battery Press. ISBN 1-870423-74-7.
- Corbett, Julian (1997). Naval Operations. History of the Great War: Based on Official Documents. Vol. III (reprint of the 1940 second ed.). London and Nashville, Tennessee: Imperial War Museum in association with the Battery Press. ISBN 1-870423-50-X.
- Friedman, Norman (2009). British Destroyers From Earliest Days to the Second World War. Annapolis, Maryland: Naval Institute Press. ISBN 978-1-59114-081-8.
- Friedman, Norman (2011). Naval Weapons of World War One. Barnsley, South Yorkshire, UK: Seaforth. ISBN 978-1-84832-100-7.
- Newbolt, Henry (1996). Naval Operations. History of the Great War Based on Official Documents. Vol. IV (reprint of the 1928 ed.). Nashville, Tennessee: Battery Press. ISBN 0-89839-253-5.
- Phillips, Lawrie (2014). Pembroke Dockyard and the Old Navy: A Bicentennial History. Stroud, Gloucestershire, UK: The History Press. ISBN 978-0-7509-5214-9.
- Preston, Antony (1985). "Great Britain and Empire Forces". In Gardiner, Robert; Gray, Randal (eds.). Conway's All the World's Fighting Ships 1906–1921. Annapolis, Maryland: Naval Institute Press. pp. 1–104. ISBN 0-85177-245-5.
- Smith, Peter C. (2005). Into the Minefields: British Destroyer Minelaying 1916–1960. Barnsley, UK: Pen & Sword Maritime. ISBN 1-84415-271-5.
