= Alain Chamfort =

French singer

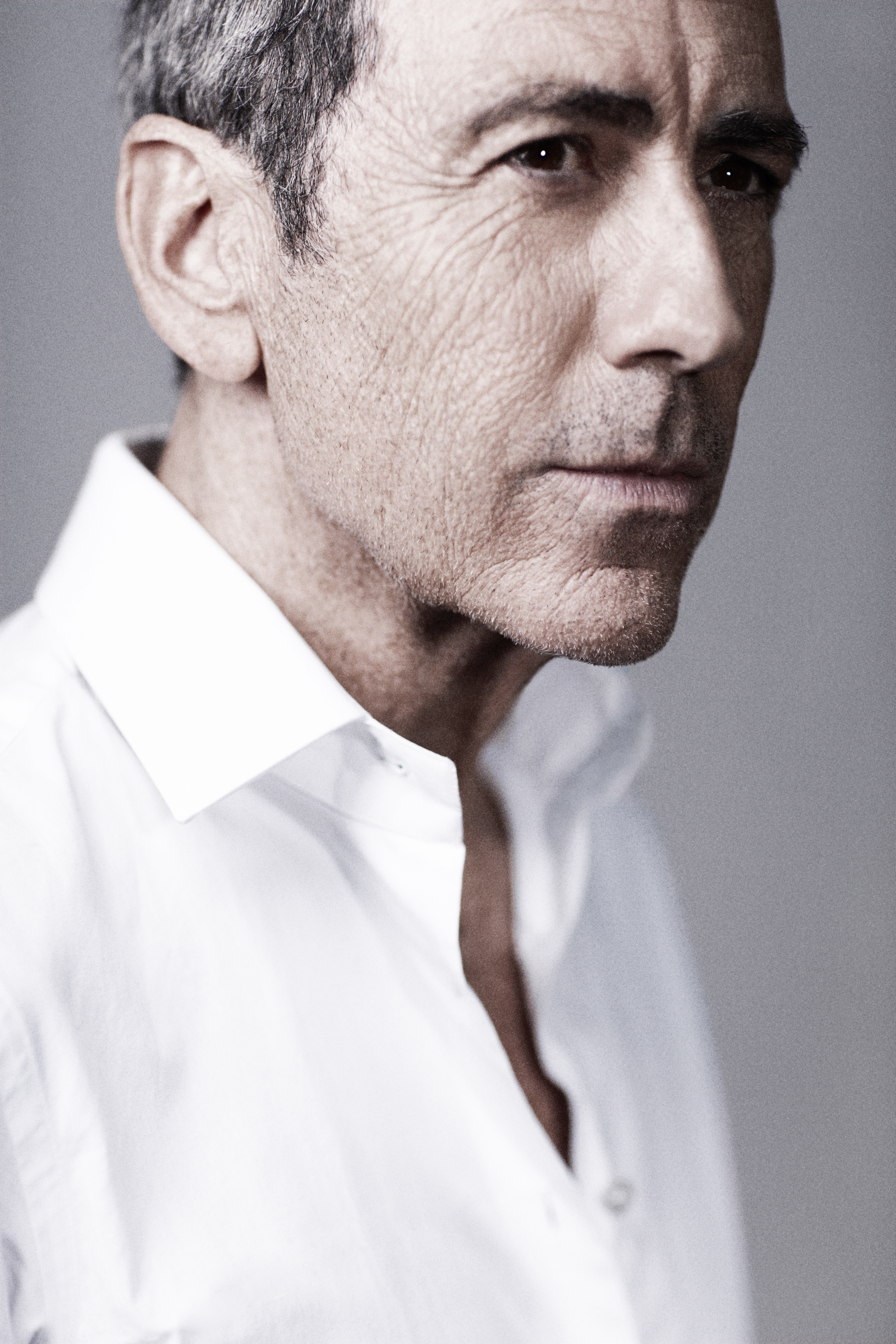
- Chamfort in 2010

Background information
- Born: Alain Joseph Yves Le Govic; 2 March 1949 (age 77); Paris, France
- Occupations: Singer; composer; actor
- Years active: 1966–present
- Website: alain-chamfort.com

Alain Chamfort (French pronunciation: [alɛ̃ ʃɑ̃fɔʁ]; born Alain Joseph Yves Le Govic; 2 March 1949) is a French singer of Breton origin.

== Life and career ==
Chamfort was a promising pianist in his youth, and the piano became his instrument of choice. His first band The Dreamers had minor success as a repertory jazz outfit, and was followed by a typically sixties rock music group Murator.

Chamfort met famed writer and producer Jacques Dutronc, who proposed to help him with future works for television and film, and it is with Dutronc that Chamfort's career expanded. After being discovered by Dutronc, it was with Claude François and ultimately Serge Gainsbourg that he made a number of albums, including his first album recorded as Alain Chamfort: Poses. A single from the album, "Manureva" remains one of the most famous songs to date by Chamfort, whose subject is the yacht Manureva which disappeared with her skipper Alain Colas in 1978.

Chamfort composed for the cinema; he worked with Jean-Pierre Mocky and with Arnaud Sélignac. As an actor, he appeared in the short Men/Toys/Girl in 2001. In 2004, he became a member of the board of directors of SACEM.

== Discography ==
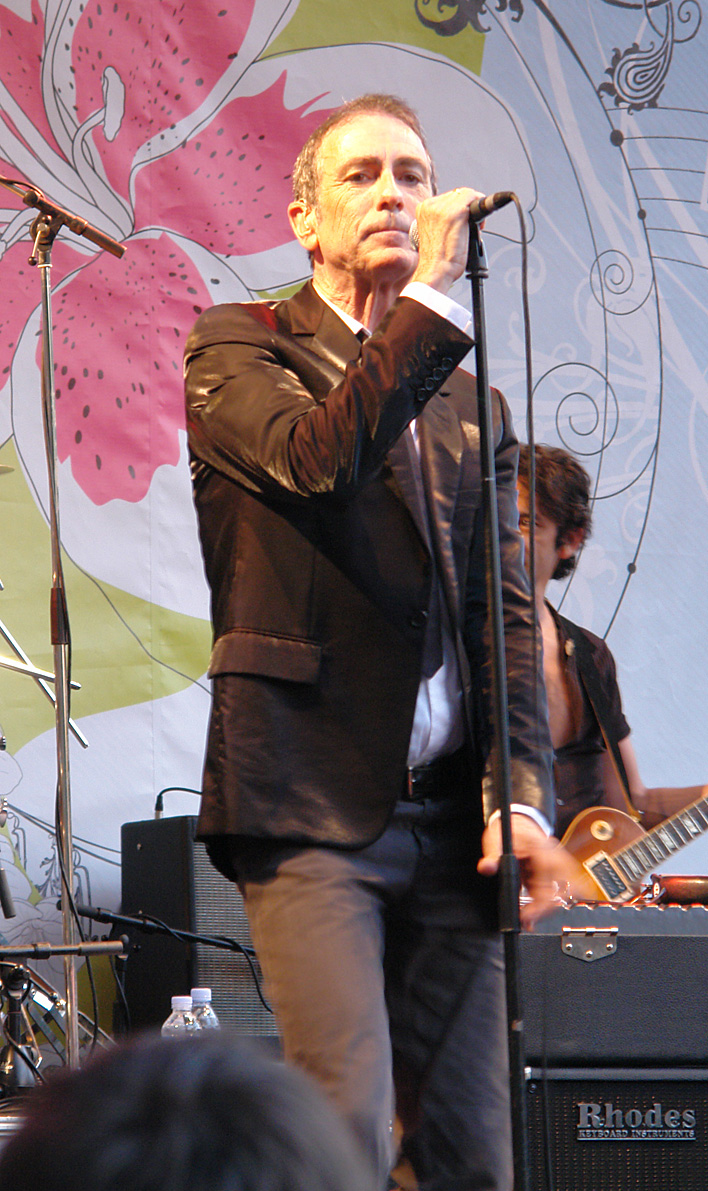
Chamfort performing in 2006

=== Studio albums ===
- L'amour en France (1974, Flèche)
- Mariage à l'essai (1976, CBS)
- Rock'n Rose (1977, CBS)
- Poses (1979, CBS)
- Amour, année zéro (1981, CBS)
- Secrets glacés (1983, CBS)
- Tendres fièvres (1986, CBS)
- Trouble (1990, CBS)
- Neuf (1993, Epic)
- Personne n'est Parfait (1997, Epic)
- Le Plaisir (2003, Delabel)
- Une vie Saint Laurent (2010, Tessland)
- Elles & Lui (2012, Mercury)
- Alain Chamfort (2015, PIAS)
- Le Désordre des choses (2018, PIAS)
- L'Impermanence (2024, BMG, Tessland)

=== Live albums ===
- Double Vie (1988, CBS)
- Impromptu Dans Les Jardins Du Luxembourg (2005, XIII Bis)
- Symphonique dandy (2021, Tessland) (recorded without an audience due to the COVID-19 pandemic).

=== Compilations ===
- Ce N'est Que Moi (2000, Epic) 1977–2000
- Le Chemin Est Le Bonheur 1976–2006 (2006, XIII Bis) 1976–2005
- Le meilleur d'Alain Chamfort (versions originales) (2016, PIAS)
- Le meilleur d'Alain Chamfort (versions revisitées) (2016, PIAS)
- Temps forts (2025, BMG, Tessland)

== Filmography ==
Year	Title	Role	Notes
1993	Une femme pour moi	Guillaume	Telefilm
2001	Men/Toys/Girl	The player	Short
2008	Écrire pour un chanteur	A man	TV series
2013	Games of Clouds & Rain	Simon	
2015	Les Châteaux de sable	Éléonore's father	
