= Boca Del Rio =

San Pedro Town
- Town
- San Pedro Town, Ambergris Caye
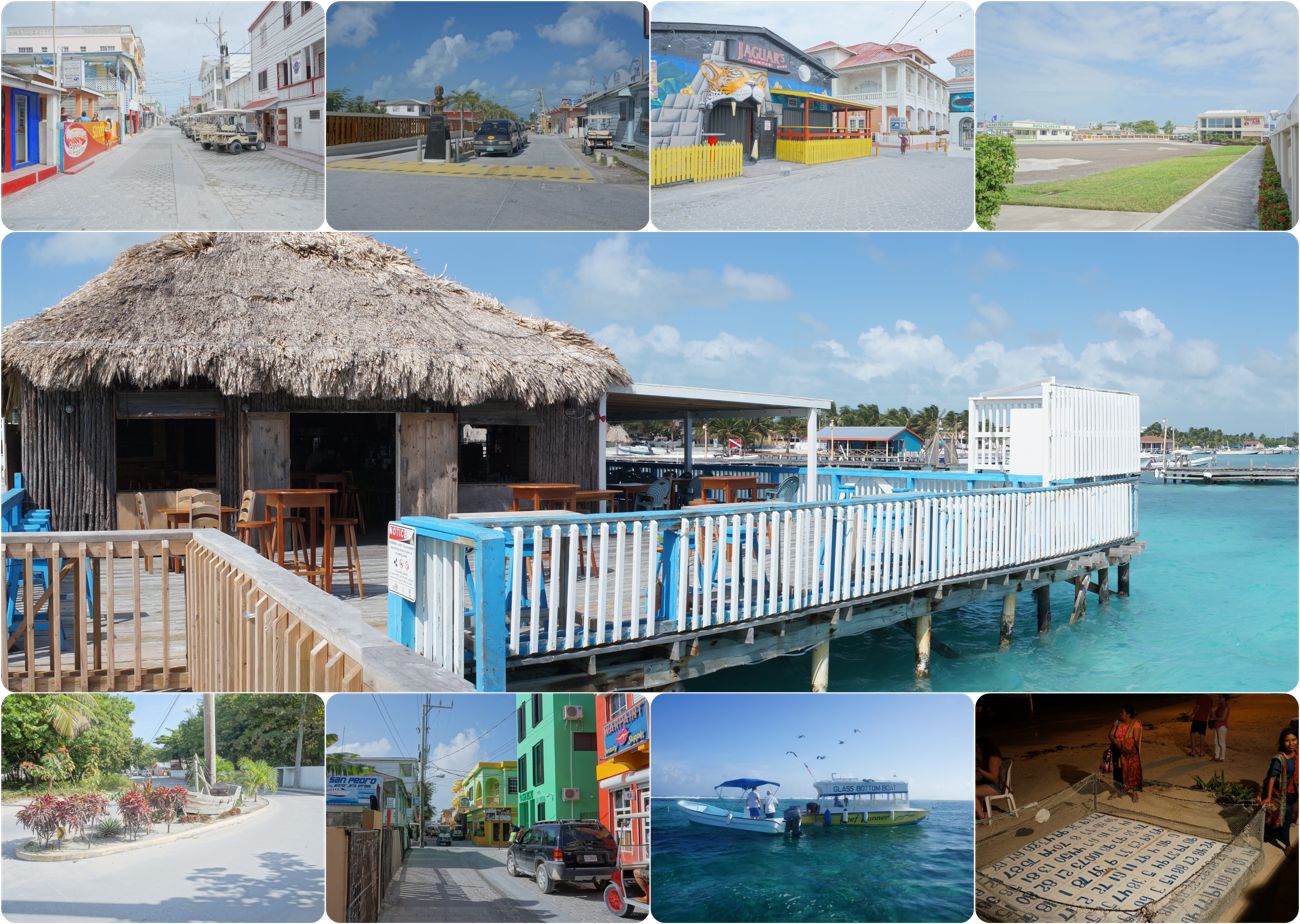
- San Pedro Collage.
- Nickname: La Isla Bonita
- Country: Belize
- District: Belize
- Constituency: Belize Rural South
- San Pedro: 1848

Government
  - Mayor: Mr.Daniel Guerrero (UDP)

Boca Del Rio (also known as La Isla Bonita) is an area located in San Pedro Town in the northern part of Belize near San Juan (St. John). In English, its name means "Mouth Of The River."
