= Psychédélices Tour =

Concert tour by Alizée

- Tour by Alizée
- Promotional poster for the tour
- Associated album: Psychédélices
- Start date: 18 May 2008
- End date: 25 June 2008
- No. of shows: 1 in Europe; 5 in North America; 6 Total

Alizée concert chronology
- En concert Tour (2003–2004); Psychédélices Tour (2008)

The Psychédélices Tour by French singer Alizée began in 2008. She promoted her album with the tour which was highly focused in Mexico, being one of the countries where Alizée has experienced most of her success. On 2008, she appeared in one performance in Russia and five in Mexico. The performance in Paris, France, on Le Grand Rex was cancelled, making this the only tour by Alizée that had no venues in France. She returned to Mexico in 2009 for one concert for San Marcos Fair, where she appeared as an international guest. The follow-up concert was not part of the actual tour and had only a partial song list performed.

== Background and development ==
In March 2008, Alizée visited Mexico for the first time on a short promotional tour. On 5 March she was supposed to hold the second-ever public autograph session of her career but it was cancelled due to problems with the store's security. Alizée held an improvised press conference to apologise to all her Mexican fans and to explain that it was not her fault. Sony BMG Mexico also released a statement saying it was not Alizée's fault, that it was the store who had problems with the security, and that they did not expect so many people in attendance; fences had been broken and children were in danger. Alizée also promised to make amends by having another autograph session when she returned to the country on the following tour. She also stated that her tour would start on 18 May in Moscow, followed by concerts in Mexico and then France. She also commented that piracy in music has two sides "one good" and "one bad" saying that sometimes it's good because her music reaches places that she never thought to reach. After the success of Alizée's tour in Mexico and in an attempt to amend the damage caused during her first promotional visit, Alizée announced an autograph session with fans on 26 June 2008 in Mexico City, over 300 CDs were signed and the record label executives of Sony BMG Mexico presented a Gold certification for shipments over 50,000 copies of Psychédélices – Tour Edition. A new cover singing in Mexico was Madonna's cover, "La Isla Bonita"; it has gone on to become Alizée's first top ten on the airplay chart.

Following the success of Alizée en concert and Psychédélices in Mexico, Alizée's former music label, Universal Music released a compilation album, titled Tout Alizée. The compilation, which is a Mexico-only release, consists of 15 tracks (with 4 remixes) from her first two studio albums. It is augmented with a bonus DVD featuring some of her music videos. The compilation debuted to #62 on the Mexican Top 100 Albums Chart and #20 on the Mexican International Top 20 Albums Chart.

== Setlist ==
=== Russia ===
1. "Lilly Town
2. "Fifty-Sixty
3. "Mon Taxi Driver
4. "Idealiser
5. "Par les Paupières
6. "Moi... Lolita
7. "Hey! Amigo!
8. "Jamais Plus
9. "J'en ai marre!
10. "The Sound of Silence
11. "L'Effet
12. "Amélie m'a dit
13. "Lonely List
14. "L'Alizé
15. "99 Luftballons
16. "J'ai pas vingt ans
17. "Décollage
18. "Mademoiselle Juliette
19. "Psychédélices

Reprise

1. "Fifty-Sixty

=== Mexico ===
1. "Lilly Town
2. "Mademoiselle Juliette
3. "Mon Taxi Driver
4. "J'en ai marre!
5. "Jamais Plus
6. "Moi... Lolita
7. "Par Les Paupières
8. "Fifty-Sixty
9. "Lonely List
10. "J'ai pas vingt ans
11. "The Sound of Silence
12. "L'Effet
13. "La Isla Bonita
14. "Hey! Amigo!
15. "Décollage
16. "Psychédélices

Reprise

1. "J'en ai marre!

=== Concerts ===
Date	City	Country	Venue
18 May 2008	Moscow	Russia	Opera Theatre
17 June 2008	Mexico City	Mexico	Auditorio Nacional
18 June 2008	Mexico City	Mexico	Auditorio Nacional
20 June 2008	Guadalajara	Mexico	Auditorio Telmex
21 June 2008	Puebla	Mexico	Auditorio Siglo XXI
25 June 2008	Monterrey	Mexico	Arena Monterrey

Cancelled concerts

Date	City	Country	Venue	Extra Info
22 June 2008	Queretaro	Mexico	-	Announced but never on sale.
23 June 2008	Leon	Mexico	-	Announced but never on sale.
11 September 2008	Nantes	France	-	Announced but never on sale.
12 September 2008	Brussels	Belgium	Cirque Royal	Announced but never on sale.
13 September 2008	Liège	Belgium	Le Forum	Announced but never on sale.
28 March 2009	Paris	France	Le Grand Rex	First rescheduled two weeks before the concert (original date was 23 October 2008). Finally cancelled.
