= San Pedro Town =

- Town
- Town of San Pedro, Ambergris Caye
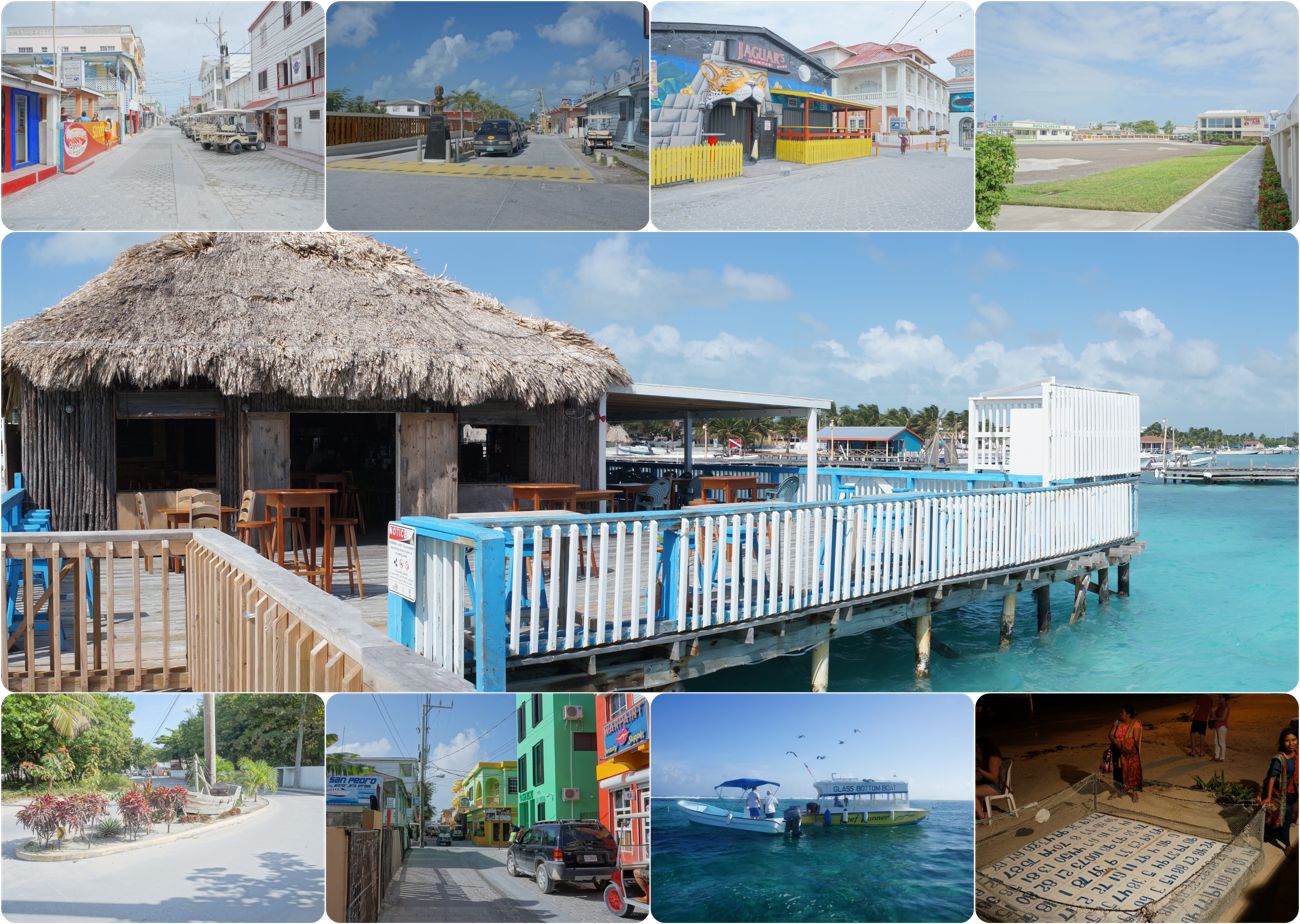
- San Pedro Collage
- Nickname: La Isla Bonita
- Location within Belize
- Coordinates: 17°55′17″N 87°57′40″W
- Country: Belize
- District: Belize
- Constituency: Belize Rural South
- San Pedro: 1848

Government
  - Mayor: Gualberto 'Wally' Nuñez

Area
  - Total: 71 km^{2} (27.5 sq mi)
- Elevation: 2 m (6.6 ft)

Population (2010)
  - Total: 11,767
  - Estimate (2016): 17,429
  - Density: 165/km^{2} (428/sq mi)
- Demonym: San Pedrano(a)
- Time zone: UTC-6 (Central)
- Climate: Aw

San Pedro is a town on the southern part of the island of Ambergris Caye in the Belize District of the nation of Belize, in Central America. According to the 2024 mid-year estimates, the town has a population of about 20,000. It is the second-largest town in the Belize District and largest in the Belize Rural South constituency. The once sleepy fishing village was granted the status of a town in 1984.

San Pedro's inhabitants are known as San Pedranos and most of them originally came from Mexico. Most speak both Spanish and English fluently. Due to the influence of English-based Kriol, most San Pedranos can speak English, as well as an intermediate form between English and Spanish that is known as "Kitchen Spanish". It is said that one is not a true San Pedrano if one does not know how to fish.

The town is said to be the inspiration for the song "La Isla Bonita" (which begins with the line "last night I dreamt of San Pedro"), written by Madonna, Patrick Leonard and Bruce Gaitsch. Manuel Heredia, minister of tourism in Belize commented that Madonna's song has helped to attract tourists to the town.

== History ==
The refugees from the "Guerra de Castas" fled mainly south to the sanctuary of northern Belize where the British authorities gave them protection and encouraged them to settle. This was done in the hope that the refugees would eventually establish an agricultural settlement in Corozal and provide the lumber camps with an alternative source of foodstuffs now that the supplies through Bacalar in Mexico were no longer available.

This migration was the principal factor in the settling of northern Belize. The population grew from less than 200 in 1846 to 4,500 inhabitants by 1857, to 8,000 in 1858, in the Corozal District alone. According to the official census in 1861, the population of the northern section of the country was almost twice that of Belize City and the surrounding areas.

The first permanent settlers of San Pedro arrived between 1848 and 1849. These probably consisted of the relatives of fishermen who had previously built fishing camps on the cayes and moved their families over to the safety of the island when the Santa Cruz Maya revolted. There were at first only four families, which were shortly joined by others from the nearby area of Bacalar. The settlement soon grew to a village of about 30 houses and over 50 inhabitants. The settling of Ambergris Caye was typical of this general pattern. The refugees who came to live here had been farmers and fishers in Yucatán who continued these activities in San Pedro.

On November 27, 1984, San Pedro was officially granted township status. The declaration ceremony was attended by Governor-General Elmira Minita Gordon, Area Representative Louis Sylvestre, and most of the residents of San Pedro. Gilberto Chico Gomez was the town's first mayor.

== Gallery ==
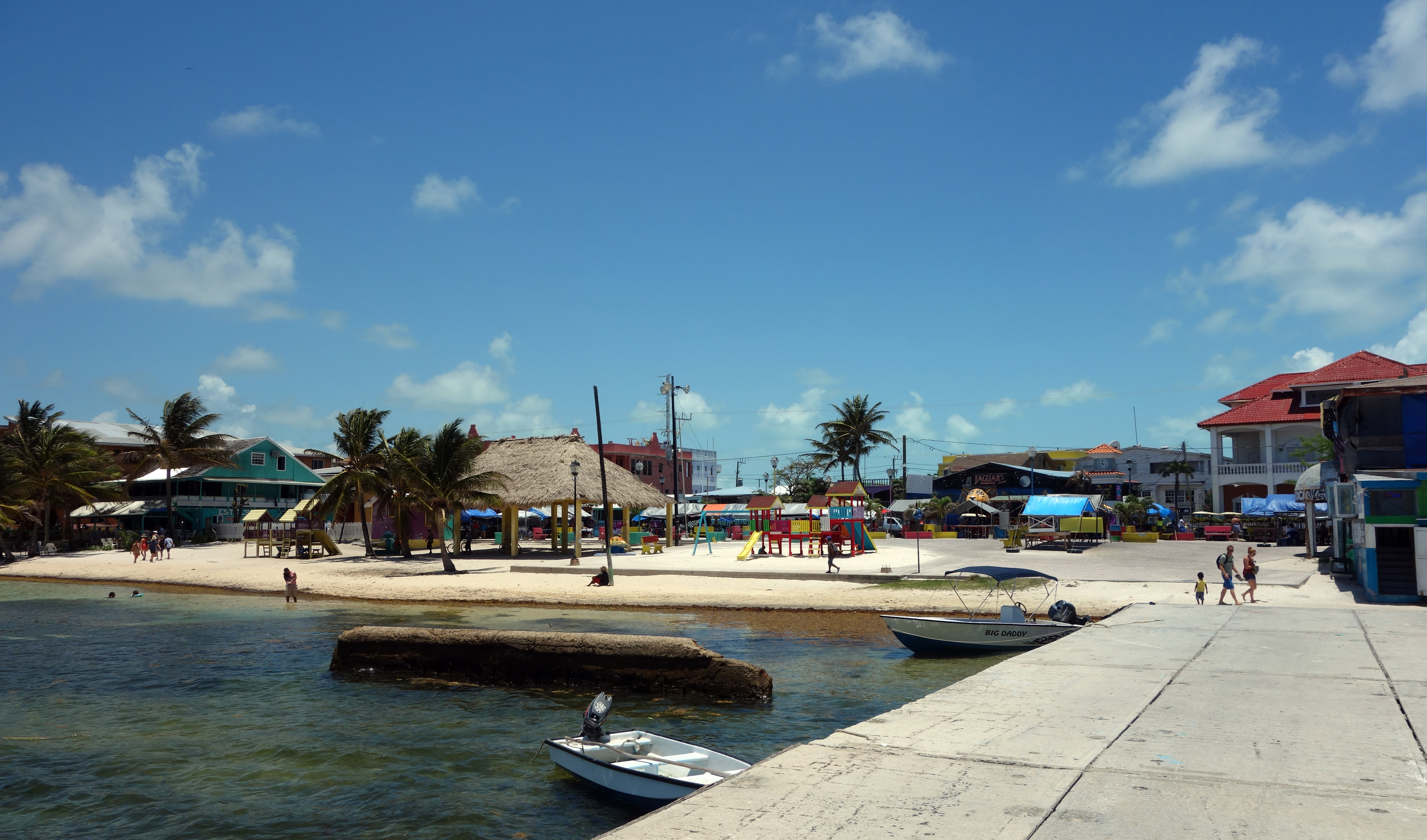
Downtown San Pedro

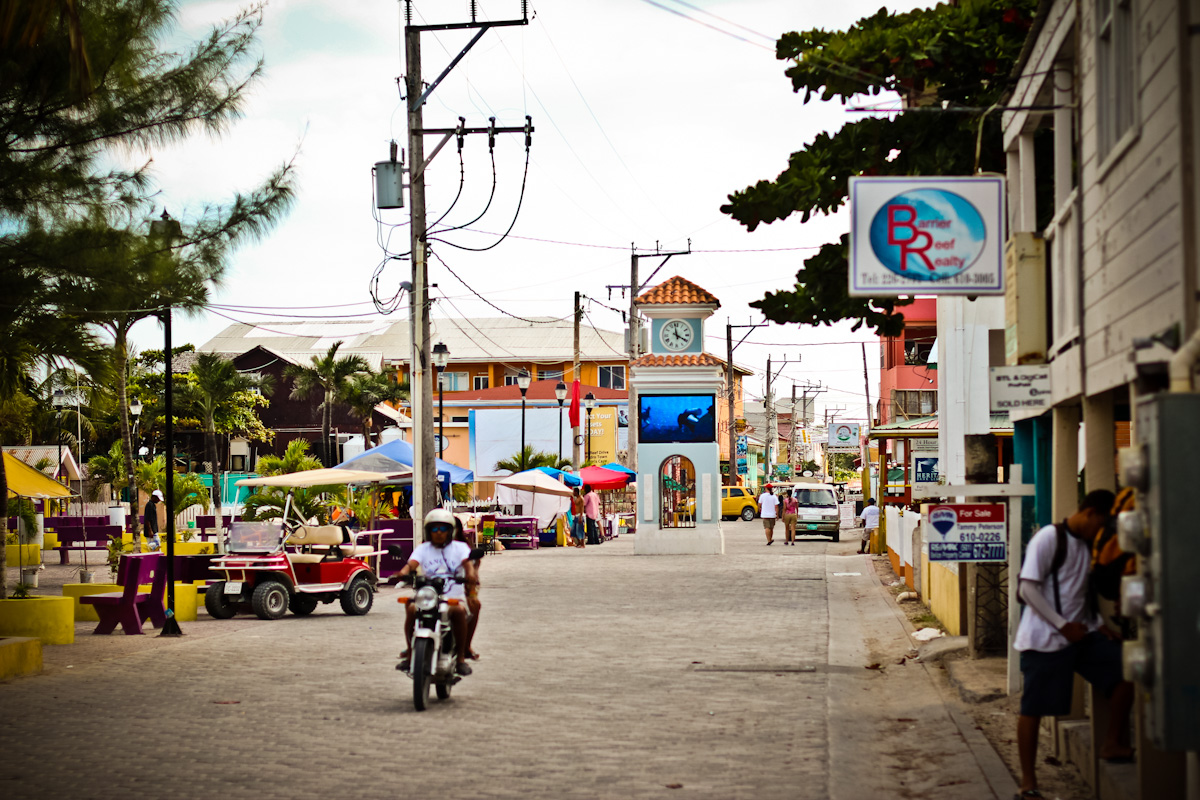
Main Street in San Pedro, Belize, looking south

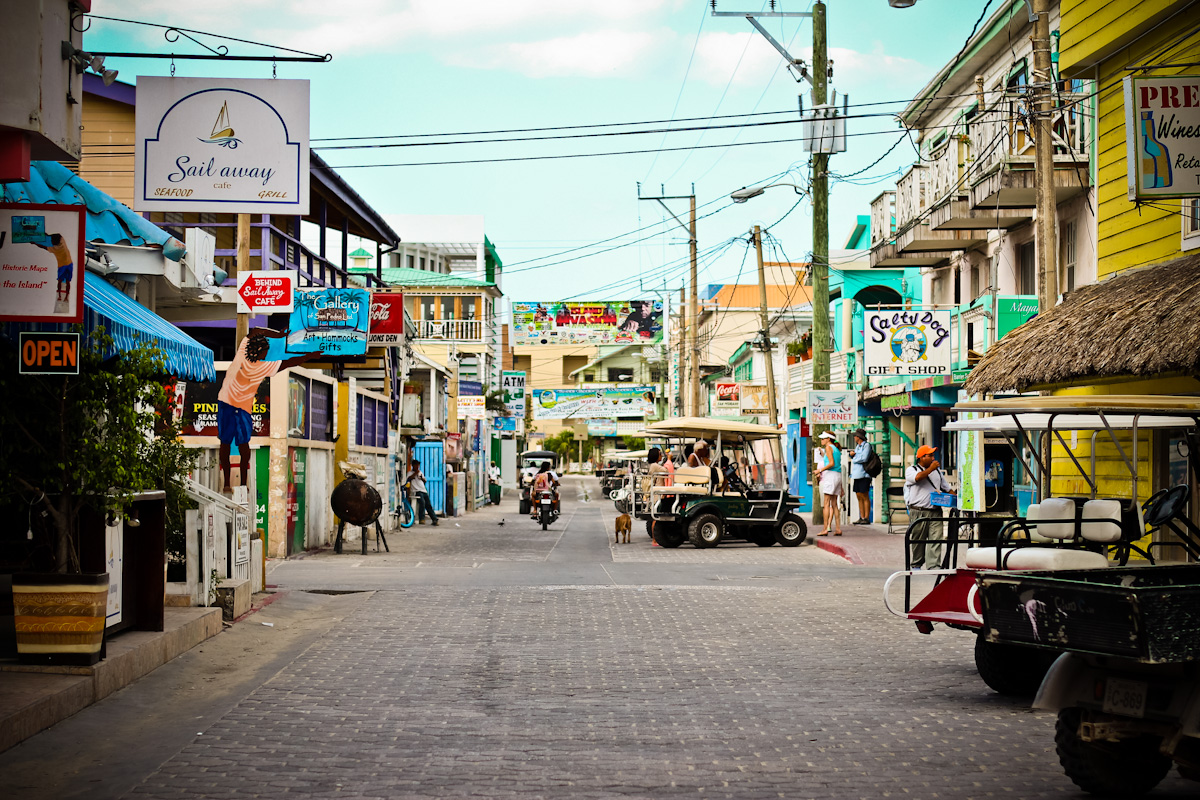
Main Street in San Pedro, Belize, looking north

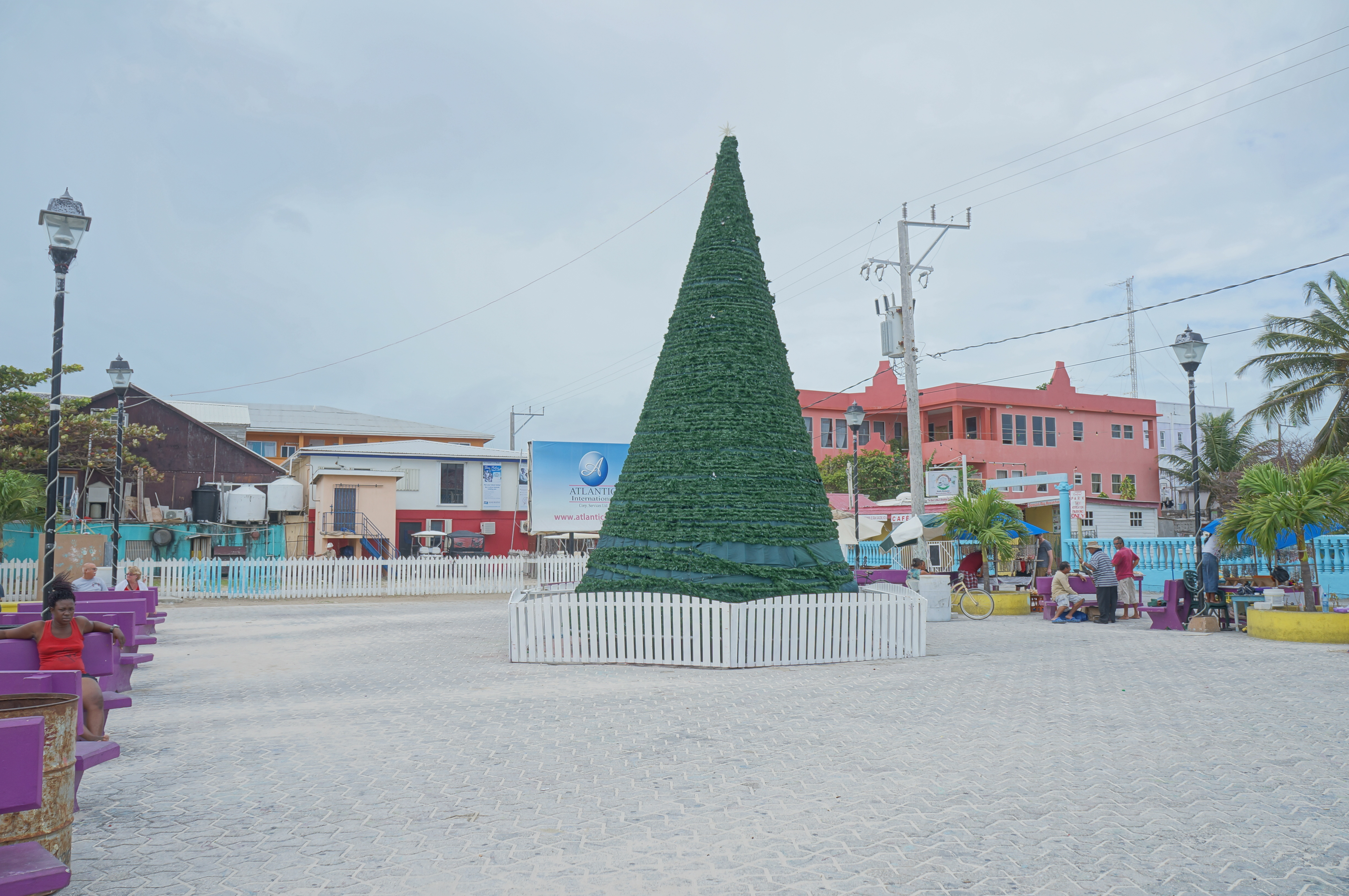
Central Park, San Pedro, Ambergris Caye, Belize

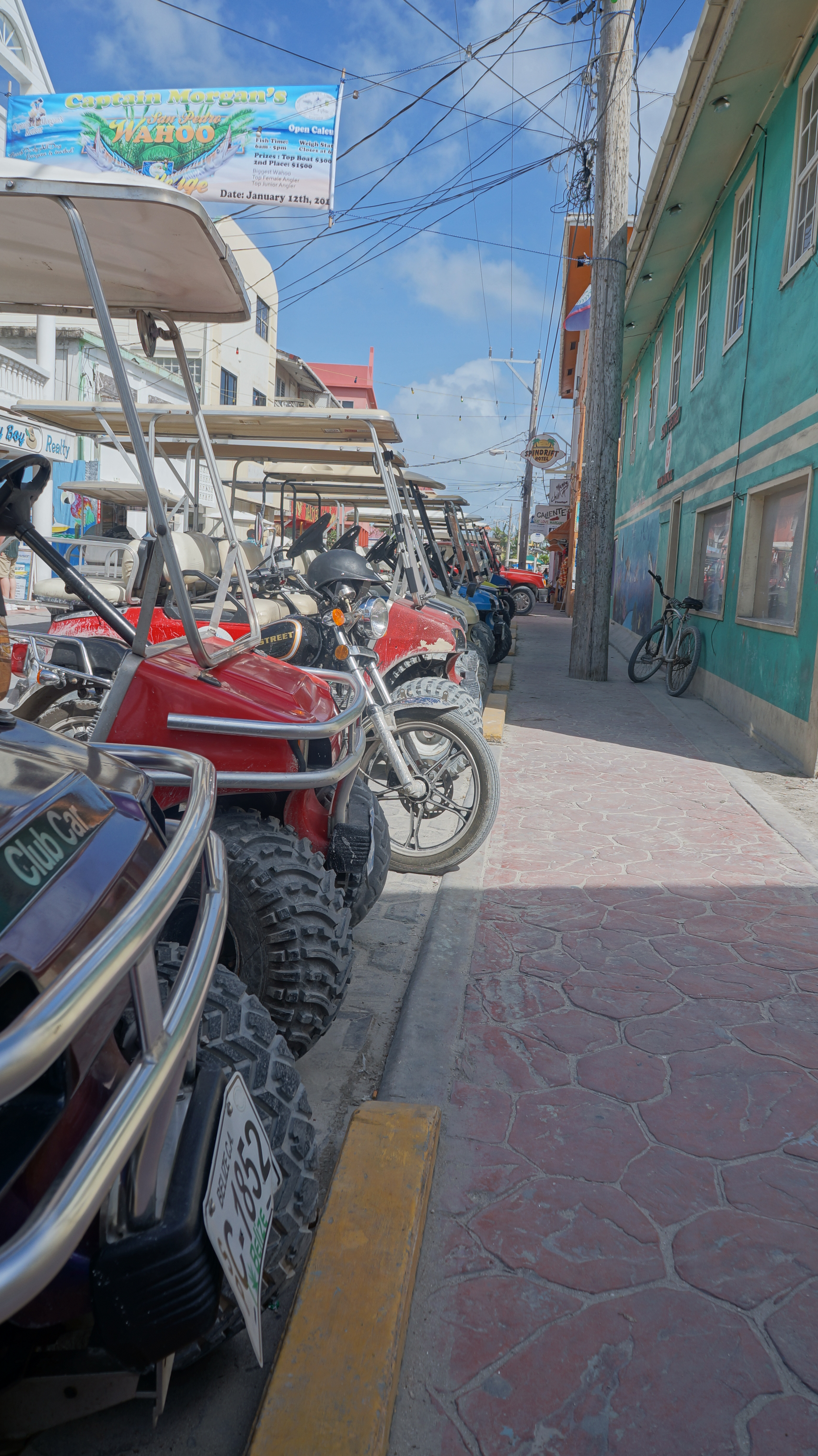
Golfcart parking lot, Main Street

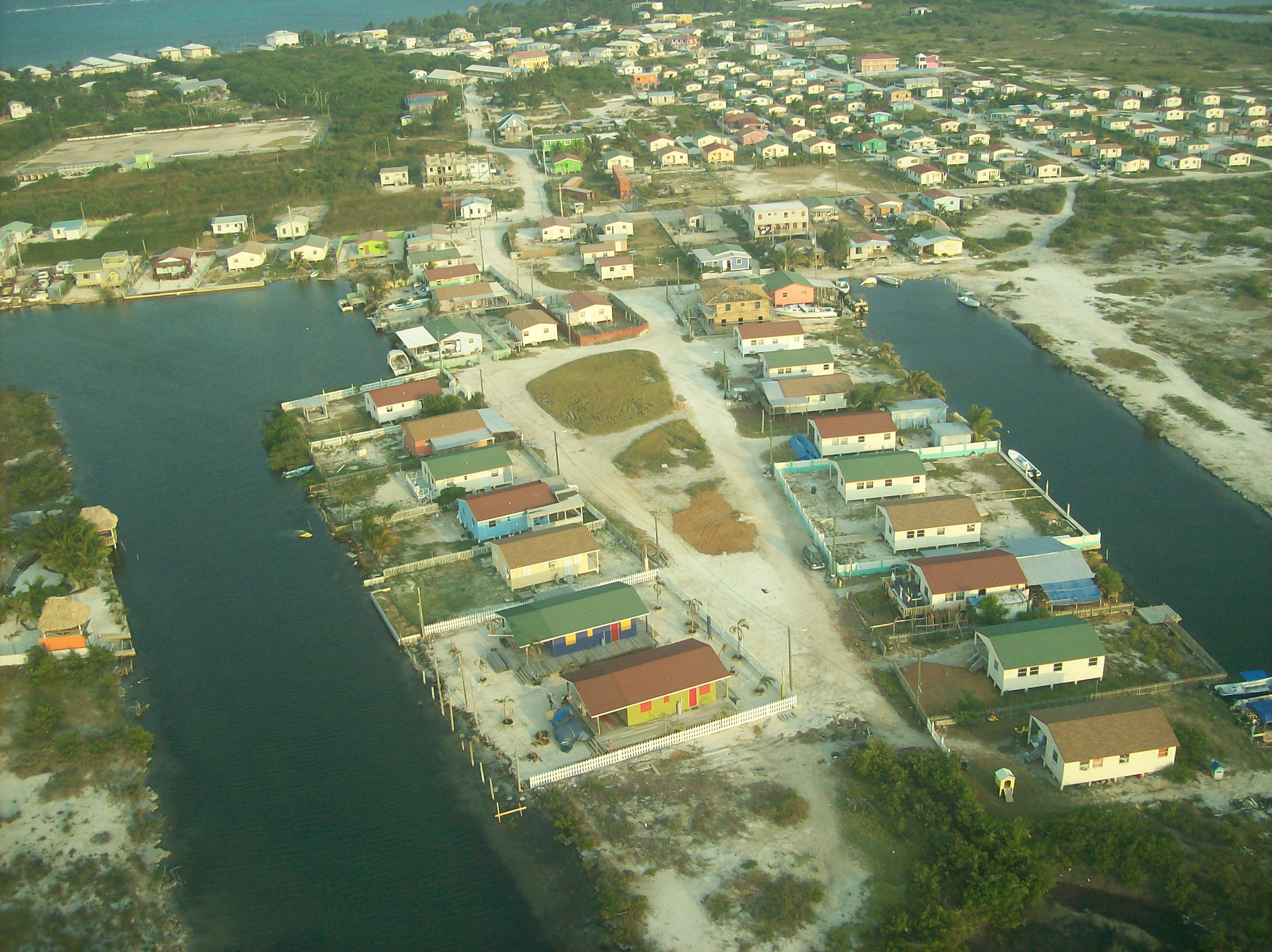
Houses in San Pedro
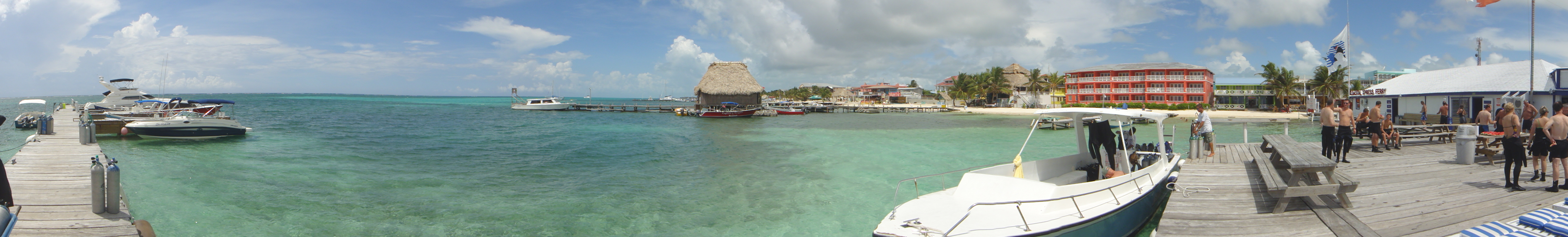
Panoramic view from Amigos del Mar Diving shop
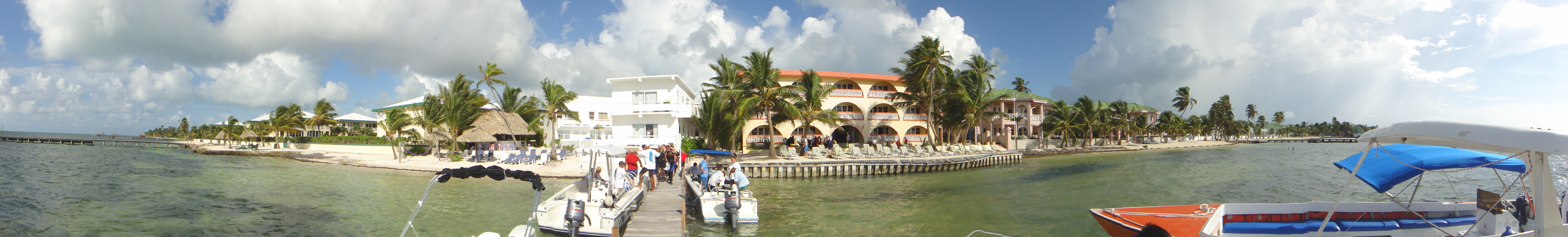
Panoramic view of Banana Beach Resort from dock

== Tourism ==
Over the centuries, San Pedro has become one of the most popular tourist destinations with protected areas such as Hol Chan Marine Reserve, Shark Ray Alley, Bacalarchico, and many more. One of San Pedro's most prized possessions is the Belize Barrier Reef. The San Pedro Barrier Reef is the 'second-largest' in the world, the first being the Great Barrier Reef. It is home to a diverse number of species.

One of the primary industries in the town is tourism, most notably scuba diving. So many visitors are divers that there are two hyperbaric decompression chambers on the island.

Ambergris Museum is in the town. The north road is over 10 miles long and has greatly expanded resort and beach house development with better access than only watercraft.

== Carnaval festival ==
Today San Pedro is known for festivals, one of the most famous being El Gran Carnaval de San Pedro.

El Gran Carnaval de San Pedro goes back to the 1870s, a tradition that is centered around “Juan Carnaval”. A legend states “Juan was an island god, that had sex with over a thousand women from eight different countries and had many children." It is said that he was stabbed to death by his hurt and jealous wife — leaving behind nothing but a will that is traditionally read on Ash Wednesday. A stuffed doll-like idol of Juan Carnaval is burnt every year as a symbol of cleansing the community's sins.

This tradition started out with the use of powder and has now expanded into water paint and the breaking of eggs. There are rules to this festival: The first day is restricted to children until 7 pm, from Ruby's Hotel beachfront to the cemetery area and the Barrier Reef Drive. They are not allowed to paint individuals who are not participating nor public signs, buildings, and the Comparsa participants. Lastly, they are not allowed to use rotten eggs, spray paint, or oil paints.

== Twin towns – sister cities ==
San Pedro Town is twinned with:

- Wilmington, North Carolina, United States (2007)

== See also ==
- El Gran Carnaval de San Pedro
