= Manuel Heredia =

Manuel Heredia may refer to:

- Manuel Heredia (footballer)
- Manuel Heredia (politician)
