= Ambergris Museum =

Archaeology museum in San Pedro Town, Belize

- Established: February 1998
- Location: San Pedro Town, Belize
- Coordinates: 17.471897°N 88.248479°W
- Type: Archaeology museum
- Website: ambergriscaye.com/museum/

Ambergris Museum is a Mesoamerican archaeology museum in San Pedro Town, Belize. It houses ancient Mayan civilization artifacts.

Ambergris Museum opened in February 1998. It covers the history of Ambergris Caye from early Mayan culture onwards.

It is currently closed and its official website states that it will reopen if it receives sufficient donations (as of September 22, 2023).
