= Psychédélices =

Studio album by Alizée
- Released: 23 November 2007
- Studios: Juno Studio (Paris); Wisteria Studios (Paris)
- Genres: French pop; electropop
- Length: 41:40
- Labels: RCA; Sony BMG; Wisteria Song
- Producers: Sylvian Carpentier; Jérémy Chatelain

Alizée chronology
Alizée en concert (2004)	Psychédélices (2007)	Tout Alizée (2007)

Singles from Psychédélices
- 1. "Mademoiselle Juliette" Released: 30 September 2007; 2. "Fifty-Sixty" Released: February 2008

Deluxe CD + DVD edition
- Deluxe cover

Psychédélices (English: Psych-delights) is the third studio album by French recording artist Alizée, released on 23 November 2007 by RCA Records. It was the first album without collaboration with Mylène Farmer and Laurent Boutonnat. It was certified gold by the SNEP in March 2008, denoting shipments in excess of 80,000 copies in France. It was also certified gold in Mexico in August 2008 for shipments of over 50,000 copies in that country. Psychédélices was released on streaming services on 30 August 2021. However, this version was removed from streaming services in early to mid-July 2022, and replaced with a remastered version on 22 July 2022.

== Background ==
After a four-year hiatus and a time out of the media limelight, Alizée returned in December 2007 with Psychédélices, the first one to be made without the creative supervision of her former mentor, Mylène Farmer. The album, which features 11 tracks, was made available for digital downloads 26 November 2007, with a full release on 3 December 2007 on the RCA label. The album includes collaborations with Bertrand Burgalat, Daniel Darc, Oxmo Puccino, Jérémy Chatelain, Michel-Yves Kochmann, and Jean Fauque.

== Promotion ==
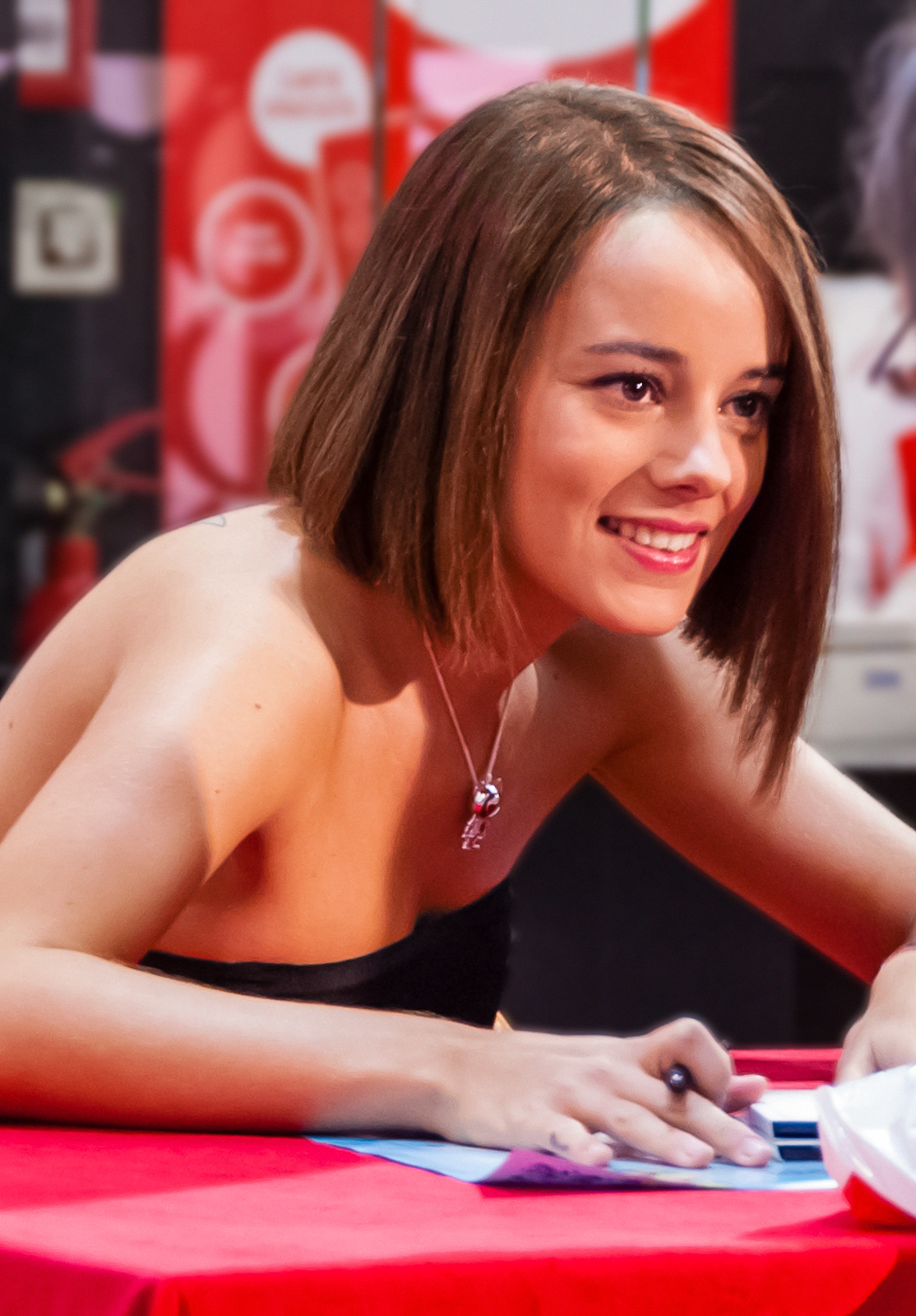
Alizée during a press event promoting Psychédélices

The first single extracted from the album was "Mademoiselle Juliette", officially released on 30 September 2007. It was accidentally released early on the Virgin Megastore website on 23 September 2007, but was taken down later citing an error on the part of Virgin Music, France. The single was later made available in online music stores as well as radio stations, and went on to capture the #13 spot on the legal music downloads charts. To promote the single, Alizée appeared on the French radio station, NRJ, on 27 September 2007. The video for the single was released for broadcast on 19 November 2007, though it was made available on MSN France on 16 November 2007. It was released on both CD and vinyl, on 21 January 2008.

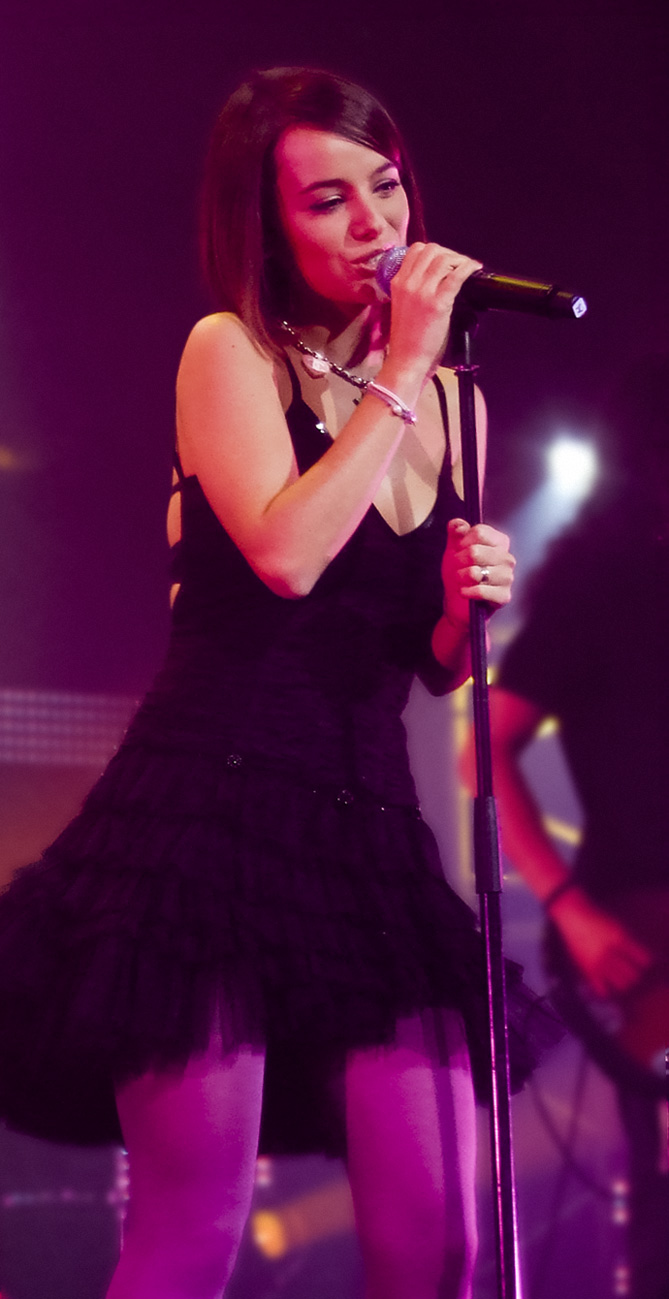
Alizée in concert in 2008

Another track from the album, "Fifty-Sixty", was leaked two months before the album was released. Though the song was not mentioned by name, the leak was confirmed in a press release which revealed the title and release schedule of the album. "Fifty-Sixty" later launched as the second single from the album in February 2008. The lyrics to "Fifty-Sixty" tell, in personal and metaphorical manner, of a young model under the guidance of Andy Warhol, possibly inspired by the real-life story of Edie Sedgwick. The song ends with a reiteration of how she foolishly believed Andy that she was the most beautiful model of all. Three music videos were released for the single – one for the album version of the song and the other two for two remixes. An Alizée website, Psychedeclips.com, was dedicated to the video series, the first of which was released on 5 May 2008.

Coinciding with the new album, a new official website was created, which, despite being announced on 11 September 2007, was kept under wraps until 28 November 2007. The album was also promoted via an official artist profile at MySpace. Advertising and marketing campaigns for the album began 22 November 2007 with ad campaigns on NRJ Radio, TF1-TV, and the web.

=== Tour ===
The Psychédélices Tour started in 2008, to promote Alizée's album. The tour was highly focused in Mexico, one of the countries where Alizée has experienced the most success. In 2008, she gave one performance in Russia and five in Mexico. A performance in Paris, France, on Le Grand Rex was cancelled, making this the only tour by Alizée that had no venues in France. She returned to Mexico in 2009 for one concert for San Marcos Fair, where she appeared as an international guest. The follow-up concert was not part of the actual tour and featured only a partial set list.

== Singles ==
"Mademoiselle Juliette" the song was released as the album's lead single 30 September 2007. A music video for the song directed by Julien Rotterman was released in November of that same year, and proved to be successful in Mexico. It reached position number 1 in MTV Latin America and position number 138 in a countdown of the 150 most important videos of the channel in the past 15 years. It reached position 22 in the chart of France Top 100 Singles and number 13 in the Top Download Singles chart. It also reached the top 45 in Russia and position 77 in Europe. "Fifty-Sixty" even though "Lilly Town" was planned as the second single, "Fifty-Sixty" was released as the album's second and last international single in February 2008. The song was inspired by the real-life story of Edie Sedgwick. A music video directed by Yanick Saillet was released to promote the single, and other two videos were produced to accompany two remixes of the song. However, "Fifty-Sixty" did not match the success of "Mademoiselle Juliette".

=== Other promotional singles ===
- "Lilly Town": The song was planned to be released as the third single from the album, but the record label decided to end the promotion of the album. However, the song did get a minimum release in Mexico. It was sent to Mexican radio stations in March 2008. It proved to be successful on Mexican radio stations, entering the chart of the most played songs.
- "La Isla Bonita": It was released as a promotional single to promote the World Tour Edition of the album. It was a cover of a Madonna song. The song was released as a promotional single in August 2008. It was her first top ten song on the Mexican national top ten airplay chart.

== Critical reception ==
Professional ratings
Review scores
Source	Rating
SACEM/SNEP	Positive
Stereology	9/10 stars
Mix Up (Mexico)	5/5 stars

Psychédélices was generally well received, and the reviews generated talk of Alizée's independent career after three and half years of musical inactivity and after leaving her former mentors Mylène Farmer and Laurent Boutonnat, while being a mother at the same time. It was also noticed that her style had become a little more mature.

== Track listing ==
No.	Title	Lyrics	Music	Length
1.	"Mademoiselle Juliette"	Jean Fauque · Jérémy Chatelain	Chatelain	3:02
2.	"Fifty-Sixty"	Fauque · Chatelain	Chatelain	3:45
3.	"Mon taxi driver"	Fauque	Chatelain	3:11
4.	"Jamais plus"	Daniel Darc	Frédéric Lo	3:28
5.	"Psychédélices"	Fauque	Chatelain	4:37
6.	"Décollage"	Oxmo Puccino	Kore · Chatelain	3:52
7.	"Par les paupières"	Puccino	Chatelain · Nellson · Sylvain Carpentier	4:29
8.	"Lilly Town"	Fauque · Chatelain	Chatelain	3:57
9.	"Lonely List"	Darc	Lo	3:55
10.	"Idéaliser"	Fauque · Chatelain	Chatelain	4:00
11.	"L'Effet"	Fauque	Bertrand Burgalat	3:44

=== CD+DVD Tour Edition ===
On 25 June 2008, Psychédélices CD+DVD Edition was released including bonus tracks, a DVD and new artwork. The tour edition was certified Gold for shipping 50,000 copies in its first week. The award was given to Alizée during an autograph session (the second of her career) in Mexico City on 26 June 2008.

CD
No.	Title	Lyrics	Music	Length
13.	"La Isla Bonita" (Madonna cover)	Madonna	Patrick Leonard · Bruce Gaitsch · Madonna	3:43
14.	"Fifty-Sixty" (Rolf Honey Remix)	Fauque · Chatelain	Chatelain	3:28
15.	"Mademoiselle Juliette" (Datsu Remix)	Fauque · Chatelain	Chatelain	3:28
16.	"Fifty-Sixty" (Edana Remix)	Fauque · Chatelain	Chatelain	3:26
17.	"Mademoiselle Juliette" (Bimbo Jones Remix)	Fauque · Chatelain	Chatelain	3:00

DVD
No.	Title	Length
16.	"Mademoiselle Juliette" (Music Video)	3:41
17.	"Fifty-Sixty La Trilogie" (Original Music Video, directed by Yannick Saillet and Chic & Artistic; David Rubato's Remix, directed by Rebecca Zlotowski and Art Direction by House of Kids; Rolf Honey's Remix, directed by Jihad Kahwajy)	10:52
18.	"Alizée en México" (Alizée's first four days in México during her first promotional visit in March 2008, courtesy by Prodigy/MSN México)	6:37

== Credits ==
Credits adapted from Psychédélices liner notes.

- Alizée – vocals, backing vocals (all tracks)
- Bertrand Burgalat – Bass, Percussion, Piano, Organ (Hammond), Fender Rhodes, Realization
- Elise Canepa – Assistant
- Sylvain Carpentier – Guitar, Percussion, Programming, Clavier, Engineer, Beat Box, Mixing, Realization
- Darius Scheider – Guitar
- Jeremy Chatelain – Piano, Programming, Clavier, Realization
- Maxine Garoute – Percussion, Drums, Juno, Guest Appearance
- Sébastien Gerbi – Engineer
- David Husser – Mixing
- Michel-Yves Kochmann – Melodica
- Anne LePape – Strings
- Frederic Lo – Guitar, Programming, Clavier, Engineer, Realization
- David Maurin – Drums
- Pascal Rode – Guitar

== Charts and commercial performance ==
The album was not considered a total commercial success in France, where it reached second place on the download charts and 16th place on the physical album sale charts. It was more successful in Mexico, where the stores put the album on sale three days earlier than the actual release date to avoid piracy, and with only three-day sales the album debuted in 44th place on the Mexican Top 100 Albums Chart and 14th place on the international chart. It peaked at 21st place on the main chart and third on the international chart in early December.

After falling down the Mexican charts, the album made a second appearance on the charts, reaching 15th place on the Top 100 and first place on the international albums chart. In 2008, the album ended as the 52nd-best selling album of the year in Mexico.

By June 2008, the album had sold over 200,000 copies worldwide.

=== Weekly charts ===
Chart (2007–08)	Peak position
Argentine Albums	19
Belgian Albums Chart (Wallonia)	50
French Albums Chart	5
French Digital Albums Chart	2
Mexican Albums Chart	15
Mexican International Albums Chart	1
Polish Albums Chart	13
Russian Albums Chart	14
Swiss Albums Chart	99

== Certifications ==
Region	Certification	Certified units/sales
France (SNEP)	Gold	75,000^{*}
Mexico (AMPROFON)	Gold	50,000^{^}
Russia (NFPF)	Gold	10,000^{*}
^{*} Sales figures based on certification alone.^{^} Shipments figures based on certification alone.

== Release history ==
Region	Date	Label	Format
France	23 November 2007	Sony BMG	Digital download
France	3 December 2007	Sony BMG	CD
France	3 December 2007	Sony BMG	CD/DVD
France	3 December 2007	Sony BMG	Vinyl
Mexico	23 November 2007	Sony BMG	CD
Switzerland	3 December 2007	Sony BMG	CD
Belgium	3 December 2007	Sony BMG	CD
Poland	28 January 2008	Sony BMG	CD
Germany	8 February 2008	Sony BMG	CD
UK	10 March 2008	Sony BMG	CD
Mexico	25 June 2008	RCA	CD/DVD
Worldwide	22 July 2022	La Pocket Factory	Digital download
France	March 2023	La Pocket Factory	CD/Vinyl
