= Glenn Godfrey =

Belizean politician (born 1948)

Attorney General of Belize
- In office 1989–1993
- Constituency: Belize Rural South

Member of the Belize House of Representatives for Belize Rural South
- In office 1989–1998

Personal details
- Born: 7 June 1948 (age 78)
- Citizenship: Belize
- Party: People's United Party (PUP)
- Education: Stanford University

Glenn Derick Godfrey S.C. (born 7 June 1949) is a Belizean politician, jurist and writer. He served as the Attorney General and Ministers of Tourism and Environment under prime minister George Cadle Price between 1989 and 1993. A member of the People's United Party (PUP) he served two terms in the Belize National Assembly from 1989 to 1998 representing the Belize Rural South constituency. He was also Honorary Consul of Finland to Belize from 2002 to 2012. He currently serves as the managing director of Glenn D. Godfrey & Co LLP.

== Politics ==
Godfrey was a member of the Belize National Assembly from 1989 to 1998. In the 1993 election, he ran in the constituency and won with 56.2% of the vote to Santiago Castillo of the UDP. In the 1989 Belize general election, he again ran for the PUP in the Belize Rural South constituency and won the election with 64.8% of the vote against Rudolph Thompson of the UDP. He served as Attorney General and Minister of Tourism and the Environment of Belize from 1989 to 1993, during which time, the Belize Asset Protection Trust Act passed.

== Business ==
Glenn D. Godfrey S.C. is Founding Member and Senior Partner of the Belize-based law firm, Glenn D. Godfrey & Company LLP. He is currently Senior Counsel of the Supreme Court of Belize, a post he was appointed to in March 1990.

== Education ==
Godfrey received a Bachelor of Arts Cum Laude in English Literature from Xavier University of Louisiana, New Orleans, Louisiana in March 1971. He was awarded a Master of Arts degree in English Literature by Stanford University, Palo Alto, California in 1974. Godfrey was a lecturer in English and Writer-in-Residence at Xavier University of Louisiana from 1973 to 1975. In 1977 Godfrey was awarded a Bachelor of Law degree by the Faculty of Law of the University of the West Indies, Cave Hill Campus, St. Michael, Barbados. He further was awarded a Certificate of Legal Education by the Norman Manley Law School, Mona, Jamaica in 1979 and was admitted to practice at the Bar of Belize that same year.

== Selected works ==
Selected works by Glenn D Godfrey

Historical

- Ambergris Caye : Paradise with a Past (1983) Cubola Productions
- Ambergris Caye History (1999) Cubola Productions

Fiction

- The Sinners' Bossanova (1987) Cubola Productions
- The Children Rescued from Original Sin (1974) Stanford University

== See also ==
- Politics of Belize
- Attorney-General of Belize
