= Belize Rural South =

- Constituency for the Belize House of Representatives
- District: Belize
- Electorate: 8,749 (2012)
- Major settlements: San Pedro Town

Current constituency
- Created: 1961
- Party: People's United Party
- Area Representative: Andre Perez

Belize Rural South is an electoral constituency in the Belize District represented in the House of Representatives of the National Assembly of Belize since 2020 by Andre Perez of the People's United Party (PUP).

== Founding and creation ==
The Rural South constituency was created for the 1961 general election as part of a major nationwide redistricting. Out of the 13 Belize District constituencies it is one of three located outside the Belize City limits. Belize Rural South consists of the offshore cayes (islands) of Belize District, including Ambergris Caye, Caye Caulker and St. George's Caye. San Pedro Town on Ambergris Caye is the constituency's main settlement.

Ever since the creation of Belize Rural Central in 1993, the name "Belize Rural South" has been something of a misnomer, as the constituency lies primarily to the north and east of the Belize District mainland. In 2012 it reported an electorate of 7,100, larger than any other Belize District constituency.

== Area representatives ==
Election	Area representative	Party
1961	Louis Sylvestre	PUP
1965	Louis Sylvestre	PUP
1969	Louis Sylvestre	PUP
1974	Louis Sylvestre	PUP
1979	Louis Sylvestre	PUP
1984	Louis Sylvestre	PUP
1989	Glenn Godfrey	PUP
1993	Glenn Godfrey	PUP
1998	Patty Arceo	PUP
2003	Manuel Heredia	UDP
2008	Manuel Heredia	UDP
2012	Manuel Heredia	UDP
2015	Manuel Heredia	UDP
2020	Andre Perez	PUP
2025	Andre Perez	PUP

== Elections ==
Election	Political result	Candidate	Party	Votes	%	±%
2025 general election Electorate: 10,149; Turnout: 5,767 (80.21 56.82%) −23.29	PUP hold Majority: 1,520 (26.35%) −1.86	Andre Perez	PUP	3,418	59.27	−4.57
2025 general election Electorate: 10,149; Turnout: 5,767 (80.21 56.82%) −23.29	PUP hold Majority: 1,520 (26.35%) −1.86	Manuel Heredia	UDP	1,898	32.91	-2.71
2025 general election Electorate: 10,149; Turnout: 5,767 (80.21 56.82%) −23.29	PUP hold Majority: 1,520 (26.35%) −1.86	Abner Bacab	Belizeans Justice Movement	159	2.76	-
2025 general election Electorate: 10,149; Turnout: 5,767 (80.21 56.82%) −23.29	PUP hold Majority: 1,520 (26.35%) −1.86	Lagha Mahmoud	UDP	110	1.91	-33.71
2020 general election Electorate: 8,586; Turnout: 6,887 (80.21%) +10.76	PUP gain from UDP; Majority: 1,917 (28.22%) +9.75	Andre Perez	PUP	4,336	63.84	+24.87
2020 general election Electorate: 8,586; Turnout: 6,887 (80.21%) +10.76	PUP gain from UDP; Majority: 1,917 (28.22%) +9.75	Manuel Heredia	UDP	2,419	35.62	-21.82
2020 general election Electorate: 8,586; Turnout: 6,887 (80.21%) +10.76	PUP gain from UDP; Majority: 1,917 (28.22%) +9.75	Thomas Henry Greenwood	Belize People's Front	37	0.54	-
2015 general election Electorate: 8,849; Turnout: 6,076 (69.45%) −0.79	UDP hold Majority: 1,122 (18.47%) +9.39	Manuel Heredia	UDP	3,490	57.44	+7.73
2015 general election Electorate: 8,849; Turnout: 6,076 (69.45%) −0.79	UDP hold Majority: 1,122 (18.47%) +9.39	Jose Eulogio Arceo	PUP	2,368	38.97	-1.66
2015 general election Electorate: 8,849; Turnout: 6,076 (69.45%) −0.79	UDP hold Majority: 1,122 (18.47%) +9.39	"Bobby" Robert Lopez	BPP	133	2.19	-4.47
2012 general election Electorate: 7,100; Turnout: 4,987 (70.24%) −3.71	UDP hold Majority: 453 (9.08%) −16.26	Manuel Heredia	UDP	2,479	49.71	−11.8
2012 general election Electorate: 7,100; Turnout: 4,987 (70.24%) −3.71	UDP hold Majority: 453 (9.08%) −16.26	Patty Arceo	PUP	2,026	40.63	+4.46
2012 general election Electorate: 7,100; Turnout: 4,987 (70.24%) −3.71	UDP hold Majority: 453 (9.08%) −16.26	"Bobby" Robert Lopez	VIP	332	6.66	-
2012 general election Electorate: 7,100; Turnout: 4,987 (70.24%) −3.71	UDP hold Majority: 453 (9.08%) −16.26	William "Mike" Campbell	Independent	24	0.48	-
2008 general election Electorate: 5,470; Turnout: 4,045 (73.95%) −6.68	UDP hold Majority: 1,025 (25.34%) +21.7	Manuel Heredia	UDP	2,488	61.51	+10.09
2008 general election Electorate: 5,470; Turnout: 4,045 (73.95%) −6.68	UDP hold Majority: 1,025 (25.34%) +21.7	Murlene "Mel" Spain	PUP	1,463	36.17	−11.61
2008 general election Electorate: 5,470; Turnout: 4,045 (73.95%) −6.68	UDP hold Majority: 1,025 (25.34%) +21.7	Ernesto Caliz	NRP	54	1.33	-
2003 general election Electorate: 3,712; Turnout: 2,993 (80.63%) −10.47	UDP gain from PUP; Majority: 109 (3.64%) −10.88	Manuel Heredia	UDP	1,539	51.42	+8.93
2003 general election Electorate: 3,712; Turnout: 2,993 (80.63%) −10.47	UDP gain from PUP; Majority: 109 (3.64%) −10.88	Patty Arceo	PUP	1,430	47.78	−9.23
1998 general election Electorate: 2,653; Turnout: 2,417 (91.1%) +10.45	PUP hold Majority: 351 (14.52%) +2.12	Patty Arceo	PUP	1,378	57.01	+0.81
1998 general election Electorate: 2,653; Turnout: 2,417 (91.1%) +10.45	PUP hold Majority: 351 (14.52%) +2.12	Manuel Heredia	UDP	1,027	42.49	−1.31
1993 general election Electorate: 2,218; Turnout: 1,789 (80.65%) +12.08	PUP hold Majority: 221 (12.4%) −19.2	Glenn Godfrey	PUP	1,005	56.2	−8.6
1993 general election Electorate: 2,218; Turnout: 1,789 (80.65%) +12.08	PUP hold Majority: 221 (12.4%) −19.2	Santiago Castillo	UDP	784	43.8	+10.6
1989 general election Electorate: 3,350; Turnout: 2,297 (68.57%) −1.53	PUP hold Majority: 727 (31.6%) +14.0	Glenn Godfrey	PUP	1,489	64.8	+7.2
1989 general election Electorate: 3,350; Turnout: 2,297 (68.57%) −1.53	PUP hold Majority: 727 (31.6%) +14.0	Rudolph Thompson	UDP	762	33.2	−6.8
1984 general election Electorate: 2,471; Turnout: 1,732 (70.1%) −17.84	PUP hold Majority: 305 (17.6%) −8.1	Louis Sylvestre	PUP	997	57.6	−4.2
1984 general election Electorate: 2,471; Turnout: 1,732 (70.1%) −17.84	PUP hold Majority: 305 (17.6%) −8.1	Jose Marin	UDP	692	40.0	+3.9
1979 general election Electorate: 2,280; Turnout: 2,005 (87.94%) +17.18	PUP hold Majority: 25.7% (−5.9)	Louis Sylvestre	PUP		61.8	−2.2
1979 general election Electorate: 2,280; Turnout: 2,005 (87.94%) +17.18	PUP hold Majority: 25.7% (−5.9)	Gaspar Lara	UDP		36.1	+3.7
1974 general election Electorate: 1,491; Turnout: 1,055 (70.76%) +0.34	PUP hold Majority: 31.6% (−26.3)	Louis Sylvestre	PUP		64.0	−13.9
1974 general election Electorate: 1,491; Turnout: 1,055 (70.76%) +0.34	PUP hold Majority: 31.6% (−26.3)	Harry Lawrence	UDP		32.4	-
1969 general election Electorate: 1,369; Turnout: 964 (70.42%) +7.77	PUP hold Majority: 57.9% (+14.5)	Louis Sylvestre	PUP		77.9	+7.6
1969 general election Electorate: 1,369; Turnout: 964 (70.42%) +7.77	PUP hold Majority: 57.9% (+14.5)	Allan Anderson	NIP		20.0	−6.9
1965 general election Electorate: 1,229; Turnout: 770 (62.65%) −11.59	PUP hold Majority: 43.4% (−22.3)	Louis Sylvestre	PUP		70.3	−11.0
1965 general election Electorate: 1,229; Turnout: 770 (62.65%) −11.59	PUP hold Majority: 43.4% (−22.3)	Phillip Gillett	NIP		26.9	+11.3
1961 general election Electorate: 1,052; Turnout: 781 (74.24%) n/a	PUP win Majority: 65.7% (n/a)	Louis Sylvestre	PUP		81.3	-
1961 general election Electorate: 1,052; Turnout: 781 (74.24%) n/a	PUP win Majority: 65.7% (n/a)	Todd Brown	NIP		15.6	-
