= La Isla Bonita =

1987 single by Madonna

Single by Madonna

from the album True Blue
- Released: February 25, 1987
- Studio: Channel Recording
- Genre: Latin pop
- Length: 4:03
- Label: Sire; Warner Bros.
- Songwriters: Madonna; Patrick Leonard; Bruce Gaitsch
- Producers: Madonna; Patrick Leonard

Madonna singles chronology
| "Open Your Heart" (1986) | "La Isla Bonita" (1987) | "Who's That Girl" (1987) |

Music video
- "La Isla Bonita" on YouTube

"La Isla Bonita" (Spanish: [la ˈisla βoˈnita], lit. 'The Beautiful Island') is a song by American singer Madonna from her third studio album, True Blue (1986). Initially composed as an instrumental demo by Patrick Leonard and Bruce Gaitsch, later developed by Madonna, who added lyrics and co-produced it with Leonard. Marking her first foray into Latin pop, the song features flamenco guitar, Latin percussion, maracas, and several lines sung in Spanish. The lyrics reference an island called San Pedro, whose location remains ambiguous; Madonna described the song as a tribute to Latin American people.

Released on February 25, 1987, as the fifth and final single from True Blue, "La Isla Bonita" received positive reviews from music critics, who praised its melody, production, and romantic tone. It became a commercial success, reaching number four on the Billboard Hot 100 in the United States. Internationally, it reached number one in Austria, Canada, Ecuador, France, Switzerland, the United Kingdom, and West Germany, and became Europe's top-charting single of the year. The track has since appeared on several Madonna compilation albums, including The Immaculate Collection (1990) and Celebration (2009), and has been cited as an influence on the work of later artists.

The accompanying music video, directed by Mary Lambert, features Madonna in dual roles: a reserved Catholic woman and a flamboyant flamenco dancer. Its portrayal of Hispanic themes drew both praise and criticism, with some accusing the singer of cultural appropriation. "La Isla Bonita" is one of Madonna's most performed songs, having been included on eight of her concert tours, the last being the Celebration Tour (2023–2024). It has been covered, sampled, or referenced by various artists, including Laura Pausini, Alizée, Ricky Martin, and the Black Eyed Peas.

== Background and release ==
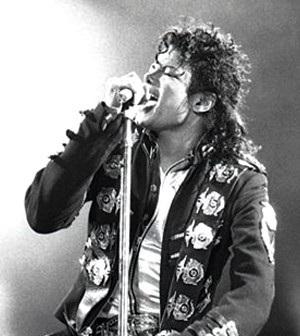
The instrumental demo of "La Isla Bonita" was first offered to Michael Jackson (pictured in 1988.)

In the fall of 1985, Madonna began writing and recording songs for her third studio album, True Blue. She began collaborating with Patrick Leonard, who had served as musical director on the Virgin Tour. Prior to working with Madonna, Leonard had contributed to the Jacksons' 1984 Victory Tour and remained in contact with Michael Jackson and producer Quincy Jones. At their request, he composed a series of instrumental demos, including one intended to resemble the style of Sade; the piece was presented to Jackson and Jones but ultimately turned down.

Leonard later brought the demo to Madonna at the start of the True Blue sessions, and she began developing it further. She conceived the title "La Isla Bonita" —which translates to "The Beautiful Island"— and wrote the lyrics while filming Shanghai Surprise (1986) in Hong Kong. Musician Bruce Gaitsch, who worked on the track, was initially skeptical of the title, deeming it "uncommercial". Madonna described the song as a tribute to the "beauty and mystery" of Latin American people. She explained that she had long been influenced by Latin music, particularly salsa and merengue, which she frequently heard while living in New York City. She added that both she and Leonard believed they had been Latin "in another life", as Latin rhythms often shaped their uptempo compositions. The two would later return to Latin-inspired styles on songs such as "Who's That Girl" (1987), and "Spanish Eyes" from Like a Prayer (1989).

"La Isla Bonita" was released as the fifth and final single from True Blue on February 25, 1987. The single's inner sleeve featured Madonna wearing an embroidered bolero jacket. The song was later included on the compilation albums The Immaculate Collection (1990) and Celebration (2009), and added as a bonus track on the Japanese edition of Something to Remember (1995).

== Composition and lyrics ==
"La Isla Bonita"
20-second sample of "La Isla Bonita", a song characterized by Latin-inspired instrumentation including flamenco guitar, Latin percussion, and maracas. One verse references an island named San Pedro by name.

"La Isla Bonita" was written and produced by Madonna and Patrick Leonard, with additional composition by Bruce Gaitsch. It was recorded at Channel Recording Studios, along with the rest of the True Blue album, and later mixed at Master Control. Leonard handled keyboard arrangements and programming, Gaitsch played guitar, and percussion was provided by Paulinho da Costa, with background vocals by Siedah Garrett and Edie Lehmann. Musically, it has been described as a Latin pop dance ballad with influences from bossa nova. Author Mary Cross said it marked a shift in Madonna's sound and ambience, combining flamenco guitar, Latin percussion, maracas, and electronic elements, with four lines sung in Spanish. To ensure accurate translations, Madonna and Leonard talked over the phone with a Hispanic housekeeper.

Lyrically, the song portrays Madonna as a "humble observer" longing for an imaginary island. The lyrics evoke a tropical paradise, with references to the "tropical island breeze" and "nature wild and free". The track opens with bongos and castanets, leading into the line "¿Cómo puede ser verdad?" ("How can it be true?"). In the first verse, she sings: "Last night I dreamt of San Pedro/Just like I'd never gone, I knew the song." The exact location of San Pedro has been debated, with Cuba, Puerto Rico, Belize, and the Dominican Republic among the suggested possibilities. San Pedro Town in Ambergris Caye, Belize has embraced the association, with local tourism adopting the nickname "La Isla Bonita".

Madonna later clarified in a Rolling Stone interview that the name had no specific geographic basis, saying, "I may have been on the way to the studio and seen an exit ramp for San Pedro". Authors Eduardo Viñuela, Igor Paskual and Lara González have pointed out that although the song incorporates elements of Spanish music such as flamenco, it also references Brazilian samba, suggesting the island is a fictitious "utopic" place rather than a real location. Spanish broadcaster Los 40 similarly described the lyrics as a tribute to the "Latin community from New York [Madonna] has always been close to", rather than the literal description of a place.

In 2014, while working on her thirteenth studio album Rebel Heart (2015), Madonna recorded a dubplate version of "La Isla Bonita" with producer Diplo. This reinterpretation replaced the original's Latin rhythms with dancehall beats and included new lyrics referencing Major Lazer. The version premiered on BBC Radio 1Xtra in March 2015.

== Critical reception ==
"La Isla Bonita" received generally positive reviews, with both contemporary and retrospective critics ranking it among Madonna's strongest and most romantic songs. (Note: Attributed to multiple references) John Leland of Spin described it as "spunky", while Jan DeKnock from the Chicago Tribune called it "charming". Creem's Ken Barnes opined that while not as impactful as Madonna's previous single "Open Your Heart", its "lilting (yet reflective) quality" elevated it beyond "south-of-the-border clichés". William McKeen, in Rock and Roll Is Here to Stay: An Anthology, drew comparisons to the Drifters' "Up on the Roof" (1962), noting its tranquil tone and lyrical theme of escapism. Stephen Thomas Erlewine of The A.V. Club highlighted its "breezy charm" and evocation of a "fantasy of an extended tropical vacation". Chuck Arnold from Entertainment Weekly praised it as "one of the loveliest tunes [Madonna] has ever done", while Dawn Keetley, writing in Public Women, Public Words, described it as "smooth, transparent" and one of the singer's "most perfect" songs. Daryl Easlea, in Madonna: Blond Ambition, argued that "La Isla Bonita" and the other singles from True Blue were so strong that they overshadowed the rest of the album.

The song's production was a frequent topic of discussion among critics. Paul Schrodt of Slant Magazine credited the arrangement with adding "dynamism" to Madonna's music, helping dispel early assumptions that she was "simply a Danceteria pop tart". David Browne of Entertainment Weekly called it a "perfectly conceived pop record". Newsday's Wayne Robins described "La Isla Bonita" as an "enigmatic Latin fantasy" with a melody so resilient it could be interpreted across genres —from a Ruben Blades arrangement to a street-corner doo-wop rendition. Sebastián E. Alonso from Spanish website Jenesaispop praised its "beautiful" refrain and "heavenly" bridge, highlighting Madonna's warm and serene vocal delivery. Madonna's vocal performance was also highlighted by other critics: AllMusic's Stuart Mason and Billboard's Bianca Gracie both singled it out as a strength, and Matthew Rettenmund wrote that she imbued the track with "immediacy and unimpeachable emotion". Cash Box magazine said that her "sensuous, teasing" vocals complemented the song's "provocative" feel.

There were critics who offered mixed to negative commentary. Tom Breihan of Stereogum described "La Isla Bonita" as "pure risible kitsch" and a "clumsy fetishization of an exoticized culture". However, he also acknowledged it as "one of the swooniest jams in a career full of swoony jams". John Quayle of the Observer–Reporter felt the track would have better suited Sade than Madonna. Matthew Jacobs of HuffPost described the song as middling in tempo and requiring a specific mood to be appreciated, while Wendy Tuohy of The Age likened it to a "commercial sleeping pill [rather than] a 'Spanish lullaby'". Eleni P. Austin of The Desert Sun dismissed "La Isla Bonita" as cheesy, and David Bauder from the Associated Press found it forgettable and criticized its inclusion on The Immaculate Collection. Roque Casciero of Argentinean newspaper Página 12 called it Madonna's "worst hit".

== Commercial performance ==
In the United States, "La Isla Bonita" debuted at number 49 on the Billboard Hot 100 on March 21, 1987, becoming Madonna's eleventh consecutive single to earn the title of the week's highest new entry —a streak that began with "Lucky Star" in 1984. By April 25, it had ascended to the top ten, tying Madonna with Michael Jackson for twelve consecutive top-ten hits, beind only Lionel Richie's thirteen. It ultimately peaked at number four on May 2, marking her eleventh top-five hit, a tally surpassed at the time only by the Beatles and Elvis Presley. The track also became the fifth top-five single from True Blue, making the album the second by a female artist to yield five top-five hits, after Janet Jackson's Control (1986).

On Billboard's Adult Contemporary chart, the single entered at number 31 on April 4 and reached the first spot over a month later, becoming Madonna's second chart-topper in the format after "Live to Tell" (1986). The single also topped the Hot Dance/Disco 12-inch Singles Sales chart, with sales of 75,000 copies reported by July 1987. "La Isla Bonita" placed at number 58 on the Billboard year-end Hot 100 chart and number 34 on the Adult Contemporary year-end chart. As of August 2024, Billboard ranked it as Madonna's 23rd most successful Hot 100 entry. In Canada, the song debuted at number 74 on the RPM Top 100 and reached number one on June 6, 1987, after a ten-week climb. It became Madonna's sixth number-one hit in the nation, and her fourth from True Blue. The track would later rank at number 22 on the magazine's year-end chart. It also reached number four in Panama City and number one in Santiago de Chile.

In the UK singles chart, "La Isla Bonita" debuted at number five on April 4, 1987, and climbed to number one three weeks later, spending two weeks at the summit and eleven weeks overall. It became Madonna's fourth UK number-one single. According to the Hull Daily Mail, it sold only 50,000 copies the week it reached the top, making it the lowest-selling UK number one in five years. The single was certified gold by the British Phonographic Industry (BPI) for shipments of over 400,000 units, with total sales reported at 421,760 as of 2008. In France, it became Madonna's first chart-topper, spending three weeks at number one and earning a gold certification from the Syndicat National de l'Édition Phonographique (SNEP) for 500,000 units sold; total sales exceed 620,000 copies. Elsewhere in Europe, the song reached number one in Switzerland, West Germany, and Austria. It topped the European Hot 100 Singles chart on the week of June 13, 1987, and became the continent's biggest single of the year. It also charted within the top ten in Ireland, Norway, the Netherlands, Sweden, and Spain.

== Music video ==
=== Background and synopsis ===
In the music video, Madonna portrays two contrasting characters: a devout Catholic woman and a "flamboyant" flamenco dancer, the latter described as such by author Mark Bego.

The music video for "La Isla Bonita" was directed by Mary Lambert, who had previously collaborated with Madonna on the clips for "Borderline" and "Like a Virgin" (both 1984), as well as "Material Girl" (1985). Filmed in downtown Los Angeles with three sets within four days, the shoot was described as "simple" by producer Sharon Oreck in her book Video Slut (2010). More than 500 extras of Hispanic descent were featured, including a then-unknown Benicio del Toro, who played a teenager sitting on a car hood and was paid $150 for his appearance. Percussionist Paulinho da Costa appears in the opening sequence playing bongos.

Set in a barrio, the narrative features Madonna in dual roles: a pious Catholic woman, and a vibrant flamenco dancer. The Catholic character is shown lighting candles in a sparsely furnished apartment —its cold-toned walls adorned with black-and-white photographs of Hispanic individuals and religious figures. She wears a plain white petticoat and quietly watches a street musician from her window. In contrast, the flamenco dancer performs expressively in a candlelit room adorned with a large image of the Sacred Heart. She wears a red polka-dot dress with a décolletage neckline and a skirt parted down the middle. Her hair is done in a Spanish-style netted bun, accented with a red carnation flower. As the video progresses, a street celebration begins, with Hispanic families and couples dancing to live music. The dancer eventually joins the festivities.

Premiering on MTV on March 6, 1987, the video became the most requested on the network for 20 consecutive weeks —a record at the time. It became the year's most heavily rotated music video on European television. "La Isla Bonita" was later included in Madonna's video compilations The Immaculate Collection (1990) and Celebration: The Video Collection (2009).

=== Analysis and reception ===
The music video for "La Isla Bonita" has been analyzed for its use of cultural imagery and symbolism. Author Victoria Chow and Vanity Fair España contributor Juan Sanguino identified the video as a turning point in Madonna's career, marking her first prominent use of cultural elements not her own. While Chow noted the shift neutrally, Sanguino criticized the portrayal as cultural appropriation, arguing that the singer resembled a "drunken tart at the Feria de Abril" rather than an actual flamenco dancer. Eduardo Viñuela, writing for the Instituto Cervantes at Harvard University, expressed similar concerns, describing the video as a mismatched blend of Latin American and Spanish elements. He argued it blurred cultural lines and relied on "deterritorialized clichés" to construct a "fantasy" aimed at US audiences. According to Viñuela, this approach would later appear in other Latin crossover hits by English-speaking artists. He cited examples such as the flamenco and Romani mix in Jennifer Lopez's "Ain't It Funny" (2001), the use of Andean instruments in Shakira's "Whenever, Wherever" (2001), and the Middle Eastern melodic influences in Ricky Martin's "Jaleo" (2003). Other perspectives were more favorable. A blogger quoted by journalist Caroline Sullivan compared Madonna's use of Spanish and Latin imagery in the video to her LGBTQ championing, arguing that it benefited American audiences by providing a window into traditions and cultures that had previously received little to no mainstream exposure.

Debate has also focused on how the video's imagery positions Madonna. Scholars Santiago Fouz-Hernández and Freya Jarman-Ivens argued that the video reinforced stereotypes of Hispanics and Latinos as carefree and musical, set against a backdrop of poverty. Madonna, they observed, remained visually and socially apart from this setting —either watching from above or briefly joining the festivities before leaving. In Media Culture: Cultural Studies, Identity, and Politics Between the Modern and the Postmodern, Douglas Kellner viewed the video more favorably, suggesting that Madonna's romanticized use of Hispanic fashion and imagery broadened her mainstream appeal. Fouz-Hernández and Jarman-Ivens also highlighted the contrast between the singer's dual roles in the video — the Catholic woman symbolizing austerity and passivity, and the flamenco dancer representing passion and agency.

A symbolic and spiritual interpretation has also been proposed. In the chapter "The Madonna Triptych: A Mystical Reading of Three Early Music Videos" from Music and Culture in the Middle Ages and Beyond: Liturgy, Sources, Symbolism, author Andrew Tomasello argued that the video cast the titular island as a metaphor for Paradise and eternal life. The opening lyric, "¿Cómo puede ser verdad?" ("How can it be true?"), signals a mystical narrative. Tomasello analyzed the video as part of a triptych with "Like a Virgin" and "Like a Prayer" (1989) —visuals also directed by Lambert— each exploring Madonna's symbolic journey through Italian, Spanish, and African-American cultures, respectively. In this reading, the three videos portray a spiritual journey culminating in a metaphorical Promised Land.

The costuming in the video has also been recognized. The red flamenco dress is considered one of Madonna's defining fashion moments. Author Lucy O'Brien deemed it "as iconic as the boy toy or the black corseted siren" in her biography of the singer, an opinion echoed by People magazine writers Cara Lynn Shultz and Aaron Parsley, who ranked it among her "most unforgettable" looks. Daily News and Analysis likewise called it one of her most iconic ensembles, while Entertainment Weekly noted it as a key moment in her "fashion evolution". "La Isla Bonita" was named one of Madonna's "most stylish" music videos by The New Zealand Herald's Dan Ahwa. Vogue España's María Mérida credited the video with shaping the aesthetics of "electro-latino" style through its use of ruffles, fitted tops, baroque jewelry, and cropped jackets.

Rolling Stone staff praised the video for its theatricality, but Miami Herald critic Ryan Murphy dismissed it as "lame, overdone, [and] almost absurd", especially disliking the closing street-dance sequence. Rikky Rooksby, in The Complete Guide to the Music of Madonna, commented that the video was "marginally more interesting" than the song. "La Isla Bonita" was named Madonna's 34th and 20th best music video by TheBacklot.com's Louis Virtel and Slant Magazine's Sal Cinquemani, respectively, while Mike Neid of MRC ranked it 16th. As of April 2026, it is her most-viewed video on YouTube, having surpassed one billion views.

== Live performances ==
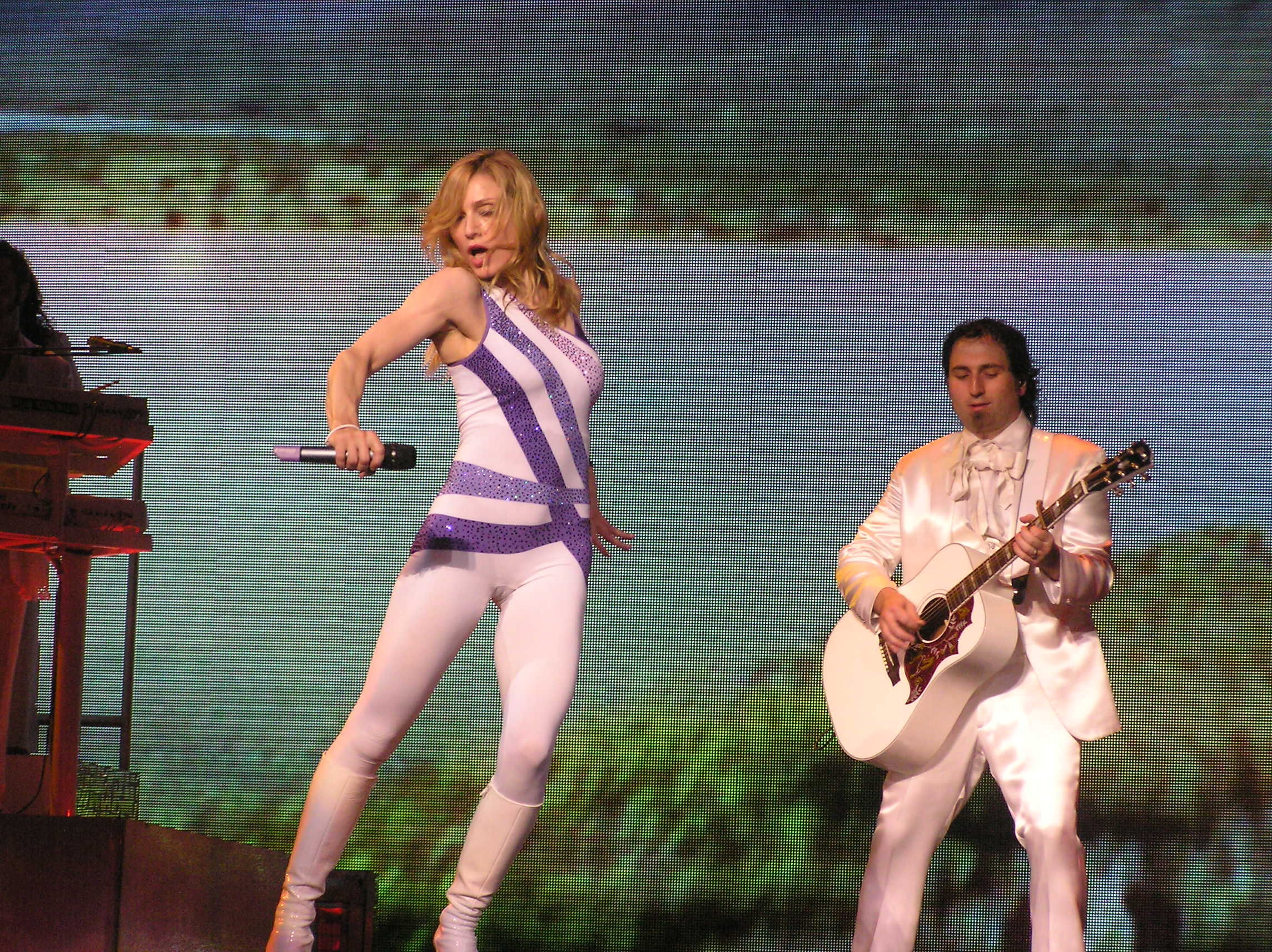
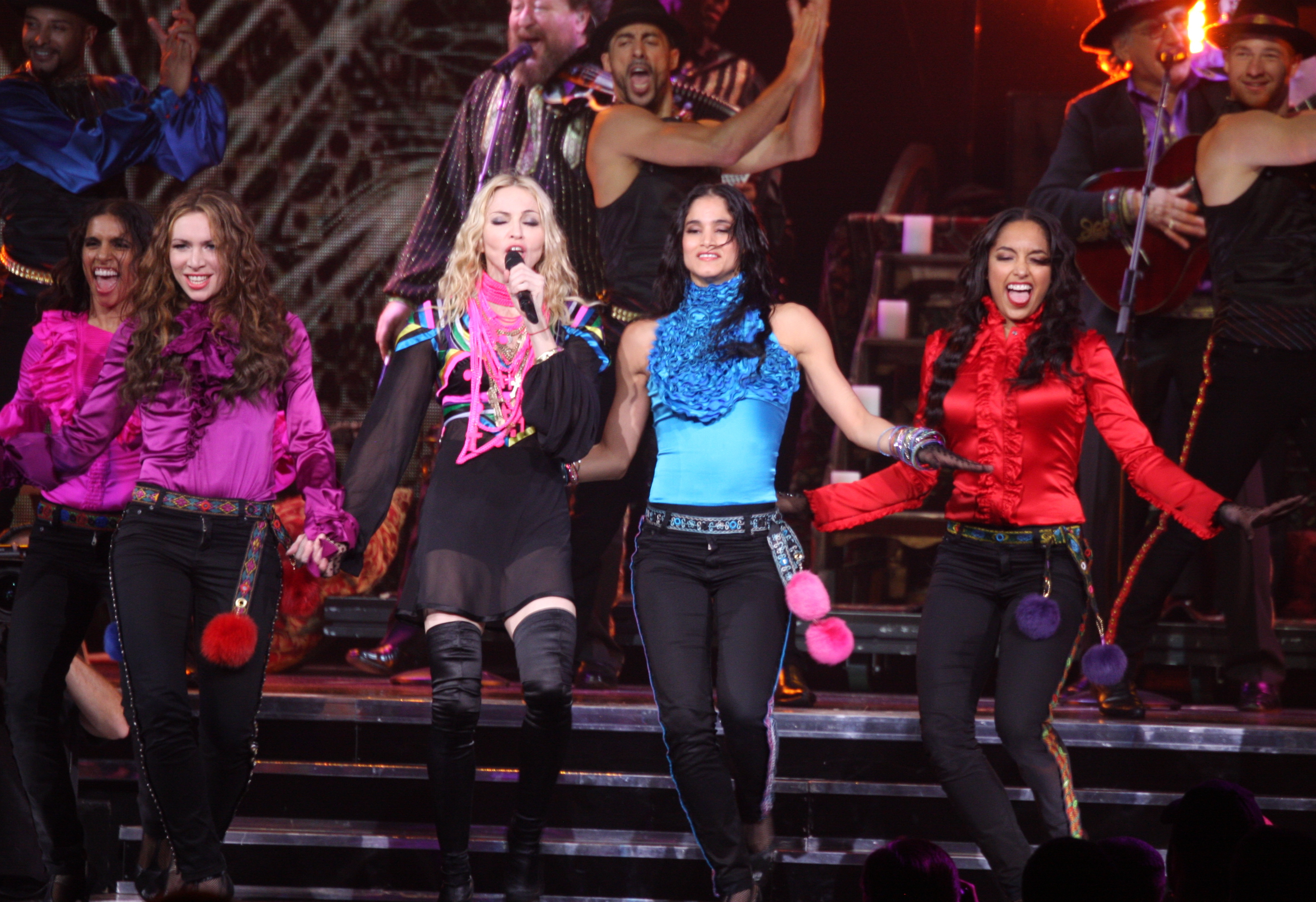
The performances of "La Isla Bonita" on the Confessions (top) and Sticky & Sweet tours (bottom)

"La Isla Bonita" is one of Madonna's most performed songs, having been included in eight of her concert tours: Who's That Girl (1987), the Girlie Show (1993), Drowned World (2001), Confessions (2006), Sticky & Sweet (2008–2009), Rebel Heart (2015–2016), Madame X (2019–2020), and Celebration (2023–2024). During the Who's That Girl Tour, the stage was transformed into a "Spanish fantasy" with Madonna dressed in a flamenco-style cabaret outfit, flanked by dancers portraying matadors. Jon Pareles of The New York Times described her as a "tropical temptress" during the number. A performance from this tour was included on the video release Ciao Italia: Live from Italy (1988).

The Girlie Show's performance had Madonna in sailor-inspired attire, including a striped top and bandana, while dancers dressed as seamen. The number included a playful moment where she pretended to faint and was carried offstage. The Baltimore Sun's J. D. Considine praised the chemistry between the singer and her backing band during the performance. A rendition from the Sydney concert was featured in The Girlie Show: Live Down Under (1994) video release.

"La Isla Bonita" was one of only two tracks from Madonna's 1980s catalogue performed on the Drowned World Tour. It was presented as an acoustic flamenco number, with Madonna in a backless dress, accompanied by percussionists and dancers. She also played guitar for the performance, which Alex Needham of NME described as a turning point in the show, pointing out that "[she] finally seems relaxed". The rendition from the Detroit concert on August 26 was released on the tour's video release.

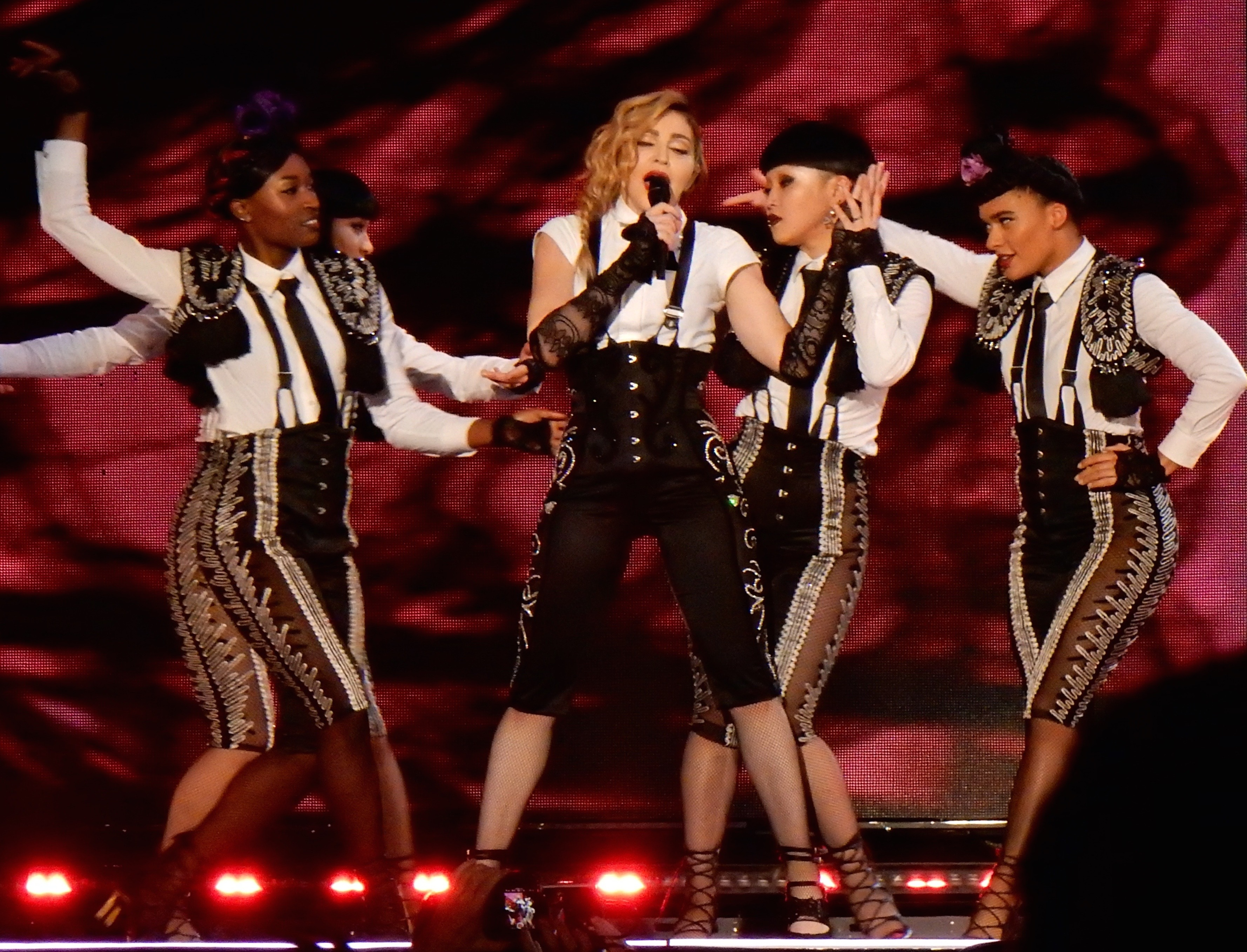
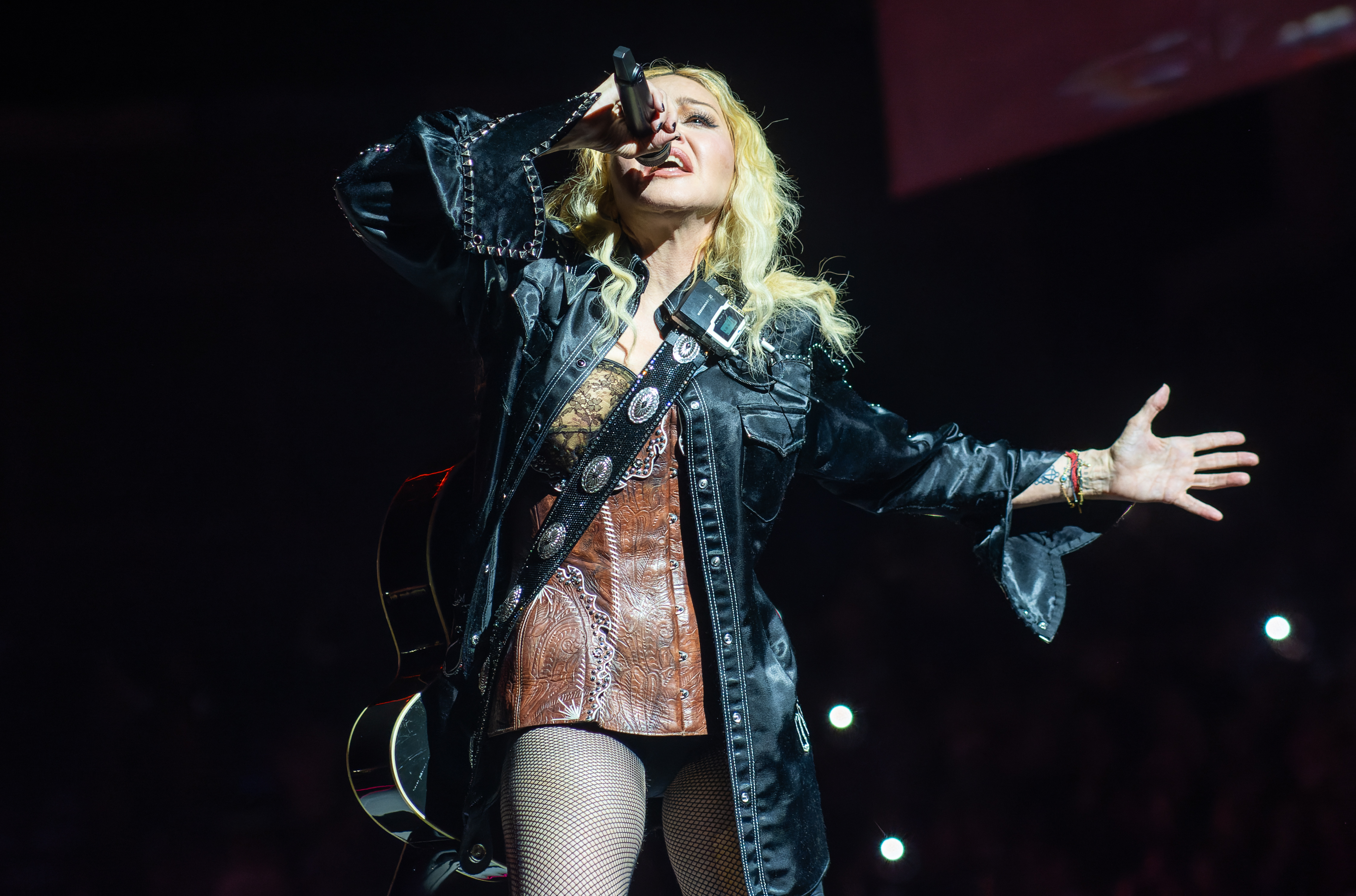
Madonna singing the song on the Rebel Heart (top) and Celebration tours (bottom)

For the Confessions Tour, the song was reinterpreted with disco elements. Madonna wore a white leotard, performing in front of colorful island-themed visuals that Slant Magazine's Ed Gonzalez said matched the "voluptuousness" of her choreography. One of the performances at London's Wembley Arena was included on the tour's live album (2007). In 2007, she collaborated with gypsy punk band Gogol Bordello for a "crazed hoedown" version at the London Live Earth concert. The gypsy theme carried over into the Sticky & Sweet Tour, where "La Isla Bonita" was mashed up with Gogol Bordello's "Lela Pala Tute" and reimagined with fiddles, accordions, and Romani musicians, including the Ukrainian group Kolpakov Trio. The Denver Post described it as the tour's "brightest, boldest, most daring moment". A performance from Buenos Aires was captured for the tour's live album (2010).

On the Rebel Heart Tour, "La Isla Bonita" was arranged as a flamenco piece featuring "stomps, claps, and shouts", as noted by The Hollywood Reporter's Ashley Lee. Madonna wore matador-inspired attire adorned with Swarovski crystals. Pitchfork's T. Cole Rachel highlighted the track as one of "deafening arena-sized sing-alongs". The performance was included on the tour's 2017 live album. She also performed the song at Leonardo DiCaprio's annual fundraising gala in Saint-Tropez in 2017.

The Madame X Tour featured Madonna as a Lisbon nightclub hostess, performing a cha-cha-chá mashup of "La Isla Bonita" and a song titled "Welcome to My Fado Club". She altered the lyrics to "my Portuguese lullaby". Kelli Skye Fadroski of the Los Angeles Daily News opined she "soared" through the performance. It was included in the 2021 concert film Madame X. On October 9, 2021, Madonna delivered a lounge-style rendition of the song during a private event at Marcus Samuelsson's Red Rooster restaurant in Harlem, performing it alongside Madame X (2019) album track "Dark Ballet" and the Cape Verdean coladeira song "Sodade". Madonna sang "La Isla Bonita" on the Celebration Tour, where it was mashed up with "Don't Cry for Me Argentina" (1996), accompanied by her son David Banda on guitar. Variety's Mark Sutherland called it a number of "sheer, irresistible pizazz".

== Covers and use in popular media ==
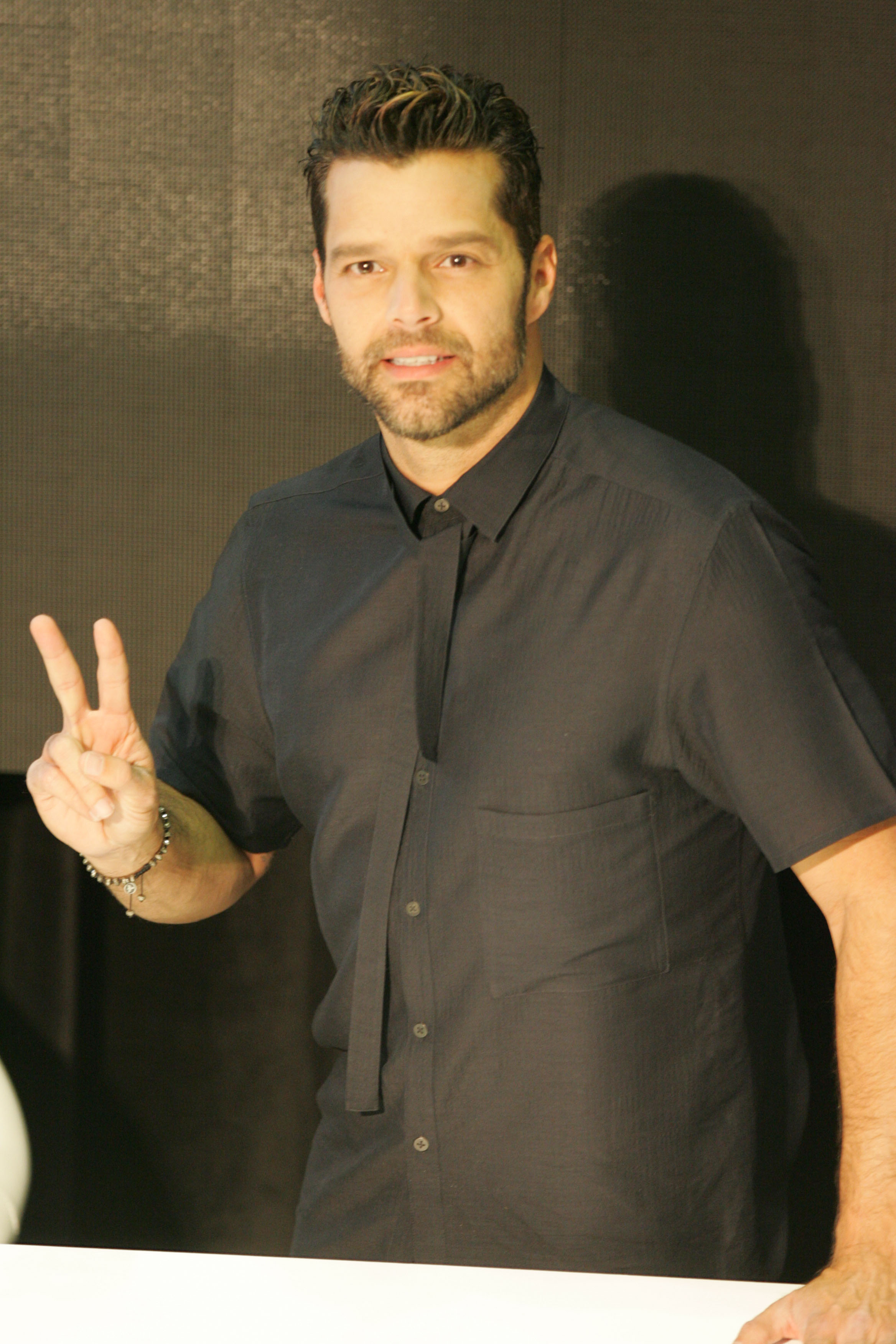
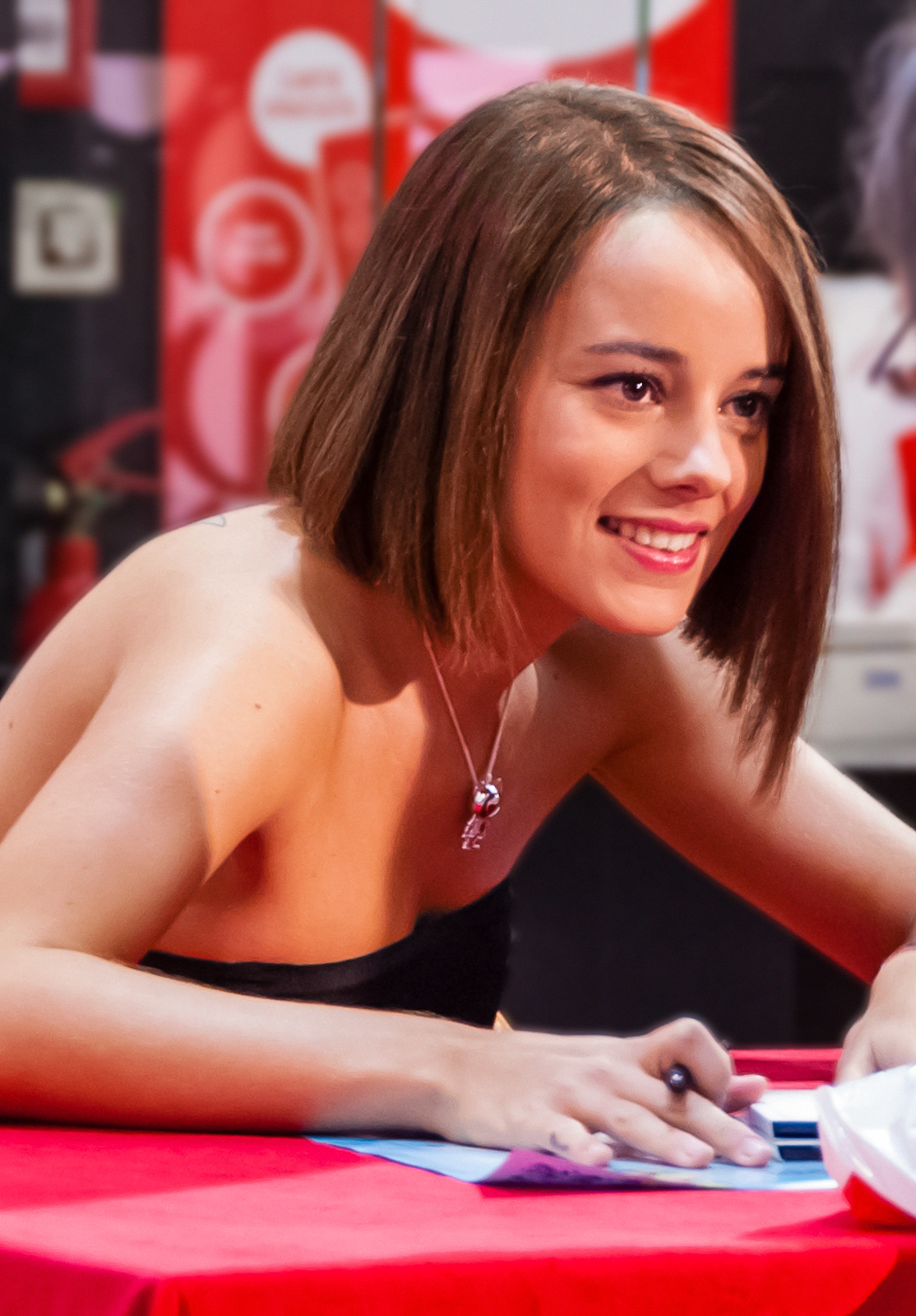
Ricky Martin (left, pictured in 2014) and Alizée (right, pictured in 2007) are among the artists who have performed cover versions of "La Isla Bonita".

Around 1986–1987, Madonna signed a $3 million endorsement deal with Mitsubishi Motors, which included a television commercial featuring her dancing to "La Isla Bonita". Even before the single's official release, the song had begun to inspire covers: in December 1986, Italian singer Micaela released a cover that reached number 25 in the Netherlands. Music & Media praised its commercial appeal despite noting the lack of Madonna's vocal sophistication. In July 1987, Mexican singer Byanka released a Spanish-language rendition that peaked at number 45 on Billboard's Hot Latin Songs chart. In 1988, a 11-year-old Shakira covered the track on Colombian television. In 1999, Chilean artist Deetah sampled the melody for "El Paraiso Rico", from her album Deadly Cha Cha. That same year, salsa singer Corrine included a bilingual version on her second album Un Poco Más, produced by Wyclef Jean.

Over the following decades, "La Isla Bonita" continued to be covered, sampled, and referenced. Rapper Black Rob's 2000 track "Spanish Fly" featured Jennifer Lopez singing a chorus based on the song. In 2004, rapper Mase sampled the hook for "My Harlem Lullaby", while actor David Hasselhoff recorded a cover for his album Sings America, which the BBC described as "decidedly karaoke". At her June 2007 concert at Milan's San Siro, Italian singer Laura Pausini performed a multilingual medley that included "La Isla Bonita", later included on the live album San Siro 2007. In 2025, Pausini performed the song at the TV show "A Grammy Celebration of Latin Music" and the following year included it on her cover album Io canto 2. French pop singer Alizée released a cover in 2008 through her official MySpace, later included on the Mexican tour edition of her third studio album, Psychédélices (2007). Though commercially successful in Mexico, La Jornada described Alizée's version as being inferior to the original.

In 2010, blogger Perez Hilton released a parody titled "Gagalupe", satirizing Madonna's spiritual beliefs. A year later, a leaked Britney Spears demo titled "Love 2 Love U" was found to heavily sample "La Isla Bonita", featuring what Los 40 described as a "Jamaican-dance rhythm" and identical melodic structure. In 2012, the track was featured in the Glee episode "The Spanish Teacher", performed by Ricky Martin and Naya Rivera; the cover charted in both the US and Canada. American band Deerhoof titled their 2014 twelfth studio album La Isla Bonita as a tribute to both Madonna and Janet Jackson, calling it their "rawest, punkiest" release since their 1997 debut. The Black Eyed Peas and Ozuna sampled "La Isla Bonita" in 2020's "Mamacita", an idea which producer Johnny Goldstein credited to will.i.am. In 2025, the track experienced renewed popularity on TikTok, where it was widely used in fashion and vacation clips; over 200,000 videos featuring the song were posted on the platform.

== Impact ==
Critics have noted the track's influence on the development of Latin pop in mainstream music. Stewart Mason said the song anticipated the Latin-influenced dance-pop that emerged in the late 1980s, citing acts such as Lisa Lisa and Cult Jam, and songs like the Pet Shop Boys' "Domino Dancing" (1988) and Madonna's own "Who's That Girl" as part of that trend. Chuck Arnold called it an early exploration of Latin styles "long before it became trendy", while Dan Ahwa wrote that it helped popularize Spanglish within mainstream pop. Judy Cantor-Navas of Billboard identified it as a precursor to the "Ricky Martin-led 'Latin Pop Explosion'" of the late 1990s. Viñuela wrote that "La Isla Bonita" incorporated many of the sonic elements that would later define Latin crossover hits by English-speaking artists, including flamenco guitar, castanets, and whispered Spanish phrases used to convey sensuality.

Stylistic echoes of "La Isla Bonita" have been observed in songs such as "Viva Forever" (1998) by the Spice Girls, Geri Halliwell's "Mi Chico Latino" (1999), Lady Gaga's "Alejandro" (2010), and "Despacito" (2016) by Luis Fonsi and Daddy Yankee. (Note: Attributed to multiple references) Natalie Nichols of the Los Angeles Times pointed out that "echoes" of the song appear "more than once" on Jennifer Lopez's second studio album, J.Lo (2001). In 2005, the song was included in Bruce Pollock's Rock Song Index: The 7500 Most Important Songs for the Rock & Roll Era. According to Manuel Heredia, Belize's former Minister of Tourism, "La Isla Bonita" enhanced Ambergris Caye's visibility, which continues to draw visitors seeking the place the song evokes.

== Track listing and formats ==
- US 7-inch single
1. "La Isla Bonita" – 4:03
2. "La Isla Bonita" (instrumental remix) – 4:20
- UK 7-inch single
1. "La Isla Bonita" (7-inch remix) – 4:01
2. "La Isla Bonita" (instrumental remix) – 4:20
- US and German 12-inch maxi-single
1. "La Isla Bonita" (extended remix) – 5:28
2. "La Isla Bonita" (instrumental) – 5:14
- 1992 Australian and Japanese CD Super Mix; 2019 Record Store Day exclusive green vinyl
1. "La Isla Bonita" (extended remix) – 5:28
2. "Open Your Heart" (extended version) – 10:38
3. "Gambler" – 3:58
4. "Crazy for You" – 4:12
5. "La Isla Bonita" (instrumental) – 5:21
- Digital single (2023)
1. "La Isla Bonita" – 4:05
2. "La Isla Bonita" (remix edit) – 4:06
3. "La Isla Bonita" (extended remix) – 5:33
4. "La Isla Bonita" (instrumental extended remix) – 5:23

== Credits and personnel ==
Credits are adapted from the True Blue album and 12-inch single liner notes.

- Madonna – songwriter, producer, vocals
- Bruce Gaitsch – Spanish guitar, acoustic guitar, songwriter
- Patrick Leonard – drum programming, keyboard, songwriter, producer
- Jonathan Moffett – drums
- Paulinho da Costa – percussion
- Siedah Garrett, Edie Lehmann – background vocals
- Michael Verdick – audio mixing, engineer
- Herb Ritts – photography
- Jeri McManus – design

== Charts ==
=== Weekly charts ===
1987 weekly chart performance for "La Isla Bonita"
| Chart (1987) | Peak position |
|---|---|
| Australia (Kent Music Report) | 6 |
| Austria (Ö3 Austria Top 40) | 1 |
| Belgium (Ultratop 50 Flanders) | 3 |
| Canada Top Singles (RPM) | 1 |
| Canada Retail Singles (The Record) | 1 |
| Canada Adult Contemporary (RPM) | 1 |
| Ecuador (La Opinión) | 1 |
| European Hot 100 Singles (Music & Media) | 1 |
| Finland (Suomen virallinen lista) | 3 |
| France (SNEP) | 1 |
| Iceland (RÚV) | 2 |
| Ireland (IRMA) | 2 |
| Italy (Musica e dischi) | 19 |
| Japan (Oricon Singles Chart) | 38 |
| Netherlands (Dutch Top 40) | 2 |
| Netherlands (Single Top 100) | 3 |
| New Zealand (Recorded Music NZ) | 5 |
| Norway (VG-lista) | 5 |
| Portugal (AFP) | 2 |
| Sweden (Sverigetopplistan) | 3 |
| Switzerland (Schweizer Hitparade) | 1 |
| UK Singles (Official Charts) | 1 |
| UK Dance Singles (Music Week) | 1 |
| US Billboard Hot 100 | 4 |
| US Adult Contemporary (Billboard) | 1 |
| US Dance Singles Sales (Billboard) | 1 |
| US Cash Box Top 100 | 4 |
| US CHR & Pop Charts (Radio & Records) | 3 |
| West Germany (GfK) | 1 |

2024 weekly chart performance for "La Isla Bonita"
| Chart (2024) | Peak position |
|---|---|
| Poland (Polish Airplay Top 100) | 51 |

2026 weekly chart performance for "La Isla Bonita"
| Chart (2026) | Peak position |
|---|---|
| Greece International (IFPI) | 53 |
| Ukraine Airplay (TopHit) | 93 |

=== Year-end charts ===
1987 year-end chart performance for "La Isla Bonita"
| Chart (1987) | Position |
|---|---|
| Australia (Kent Music Report) | 58 |
| Austria (Ö3 Austria Top 40) | 6 |
| Belgium (Ultratop 50 Flanders) | 13 |
| Canada Top Singles (RPM) | 22 |
| Denmark (Tracklisten) | 6 |
| European Hot 100 Singles (Music & Media) | 1 |
| France (SNEP) | 2 |
| Netherlands (Dutch Top 40) | 12 |
| Netherlands (Single Top 100) | 13 |
| Norway (VG-lista) | 8 |
| Switzerland (Schweizer Hitparade) | 2 |
| UK Singles (OCC) | 17 |
| US Billboard Hot 100 | 58 |
| US Adult Contemporary (Billboard) | 34 |
| US Crossover Singles (Billboard) | 15 |
| US Cash Box Top 100 | 46 |
| West Germany (GfK) | 2 |

== Certifications and sales ==
Certifications and sales for "La Isla Bonita"
| Region | Certification | Certified units/sales |
|---|---|---|
| Denmark (IFPI Danmark) | Gold | 45,000^{‡} |
| France (SNEP) | Gold | 620,000 |
| Germany (BVMI) | Gold | 250,000^{^} |
| Italy (FIMI) since 2009 | Gold | 35,000^{‡} |
| Japan (RIAJ) | Gold | 50,000^{^} |
| New Zealand (RMNZ) | Gold | 15,000^{‡} |
| Spain (Promusicae) | Platinum | 60,000^{‡} |
| United Kingdom (BPI) | Platinum | 600,000^{‡} |
| United States 12-inch format (By July 1987) | — | 75,000 |
Streaming
| Greece (IFPI Greece) | Platinum | 2,000,000^{†} |
^{^} Shipments figures based on certification alone.^{‡} Sales+streaming figures based on certification alone.
