= El Gran Carnaval de San Pedro =

Festival in Belize

The El Gran Carnaval de San Pedro is a 150-year-old traditional festival from Mestizo culture, which handed it down to northern Belize, San Pedro and Ambergris Caye. El Gran Carnaval is celebrated to begin the Lent season.

== Festivities ==
It takes place over three days, with painting, music and comparsas (street dancers). The first day opens with painting with white powder (normally reserved for children only). The second day follows with red and blue, normally using detergent and red lipstick. On the third and final day, black paint is used, which was originally charcoal. It concludes with the burning of the character Juan Carnaval.

Over the last sixty years, this tradition has kept most of its roots but diverged with using paint and eggs instead of the traditional household materials.

The Gran Carnaval is a celebration similar to Mardi Gras, and is celebrated a week before Ash Wednesday. It is meant for people to indulge in bodily pleasures that they will avoid during Lent. Men dress as women, and perform dances for money in the street, with a competition to see who performs the most outlandish dance. On the last day of the carnival people flood the streets to paint one another.

== History ==
Carnaval dates back to the 1870s when villagers. People from the districts moved to Ambergris Caye and added paint and eggs to powder, lipstick and charcoal. Carnaval is centered around a Mestizo character named "Juan Carnaval". Legend has it that Juan Carnaval had sex with over a thousand women from eight countries, with whom he had countless children. He was stabbed to death by his jealous wife and he left a will which is read on Ash Wednesday. A stuffed effigy of Juan Carnaval is burned every year for the cleansing of the community's sins.

== Rules ==
The rules for Ambergris Caye's Carnival are: the first day is restricted for children to go out and paint between PMpm to 7 pm from Ruby's Beachfront to the cemetery area and Barrier Reef Drive. Painters who are not participating are not allowed to paint individuals, public signs, buildings or comparsa participants, and are not allowed to use rotten eggs, spray paint or oil paints.
