= Manuel Heredia (politician) =

Belizean politician

Member of the Belize House of Representatives for Belize Rural South
- In office 5 March 2003 – 12 November 2020
- Preceded by: Patty Arceo
- Succeeded by: Andre Perez

Personal details
- Born: 1954 (age 71–72)
- Party: United Democratic Party

Jose Manuel Heredia Jr. (born 1954) is a Belizean politician. He is the Minister of Tourism and from 2008 to 2012 held the Civil Aviation portfolio in Belize. After the 2012 General Election, and the reshuffle of cabinet, he was given the Culture portfolio which made him the Minister of Tourism and Culture until 2020 when he was defeated in his seat by Andre Perez of the People's United Party (PUP).
