= List of Adrian Mole characters =

The Secret Diary of Adrian Mole is a British series of books written by Sue Townsend which focus on the life of Adrian Mole, one of life's losers, and his exploits and opinions of both the world's and social situations in the county of Leicestershire. The series begins when Mole is a thirteen-year-old delinquent and ends when he finds out he will be a grandfather at the age of forty-two. A sequel was produced in 2011 to highlight the Royal Wedding of Prince William and Catherine Middleton, and Townsend had been working on another Adrian Mole book at the time of her death in April 2014.

Before the Adrian Mole books, there was a radio series entitled The Secret Diary of Nigel Mole, aged 13 3/4, but the name was deemed too close to that of Nigel Molesworth.

== Main characters ==
=== Mole family ===
==== George Mole ====
George was born in 1940 to parents Albert (or Arnold/Arthur) and Edna May Mole. He was the elder brother to Susan Mole, his lesbian sister, who married a woman called Amanda and works in Holloway Prison.

He fell in love with his future wife, Pauline Sugden, and they married, having a son, Adrian. Pauline rejected Adrian for a year, leaving George to look after him, something Adrian never knew until he was middle-aged. George took a job selling electrical storage heaters, but he is later made redundant; he later finds re-employment maintaining the banks of the local canal. George, Pauline and Adrian lived together at their house on Wisteria Walk, Ashby-de-la-Zouch, Leicestershire.

However, he and Pauline had several marital problems, and they both left each other for different people on various occasions. Pauline left George for insurance salesman Alan Lucas in the early 1980s, but later returned (pregnant with Rosie), telling George that the baby was his. Soon after, George left Pauline for his former colleague Doreen Slater, fathering a son, Brett, with her. This hurt Pauline because Brett was a name that she had wanted to call her child, believing all Bretts were successful in life. Eventually, after months of suspicion, George confessed his affair and secret son to Pauline and Adrian on their family holiday to Skegness; Pauline ordered him to return to Doreen, and then got Tania Braithwaite to collect them. George, Doreen and Doreen's son, Maxwell, moved in with George's mother. When Maxwell's father, and Doreen's previous boyfriend, Trevor Roper returns from the army, Doreen swiftly abandons George for Trevor, leading to George reconciling with Pauline. Happiness did not last, and eventually the Moles got divorced in 1990. Pauline got wed to toyboy lover Martin Muffett, twenty-three years her junior, and George started living with his lover Belinda Bellingham, owner of a company selling home security systems. These relationships both end sourly - Martin leaves Pauline for Adrian's girlfriend Bianca, and Belinda throws George out when she discovers that he has been selling her product in back-street boozers for half their retail value.

George and Pauline remarry in 1993 and take on primary responsibility for Adrian's son William, as Adrian is spending most of the week in Soho, working at Savage's Restaurant as head chef. This life continues for a while until the general election, when Adrian's childhood sweetheart Pandora Braithwaite became Ashby-de-la-Zouch's Labour MP in a landslide vote. Pauline, in an initially drunken mistake, had sex with Pandora's father Ivan in Ivan and his wife Tania's gazebo. This developed into an affair, until Pauline and Ivan left their spouses for each other. Tania offered George a shoulder to cry on at the Braithwaite homestead, The Lawns, and they began a relationship, successfully bemusing and confusing Adrian, Pandora, Rosie and William. The couples married, but Pauline and Ivan's happiness was cut short when Ivan drowned on his honeymoon. George and Tania continued living at The Lawns, with George helping Tania transform her house when she was undergoing a Japanese phase, but George falls from a ladder trying to construct a pagoda, breaking his spine and suffering deep cuts from all the credit cards in his pocket. While staying in hospital, George's spine was mended, but he contracted a superbug from some shoddily cleaned equipment, causing him to be isolated and stay in hospital for upwards of eighteen months. Upon his recovery, Pauline managed to tempt George away from Tania, remarrying for a third and final time. This caused Tania to have a slight breakdown, combined with the loss of Ivan. George and Pauline move from Wisteria Walk to the (fictional) community of Mangold Parva, converting two disused pigsties into housing for themselves and Adrian's new family - Adrian, his wife Daisy and daughter Gracie. George quietens down in his later life, although he breaks his back again and has numerous strokes. He does agree to go on The Jeremy Kyle Show with Pauline, Rosie and Pauline's former lover Alan Lucas, to settle the long-running dispute over Rosie's paternity. When it is proven that Rosie is Lucas's child, George becomes withdrawn, hurt by Rosie's swift rejection of him and making him question if Adrian was his child. He makes amends with Pauline and settles into old age, especially pleased when he discovers that he will become a great-grandfather.

George, like Pauline, is sometimes tactless and inefficient. He has no qualms about showing favouritism for his three children - his favourite was always Rosie, which is why he took it so hard when he discovers Rosie is not his. He does not enjoy talking about his feelings and wants his son to be a "real man", like a computer technician. One of his less attractive qualities is his openly saying that he married Adrian's mother Pauline because of "how good her legs looked in a miniskirt".

==== Brett Slater/Mole ====
Brett Slater, later Brett Mole, is the result of an affair between George Mole and Doreen Slater in the early 1980s, meaning he is Adrian's half-brother. Brett, a name his father stole from his then-wife Pauline, has an elder half-brother, Maxwell. The Slater family and George lived for a short time with George's mother Edna and eventually Brett moved with his mother and brother to Bournemouth. Brett re-enters Adrian's life in 2001, as an Oxford undergraduate who has been commissioned by Channel 4 to shoot a documentary on a council estate, and chose Adrian's site. Brett is everything Adrian ever wanted to be; rich, successful and popular with women. During the short time he stayed with his brother, he became a role model for Adrian's sons Glenn and William and left cables, cameras and crew all over Adrian's house. When the documentary flopped, Brett and his team disappeared within three hours. Brett re-appeared again in The Prostrate Years as a successful businessman who lost his empire and three riverside apartments in London, Tokyo and New York City to the credit crunch. He informs the Mole family that Doreen Slater died in a motorbike accident which, to Adrian, seemed to be a fabricated version of what really happened - there were a few facts that did not add up. Upon his arrival, Brett proceeded to steal the eyes of Adrian's daughter Gracie, wife Daisy and both Adrian's parents. Brett bought ten packs of white cotton shirts and threw each one away after only a day's wear. Adrian clears up after him, stops his brother's alcoholism and generally sorts him out; Brett lives on with Adrian after getting his life back on track before leaving once again.

=== Extended family ===
- Edna May Mole, commonly known as Grandma (22 March 1905 – 1 March 1992), is the paternal grandmother of Adrian and mother of George and Susan. Provider of Sunday dinners, constant electricity and unwanted religion, Edna is a strict, no-nonsense widow, and has lived alone since the death of her husband. She does not believe in home security systems; if she goes out, she turns up Radio 4 and leaves the door unlocked, also claiming that if she fitted one people would think she had something worth stealing. Edna dotes on her grandchild and will often give him money for a Mars Bar, usually for Adrian helping and tidying his room. Edna is well renowned in the family for her wonderful Sunday dinners, and it is remarked that she used the same Yorkshire pudding tin for forty years. She, and her husband, are strongly opposed to their daughter's lesbianism. Edna has a love/hate relationship with her daughter-in-law Pauline - and, subsequently, her relatives the Sugdens - as Edna disapproves of her wanton behaviour, yet when Pauline and George divorce she still visits her regularly. Edna keeps money in three separate vases: one for gas, electricity and heating. Edna dies during The Wilderness Years. Following her death, Pauline shows a momentous outpouring of grief, to the family's surprise. Edna and Albert have three great-grandchildren - Glenn, William and Gracie - and a great-great-grandchild (unborn as of 2008).
- Albert Mole, commonly known as Grandad Mole (died 1977), is Adrian's deceased paternal grandfather and the father of George and Susan. Adrian mentions that when he was six, a dog bit his arm and his grandmother put iodine on the wound while Albert kicked the dog around the kitchen. Albert was a veteran of both World War I and II; alongside mentions of his serving in the Battle of Ypres, his son George once said "just the sound of Lilli Marlene and he would be crying. Your Grandma would send him out the room to pull himself together". He is once described as cold and would tire quickly of his grandson's frequent questions, much to his bewilderment. He, and his wife, are strongly opposed to their daughter's lesbianism. Adrian remembers the family wanting to pay their last respects to Albert in his coffin, but nobody could find the screwdriver to lift the lid off with. He used to work at the factory on Rat Wharf - Adrian later moves into a block of flats standing where the factory used to be. There has always been some confusion over his name; in The Secret Diary of Adrian Mole, Aged 13¾ and The Wilderness Years, his name is given as Albert; in Growing Pains, his name is given as Arnold, and in Weapons of Mass Destruction, his name is given as Arthur. Albert and Edna have three great-grandchildren - Glenn, William and Gracie - and a great-great-grandchild (unborn as of 2008).
- Susan Mole, better known as Auntie Susan, is the daughter of Albert and Edna, sister of George and aunt of Adrian. She works as a prison guard at Holloway, and always gets Adrian's birthday wrong. Susan, a lesbian, is first seen dating Gloria, but a reference is later made of her marriage to a woman named Amanda. Susan gave advice to Nigel Hetherington when he was planning to tell his parents that he was gay; she said "I just came out with it. 'Mum, I'm gay. Like it or lump it.' Minus the screaming and shouting, it was over in two minutes", to Nigel's response of "Oh, how brave!". Susan always sends Adrian birthday cards which he describes as "vulgar!" and "in extremely bad taste"; one example is a Christmas card she sends him with "the carrot in the wrong place". Susan has two great-nephews, Glenn and William, and a great-niece, Gracie. She smokes Panama cigarettes.
- Grandma and Grandad Sugden are Adrian's maternal grandparents and Pauline's boring parents. They are religious Norfolk potato farmers who fail to enjoy life unless something is being harvested or slaughtered, and Adrian claims they are "all inbred and can't talk properly!". They have never fully understood why Pauline left home, but they see it as their duty to visit her every Christmas and frown upon their daughter’s sluttish lifestyle. They disapprove of her constant divorces. As of The Cappuccino Years, they are still alive. Grandad Sugden has a condition that sends him to sleep every twenty minutes, "but only for ten seconds or so" as Grandma Sugden says. They gave their grandson a Bible Stories for Boys for Christmas 1981. They are strict teetotallers who think "the only decent part of Christmas" is the Queen's speech, according to Adrian. They make their last appearance in The Lost Diaries, when they pay Pauline and Ivan a visit over Christmas - and Grandad Sugden falls into Tania's koi carp pond. Both Grandma Mole and Aunt Susan dislike them intensely. In Pauline's autobiography, A Girl called Shit (a parody of A Child Called 'It'), she describes her father as "a brutal giant of a man, with a head of black hair and a matted beard." She also claims that he was five minutes late to take exams at Cambridge University, but was turned away and upon his return burned every book - In real life Grandad Sugden has never been known to raise his voice. She describes her mother as Lady Clarissa Cavendish-Stronge, a local aristocrat who met her husband when she fell off her horse. Adrian knows this is a lie; a family rumour is that Grandma Sugden once attended a gymkhana and was asked to leave when her face upset the horses.
- Uncle Dennis, Auntie Marcia and Cousin Maurice are more of Pauline's Norfolk relatives. They are described as having faces that look like they visit funerals every day of their lives, so much to the point that Adrian and George cannot believe that his mother is related to them. In a letter to Pauline during her separation from George, the Sugdens wrote to inform her that Dennis, Marcia and Maurice have moved out of their caravan and into a council house, and that cousin Maurice lost a grey sock at the Mole household during his stay at Christmas, much to Auntie Marcia's dismay. Pauline replied that she would gladly come up and inspect their house and sent them a £1 note to buy Maurice a new pair of socks. Their relationship to Pauline is unclear; Pauline refers to them as "Auntie" and "Uncle", but it is commonly thought that Dennis is Pauline's brother. After their stay at Christmas, this particular branch of the Sugden clan is not referenced to again.
- Pete Sugden is Pauline's brother. Adrian overhears a telephone conversation between the two in The Lost Diaries, where it is revealed that Pete's wife Yvonne stole a brooch that was left to Pauline in a will, and that their mother never particularly liked Yvonne. However, after slagging Yvonne off, Pete reveals that she had died the day previously. Pauline then asks for her brother to send her the brooch through the post and Pete hung up. Pete and Yvonne Sugden had never been mentioned previously, and were never mentioned again.
- Finley-Rose is Glenn's fiancée and mother of his child (unborn as of 2008). She is very clever; she corrects Glenn on his frequent grammatical errors and gets on well with Adrian. She and Glenn meet in a nightclub, and communicate through the bouncer, Tiny Curtis. During Glenn's next spell of leave they spend Christmas 2007 with her grandparents in Scotland, where Glenn proposes. She is a pretty girl, and Adrian is glad that Glenn has managed to find someone so pretty for him.
- Amanda is Susan Mole's wife and Adrian's aunt by marriage. It is stated that she and Susan married shortly before the beginning of Cappuccino Years and that Adrian attended their wedding reception in the officers' social club at Holloway Prison.
- Martin Muffet is Pauline Mole's second husband, 23 years her junior. He was Adrian's stepfather until his decision to leave Pauline for Adrian's own girlfriend, Bianca Dartington.

=== Adrian's wives ===
==== Jojo ====
Jojo Mapfumo (previously Mole) is Adrian's first wife and mother of William, his younger son. The couple met when Adrian, still chopping vegetables for Peter Savage, met Jojo on her first day as a waitress, the same job given up by Adrian's ex-girlfriend Bianca. Jojo and Adrian's marriage was short, although long enough to conceive and produce a child, but Jojo's memories are not exactly happy ones. She claims that Adrian's conversation was far from stimulating, and one conversation that agitated her was when Adrian accused her of exaggerating her sneezes. Jojo complains that exaggerating her sneezes is the last thing she would do, being a six-foot, pregnant black woman in extravagant dress. Jojo later divorces Adrian and leaves for her native homeland of Nigeria, with Adrian taking custody of their child. Jojo later marries a Nigerian man who is very successful in business (initially named as Colonel Ephat Mapfumo and later as Wole; it is possible Jojo in fact remarried twice.) Jojo looks up her ex-husband on the internet and faxes him, complete with the information she found on the internet, much to Adrian's agony. William visits his mother and stepfather in London while they are on their honeymoon. Jojo asks if she can take William back to Nigeria, as William is her eldest child and therefore held in high esteem by her family. Adrian tells her that she cannot, so Jojo goes back to Nigeria without her son. Between the events of The Lost Diaries and Weapons of Mass Destruction, Jojo takes William back to Nigeria, much to the heartache of Adrian, Glenn, Pauline and George. William telephones his father, and asks if he can change his name to Wole, like his stepfather's, to which Adrian reluctantly agrees. Jojo's family background is mixed; her father is a Nigerian chief, her mother the owner of a lorry driving firm, and at the last count there were 204 members of her immediate family.

==== Daisy Mole ====
Daisy Mole (née Flowers) is Adrian's second wife and mother of his daughter, Gracie. Daisy is the first daughter of Michael Flowers and only child of his first wife, a Spanish woman named Conchita. Conchita ran away from Michael and infant Daisy when she found love with a butcher named Arthur and besides, Michael was suffocating her with undying love and presents. Daisy is the half-sister of Poppy and Marigold Flowers. Adrian is briefly engaged to Marigold, and only hears things about Daisy, but finally meets her when the Flowers family and the Mole family get together to discuss their offspring's upcoming marriage. Daisy is introduced as a devil-may-care type with Prada handbags and looks to spare. She and Adrian click instantly, and Adrian develops feelings for her that he must conceal. He eventually confides in his parents, George and Pauline, and they agree that Daisy is indeed a beauty. Adrian eventually breaks off the engagement, to the anger of Michael and Marigold's mother Netta, and gets engaged to Daisy; the two later marry. They move into the converted pigsty next to George and Pauline, and produce a daughter named Gracie, who enjoys dressing up as various Disney princesses. Daisy, originally thin, was becoming plumper and plumper until she starts eating whole packets of chocolate Digestives a day. Daisy and Adrian's marriage becomes boring, and Daisy finds comfort with Mangold Parva's local aristocrat, Hugo Fairfax-Lycett, and Daisy moves into the Fairfax-Lycett mansion, just down the road from her and Adrian's house. Pauline laments the loss of Daisy, saying that Daisy was the daughter she deserved. Adrian and Daisy later divorce, with Daisy and Hugo gaining main custody of Gracie. Despite their divorce, the two get on well afterwards. Daisy has never met William, but maintains a friendly relationship with Glenn.

=== Adrian's children ===
==== Glenn Bott-Mole ====
Glenn Bott-Mole is the child of Adrian and Sharon Bott, half-brother to William and Gracie and nephew of Rosie Mole and Marjorie Bott. Rosie describes Glenn to Adrian as 'a psycho, but he has your nose'. Initially, Adrian is unsure of Glenn's parentage; at the time he was conceived, Sharon was seeing Barry Kent as well as Adrian. Regardless of this, Sharon's mother insists that Adrian sends Sharon some money every week to help her get by. However, blood tests prove that Adrian is indeed Glenn's father. Glenn and Adrian meet for the first time on Father's Day 1998, causing a tense atmosphere over the Mole household. Glenn's paternal grandmother, Pauline Mole (then Braithwaite) says that she can like the child, but love could take some working on. Glenn eventually leaves Sharon and moves in with his father and half-brother William. Inside a Mother's Day card for Sharon, Glenn's card reads: "You are mad and always sad, That is why I live with Dad". In his early teens, Glenn becomes obsessed with David Beckham and his family, so much to the point where he gets a Beckham haircut and adopts his accent. He does, however, take pity on his father and at one point takes charge when Adrian is on a low. Glenn later joins the army, and is stationed at Aldershot Barracks. Adrian pays for himself and Glenn to go on holiday to Cyprus, a place where Glenn is later posted. After this, he fights abroad in Afghanistan, much to the horror of Adrian and his parents. When he is on leave, he meets a girl, Finley-Rose. The couple spend Christmas with Finley's grandparents and become engaged. Glenn and Finley-Rose fall deeply in love and she becomes pregnant with Glenn's child, much to the joy of Adrian and his family.

==== William Mole ====
William Mole (later Wole Mole) is Adrian's second son through his marriage to Jojo. William is a hyperactive as a child, and becomes the pride and joy of his grandparents, George and Pauline. As a child, he worries Adrian by becoming obsessed with Barbie dolls, asking for a Barbie-themed Easter egg and a Barbie hair-dressing salon for Christmas. Jojo never sees her son, and William never asks about her, yet he surprises Adrian by crying for his mother at the Safeway's crèche. Adrian uses him as an excuse to see Mary-Lou Hattersley, the proprietor of said crèche, with whom Adrian has a slight infatuation. He bribes William with McDonald's, but soon he puts his little foot down and refuses to be taken any longer. William goes to see his mother and her new husband, Wole, on their honeymoon in London. Jojo later claims William and takes him back to Nigeria upon the end of their civil war. William occasionally calls his father, and asks his consent to change his name to Wole like his stepfather. Adrian reluctantly agrees. Adrian deeply misses William, and does not talk about him as the subject is too painful. When Daisy says to Adrian "guess who's next door?!" in The Prostrate Years (meaning Adrian's half-brother Brett), Adrian's first thoughts go to William.

==== Gracie Mole ====
Grace Pauline "Gracie" Mole is the daughter of Adrian and Daisy Mole, and Adrian's third child and only daughter. Gracie is, by nature, an obnoxious child who refuses to wear her school uniform and goes in the costumes of various Disney princesses. In the end, her headmistress Mrs. Bull calls in Adrian and tells him to put his foot down, as Gracie's behaviour is attracting too much attention and refers the child to a child psychologist, despite Adrian's assertions that this could be the signs of a gifted child - something Mrs. Bull flatly denied. Gracie usually fights back to any sort of superiority or control over her, but her grandmother Pauline has a special force, to the point that when she is finished with her Gracie is polite, courteous, quiet and wearing school uniform. When Daisy and Adrian separate, the couple share custody of her. Gracie enjoys this, as Daisy's new boyfriend, Hugo Fairfax-Lycett, gives her a pony - something that Gracie has always wanted. Gracie adores her eldest brother, Glenn. She does not like her maternal grandfather, Michael Flowers, as "he looks like a lady with a beard"; a reference to Michael's ponytail.

== Adrian's girlfriends ==
- Bianca Dartington is Adrian's first girlfriend since moving to Oxford. She is an engineer like Adrian's stepfather, Martin Muffet, and wants to go and see Battersea Power Station. Bianca works as a waitress at Savage's and introduces Adrian to his first job there. Bianca previously worked in the local newsagents when he lived with Pandora and the Palmer family. Adrian and Bianca enjoy a very physical relationship, to the point where Bianca starts becoming delicate around her genitals. Bianca had a very boring, Christian upbringing; her father, the Reverend Dartington, is a strict man, and her mother was 48 when she gave birth. Bianca has two elder siblings: Derek and Mary. Adrian is surprised that his girlfriend can come from such a boring, plain family, as Bianca has a strong personality and good looks. Adrian and Bianca spend Christmas at the Dartington household - it was a disaster. The couple were the only two to bring presents, as the others donated money to Sudan. When Bianca moans that they did not tell her, Adrian claims that it was to show that they had the moral high ground. To make matters worse, Adrian's presents were disasters. Mrs. Dartington was allergic to the peach-related present he gave her, and Reverend Dartington responded frostily to the poetry and trainspotting books Adrian bought him. However, after one stay with Adrian's family, Bianca starts an affair with Pauline's much younger husband, Martin Muffet, a fellow engineer. Grandma Mole spots the two sitting together on top of a bus, and at St Pancras railway station, one of Bianca's favourite places as it is "the world's largest unsupported structure", Adrian goes to greet Bianca to be greeted with Martin Muffet's arm around her shoulders, giving Adrian and Pauline a shared heartbreak. Bianca takes her belongings from the flat and leaves with Muffet. One point of anxiety for her is that when people hire her for a job, they are thrown by the fact that she is a girl, and she was seriously considering putting "Brian Dartington" on her CV.
- Pamela Pigg is Adrian's first housing officer and later girlfriend. Adrian puts "gay" on his housing application form, and Pamela is surprised by Adrian's stereotypical view on gay people, and gives an example of the previous week when she evicted a gay couple who lived in a shambles and owned a dog that terrorised the neighbours. Pamela's father teaches kayaking, and prefers to be known as "Porky", and her mother "Perky". Adrian and Pamela have nicknames for each other: "Snuffly" for Adrian and "Piglet" for Pamela. Pamela is sometimes ashamed of her parents' behaviour, and develops a tic in her left eye when her father and boyfriend do not get on. Her name is a source of embarrassment for her, and one particular sad memory is of her first day as a substitute teacher. Pamela and Adrian have a stressful relationship - the two argue, split up and reconcile frequently. The first split occurs when Pamela reads the first few chapters of Sty, Adrian's new manuscript, which involves a pig called Pamela. The two reconcile when Pamela goes on a hen night with her lesbian friends Philippa and Mary, and the couple's song starts playing on the disco floor. They again split up when she sees Kingsley Amis's Letters on the kitchen table. They again reconcile when Pamela tells Adrian that she has two Pokémon Easter eggs for William and Glenn, just the type that Adrian was looking for. When the two do eventually consummate their relationship, there is an earthquake that knocks the tiles off the roof - "the first time anyone has made the world move for me", so Pamela says - and secondly, William walks in on the two in bed, and says that the two would have to get married (William had never seen his own parents in bed, let alone with other people). Pamela eventually leaves Adrian for a country singer named Alan Clarke, but remains Adrian's housing officer. She and Adrian reconcile for one last time before going the separate ways, just days before Adrian's house is raided and he is arrested.

== Braithwaite family ==
=== Ivan Braithwaite ===
Ivan Braithwaite is the father of Pandora, first husband of Tania and fourth husband of Pauline. Ivan is a strict Labour supporter of Polish descent, and is a member of the local Labour party - that is, until he trusted Adrian to visit his house every day and feed their cat while the family were on holiday. Adrian saw Ivan's letter of resignation on the desk, and posted it. Ivan works as an accountant at the local dairy. Ivan eventually starts an affair with Pauline Mole, while his wife Tania starts one with Pauline's husband George. Pauline and Ivan eventually marry, as do George and Tania. However, their marriage does not last long; on his and Pauline's honeymoon, Ivan swims back to an island thirty meters away to fetch Pauline's sunglasses which she discovered in her bag. When Ivan tried to return, he was caught in difficulty and drowned, leaving Pauline, Tania and Pandora distraught. George, unable to cope with seeing Pauline so upset, leaves Tania, divorces her and eventually remarries Pauline for the third time.

=== Tania Braithwaite ===
Tania Braithwaite (previously Mole) is Pandora's mother, and the wife of firstly Ivan and secondly George. Tania is first introduced as a stylish, sophisticated woman with a great dress sense; however, in The Cappuccino Years, it is revealed that since the previous book Tania had suffered a minor stroke and lost the epic dress sense she possessed. Tania is left distraught after finding out Ivan had an affair with her daughter's ex-boyfriend's mother Pauline, but soon finds comfort from her husband George. The two couples eventually divorce and marry the other's spouse. Tania begins educating George, the second time he has had such an experience since splitting with his ex-mistress Belinda Bellingham, and the two live in the Braithwaite house, an elegant design made in the late 1970s and named 'The Lawns'. However, Tania is horrified to learn of Ivan's untimely death and is saddened further when her husband George leaves her to comfort his ex-wife. The couple soon divorce and Tania goes back to using the Braithwaite name.

== Flowers family ==
=== Michael Flowers ===
Michael Flowers is the husband of Netta, father of Daisy, Poppy and Marigold and grandfather of Gracie. Michael owns a shop on Leicester High Street, County Organics, selling flower seeds. He votes conservative. He wears his hair in a ponytail, to the point where his granddaughter describes him as "a lady with a beard". Michael is a devout believer of all things organic, and does everything he can to prevent using fossil fuels. He invents a product, Orgobeet Juice, but it is rejected by Dragon's Den, much to his disgust. Michael has three daughters: Daisy, Poppy and Marigold. Daisy is the product of his first marriage to the Mexican Conchita, who left him; Poppy and Marigold are the products of his second marriage to Netta. He is an enthusiastic countertenor of the local madrigal society. He hates people from and all things to do with Mexico. Michael has a sister and a nephew.

=== Netta Flowers ===
Netta Flowers is the ex-wife of Michael Flowers. She, like her husband, does not want to waste fossil fuels, and makes foul-tasting foods as a result. She helps her husband at his shop in Leicester High Street. Netta starts having an affair with a man named Roger Middleton, and it is debated whether she and Michael should divorce so Netta can marry Roger or have an open marriage; the eventual outcome is divorce. Michael and Netta had two daughters together, Poppy and Marigold. Adrian describes her as having unnaturally red cheeks.

=== Marigold Flowers ===
Marigold Flowers is the youngest daughter of Michael and Netta and the youngest sister of Daisy and Poppy. A thirty-something on-the-shelf depressive who works at Country Organics and accidentally becomes Adrian's girlfriend and later fiancée. Her hobby is building miniature dollhouses; she performs as Mary in a peripatetic Nativity with the Leicester Mummers, and is even less fun than this sounds. Fatally for Adrian, she has beautifully soft skin and fragile wrists. Her parents conclude that she and Adrian can have sexual intercourse every Tuesday and Thursday on Marigold's fairytale carriage bed which, according to Adrian, is "mind-boggling". When Marigold and Adrian split up, Adrian's schoolfriend Bruce “Brainbox” Henderson quickly takes his place. A scare runs through the Flowers and Mole families when Marigold announces she is pregnant, much to Adrian's horror. He agrees to pay Marigold a certain amount of money every week. Adrian and Daisy later read in Marigold's diary that she is faking the pregnancy, and later announces that she has had a miscarriage. Adrian never confronts her about the issue. A "manipulative, hysterical hypochondriac" according to her half-sister Daisy Flowers.

=== Poppy Flowers ===
Poppy Flowers is the elder sister of Marigold and younger half-sister of Daisy. A Scientologist mathematics teacher whose distinguishing feature and main reason for living is her extraordinarily long hair. She is not enthusiastic about her parents and medievalism; she prefers the Romans for their civilising influence and "amazing hair products".

== Adrian's elderly friends ==
- Bertram "Bert" Baxter is an elderly man whom Adrian meets through his school's Good Samaritan programme. Despite Bert's disgusting physical appearance in person and house, Adrian and Bert become good friends and have a close bond. Bert is a widower with four daughters, two of whom live in Australia. He later moves into the Alderman Cooper Sunshine Rest Home for the Elderly, at the advice of his social worker Katie Bell. Bert becomes unofficially engaged to a widow named Queenie, and the two eventually get married, move into an OAP's bungalow and enjoy a happy year of marriage until Queenie dies following a stroke. Following his second wife's death, Bert moves back into Alderman Cooper and becomes unable to walk. When Adrian first begins caring for Bert, he owned an Alsatian dog, Sabre, whom Adrian despised and viewed as vicious. Bert is a fan of beetroot and Woodbine cigarettes, a staunch communist and reader of the Morning Star. Bert dies in a stairlift accident on the eve of his 106th birthday (as mentioned in the opening pages of The Cappuccino Years), after claiming he refused to die until "the downfall of capitalism". Adrian feels a large chunk of his life disappear following Bert's death. As well as having Adrian to help out, Pandora also called at Bert's to assist Adrian with Bert's general well-being.
- Maud Lilian "Queenie" Baxter is Bert's second wife. When Bert and Queenie meet, they are both widowers with children; Queenie has a son called Nathan, a daughter-in-law named Maria and two grandchildren, Jodie and Jason, living in Canada. Queenie is described as "loud", and she dyes her hair to make herself look younger. The couple's unofficial engagement causes scandal at Alderman Cooper; since the death of Thomas Bell, Bert is the only male resident at the home. Queenie dies following a stroke on 7 December 1982, at her and Bert's OAP's bungalow. Many messages appeared in the following morning's newspaper.
- Mrs. Wormington (née Broadway) is an elderly widow whom Adrian befriends when he is visiting his father in hospital after he falls off a ladder while re-vamping Tania Braithwaite's back garden into a Japanese theme. Adrian takes Mrs. Wormington in after she begs him not to let her go with her son Ted and daughter-in-law Eunice; she claims that if she did she would be dead within a month. To add to that, mother and son have not seen each other for twenty years over a row about a clock. Before moving in with Adrian, Glenn and William, Mrs. Wormington owned a three-bedroom house overlooking the canal. Mrs. Wormington adores biscuits and the Royal Family, but does not enjoy the constant arguments from Adrian's neighbours, the Ludlow family. After a holiday with the Ludlow family at Mablethorpe, the Ludlow's and Mrs. Wormington contract pneumonia. The Ludlows recover, but the illness gets its hold on Mrs. Wormington. She died in hospital aged 97. She had a brother called Cedric who travelled to the Dunkirk on a boat called the Betty Grable. After the traumatic events at Dunkirk, his personality was changed - he started knitting and joined the Communist Party, two activities which were enough to exclude him from the family's bosom. Mrs. Wormington wrote to him in secret, and sent him knitting patterns on his birthday. Mrs. Wormington was a member of many societies, including Amnesty International, the Fox and Ferret Ladies darts team and the Cacti Club of Great Britain.

== Neil Armstrong Comprehensive School ==
=== Teachers ===
==== 1980 to 1984 ====
- Mr. Reginald Scruton is the headmaster. His bulging eyes have yielded him the nickname "Pop-Eye". He is a strict and intimidating man. Politically, he is a supporter of Margaret Thatcher, which does not fall well with many of the students and staff.
- Mr. Lambert-Fossington-Gore (né Lambert) is Adrian's form tutor. He is very kind to Adrian; he takes him to a café where he gives Adrian advice on his domestic situations, however he stops this after the entire class asks him for advice. He later marries Miss Fossington-Gore.
- Mr. Jones is the PE teacher at Neil Armstrong Comprehensive. Adrian describes him as a sadist. He is sacked during Adrian's time off school due to a breakdown, after Adrian writes the headmaster a letter saying that it was Jones who used his nickname "Pop-Eye" most frequently.
- Mrs. Appleyard, the domestic science teacher, who confiscated Barry Kent's Benson & Hedges cigarettes - the teachers were later seen to have been smoking them in the staffroom.
- Mr. Southgate, the Biology teacher.
- Mrs. Claricoates is the school receptionist. In The Lost Diaries, she has progressed to teaching the reception class.
- Mr. Golightly, the Drama teacher.
- Mrs. Figges, the school organist.
- Miss Sproxton, the English teacher.
- Mr. Animba, the school's woodwork teacher.
- Ms Fossington-Gore is Adrian's art teacher. She was in charge of a trip to the British Museum that went so badly she almost resigned from teaching after told to do so by Pandora. She later sent Barry Kent home for wearing a Union Jack T-shirt, calling it a symbol of fascism. As noted above, she later marries Mr Lambert.

==== 1999 to 2001 ====
- Roger Patience is the headmaster. He introduced a new informality to Neil Armstrong Comprehensive, in the form of banishing school uniform and asking the children to call him Roger. He regrets these actions, as the school has run amok and dropped severely in the Ofsted ratings.
- Mr. Lunt is the PE teacher at Neil Armstrong Comprehensive. He refuses to allow Glenn to wear tracksuit bottoms when the class do cross-country running through the village. Lunt also takes offence at the rude remarks Adrian makes to the country-dwellers.
- Mr. Billington is the Drama teacher, who choreographed the failed Christmas play, Jesus in Las Vegas.
- Nurse McKye is the school nit-nurse.

=== Students ===
- Barry "Baz" Kent is the school's psychobilly bully at Neil Armstrong Comprehensive, and the head of a gang that terrorises Adrian, Nigel, Pandora and their fellow students. The Kent family live on Corporation Row, situated on the Margaret Thatcher estate. It is so violent that most people refuse to do the evening paper round there. Barry commits educational suicide firstly by wearing a Union Jack T-shirt to school, upon which the local newspaper gets involved, and secondly when he wears his studded leather jacket and chains to school, leading Mr. Scruton to ban studs from everywhere other than on the bottom of football boots. At the age of sixteen, Kent becomes strongly anti-racist. Barry has a natural gift for poetry, which Adrian encourages him to develop. He regrets this when Barry becomes not only a successful poet, but the author of a hit novel Dork's Diary which revolves around a loser called "Aiden Vole", a tongue-in-cheek reference to the Adrian Mole books themselves. Barry Kent succeeds on natural talent, which Adrian Mole has clearly been unable to find in himself. Adrian tries to turn his defeat into victory by creating a fictional character, the failed writer "Kent Barry", in a novel that is never published. Barry is friends with people such as Angela Hacker and Jeanette Winterson. Barry has an elder brother, Clive, who fought in the Falklands war; it is unknown if he survived or not. Towards the later books Adrian mellows in his opinion of Barry, and spurred by their shared relationships and children sends him a peace overture.
- Nigel Hetherington is Adrian's on-and-off best chum who has a somewhat bohemian lifestyle. Despite having a brief relationship with Pandora, Nigel moves to London and comes out as a gay man. Nigel goes through a phase of being a punk rocker; he pierces his ear with a safety pin and develops blood poisoning as a result. In the last novel he is forced to move into his parents' granny flat, having become blind, as Townsend herself did. Nigel turns to Buddhism, and becomes a delivery driver for Next. Nigel meets Lance Lovett, who is also blind and gay, and in the final book the two marry at a local mansion. The event is organised by Adrian's wife Daisy, despite the couple being separated at the time. Both Nigel and Lance have a great sense of colour co-ordination, and decorate their flat with matching colours and candles, much to Adrian's concern. Nigel receives a guide dog named Graham, who dies in the final book and Adrian is called upon to bury the dog - the second dog in twenty years. Nigel becomes more sceptical about Adrian and his lifestyle, much to Adrian's annoyance. Nigel has a brief stint as Pandora's personal assistant. In the original TV series and in Adrian Mole and the Small Amphibians, his name is given as Nigel Partridge.
- Sharon Bott (occasionally Botts) is Adrian's second girlfriend and the mother of his first child. She is introduced in Growing Pains as the girl who "will show everything for 50p and a pound of grapes", but Adrian has an unsuccessful date with her set up by Nigel. In True Confessions, Adrian has lost his virginity with Sharon, but it is obvious that neither of them has any interest in the other beyond sex. Sharon starts putting on weight, and she is referred to as overweight in the later books. After it is proven that Adrian fathered Glenn in Cappuccino Years, Sharon re-enters Adrian's life; they maintain a good relationship as parents of Glenn. It is revealed that she has seven siblings, including an older sister, Marjorie, and younger brother, Karak. Her parents are still alive. Mr. Bott is a quiet, polite man, unlike the rest of the Bott family. As Sharon ages, she gains more and more weight until she is described as obese. A character in Lo! The Flat Hills of My Homeland named Sharon Slagg, based on Sharon, is mentioned. While Sharon is still seeing Adrian, she starts seeing Barry Kent on the side, leading to confusion over who Glenn's father is - a blood test revealed that Adrian was indeed the father.
- Bruce "Brainbox" Henderson is one of Adrian's friends who is good with computers. He starts the school magazine. In later books, he marries Adrian's ex-fiancée (and later sister-in-law) Marigold Flowers.
- Claire Neilson is Pandora's best friend. She is a beautiful yet snobbish type, who looks down on Adrian and is part of his and Pandora's political party, the Pink Brigade. Her cat is expecting kittens as of the first book. In Weapons of Mass Destruction, she appears at the school reunion as a worried-looking type who has lost her beauty and constantly worries about whether her children are in bed.
- Barbara Boyer is another attractive girl, who becomes part of a love triangle between herself, Adrian and Pandora. After Nigel Hetherington tells the entire school about their affair, Boyer ends the saga. She appears for one appearance at the political party, but she argues with Pandora over China's significance, and Pandora asks Claire (who brought her in the first place) not to bring her again. At the school reunion, she is now a stunning woman on her fifth husband. In the final book, she holds her birthday party at Nigel's flat. Adrian stumbles upon the party when he calls in on Nigel, and for a couple of hours enjoys himself, and realises later that if he had not gone to Nigel's, he would not have known about the party.
- Danny Thompson is a boy in Adrian's class who forms a Rasta band and gains the nickname "the White Rasta". It is suggested that he really is Jamaican but has albinism.
- Elizabeth Sally Stafford (née Broadway) is a girl in Adrian's Science class. Elizabeth had a crush on Adrian and had a fight with Pandora over him in the playground. She re-appears in The Lost Diaries when she visits a newsagents Adrian is in at the time. When Adrian asks her if she lives on the estate (which he does), she replies with "Of course not! Do I look like a nutter?" It is mentioned in Weapons of Mass Destruction that she now owns an interior design company.
- Victoria Louise Thomson is a girl in Adrian's Science class. She passes Adrian a note from Elizabeth Broadway asking him if she will go out with him. She reappears in Weapons of Mass Destruction at the school reunion, where Adrian learns that she has moved up the social ladder by marrying a series of rich men.
- Mohammed Parvez (later referred to as Parvez) is a former school friend of Adrian. He played a heroin-addicted Jesus in an "experimental" Nativity play directed by Adrian. By the time of Lost Diaries Mohammed is married to Fatima, has had several children, and runs a garage. In order to deflect press accusations of racism against her, Pandora invited herself and a Newsnight crew to Mohammed's house for dinner, leaving Fatima annoyed at being expected to cook. Parvez later changes careers to become an accountant, and is hired to give Adrian financial advice - which Adrian completely ignores, contributing to his mounting debt problem. It is unclear whether Parvez is related to William's headmistress Mrs. Parvez.
- Wayne Wong is a former school friend of Adrian. As an adult he runs a Chinese restaurant (alternately named as either "Wong's" or "Imperial Dragon.") He is highly sarcastic and dislikes Marigold Flowers, who, in Wayne's words, resembles one of his pet koi carp.
- Craig Thomas is a former school friend in the first Adrian Mole book, who is one of the biggest in his year. The friendship starts with Adrian buying him a Mars bar, hoping that Craig would protect him from bully Barry Kent. However, the friendship ends abruptly when Adrian finds out he is dating with Pandora.

== Adrian's landlords ==
- Mrs. Hedge is the first of Adrian's landlords and landladies. She is described as sluttish, and had a four-pack of Guinness in the fridge which is gone in two days. She keeps a very loose house, but is very beautiful; the minute Adrian tries the bed in her spare bedroom, he instantly imagines the two having sexual intercourse. While she was gone for ten minutes, there were several different phone calls from several different men. She buys Adrian a birthday card. Eventually, Adrian moves on to the Palmer household. Mrs. Hedge takes the news quite lightly, and is not referenced to again.
- Christian Palmer is Adrian's live-in landlord/boss. An undercover popular-culture academic with three precocious children and a babysitting problem. He wears his hair in a 'late-period Elvis' style and has a laugh like a barking dog. He keeps studying popular culture, but keeps getting into narrow scrapes and receiving injuries.
- Cassandra Palmer is the shaven-headed wife of Christian Palmer. She has just returned from filming a documentary on mutilation in Los Angeles, where she learns to function on the cutting edge of politically correct. Her return is not gleefully celebrated in the Palmer household. She removed the bolts from the bathroom door and changed the title of Winnie the Pooh to Winnie the Shit.
- Alpha, Griffith and Tamzin Palmer are the children of Christian and Cassandra. They are afraid of their mother. Christian escapes from her by taking himself and the children to visit his mother in Wigan, leaving Adrian home alone with Cassandra. They are very advanced children; Griffith, only five, has a reading age of thirteen.

== Adrian's neighbours ==
=== Wisteria Walk, Leicester ===
==== Neighbours ====
- Alan Lucas is the Mole family's first neighbour and first boyfriend of Pauline Mole. Alan was an insurance salesman, whose wife left him for another woman - one source of Pauline's embarrassment about the affair. Alan and Pauline ran away to Sheffield, Alan's hunting ground, and here the two bought a flat decorated in the worst taste possible. Alan tried his hardest to get along with his girlfriend's son, but Adrian was still cross with him for stealing his mother. Alan fathered Adrian's half-sister Rosie, and there was much mystery around her parentage. In The Prostate Years, Pauline, Alan, George and Rosie go on The Jeremy Kyle Show to confirm who her father was; the lie detector results showed that Alan Lucas was indeed Rosie's father. Rosie changed her name to Rosie Lucas, called Alan "Dad" and called Adrian's father "George". Pauline was unsure of the father herself but had strong suspicions; she did not possess the Mole cack-handedness and accident prone-ness.
- Mrs. Lucas is the divorced wife of Alan Lucas. She kept the house in check, doing the plumbing, gardening and odd jobs; when she left her husband for another woman, she and the removal women stood and laughed at Alan as he looked down from the window, ashen faced.
- Declan and Caitlin O'Leary are the heads of an Irish family over the road from the Mole family. Mr. O'Leary is a drunk and Mrs. O'Leary is a gossip. They have at least three children; namely Brendan, Sean and Bridget.
- Mr. Singh and his wife Sita move into the house recently vacated by Alan Lucas. When they arrive, Mr. Singh is outraged to find a stack of dirty magazines (named "Amateur Photographer") underneath a loose floorboard. Mrs. Singh is very pretty, keeping her figure hidden behind a sari. The Singhs have lots of children, but the total amount is never specified. Mr. Singh had to leave soon after to care for his ailing parents, leaving his family alone, but later returns. Mrs. Singh looks after Bert Baxter occasionally, but she must be chaperoned and in the end just got rid of him on a Hindu coach trip to Bradford.

==== Around Town ====
- Doreen "Stick Insect" Slater is George Mole's mistress and the mother of his son Brett. She already has a son, Maxwell, by her fiancé Trevor Roper. Doreen is described as thin from top to bottom with no chest, no bum, buck teeth and ginger hair, which leads to her nickname Stick Insect. She slept with George Mole on several occasions - Adrian notices the ginger hairs left on his mother's pillow. After spending a fortune on flowers in a (failed) attempt to woo Pauline, George packs the flowers into the back of his car and drives off in the direction of Doreen's house. Doreen shows up on the Mole family doorstep after Pauline returns, and shows George her baby bump. George is worried, and breaks the news to Pauline and Adrian on holiday in Skegness. Pauline sends him away to look after Doreen, while Pauline calls on Tania Braithwaite to take her home, as well as Tania providing a shoulder to cry on. Doreen dies in a motorbike accident in The Prostrate Years. Brett returns to tell George, Pauline and Adrian, and the family travel down to Bournemouth for Doreen's funeral. Doreen's family look down on George, especially when Maxwell, the vicar, says that Doreen once quoted: "George Mole is the only man I'll ever love; I just live for the day when he'll come back to me". George confides in Adrian that, since Brett's birth, he has been sending £20 a week to her to help her get by. Whether Doreen and Trevor Roper ever get married is not told, but the events at the funeral hint that they never did get married. Doreen became a Hells Angel after her relocation, and this contributes to her death. Doreen dies on 8 August 2007.
- Trevor Roper is Doreen Slater's boyfriend who returns from the Middle East to reclaim her and Maxwell, complete with shedloads of tax-free money and stuffed toy camels. He does not mind about Brett, who was born in his absence; he thinks he was the result of a faulty "coitus interruptus". He and Doreen planned to marry when his divorce came through, but they obviously did not achieve this as she died with her maiden name.
- Rick Lemon is the head of the Off-The-Streets Youth Club. He ends up barring Barry Kent and his skinhead gang, as they cause much of the trouble. Rick takes the entire Club on a hike across the moors, but ends up taking them in totally the wrong direction and gets a telling off from the police. Rick advises Adrian to take life less seriously and have more fun. He is engaged to a woman named Titania, known as 'Tit', and the couple have a baby girl.
- Mr. Cherry is the owner of the local newsagents shop. He takes Adrian on as paper boy and gives him the morning round on Pandora's street, much to his delight. Adrian turned down the evening round on Corporation Row; Barry Kent lives there for a start. Mr. Cherry gave him a pornographic magazine, Big & Bouncy, but Adrian later resigned from his post as paperboy and it states in his cv: "Paperboy at Cherry's Newsagents: resigned after Mr. Cherry tried to pervert me with issues of Big & Bouncy".
- Frederick Kent is Clive and Barry's father. He protests to the local newspaper when Barry is sent home from school for wearing a Union Jack T-shirt; the paper presents the Kents as patriots treated poorly by the school. Frederick is bizarrely described as a World War II veteran alongside a reference to his age - 45 in 1982.
- Edna Kent (previously referred to as Ida Kent) is the mother of Barry Kent. Edna is a rather large woman, who cleans toilets for a living, much to her shame and disgust; though she later attends university and graduates with two degrees. Edna and Barry are in attendance at Pandora's celebration of becoming Leicester's first Labour MP for fifty years. Edna was wearing a green dress with a gold belt. Edna appears sporadically throughout the books. Edna is a widow, as her husband Frederick's death is referenced to in True Confessions. As well as Barry, Frederick and Edna have another son, Clive, and several assorted youngsters.
- Courtney Elliot is the Mole's erudite ex-academic postman with a red-spotted bowtie and a ruffled shirt. He helped Adrian study for his GCE tests. He lends Pauline Mole a fiver when her giro fails to arrive.
- Christine Spicer-Woods represents an independent political party called S.L.A.G. (Socialist Lesbians Against Globalisation) and runs for Leicester MP in the 1997 election; she is defeated when Pandora Braithwaite wins the seat for Labour.
- Mrs Parvez runs Kidcare, the nursery school that William attends. She regularly sends notes home with William, asking for money for various expenses. When William asked where birds sleep at night, Adrian and Mrs Parvez gave him different answers, and got into an argument with each other over who was right. Although Mrs Parvez disapproves of Adrian's parenting style, she has great sympathy for William; at one point getting angry when Adrian was very late and heartbroken William thought he had been abandoned. She is also a Liberal representative on the local council. It is unclear whether she is related to Adrian's friend Mohammed Parvez.
- Lucy is a nurse at Leicester Royal Infirmary, where William goes for an emergency appendix operation. She is a single mother with a three-year-old daughter named Lucinda. Lucy seems to be attracted to Adrian, and Pauline is keen to set them up together; but Adrian rejects Lucy, put off by her hairy wrists (although Pauline suggests he simply buy her a tube of Nair.)

=== West Compton Street, Soho ===
- Norman is the man in the flat next door to Adrian and Bianca's. He works as a fire-eater at a circus and, much to Adrian's chagrin, practises his act in their shared bathroom. He is annoyed at the sound the couple emit during their lovemaking.

=== Arthur Askey Way, Gaitskell Estate ===
==== Neighbours ====
- Vince and Peggy Ludlow are Adrian's neighbours after he moves into his new house with his two sons. The Ludlows and the Moles are separated by a party wall. The family patriarch is a drunkard named Vince who gets arrested for £140 in arrears early through the book, much to the speculation of the street, but Vince returns a few weeks later. The matriarch is a middle-aged lush named Peggy that Adrian takes a fancy to. Peggy dresses in tight leopard-print clothing, all of which is revealing. Both the Ludlows are smokers. They have three dogs and seven children, one of whom is named Brandon and was in a prison abroad. Brandon Ludlow was arrested with a lot of football louts; Peggy says that she will sue the Belgian president, once she finds out who he is. Peggy tells Adrian that Brandon is not like any of her and Vince's other children; Brandon is gentle and takes more of an interest in books than in football. Upon his return, the Ludlow family throw him a party, their second after the celebration they threw when Vince returned from prison. The Ludlows also have a baby daughter that Adrian unofficially names Emily, who he takes shopping as an excuse to see Mary-Lou Hattersly, who runs the crèche at the local Safeway's supermarket. The Ludlow family are fans of The Jerry Springer Show. Peggy finds Vince in bed with their son's best friend, Mandy Trotter, and later says that Mandy is pregnant with Vince's child.
- Sandra Alcock is one of the slags who lives on the Gaitskell Estate. She has a one-night stand with Brett Mole. Adrian discovers her sitting at his kitchen table one morning, and he asks her to cover herself up; she does so by sticking a tea-towel in her bra straps. She later stands under Brett's bedroom window, shouting that Brett is a bastard and that Justine Turner, the girl Brett had cheated on Sandra with, was a slut. The police later arrive and take both Sandra and Justine away.
- Wayne Drabble is an arsonist who burnt down the local Scout hut. In what Adrian describes as "a daring social experiment", Wayne is put in charge of the fireworks display on the common.

==== Around Town ====
- Mrs Parvez runs Kidcare, the nursery school that William attends. She regularly sends notes home with William, asking for money for various expenses. When William asked where birds sleep at night, Adrian and Mrs Parvez gave him different answers, and got into an argument with each other over who was right. Although Mrs Parvez disapproves of Adrian's parenting style, she has great sympathy for William; at one point getting angry when Adrian was very late and heartbroken William thought he had been abandoned. She is also a Liberal representative on the local council. It is unclear whether she is related to Adrian's friend Mohammed Parvez.

=== Rat Wharf, Leicester ===
==== Neighbours ====
- Professor Frank Green is the man occupying the flat underneath Adrian's. He is a professor of science and works at Leicester University. He is a kind, middle-aged man who is more sympathetic than Mia, Adrian's upstairs neighbour. He helps Adrian carry his talking refrigerator from the car park to his flat. He and Mia get agitated at the loud volume at which Adrian plays his music.
- Mia Fox is Adrian's upstairs neighbour. She is a pretty woman, but is mean and insists on peace at all times. She lives a simple life, and maintains absolute silence from Adrian. She, unlike Professor Green, is not happy with Adrian's arrival. Both Mia and Professor Green get agitated by the loud volume at which Adrian plays his music. She works as an air-traffic controller at East Midlands Airport.

==== Around Town ====
===== Leicester =====
- Mark B'astard is the estate agent who sells Adrian his Rat Wharf flat. It is when he goes to urinate that Adrian notices that you can see people's outlines when they are standing in the bathroom. Mark says to his client that it is the sort of flat he would like, but he has three children under five and Mrs. B'astard wants a garden.
- Johnny Bond is Adrian's personal sales adviser at Latesun Ltd. He refuses to give Adrian his £571 payment for a holiday with Glenn in Cyprus, plus the £57.10 deposit, when Adrian wants to cancel his holiday, and he becomes quite nasty instead.
- Sian and Helen are a couple who run a removal service called "Two Gals 'n' a Van". Adrian hires them to help him move into Rat Wharf. He ignores Helen's advice against taking out store cards, inadvertently contributing to his mounting debt problems.

===== Aldershot, Hampshire =====
- Leonard "Len" and Doreen "Dore" Legg are the proprietors of the Lendore Spa Hotel. The couple are miserable, penny-pinching people and are reluctant to give decent bar facilities to George and Pauline Mole and Sharon Bott. The couple charge a ridiculous price for the minibars in their bedrooms. They do not provide bar food after 10:30pm, and do not cook a decent breakfast.

=== Mangold Parva, Leicestershire ===
==== Around Town ====
- Hugo Fairfax-Lycett is Mangold Parva's local aristocrat. He frequents the Bear Inn and, like many others of his fellow barflies, dislikes the smoking ban. He employs Daisy Mole as his PA, a job she previously held in London. Hugo and Daisy eventually develop feelings for each other and start an affair, leading to Daisy leaving Adrian, with the two sharing custody of their daughter Gracie. The couple decide to convert the land surrounding Fairfax Hall into a safari park, much to the anguish of the villagers. They themselves form a mob and march to Fairfax Hall. Hugo, rather conveniently, decides to go for a spin in his quad bike, but after some hours does not return. Daisy calls Adrian and the villagers form a search party, the men hunting Hugo and the women, George and Adrian staying behind to comfort Daisy. Hugo is found underneath his quad bike, having crashed and suffering from minor concussion. After making a full recovery, he and Daisy open up Fairfax Hall to the public, allowing Nigel and Lance to conduct their wedding there. Hugo has two daughters from a previous marriage.
- Mrs. Dorothea Lewis-Masters is an elderly resident of Mangold Parva, and is later engaged to Bernard Hopkins. She writes to her illegitimate son in Timbuktu, the result of an affair between herself and one of her servants when she lived in India. Wendy Wellbeck tells Adrian that she writes to him once a fortnight, sends cards at Christmas and Easter and a birthday card in July. This surprises Adrian; he describes her as "the type of woman who only ever wrote to some distant relation in Sydenham about knitting patterns and the trials of dealing with ones bank via their call centre in Calcutta". She walks with the assistance of a zimmer frame. She and Bernard Hopkins meet and promptly fall in love; yet, Bernard's estranged wife is still alive and living down South. Bernard does not tell Dorothea about his wife, and the two remain engaged. She strongly dislikes hanging baskets - she says that, were she younger, she would steal out at night and deface them, describing them as "the Margaret Thatcher of flower decorations!". She speaks with a strong upper-class accent.
- Tom and Kath Urquhart are the landlords of the local pub, the Bear Inn. The Urquharts marriage is fairly rocky, as Adrian observes Kath and the Bear Inn's trainee chef, Jamie Briton, in an embrace in the steamy kitchen. The Urquharts do a carvery in their pub, all of it microwaved. The Bear Inn is closed down towards the ending of The Prostrate Years, and the Urquharts cash up and move away from Mangold Parva for good.
- Tony and Wendy Wellbeck are the managers of the local post office. Adrian says that the Wellbecks have long since lost track of their stock, as everything is jumbled together. Wendy is somewhat of a village gossip; she is a devout watcher of television soap operas and quips about Adrian's frequent purchases of notepads. Tony, however, respects his fellow villagers and tries to keep his wife from offending everybody. Wendy is in the middle of writing a novel, Puppies and Primroses, which she asks Adrian to read - Adrian knows that from page one he will want to throw up.
- Mrs. Golightly is the grossly overweight maid-of-all-work employed by Mrs. Lewis-Masters. She asks Adrian for a part in his latest play, Plague!, and reveals that she has been compared to Hattie Jacques. She is ultrasensitive about her weight; Mrs. Golightly says that it is her glands, but her employer puts it down to living off Swiss roll. Adrian later sees her in the Bear with her "hangdog" husband.
- Simon is Mangold Parva's local vicar. Adrian sends him the manuscript for his new village play, Plague!. Simon promises to show the manuscript to his wife, once she has finished reading the complete works of Iris Murdoch.
- Marlene Webb owns the local dog kennels, and has 'positively medieval' teeth.
- Lee Grant and Jamie Briton are the chefs at the Bear Inn.

== Adrian's Workmates ==
=== Department of Environmental Health ===
- Mr. Brown is the head of department. He has been having an affair with his secretary, Megan Harris, since 1977. He claims not to have taken a day off work for twenty-two years, saying he has passed several massive kidney stones in the staffroom urinal - which Adrian thinks can account for the cracks in the toilet seat. He spent last Christmas Day at Dungeness, identifying seaweed samples. When Megan briefly ends their affair, Brown cycles to Megan's house and, after starting the affair again, falls down a grassy bank and cracks his coccyx, which leads to at least a fortnight off.
- Mrs. Brown is Brown's wife. She is a pretty woman, but dresses in bad taste and is rather vacant headed. Adrian feels sorry for her, as she is oblivious to her husband's affair.
- Gordon Goffe is Brown's deputy. He weighs twenty stone and is inflated with importance when Brown takes time off after injuring his back, and runs the department with a tighter fist.
- Bill Blane is the head of the Badger department. He becomes part of a love triangle between himself, Megan Harris and Mr. Brown. He and Megan are suspended after Brown caught the two photocopying their private parts, the photographs of which are passed around the office.
- Megan Harris is Brown's secretary. She and Brown are having an affair, but Megan entraps Adrian into the role of her only confidant. Megan briefly ends the affair when Brown forgets her birthday, but Brown cycles her to house in the middle of the night and Megan starts the affair again. Megan starts seeing Bill Blane on the side, and the pair are suspended on full pay when Brown catches them in the act of photocopying their private parts. Adrian later suspects her of giving his letter of resignation to Mr. Brown.
- Julia Stone is Megan's temporary replacement. She is described as "the sort of woman that doesn't lose her money in a coffee machine". Adrian recommends lipstick to improve her appearance.

=== Bellingham's Security Systems ===
- Belinda Bellingham is the attractive owner of the security system company in her late forties. She is a pretty, well-educated woman with a blonde bob. She is George Mole's mistress, and she and George live together for a while, with Belinda futilely attempting to turn George into a social climber. Belinda ends their relationship and sacks George from his job after she finds out he has been selling her alarm systems in back-street boozers for half price. Belinda's selling technique involves cutting harrowing articles on burglary out the scandal rags and sticking them in a portfolio, showing the articles to the client, who instantly bought a home security system.

=== Savage's ===
- Peter Savage, Junior is the alcoholic, smack-happy owner of Savage's restaurant. Savage is a heavy alcoholic and has spent time in rehabilitation for drugs and drunkenness. Savage is in the middle of a divorce with his third wife, Kim. On one occasion, Savage becomes heavily drunk and ends up fighting with a palm tree after accusing it of having an affair with his wife, which results in him being evicted from his own restaurant. Although Savage seems harsh and uncaring, he offers Adrian some disused furniture from the restaurant after his flat is burgled. Savage, a heavy smoker, will gladly shout the intimate details of his clientele's personal lives out in the restaurant. His customers see him as an 'eccentric', but the staff treat him with contempt and often fantasise about killing him.
- Kim Savage is Peter Savage's estranged third wife. Kim has filed for a divorce against her husband, and has gone to the lengths of appearing in the middle of the night, stealing several cases of expensive champagne and left. Savage loves his wife, but disapproves of her job "re-arranging twigs and flowers". Savage once gave Kim money for elocution lessons, but she kept the money and got free lessons from her friend Joanna Lumley - explaining Lumley's lifelong ban from the restaurant.
- Luigi is the Italian maitre'd at Savage's. Luigi is a communist. He greets the guests and shows the guests to their tables. He and Adrian get along well. Luigi develops athlete's foot and is caught washing it in the sink by the health inspectors - violating seventeen of the two-hundred odd counts brought against Savage and his restaurant.
- Roberto is the head chef at Savage's when Adrian joins. By The Cappuccino Years, Roberto has left and Adrian is now in his place.
- Malcolm is the severely under-educated dish washer during Adrian's stint as head chef at Savage's. Malcolm is not especially bright, but Adrian appreciates his friendship. When a cat that looks uncannily like the Downing Street cat, Humphrey, appears at the restaurant it is Malcolm that takes it in and lavishes it with expensive playthings and food. Malcolm christens the cat 'Humfri' as he only understands phonetic spelling. He is a labour supporter.
- Justine A lap-dancer at the Secrets Club in Soho who visits Mole at Savages, as a friend of Adrian's. She is known for a python act. For a short while she becomes the lover of Zippo Montefiori, who describes her thus: "She's a wanker's dream! She's a dislocated wrist! She's duvet heaven!".

=== Brown's Poultry ===
- Mr. Nobby Brown is the proprietor of Brown's Poultry. He employs Adrian and six women in a shed to pluck turkeys for the upcoming Christmas season; the plucking room is right next to the room where the turkeys are slaughtered, which kicks up a terrific noise. Adrian manages to keep his job at the poultry a secret from his family, but the feathers get everywhere - Pauline catches her son blowing the feathers out his underpants with a hairdryer.

=== Eddie's Tea Bar ===
- Eddie and Sandra are the portly couple that run Eddie's Tea Bar. The two seem to have grease running through their bloodstream, as their hair, skin and pores are clogged with it. Eddie gets a headache if he and Sandra do not have sex every day, and he was on Nurofen when Sandra went to the General Hospital to have her veins operated on. The diner does not have an electric till; it is strictly a cash business, keeping coins in an old Cadbury's Luxury Biscuits tin - a cardboard cut-out of Samantha Fox says: "Do not ask for a receipt, as refusal often offends". Banknotes are kept in Eddie's apron pocket. Sandra does 'the books' while watching the omnibus edition of EastEnders, a weekly ritual.

=== The Bookshop ===
- Mr. Hugh Carlton-Hayes is the kindly, homosexual owner of the Carlton-Hayes Bookshop. He and Adrian are very close friends, so much to the point that Carlton-Hayes becomes a surrogate father figure to Adrian. He had two children from a previous marriage, Marcus and Claudia. Whether his previous marriage resulted in widowhood or divorce is unclear, but the marriage is over as Carlton-Hayes lives with his partner, Leslie. He and Michael Flowers once had a fight in the library car park, with Carlton-Hayes walking away the winner. Carlton-Hayes suffers from a liver disease, and is rushed to hospital where he sports blue-and-white striped pyjamas and becomes somewhat addicted to reality television programmes. After he left the hospital, he became unable to walk and had to close up shop due to this and lack of intakes. Adrian still tries to keep contact with his employer after the closure. Carlton-Hayes is a distant relation of Hugo Fairfax-Lycett. The bookshop was started by Hugh's father, Arthur Carlton-Hayes.
- Colonel Bernard Hopkins is an eccentric, frequently drunk and often suicidal man who Adrian calls in (in The Prostrate Years) to look after the bookshop due to the frequent absences of both Carlton-Hayes and himself, due to illness. Bernard seems to have led a colourful life, having been born into a working-class mining family, attended Cambridge on a scholarship, risen to the rank of Colonel in the British Army and spent much of his free time in whorehouses. Adrian notes that Bernard is an expert with antique books but is not very pleasant to customers, to the point where he has been blacklisted from working at any Waterstones or Borders stores. He invites himself to Christmas dinner at Adrian's home and refuses to leave until Adrian has recovered from his prostate cancer, taking up permanent residence. Adrian and Bernard become close friends during Bernard's stay at The Piggeries, helping Adrian with household chores and a friendly ear. He becomes engaged to a local woman in Mangold Parva, Mrs. Dorothea Lewis-Masters, but reveals something else: his legal wife is alive and kicking on the other side of the country. Bernard provides Adrian with chickens and a coop, and pigs with a pigsty.
- Hitesh is a teenager on a work experience placement, whom Carlton-Hayes brought in to manage the computer. When the bookshop closes, Hitesh is not eligible for redundancy pay as he had not been employed for two years or more. Hitesh says that he will get a job at KFC, where his cousin is manager.
- Leslie is Carlton-Hayes's partner. His gender remains unspecified until The Prostrate Years, when Adrian, Hitesh and Bernard Hopkins visit him at home. Leslie worries deeply for his partner's welfare. He sometimes covers for other staff members when they are ill.

== Leicestershire & Rutland Creative Writing Group ==
- Ken Blunt is the longest-serving member of the LRWG. He speaks his mind, and is strongly anti-American to the point where his wife, Glenda, refuses to have Coca-Cola in their house. When Adrian's 'special guest' at the group's annual Christmas dinner turns out to be Michael Flowers, Ken and Glenda are the most disappointed and angry. Ken later confides in Adrian that he has a mistress, and gives Adrian her address so he can inform her in case anything happens to him. Ken works for Walkers crisps.
- Gary Milksop is the extremely sensitive, effeminate and over-the-top member of the LRWG. He is the author of an epic (unfinished) experimental novel that he has been working on for fifteen years: his first experience of eating a Hobnob. The other members of the group are kinder to him, as Gary cries if he gets criticism.
- Gladys Fordingbridge is the elderly regular host of the group. She is the only woman. Her living room is cluttered with cat hairs and photographs of distant relatives. Her poems consist entirely of sub-Pam Ayres cat poems, one of which, entitled Naughty Paws, managed to rhyme "Whiskas" with "discus". When her poems are eventually published it gives Adrian an excuse to expel her from the group as it is 'for amateurs only'. Gladys happily leaves the club.

== Pen-pals ==
- Hamish Mancini is Adrian's American pen-pal. The boys meet at Loch Lomond, where their mothers are on holiday with their partners. Adrian and Hamish swap addresses and write to each other regularly. Hamish comes over to visit Adrian in 1983, but is under the impression that Adrian lives in a thatched cottage, and makes the poor taxi driver drive around Leicester for three solid hours and then eventually pays the man in dollar notes. Hamish goes back home a few weeks later. Hamish re-establishes contact in The Lost Diaries, asking when he and his kleptomaniac mother, fresh from the Betty Ford clinic, can come and visit. Adrian takes advantage of the foot-and-mouth disease epidemic and gives Hamish an overly exaggerated account of the situation. Hamish sends over a sack of Idaho potatoes, which are withheld at Heathrow Airport. Hamish and Adrian do not speak to each other after the incident. Adrian gives Hamish such a terrible account because he does not have enough pillowcases and anyway, Hamish and his mother talk in exclamation marks.
- Grace Pool is a prisoner at Holloway, where Adrian's aunt Susan works. Susan gives him a toothbrush holder that Grace made for him in a prison art class, and insists he write Grace a thank you letter. Grace is due for parole and expresses her desire to meet Adrian, causing him to panic; but, to his relief, she commits arson at the prison and her parole is cancelled.
