= The Secret Diary of Adrian Mole, Aged 13¾ (upcoming TV series) =

British television series

- Based on: The Secret Diary of Adrian Mole, Aged 13¾ by Sue Townsend
- Screenplay by: David Nicholls; Caitlin Moran; Caroline Moran; Dillon Mapletoft; Oliver Taylor; Jack Rooke
- Directed by: Alex Winckler
- Starring: Oliver Savell; Lisa McGrillis; Colin Hoult; Pam Ferris
- Country of origin: United Kingdom
- Original language: English
- No. of series: 1

Production
- Executive producers: Kenton Allen; Luke Alkin; David Nicholls; Jane Villiers
- Producer: Charlotte Robinson
- Production companies: Big Talk Productions; Sayle Screen

The Secret Diary of Adrian Mole, Aged 13¾ is an upcoming British television series adaptation of the novel of the same name by Sue Townsend. The cast is led by Oliver Savell as Adrian Mole.

== Cast ==
- Oliver Savell as Adrian Mole
- Lisa McGrillis as Pauline Mole
- Colin Hoult as George Mole
- Pam Ferris as Grandma
- Galaxie Clear as Pandora Braithwaite
- Alun Armstrong as Bert Baxter
- Jude Forsey as Nigel Partridge
- Rory Keenan as Mr Lucas
- David Wilmot as Mr Scruton
- Karl Collins as Mr Cherry

== Production ==
=== Development ===
The ten-part series is produced by Big Talk Productions. It is a television adaptation for the BBC of the Sue Townsend 1982 novel The Secret Diary of Adrian Mole, Aged 13¾ with David Nicholls and Caitlin Moran among the writers alongside Caroline Moran, Dillon Mapletoft, Oliver Taylor, and Jack Rooke. It is directed by Alex Winckler and produced by Charlotte Robinson with executive producers Kenton Allen and Luke Alkin for Big Talk, and Nicholls. The estate of Sue Townsend is represented by Jane Villiers at Sayle Screen.

=== Casting ===
The cast is led by Oliver Savell as Adrian Mole with Lisa McGrillis as his mother and Colin Hoult as his father, with Pam Ferris as his grandmother. Other cast additions in April 2026 included Galaxie Clear, Alun Armstrong, Jude Forsey, Rory Keenan and David Wilmot.

=== Filming ===
Principal photography was underway in Hartlepool and County Durham in March 2026, with first-look images from filming released to the media the following month. Filming continued that year with locations including Sunderland, Brinkburn and Tyneside.
