= Woodbine (cigarette) =

British cigarette brand

- Product type: Cigarette
- Current owner: Imperial Tobacco
- Country: England
- Introduced: 1888; 138 years ago
- Markets: United Kingdom, Ireland
- Previous owners: W.D. & H.O. Wills

Woodbine is a British brand of cigarettes owned and manufactured by Imperial Brands. Woodbine cigarettes are named after the woodbine flowers, native to Eurasia.

== History ==
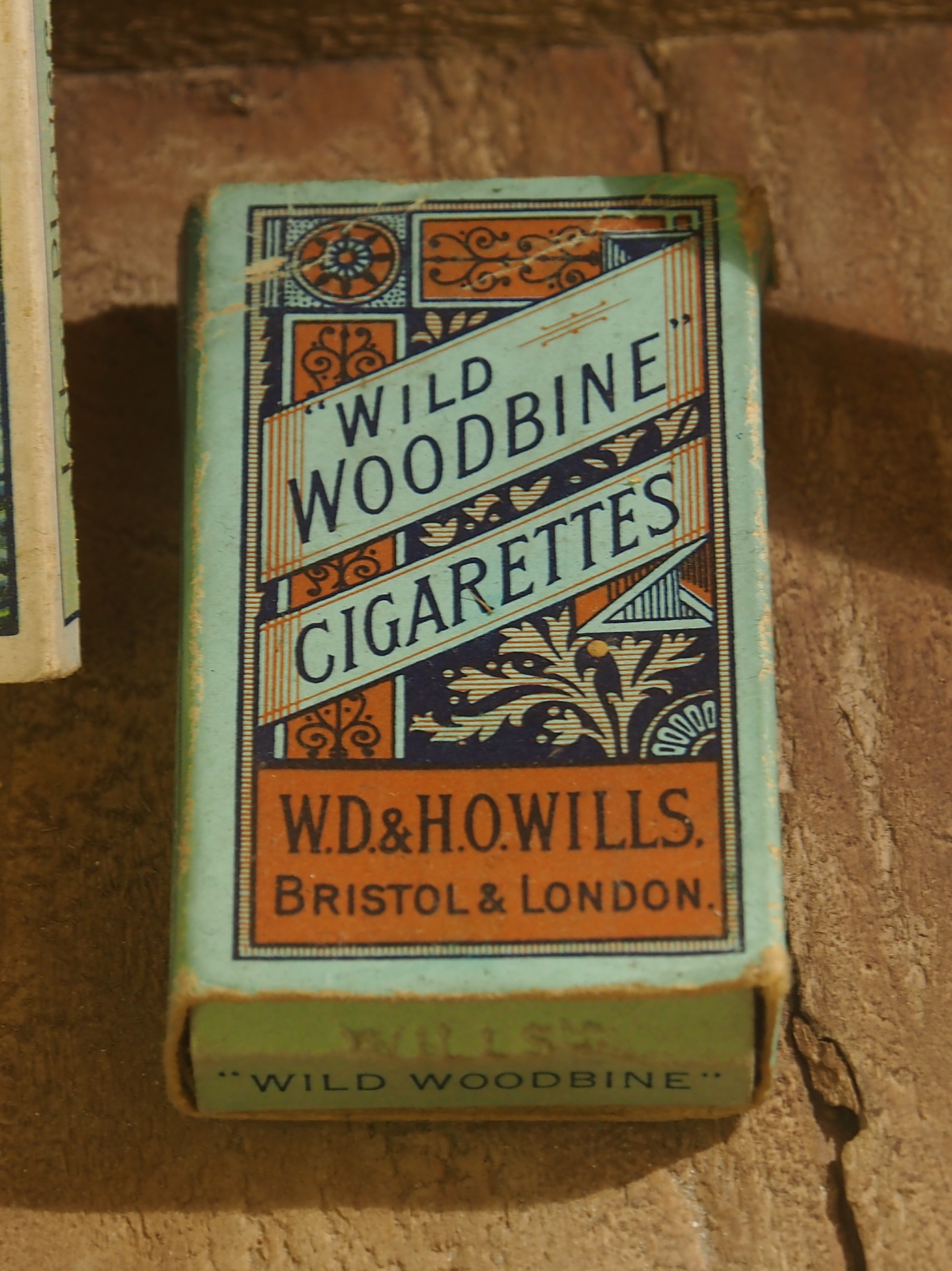
An old pack of British Woodbine cigarettes, photographed at the Musée Somme 1916 of Albert (Somme), France

Woodbine was launched in 1888 by W.D. & H.O. Wills. Noted for its strong unfiltered cigarettes, the brand was cheap and popular in the early 20th century with the working-class, as well as with army men during the First and Second World War. In the Great War, the British Army chaplain Geoffrey Studdert Kennedy MC was affectionately nicknamed "Woodbine Willie" by troops on the Western Front to whom he handed out cigarettes along with Bibles and spiritual comfort. In the 1890s, Woodbine cigarettes were offered at a margin of 19%, with a possible maximum discount of 10%. In the United Kingdom, the brand was sold at very low advertising costs and total expenditure on sales promotion for all cigarettes and tobacco brands in 1925 was only 2d per pound of tobacco sold.

The intricate nineteenth century packet design remained in use until the mid 1960s. Although Wills changed the packaging, Woodbine sales continued to drop.

In common parlance, the unfiltered high-tar Woodbine was one of the brands collectively known as "gaspers" until about 1950, because new smokers found their harsh smoke difficult to inhale.

A filtered version was launched in the United Kingdom in 1948, but was discontinued in 1988. Woodbines came in four different packs: 5 cigarettes, 10 cigarettes, 20 cigarettes and 50 cigarettes.

They were often known as "Woodies".

== Marketing ==
In the 1960s, a few television ads were made in which Gordon Rollings played a man who engaged in numerous activities (including waiting for the bus or setting up a beach chair) and would always end in misery. He then would grab a packet of Woodbines from his pocket and light one, followed by a happy tune and a man reading the line "Light up life with a Woodbine! It's Britain's best-selling cigarette!". at the end.

The ads were never played on TV however, as all television commercials for cigarettes were banned on 1 August 1965. A jingle was also made to promote Woodbine in the late 1950s or early 1960s.

== In popular culture ==
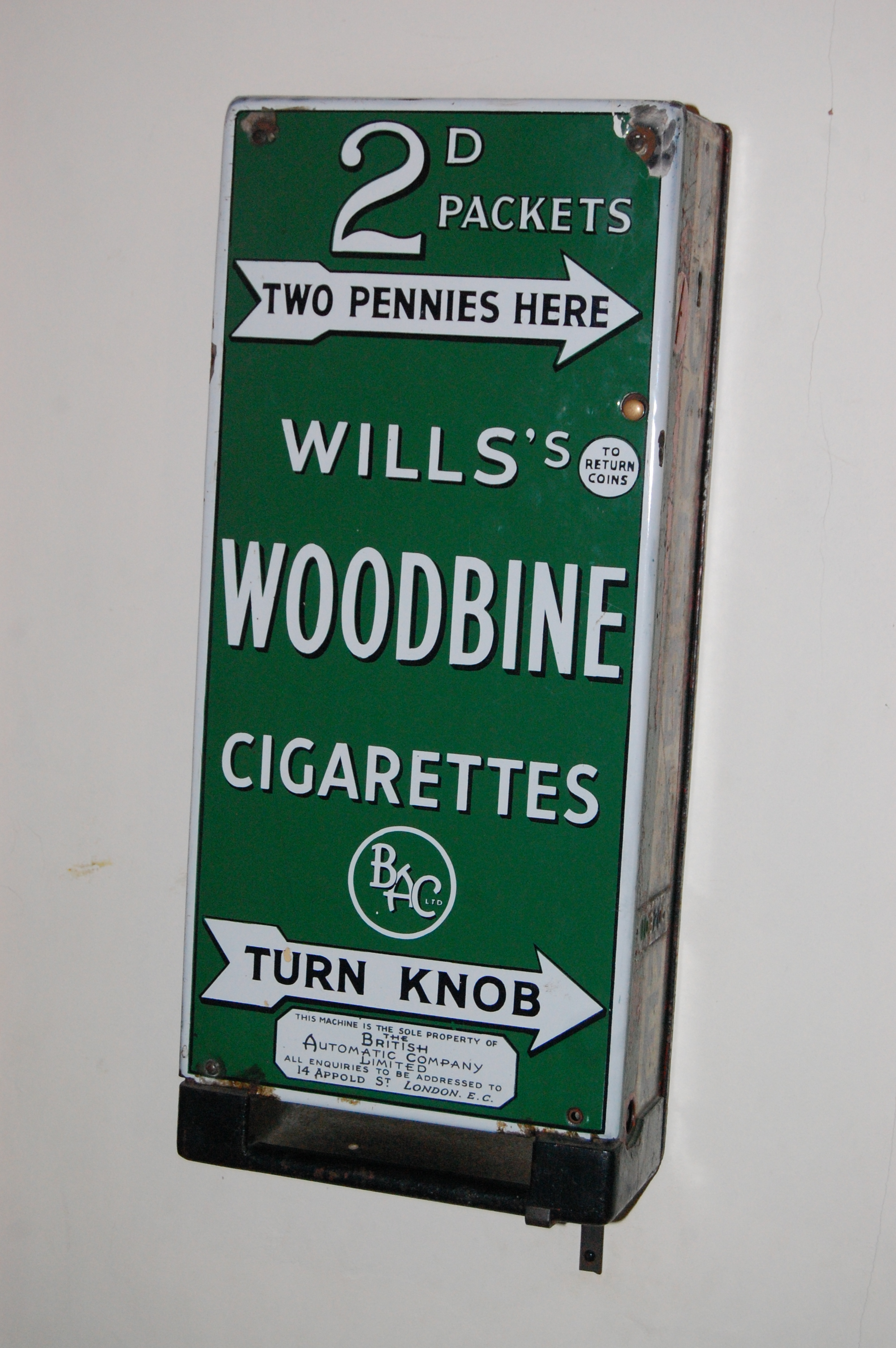
A Woodbine vending machine, now in the Staffordshire County Museum at Shugborough Hall, England

- Woodbines were the oft-mentioned cigarette of choice for Tristan Farnon (Brian Sinclair), the younger of the two veterinary brothers in James Herriot's semi-autobiographical All Creatures Great and Small series.
- Princess Alice of Battenberg, mother of Prince Philip and mother-in-law of Queen Elizabeth II, who founded a nursing order of Greek Orthodox nuns in 1949, smoked Woodbines. Prince Philip's biographer Gyles Brandreth wrote of Princess Alice during her time at Buckingham Palace, "They say you could always tell when she was coming along the corridor because of the whiff of Woodbines in the air. The idea of the Duke of Edinburgh’s mum, dressed as a nun, sucking on her Woodbine… it’s wonderful!"
- Legendary North East England comedian Bobby Thompson always smoked Woodbines on stage and also mentioned them frequently in his act.
- John Lennon was originally fond of smoking Woodbines while he was a student and into the early 1960s, before switching to smoking the French-made Gauloises Bleues. After switching, Lennon mocked the use of Woodbines during a documentary film that chronicled the Beatles' first visit to America.
- Van Morrison, a Northern Irish singer-songwriter, mentions buying Woodbines in the song "Cleaning Windows" ("Bought five Woodbines at the shop on the corner // And went straight back to work") as a pictorial description of the main character of the song, who is a simple working man.
- Flogging Molly, an Irish-American Celtic punk band, mentions smoking Woodbines in their song "Factory Girls". The song is about an old woman, and has the line, "Choking on Woodbine // cigarettes just kill time."
- In the Adrian Mole series of novels and related TV series, old aged pensioner character Bert Baxter had often smoked Woodbines as depicted.
- In the 1992 film Howards End, Leonard Bast (Samuel West) references the brand while telling the Schlegel sisters (Emma Thompson and Helena Bonham Carter) about his all-night walk through the forest. He describes how tired and hungry he was by dawn: “I didn't know when you're walking, you want breakfast, lunch and tea during the night as well. And all I had was a packet of Woodbines." His working-class position and accent indicate the brand may be a cheap favourite.
- Woodbines are mentioned in Sheffield United's club anthem "The Greasy Chip Butty Song".
- Gordon Landsborough's Glasshouse Gang war series include several characters smoking Woodbines (often until so short as to burn their lips), Landsborough using the popularity of these cigarettes among British soldiers especially of lower class background.
- Woodbines are the brand smoked by the protagonist in Brian Moore's The Emperor of Ice-Cream.

Some late 19th- to early 20th-century steamships sported as many as five long and thin smokestacks (sometimes including a dummy one), notably the Russian cruiser Askold, earning them the nickname "packet of woodbines" among sailors.

== See also ==
- Tobacco smoking
