= Rosie Mole =

Fictional character in Sue Townsend's Adrian Mole series

Rosie Germaine Mole is a fictional character in Sue Townsend's Adrian Mole series. Rosie is Adrian's sister, and first appears in the book The Growing Pains of Adrian Mole. She is very close to her brother Adrian. He thinks that Rosie is the only member of his family who really understands him.

== Birth and family ==
Rosie was born during the events of the second Adrian Mole novel, The Growing Pains of Adrian Mole. Her birth occurs in Royal Hospital in Ashby-de-la-Zouch, Leicestershire, England. Her mother is Pauline Sugden-Mole (1944) and her father is George Mole. She has a grandmother and grandfather Sugden (parents of Pauline) and a grandmother Edna May Mole (mother of George). George's father Albert (Adrian's middle name) died before the series begins.

Her middle name, Germaine, was given by her mother Pauline in honour of Germaine Greer, the famous feminist.

She is the aunt of Glenn Bott-Mole (Adrian's son with Sharon Bott), William "Wole" Mole (Adrian's son with his Nigerian ex-wife JoJo) and Gracie Pauline Mole (Adrian's daughter with Daisy Flowers).

== Rosie as a character ==
Rosie is a rebel. She always wears make-up and her clothes are always trendy. She has had many boyfriends, becoming pregnant by one (who breaks up with her) and having an abortion. In Adrian Mole and the Weapons of Mass Destruction, she has a very complicated boyfriend, to whom she gives money for drugs and drink. Rosie lies to her mother that she needs money for her studies. Adrian knows the truth, but keeps silent, even though he disapproves of Rosie's behaviour.

Her favourite group is the Spice Girls and she models her clothes after members of the group, particularly Emma Bunton.

Rosie goes to school at "Neil Armstrong Comprehensive School", the old school of her brother Adrian, in Ashby-de-la-Zouch.

When she was a little girl, Rosie didn't like Adrian, believing that he wasn't fun to be around. However, later Rosie and Adrian became very close, Adrian being the only person she told about her pregnancy. She asks him to help her get an abortion.

In Adrian Mole: The Cappuccino Years, Rosie becomes pregnant by her boyfriend Aaron Michaelwhite. Adrian is the only person whom she tells. He buys her a mock baby doll of the kind used to educate girls of the reality of child rearing, which Rosie names "Ashby," so Rosie can make up her mind about whether she is ready for motherhood; Rosie decides to have an abortion. Aaron and Rosie break up on 18 October 1997.
