= Pauline Mole =

- First appearance: 1982
- Created by: Sue Townsend
- Portrayed by: Julie Walters; Lulu; Alison Steadman

In-universe information
- Aliases: Pauline Monica Mole; Pauline Hilda Mole; Pauline Muffet; Pauline Braithwaite; Pauline Sugden
- Nickname: Paulie
- Gender: Female
- Occupation: Estate agent Shopping centre security manager
- Spouses: George Mole (1967–1990, 1993–1997, 2001–present); Martin Muffet (1990–1992); Ivan Braithwaite (1999–2001)
- Significant other: Alan Lucas (1982)
- Children: Adrian Albert Mole (by George Mole); Rosie Germaine Mole ''(by Alan Lucas)
- Relatives: Mr Sugden (father); Mrs. Sugden (mother); Dennis Sugden (brother); Pete Sugden (brother); Marcia Sugden (sister-in-law); Yvonne Sugden (sister-in-law); Maurice Sugden (nephew); Glenn Bott-Mole (grandson); William 'Wole' Mole (grandson); Gracie Mole (granddaughter)
- Nationality: British

Pauline Monica Mole (or Pauline Hilda, depending on the book) (née Sugden, previously Muffet and Braithwaite) is a fictional character from the Adrian Mole series, written by Sue Townsend. She is the mother of Adrian. In The Secret Diary of Adrian Mole, Aged 13¾, she is portrayed as a feminist who disappoints her son for not living up to his notion of the ideal mother.

== Biography ==
Pauline was born on the 14th September 1944 among the potato fields of Norfolk. She was the only girl, with two brothers called Dennis and Pete. She loathed this lifestyle, and when she fell in love with George Mole, she jumped at the chance to marry him. What she and George were unaware of was that when they got married, she was three months pregnant with Adrian.

Pauline rejected Adrian for the first year of his life, leaving George to look after him and get taunted by the other men.

In 1981, Pauline has enough of George and has an affair with the Mole family's neighbour, Alan Lucas. She and Lucas eloped to Sheffield, and after they break off their relationship they secretly reconcile and Pauline becomes pregnant with a daughter, Rosie Germaine. Rosie's paternity is not solved until The Prostrate Years, when they take the case to The Jeremy Kyle Show. The blood test results show Rosie is Lucas' daughter, leaving Pauline disgraced and George heartbroken. Pauline is 'seventy per cent sure' that Adrian is George's; she was friendly with a maggot farmer, Ernie, before Adrian was born.

Pauline leaves George twice afterwards – both times she gets married. The first time was to an engineer, Martin Muffet, despite him being twenty-seven years younger than Pauline. She divorced him when he eloped with Adrian's girlfriend Bianca Dartington, also an engineer.

She remarries George, and divorces him later. She marries Ivan Braithwaite, the father of Pandora, the Ashby-de-la-Zouch Labour representative, whilst George marries Pandora's mother, Tania. It became known as 'The Great Mole/Braithwaite Parent Swap'.

After Ivan dies from drowning, George leaves Tania and remarries the widowed Pauline again, prompting large media press. The couple sell their home in Wisteria Walk, Adrian and Rosie's childhood home, and buy two old pigsties which they convert into a semi-detached property, They inhabit one house, and Adrian inhabits the other with his wife Daisy and daughter Gracie. During the renovation, George suffers from a stroke and puts his back out, which therefore confines him to a wheelchair. Pauline doesn't know how to cope with the strain. When she finds out her first grandchild, Glenn, is going to be a father, she is excited at the thought of being a great-grandmother, as "she still kept her legs!".

== Television ==
In The Secret Diary of Adrian Mole, she is portrayed by Julie Walters. In its follow-on series, The Growing Pains of Adrian Mole, she is played by Lulu and by Alison Steadman in Adrian Mole:The Cappuccino Years

== See also ==
- List of Adrian Mole characters
