= The Secret Diary of Adrian Mole, Aged 13¾ =

1982 book by Sue Townsend

- First edition
- Author: Sue Townsend
- Cover artist: Caroline Holden
- Language: English
- Series: Adrian Mole
- Genre: Young adult novel
- Publisher: Methuen
- Publication date: 7 October 1982
- Publication place: United Kingdom
- Media type: Print (Hardback & Paperback)
- Pages: 259 pp
- ISBN: 0-413-50890-0
- Followed by: The Growing Pains of Adrian Mole

The Secret Diary of Adrian Mole, Aged 13¾ is the first book in the Adrian Mole series of comedic fiction, written by English author Sue Townsend. The book is written in a diary style, and focuses on the worries and regrets of a teenager who believes himself to be an intellectual. The story is set in 1981 and 1982, and in the background it refers to some of the historic events of the time, such as the Falklands War and the wedding of Lady Diana and Prince Charles as well as the birth of Prince William. Mole is a fierce critic of prime minister Margaret Thatcher, listing her as one of his worst enemies.

Apart from the humorous events described in the diary, a lot of the book's humour originates from the unreliable narration of Mole, who naïvely, yet confidently, misinterprets events around him.

The book was first published in hardcover by Methuen on 7 October 1982. Sequels include (in chronological order):

- The Growing Pains of Adrian Mole
- The True Confessions of Adrian Albert Mole
- Adrian Mole and the Small Amphibians (all of which were contained in Adrian Mole: From Minor to Major)
- Adrian Mole: The Wilderness Years
- Adrian Mole: The Cappuccino Years
- Adrian Mole and the Weapons of Mass Destruction
- Adrian Mole: The Prostrate Years

== Reception ==
The book was a best-seller, and had sold 1.9 million copies by November 1985. It won the Australian BILBY Older Readers Award in 1990. In 2003, it was listed at No. 112 on the BBC's The Big Read poll of the UK's best-loved books. In November 2019, BBC News included The Secret Diary of Adrian Mole, Aged 13¾ on its list of the 100 most influential novels.

== Adaptations ==
A 7-part radio series on BBC Radio 4 featured extracts from the book read by Nicholas Barnes. Townsend adapted the book for the stage in 1984 with music by Ken Howard and Alan Blaikley. There was also a 1985 television series.

A successful stage production ran at the Wyndham's Theatre, London, in 1984–1986, that included Simon Gipps-Kent and followed with a road tour.

A stage musical adaptation by Jake Brunger and Pippa Cleary opened at Leicester's Curve Theatre in March 2015. Townsend had been working on the project at the time of her death in 2014.

A television series adaptation for the BBC with David Nicholls and Caitlin Moran among the writers with a cast led by Oliver Savell and Lisa McGrillis began filming in 2026.
