= The Lost Diaries of Adrian Mole, 1999–2001 =

2008 book by Sue Townsend

- Author: Sue Townsend
- Language: English
- Series: Adrian Mole
- Publisher: Michael Joseph
- Publication date: 2008
- Publication place: United Kingdom
- Pages: 320
- ISBN: 9780241959398
- Preceded by: Adrian Mole: The Cappuccino Years
- Followed by: Adrian Mole and the Weapons of Mass Destruction

The Lost Diaries of Adrian Mole, 1999–2001 is a book in the Adrian Mole series, written by Sue Townsend. Chronologically the sixth book in the series, it was published in 2008, four years after Adrian Mole and the Weapons of Mass Destruction, which covers Adrian's life in 2002–2003. The book is a collection of diary entries that were originally published in The Guardian as 'The Diary of a Provincial Man'.

== Plot summary ==
The book begins in November 1999, with Adrian and his two children Glenn and William living at his mother's house in Ashby-de-la-Zouch following the fire that destroyed his house at the end of The Cappuccino Years. His mother Pauline is now living at the Mole family home in Wisteria Walk and marries Ivan Braithwaite, father of Adrian's childhood sweetheart Pandora. Adrian's father George is living at the Braithwaite family home 'The Lawns' with Ivan's ex-wife Tania, who he has recently married.

Adrian continues to write his 'serial killer-comedy' "The White Van" and briefly finds work as a turkey plucker. His mother forces him to leave Wisteria Walk after he fails to visit her in hospital, and he temporarily lives at The Lawns before being allocated a council house on the rough Gaitskell Estate, where he becomes neighbours to the notorious Ludlow family. He also begins an on-off relationship with his housing officer Pamela Pigg, but is still in love with Pandora, now a Labour MP for Ashby.

His father spends several months in hospital with a series of infections he contracts while recovering from falling off a ladder. Adrian ends up looking after an elderly woman, Mrs Wormington, but she dies from hypothermia as a result of a trip to Mablethorpe. He also begins working in a burger van in a layby although he takes numerous days off and eventually resigns. After Ivan returns to The Lawns following his sectioning, George is released from hospital; he and Pauline subsequently reconcile and announce plans to marry each other for a third time.

Adrian becomes curious about his half-brother Brett, but this develops into jealousy after he discovers Brett is a successful student at the University of Oxford. Brett visits and ends up staying with Adrian following the September 11 attacks. He spends his time filming documentaries on reactions to the attacks and on poverty. The book ends with Adrian being arrested in a dawn raid after planning a rally to protest about the arrest of his schoolfriend Mohammed, who works at a local BP garage.
