= Adrian Mole: The Wilderness Years =

1993 Book by Sue Townsend

- First edition
- Author: Sue Townsend
- Language: English
- Series: Adrian Mole
- Publisher: Methuen
- Publication date: 31 August 1993
- Publication place: United Kingdom
- Preceded by: Adrian Mole and the Small Amphibians
- Followed by: Adrian Mole: The Cappuccino Years

Adrian Mole: The Wilderness Years is the fourth book in the Adrian Mole series, written by Sue Townsend. It focuses on the worries of the now-adult Mole. The book was first published in 1993 by Methuen. It is set in 1991 to the first part of 1992 and Adrian is 23¾ years of age.

The book covers the same themes as the first volumes and continues the regular format of a diary.

== Plot summary ==
The book charts the progress of Adrian's wavering love life; he begins infatuated, as ever, with Pandora Braithwaite, with whom he is sharing a flat in Oxford (although as her boyfriend Jack Cavendish also lives there, chances of romance are slim). His chasing after Pandora finally ends when she finds Adrian's list of ways of torturing her current partner and recommends a psychotherapist, Leonora de Witt, with whom Adrian is immediately smitten. Leonora fends off all of Adrian's attempts to get to know her better, and indirectly leads him to his next love, Bianca, an engineer from London. His relationship with Bianca is fully enjoyable and looks promising until she runs off with his mother's husband, Martin (also an engineer). However, he soon meets Jo Jo, a worker at Savage's, a horrible Soho restaurant where he found employment.

While writing from Greece, on a cruise which doubles as a writer's course. Adrian is thrilled to learn that "the book without language", a concept he touched upon in his otherwise terrible novel in progress, Lo! The Flat Hills Of My Homeland, caught the attention of Angela Hacker, who has recommended him to an agent.

Adrian suffers his usual litany of humiliations, including becoming host to childhood nemesis Barry Kent upon Kent's release from prison. In short order, Barry becomes Oxford's latest literary darling, while Adrian toils away at his little read novels.

The book has a happy ending despite the low self-esteem, career failures, and loneliness of the protagonist, as he has success in romance and comes to live carefree. However, at the beginning of the next book, set years later after the longest gap between entries in the series, he has divorced Jo Jo and descended back into frustration.

== Reception ==
In a retrospective review on PopMatters, critic Mike Cormack said, "The Wilderness Years is the pinnacle of the Adrian Mole books because it commits fully to its subject – comedy sharpened into clarity – with the full range of human emotions and experience, and a period portrayal by one of Britain’s sharpest of cultural observers. The Adrian Mole books may feel slighter than most serious fiction because of their readability and comedy, but as portraits of humanity, they are more profound and certainly wiser than the heavyweights who strain to impress."

== Selected editions ==
- Methuen Publishing Company, hardback, 1993 (hardback). ISBN 0-413-65010-3.
- Arrow Books, 1994 (paperback). ISBN 0-7493-1683-7.
- Penguin Books, 2003 (paperback). ISBN 0-14-101088-6.
