= Adrian Mole: The Cappuccino Years (TV series) =

2001 British television series

- Directed by: Sandy Johnson
- Country of origin: United Kingdom
- Original language: English
- No. of series: 1
- No. of episodes: 6

Production
- Running time: 30 minutes

Original release
- Network: BBC One
- Release: 2 February – 9 March 2001

Related
- The Secret Diary of Adrian Mole, Aged 13¾; The Growing Pains of Adrian Mole

Adrian Mole: The Cappuccino Years is a British television series which was first aired on BBC One in 2001. The series was based on the fifth book from the Adrian Mole series, The Cappuccino Years. The series was produced by Tiger Aspect/Little Dancer Production for the BBC. Like the previous two TV series of Adrian Mole, this one also consists of 6 episodes. This was the final TV series produced based on the Adrian Mole series of books.

== Premise ==
The series followed the plot of the book fairly closely and was set around 1997, starting in May 1997 when Tony Blair and New Labour won the general election.

== Cast ==
- Adrian Mole – Stephen Mangan
- Pandora Braithwaite – Helen Baxendale
- Pauline Mole – Alison Steadman
- George Mole – Alun Armstrong
- Ivan Braithwaite – James Hazeldine
- Tania Braithwaite – Zoë Wanamaker
- William Mole – Harry Tones
- Sharon Bott – Ruth Jones
- Glenn Bott – Alexander De'Ath
- Archie – Joseph O'Conor
- Rosie Mole – Melissa Batchelor
- Nigel Hetherington – Roderic Culver
- Peter Savage – Keith Allen
- Eleanor Flood – Pooky Quesnel
