= Adrian Mole =

Fictional youngster in comic novels by Sue Townsend

- First appearance: The Secret Diary of Adrian Mole, Aged 13¾ (1982)
- Last appearance: The Prostrate Years (2009)
- Created by: Sue Townsend
- Portrayed by: Simon Schatzberger (1984 play); Gian Sammarco (TV 1985–87); Stephen Mangan (TV 2001); Joel Fossard-Jones, Lewis Andrews, Sebastian Croft, Toby Murray, Benjamin Lewis, Ilan Galkoff, Samuel Menhinick (musical 2015–17)
- Born: 2 April 1967 (age 59)

In-universe information
- Full name: Adrian Albert Mole
- Alias: Nigel Mole
- Nicknames: Moley, Brains, Aidy
- Gender: Male
- Occupation: Writer, TV chef, bookshop employee
- Family: George Mole (father); Pauline Mole (mother); Brett Slater (half-brother); Rosie Mole (half-sister)
- Spouses: JoJo Mapfuso; Daisy Flowers
- Children: Glenn Bott-Mole (by Sharon Bott); William (Wole) Mole (by JoJo); Gracie Mole (by Daisy)
- Relatives: Unnamed grandchild; Albert Mole (grandfather); Edna Mole (grandmother); Susan Mole (aunt); Mr Sugden (grandfather); Mrs Sugden (grandmother); Dennis Sugden (uncle); Pete Sugden (uncle); Maurice Sugden (cousin)
- Religion: Church of England, later atheist
- Nationality: British

Adrian Albert Mole is the protagonist of a series of novels by the English author Sue Townsend, written in the form of diaries. The character first appeared (as "Nigel") as part of a comic diary featured in a short-lived arts magazine (called simply magazine) published in Leicester in 1980, and shortly afterward in a BBC Radio 4 play in 1982. The books are written in the form of a diary, with some additional content such as correspondence. The first two books appealed to many readers as a realistic and humorous treatment of the inner life of an adolescent boy, and capturing the zeitgeist of the UK during the Thatcher period.

== Themes ==
The first books concentrate on Adrian's desires and ambitions in life (to marry his teenage sweetheart, publish his poetry and novels, obtain financial security) and his complete failure to achieve them. The series satirises human pretensions, and especially, in the first couple of volumes, teenage pretensions.

The second theme is depiction of the social and political situation in Britain, with particular reference to left-wing politics in the 1980s in the first three books. For example, Mr and Mrs Mole's divorce reflects rising divorce rates in the 1980s, and living together unmarried was becoming a norm. Adrian's mother becomes a staunch feminist and briefly joins the Greenham Common campaigners. Pandora, Adrian's love interest, and her parents are part of an intellectualised and left-wing middle class that attempted to embrace the working class.

Humour arises from the outworking of larger social forces within a very ordinary household in a very ordinary part of Middle England.

The last three books move in slightly new directions, showing Adrian as an adult in different environments. They have a stronger element of political satire, mainly examining New Labour, and in Weapons of Mass Destruction, the Iraq War. The intervening book, Adrian Mole: The Wilderness Years, mixes these themes, with events such as the Gulf War seen from Adrian's naive and frustrated point of view, as well as depictions of his experiences of unemployment and public spending cutbacks, both major political issues at the time. In dealing with political events, a constant plot device is that Adrian makes confident predictions and statements that are known to be wrong by the reader, ranging from belief in the Hitler Diaries to an Iraqi victory in the Gulf War and the existence of their weapons of mass destruction.

== Biography ==
Adrian Albert Mole is born 2 April, with the first book establishing the year as 1967. He grows up with his parents in the city of Leicester; before moving to Ashby-de-la-Zouch in England's East Midlands. Adrian's family are largely unskilled working class/lower middle class. He is an only child until the age of 15, when his half-brother Brett and half-sister Rosie are born. Adrian is not gifted academically but does tolerably well at school, though he does sometimes suffer the ire of headmaster "Pop-Eye" Scruton. Though not especially popular he has a small circle of friends and even a girlfriend Pandora Braithwaite (whose parents Ivan and Tania are affluent Trotskyites). At one point he falls into bad company with Barry Kent and his gang, who had bullied him in earlier years, but generally he keeps out of trouble. Throughout all this Adrian sees himself as an "intellectual" and a thwarted "Great Writer".

Ironically Adrian actually is a good writer, as the quality of his diaries attests, but he feels he must adopt a "high" or avant-garde literary style to be taken seriously. His novel Lo! The Flat Hills of My Homeland is unsurprisingly never published: the few passages included in the diaries are painful to read (though Adrian himself regards them as "magnificent"), and the first few drafts were even written without vowels. Over several books he develops a script for a white van serial killer comedy programme which the BBC is reluctant to produce. Another of his works, The Restless Tadpole: An Opus, is described by one potential agent as "effete crap".

As a young man he moves to London and takes a job in a Soho restaurant catering to media types. London is going through a foodie renaissance and offal is all the rage. Adrian is persuaded to feature as a celebrity chef in a television cookery programme called Offally Good!; although he is told the programme is a comedy, he typically fails to realise he is being set up as the stooge, the comic straight man. He is contracted to write a book to accompany the show, but is suffering from writer's block, so his mother eventually writes it for him, without his knowledge, with a dedication reading "To my beloved mother, Pauline Mole, who has nurtured me and inspired me throughout my life. Without this magnificent woman's wisdom and erudition I could not have written this book."

Adrian befriends an old pensioner called Archie Tait whilst he is living back at home with his mother. When Archie dies, Adrian goes to live in his old house, since Archie had no real ties. He finds out that Glenn Bott is his son and cannot pay Sharon all the money, so he cares for Glenn full-time. Glenn's remedial teacher, Eleanor Flood, a convicted arsonist, burns Archie's old house down.

Adrian ends up working in an antiquarian bookshop. Having lived in relative poverty for much of his life, and for some time in London in actual squalor, he overextends himself financially, lured by the banks' promises of easy credit, and buys a converted loft apartment, at Rat Wharf. He is terrorized by swans, buys a talking fridge, and enjoys his newfound freedom as his children are "off his hands". Glenn is now in the British Army while William is living with his mother and Mole's ex-wife, Jojo, in Nigeria.

Adrian gets caught up in a relationship with Marigold Flowers, a strange woman with a passion for dollhouses. He is attracted to her at first, but he likes her less each day and she costs him a lot of money. He tries and fails to end the relationship. Adrian's debt accumulates to such an extent that he owes £200,000 at one point.

Eventually Adrian moves into his parents' converted pigsties, along with Marigold's sister Daisy, whom he marries. The couple settle down and have a daughter Gracie, but Adrian's problems are far from over. He suffers the double tragedy of losing his new wife to the local squire while discovering that he himself has cancer. His loyal friend and co-worker Bernard Hopkins comes to the rescue, moving in with him and promising to remain until his cancer is in remission. Fortunately Adrian's cancer treatment is successful and Bernard leaves to pursue romance with a local widow, giving Adrian a pig as a farewell present. The final book ends with Adrian finding out he will be a grandfather and Pandora arriving outside the house.

=== Family ===
The Mole family is dysfunctional. Adrian's parents Pauline and George Mole are working-class characters with limited social mobility who drink and smoke heavily. Both are often unemployed; they have separated, divorced and remarried several times, often in the wake of extramarital affairs. In a reversal of a typical teenager-mother relationship, Pauline berates Adrian for keeping his room "like a bloody shrine". They move from Leicester to Ashby-de-la-Zouch with their dog (only ever referred to as "the dog", who is eventually replaced by "the new dog"). Adrian's paternal grandmother Edna May Mole is also prominent in the early diaries until her death in The Wilderness Years.

Pauline first leaves George for their neighbour, Mr. Lucas, an insurance man. George fathers a second son, Brett, by a lover, Doreen Slater, whom Adrian privately refers to as "Stick Insect". Brett makes a reappearance in the later books as a successful yet unpleasant businessman who loses his fortune during the 2008 financial crisis. Doreen is killed off in Prostrate Years. Pauline temporarily marries her younger lodger Martin Muffet, who eventually leaves her for Adrian's girlfriend Bianca Dartington, giving Adrian and his mother a shared heartbreak. Later, George and Pauline effect a partner swap with Ivan and Tania Braithwaite (parents of Pandora), only to reunite after Ivan's untimely death.

Adrian's half-sister, Rosie Germaine Mole (after feminist Germaine Greer), grows up to be rebellious and street-smart, in contrast to Adrian. Despite opposing personalities, the siblings enjoy a close relationship, and Adrian often feels that she is the only family member who understands him. She also relies on him on occasion; when she becomes pregnant as a teenager, Adrian supports her decision to have an abortion.

Although the identity of Rosie's father is originally uncertain, in The Prostrate Years Mr Lucas, now wealthy, gets back in touch with Rosie and demands a DNA test on The Jeremy Kyle Show. Adrian tries to talk his mother and Rosie out of informing George or appearing on the show, but they do so; the test proves that Mr Lucas is Rosie's father. As Rosie's relationship with her parents breaks down, she moves in with Mr Lucas and starts calling him "Dad" and herself "Rosie Lucas". Pauline also raises the possibility of Adrian's real father being a poetry-writing maggot farmer she dated before she married George, but Adrian decides not to investigate. He thanks his father after learning that he raised him single-handedly during the first year of his life when Pauline was suffering from postpartum depression.

It is mentioned that Adrian's middle name, Albert, is after his paternal grandfather. However, in The Growing Pains of Adrian Mole, it is stated that his name was Arnold, and as Arthur in Weapons of Mass Destruction. However, he is simply called Grandad Mole. Adrian's maternal grandparents, the Sugdens, have never had their names revealed, although Pauline has two brothers, Dennis and Pete. Dennis married a woman called Marcia, and they had a son called Maurice, and Pete married a woman called Yvonne, who had died. Grandma Sugden had died twenty years previously, as of The Lost Diaries. Adrian's aunt, Susan Mole, appears in most – if not all – of the books. Susan is a lesbian and prison officer at Holloway Prison. In earlier books, she is dating a woman called Gloria, but later is married to another woman called Amanda.

=== Adrian's three children ===
- Glenn Bott-Mole, son of Sharon Bott, whom Adrian knew at school and had an affair with as a young man. Sharon represents the underclass of British society. Glenn moves in with his father and it is revealed the boy has a lot of respect for him when Adrian sees the cover of his diary. He eventually joins the army and at the end of the last book is expecting a baby with his fiancée, Finley-Rose.
- William Mole, the son of his first wife JoJo, a Nigerian princess. She divorces Adrian and moves back home. Eventually William joins her, changing his forename to Wole to make it sound more African.
- Grace Pauline "Gracie" Mole, the daughter of his second wife Daisy (née Flowers), a smart, successful PR career woman who resembles Nigella Lawson. Eventually she leaves him during his cancer episode for a thick aristocrat.

== Final volumes ==
Production of sequels was interrupted by Townsend's declining health. At the time Adrian Mole – The Weapons of Mass Destruction was published in 2004, Townsend stated it would be the last Adrian Mole volume. Two further volumes actually appeared: The Lost Diaries of Adrian Mole compiled material that had originally been published from 1999-2001, followed by a new Mole book entitled The Prostrate Years, which was released in 2009.

In October 2009 the Leicester Mercury featured an interview with Townsend where she discussed the new Mole book and her plans for future works. However, as ill-heath continued to be an issue, only two further very short works appeared. In 2011, Townsend published a short Adrian Mole piece that tied into the wedding of Prince William and Catherine Middleton. A very brief piece in which Adrian gave advice to writers followed in 2012. These would be the last Adrian Mole works published in Townsend's lifetime.

In a 2013 interview, Townsend discussed her intention to wrap up the series in two further volumes, but acknowledged her declining health might make this plan impossible. Townsend died on 10 April 2014. Her British publisher said the writer had been working on a new Adrian Mole story. The book, which had the working title Pandora's Box, was due for publication later in 2014. A spokesman for Michael Joseph said: "We can confirm that Sue was in the middle of writing the book. Her editor had seen what she describes as 'a few wonderful pages'. It was supposed to be out this autumn and we are very sad that we won't be able to show it to the world." This novel fragment remains unreleased.

== List of books featuring Adrian Mole ==
- The Secret Diary of Adrian Mole, Aged 13¾ (1982)
- The Growing Pains of Adrian Mole (1984)
- The True Confessions of Adrian Albert Mole (1989)
- Adrian Mole: The Wilderness Years (1993)
- Adrian Mole: The Cappuccino Years (1999)
- Adrian Mole and the Weapons of Mass Destruction (2004)
- The Lost Diaries of Adrian Mole, 1999–2001 (2008)
- Adrian Mole: The Prostrate Years (2009)

=== Compilations ===
- Adrian Mole: The Early Years includes the first two books.
- Adrian Mole From Minor to Major (i.e. from being a child to the years of the John Major government) collects the first three books and "Adrian Mole and the Small Amphibians".
- Adrian Mole: The Lost Years includes True Confessions and The Wilderness Years, and the bonus story "Adrian Mole and the Small Amphibians".
- Adrian Mole: The Later Years includes True Confessions, The Wilderness Years, and The Cappuccino Years.

== Other media ==
- The books had three television adaptations. The first, The Secret Diary of Adrian Mole, Aged 13¾, was made by Thames Television for the ITV network and broadcast between 16 September and 21 October 1985. The series featured a theme song "Profoundly in Love With Pandora" by Ian Dury and the Blockheads and starred Gian Sammarco as Adrian Mole with Julie Walters playing his mother and Lindsey Stagg as Pandora Braithwaite. The sequel, The Growing Pains of Adrian Mole was broadcast between 5 January and 9 February 1987 with Lulu replacing Julie Walters as Adrian's mother. Adrian Mole: The Cappuccino Years was broadcast on BBC One between 2 February and 9 March 2001, starring Stephen Mangan as Adrian Mole, Alison Steadman as Pauline Mole and Helen Baxendale as Pandora Braithwaite.
- The character also featured in several radio series, such as Pirate Radio Four in 1985.
- A stage adaptation was written by Sue Townsend in 1984 of the first book – The Secret Diary of Adrian Mole, Aged 13¾: The Play with music and lyrics by Ken Howard and Alan Blaikley. It starred Simon Schatzberger as Adrian Mole and Sheila Steafel as Pauline Mole. It was first performed at Phoenix Arts, Leicester and went to Wyndham's Theatre, London in December 1984.
- The first two books were adapted into computer adventure games by Level 9 Computing in the 1980s.
- A theatrical adaptation has been performed in many parts of the world, e.g. by the Roo Theatre in Australia.
- A less well-known chapter of Adrian's life was chronicled in a weekly column called Diary of a Provincial Man, which ran in The Guardian from December 1999 to November 2001. This material was published as The Lost Diaries of Adrian Mole, 1999-2001. Set contemporaneously, as all the diaries are, it fills in two of the gap years between Adrian Mole: The Cappuccino Years and Adrian Mole and the Weapons of Mass Destruction. Adrian spends this period living on a crime-ridden council estate with his sons, has an on-off romance with a woman named Pamela Pigg, and temporarily works in a lay-by trailer cafe. He befriends yet another pensioner who subsequently dies, and has a brief infatuation with his male therapist (which he insists is wholly spiritual, not homosexual). The series includes comment on the petrol crisis of 2000, the 9/11 attacks and the war on terrorism. Adrian's illegitimate half-brother Brett Mole, born on 5 August 1982, is reintroduced as a 19-year-old; he is an athletic, popular, confident, promiscuous, super-intelligent Oxford undergraduate, already a published poet and TV documentarian – in short, the person Adrian always wanted to be. Brett's mediocre older sibling soon comes to regard him with envious loathing. In what was apparently supposed to be a retrospectively-written preface to the re-published Diaries, Mole notes their re-publication in novel-form and suggests that Townsend is impersonating him and profiting from his writings. He also claims that his life is still not as happy as he would like, but 'that is another story' – suggesting that there is another diary to come. This series of diaries is not normally considered as canonical.
- To mark the royal wedding between Prince William and Catherine Middleton, Sue Townsend wrote an exclusive Adrian Mole story for the Observer in 2011.
- An obscure chapter of Adrian's life appeared in the Christmas 1994 edition of the Radio Times. Titled "Mole Cooks his Goose" it covered a stay by Adrian and Jojo at his mother's house over Christmas. It has never been republished.
- A new stage musical adaptation by Jake Brunger and Pippa Cleary opened at Leicester's Curve in March 2015. Townsend had been working with the writers on the project at the time of her death.

=== Cast ===
Character	The Secret Diary of Adrian Mole	The Growing Pains of Adrian Mole	Adrian Mole: The Cappuccino Years
Character	1985	1987	2001
Adrian Mole	Gian Sammarco	Gian Sammarco	Stephen Mangan
George Mole	Stephen Moore	Stephen Moore	Alun Armstrong
Pauline Mole	Julie Walters	Lulu	Alison Steadman
May 'Grandma' Mole	Beryl Reid	Beryl Reid	
Pandora Braithwaite	Lindsey Stagg	Lindsey Stagg	Helen Baxendale
Ivan Braithwaite	Robin Herford	Robin Herford	James Hazeldine
Tania Braithwaite	Louise Jameson	Louise Jameson	Zoë Wanamaker
Bert Baxter	Bill Fraser	Bill Fraser	
Queenie Baxter	Doris Hare	Doris Hare	
Nigel Partridge	Steven Mackintosh	Steven Mackintosh	Roderic Culver
Barry Kent	Chris Gascoyne	Chris Gascoyne	
William Mole			Harry Tones
Sharon Bott			Ruth Jones

Note: a dark grey cell indicates that the character was not in the production

== Parodies ==
Private Eye parodied the books with their The Secret Diary of John Major, age 47¾, in which Major was portrayed as naïve and childish, keeping lists of his enemies in a Rymans Notebook called his "Bastards Book", and featuring "my wife Norman" and "Mr Dr Mawhinney" as recurring characters. In addition, Adrian Plass's novel The Sacred Diary of Adrian Aged 37¾ and his autobiography The Growing Up Pains of Adrian Plass parody the titles of two of the Mole books.
