= Pandora Braithwaite =

Fictional character in the Adrian Mole book series

- Born: January 1967
- Education: Oxford University
- Occupation: Member of Parliament
- Spouses: Julian Twyselton-Fife (1984–85); Jack Cavendish (1985–97)
- Relatives: Ivan Braithwaite (father); Tania Braithwaite (mother)

Dr. Pandora Louise Elizabeth Braithwaite is a fictional character in the Adrian Mole series of books by Sue Townsend. Pandora is the love of Adrian's life; she is beautiful (Adrian especially loves her 'treacle-coloured' hair) and intelligent. In the first books, she and Adrian are happy together; however, in the later books, Pandora resists Adrian's advances in favour of physically and intellectually powerful men, although Adrian remains emotionally attached to her.

== Character ==
As a youth, Pandora is precocious and outspoken with firmly feminist and hard-left views. As she ages, she becomes successful but also manipulative and devious. Her portrayal throughout the novel could be likened to that of a champagne socialist. Pandora was a very important character in the series.

== Life ==
Pandora's parents were called Ivan and Tania. She came to Leicester at the age of 13 and sat with Adrian during geography classes; she soon became the most popular girl in their class. She started dating Nigel, but they soon broke up. She then started dating Craig Thomas, who Adrian was once friends with, but they also broke up. A few weeks later, on Wednesday 10 June 1981, Adrian and Pandora started dating; they had many short break-ups, until they finally ended their relationship in True Confessions.

She attended the University of Oxford, studying Mandarin, Russian and Croatian. She graduated and married her first husband, Julian Twyselton-Fife, who was openly gay; this was a "favour" carried out by Julian. They cemented their love at London's Astoria G-A-Y nightclub, after he drove for hours to pick her up. Her aversion to germs meant that she was unable to take a train. She had several liaisons and drifted apart from Adrian. Eventually she cohabited with Jack Cavendish, an old professor of Linguistics; after many years, they split up, with Jack revealing many of her secrets.

Later, she entered politics in the New Labour era under Tony Blair and became a Labour MP for Ashby-de-la-Zouch, in Leicestershire. She referred to herself as Pan National and The Shiniest Star in Blair's Sky, nicknames that the media picked up and subsequently used. However, she vocally opposed the Iraq War and was seen to be one of the Labour Party's most left-wing MPs. In the role, she is criticised for her expensive French wardrobe and shows little concern for her constituents, declaring that "democracy is wasted on them."

Her autobiography, Out Of The Box, sells poorly. An organised signing at Mr Carlton-Hayes' book shop orders 750 copies, almost all of which remain unsold, and the police escort decides his presence is unnecessary. The book's index has 112 entries under 'lovers' but only two references to Adrian.

=== Nicknames ===
- Box (in book 1)
- Pan (in private)
- The People's Pan (in media)
- Pan National (in media)
- The Shiniest Star in Blair's Sky(in media).

== Portrayals ==
- Lindsey Stagg in The Secret Diary of Adrian Mole, Aged 13¾ (1985–1987)
- Helen Baxendale in Adrian Mole: The Cappuccino Years (2001).

== See also ==
- List of Adrian Mole characters
