= Adrian Mole: The Prostrate Years =

2009 novel by Sue Townsend

- First edition cover
- Author: Sue Townsend
- Language: English
- Series: Adrian Mole
- Genre: Fiction
- Publisher: Michael Joseph
- Publication date: 5 November 2009
- Publication place: United Kingdom
- Media type: Print (hardcover)
- Pages: 416
- ISBN: 978-0-7181-5370-0
- Preceded by: The Lost Diaries of Adrian Mole, 1999-2001

Adrian Mole: The Prostrate Years is the last instalment in the Adrian Mole series of novels by Sue Townsend. It is set between 2007 and 2008 and was released on 5 November 2009. The Prostrate Years was the final book in the series published before Townsend's death in April 2014. She was partway through another book in the series (reportedly to be titled "Pandora's Box"), but this was never completed.

== The characters ==
=== Daisy Mole (née Flowers) ===
Daisy is now married to Adrian and is living with him in The Piggeries, to her constant misery. She and Adrian grow further apart during the course of the book, and she eventually leaves him following an affair with a wealthy local landowner, Hugo Fairfax-Lycett.

=== Gracie Mole ===
Gracie is Adrian and Daisy's young daughter. She enjoys dressing up in her favourite costumes in place of her school uniform and has become slightly obsessed with High School Musical. Throughout the course of the book, Adrian frequently feels that he has been emotionally neglectful of her, resulting in her lack of respect toward him. She is partially named after her paternal grandmother (her full name is Gracie Pauline Mole).

=== Pauline Mole ===
Pauline, Adrian's mother, is more central to this book's storyline and is a comforting female presence in the life of Daisy, Adrian's wife. During the course of the book, she is working on a highly exaggerated semi-autobiographical novel entitled A Girl Called "Shit" (a pun on the real-life novel A Child Called "It"). The early parts of the autobiography, read by Adrian, are melodramatic and sad - but Pauline soon adopts a brighter tone.

=== George Mole ===
Adrian's father. George is a full-time wheelchair user and still continuing his unhealthy lifestyle, despite having had a stroke before the book as a result of eating excessive pork scratchings. During the book, he discovers that he is not Rosie Mole's biological father whilst appearing with Pauline and Alan Lucas (Rosie's biological father) on The Jeremy Kyle Show. He is very fond of Gracie, Adrian's daughter.

=== Glenn Bott/Mole ===
Adrian's son Glenn is in Afghanistan's Helmand Province with the British Army, despite his admission that he does not understand what the conflict is about. He comes home only once during the book and begins a relationship with a girl named Finley-Rose, which leads to an engagement and Finley-Rose's pregnancy.

=== Nigel Hetherington ===
Nigel, Adrian's friend from his school-days, is still living in his granny flat and soon meets fellow gay blind man Lance Lovett, who comes to live with him. He is less than impressed with his new guide dog after his beloved dog Graham dies unexpectedly. Near the end of the book, Nigel marries Lance.

=== Mr Hugh Carlton-Hayes ===
Adrian's employer at the antiquarian bookshop, Mr Carlton-Hayes is still going strong despite previous evidence that he might retire and leave the shop to Adrian. He is occasionally absent from work due to ill-health and eventually spends a short stay in hospital with back trouble, where he becomes somewhat addicted to reality TV programmes. Towards the end of the book, Mr Carlton-Hayes is forced to close the bookshop due to lack of finances.

=== Brett Mole ===
Brett is the illegitimate son of George Mole and Doreen Slater. Initially a successful businessman, he visits Adrian's parents following Doreen's sudden death and is frequently arrogant and degrading towards Adrian and Bernard. He later loses his fortune and hangs around The Piggeries, usually drunk.

=== Bernard Hopkins ===
Bernard is a strange, eccentric and frequently drunk man who Adrian calls in to look after the bookshop due to both Mr Carlton-Hayes and his own frequent absences due to illness. Adrian notes that Bernard is an expert on antique books but isn't very pleasant to customers, to the point where he has been blacklisted from working at any Waterstones or Borders. He invites himself to Christmas dinner at Adrian's home and refuses to leave until Adrian has recovered from his prostate cancer, taking up permanent residence. Adrian and Bernard become close friends during Bernard's stay at The Piggeries, helping Adrian with household chores and a friendly ear. At the end of the book, he purchases a number of chickens and a pig (including suitable dwellings for the livestock) for Adrian as a 'thank-you' present.

=== Pandora Braithwaite ===
Pandora Braithwaite (BA, MA, D.Phil., MP) is Adrian's childhood sweetheart, and despite being opposed to the Iraq war and a vocal critic of Tony Blair, is still in a prominent position in government and knows Gordon Brown personally. Throughout the course of the book, Pandora frequently calls and visits Adrian after he is diagnosed with prostate cancer. There is a very slow and subtle reignition of her feelings for Adrian throughout the book and she admits several times that she loves him and thinks of him a lot. She unexpectedly arrives at Adrian's home on the final page of the book, as Adrian sits under the trees outside.
