= Adrian Mole: The Cappuccino Years =

1999 novel by Sue Townsend

- First edition
- Author: Sue Townsend
- Language: English
- Series: Adrian Mole
- Publisher: Michael Joseph
- Publication date: 14 October 1999
- Publication place: United Kingdom
- Preceded by: Adrian Mole: The Wilderness Years
- Followed by: The Lost Diaries of Adrian Mole, 1999–2001

Adrian Mole: The Cappuccino Years is the fifth book in the Adrian Mole series, written by Sue Townsend. The book was first published in 1999 by Michael Joseph. It is set from 30 April 1997 (the run up to Pandora's election as MP) until 2 May 1998. Adrian is 30 years of age. The book was made into a TV series that aired in 2001.

== Plot summary ==
Adrian is the Head Chef in a top Soho restaurant, and currently lives in the upstairs room of the restaurant; the rest of his family live in Ashby-de-la-Zouch. He is estranged from his wife Jo Jo, a Nigerian woman who has returned to her home country following their separation, and they are in the middle of a divorce. The real love of Adrian's life is, as ever, Pandora, who is now standing for Labour MP of Ashby-de-la-Zouch. Pandora's full name is revealed as Pandora Louise Elizabeth Braithwaite in the novel.

Adrian's father has no job, his mother is suspected of being involved with Pandora's father physically, his sister, Rosie, is a victim of culture – piercings, unprotected sex etc. and as a result gets pregnant and decides to have an abortion.

Adrian also has a son with Jo Jo, William, who is three and idolises Jeremy Clarkson. Pandora becomes a Labour MP, Adrian finally achieves a degree of media exposure when he is offered a job as a TV chef, and accepts when he hears the pay. Adrian does the TV shows, but gets upstaged by his co-host, Dev Singh. Adrian gets sacked from the restaurant, as it is being turned into an oxygen bar and then moves home to live with his family.

Pandora's father moves in with Adrian's mother, with whom he is having an affair, and Adrian's father moves in with Pandora's mother. Adrian's father and Pandora's mother then start an affair. Adrian is commissioned to write a book to go with the TV show, but fails, and is facing lifetime debt, but luckily, his mother writes it for him.

Adrian discovers he is father to another son, the disruptive Glenn Bott. Archie Tait, an old man with whom Adrian is acquainted, dies and leaves Adrian his house. Adrian, William and Glenn move in together. Adrian then employs a (mentally unstable) special needs teacher for Glenn, Eleanor Flood, who becomes infatuated with Adrian but holds no appeal for Adrian at all and ultimately sets fire to Archie's old house, after Pandora spends a night there. The uninsured house is completely destroyed, leaving him and his sons homeless. One of the few things recovered from the wreckage of the house is Glenn's diary, containing pages idolising Adrian.
