= If Winter Comes (disambiguation) =

If Winter Comes is a 1947 film directed by Victor Saville, based on the novel by A.S.M. Hutchinson

If Winter Comes may also refer to:

- If Winter Comes (novel), a 1921 novel by A.S.M. Hutchinson
- If Winter Comes, a 1922 play by A. S. M. Hutchinson and Basil Macdonald Hastings, adapted from the novel
- If Winter Comes (1923 film), a 1923 film directed by Harry Millarde, based on the novel by A.S.M. Hutchinson
- "If Winter Comes (Summer Will Come Again)", the music to the 1923 film; see If Winter Comes (novel)
