= If Winter Comes (novel) =

Novel by A. S. M. Hutchinson

- Title page for If Winter Comes (1921)
- Author: A. S. M. Hutchinson
- Language: English
- Publisher: Little, Brown and Company (United States), Hodder & Stoughton (United Kingdom)
- Publication date: 1921
- Publication place: United Kingdom
- Media type: Print (hardcover)

If Winter Comes is a novel by A. S. M. Hutchinson, first published in 1921. It deals with an unhappy marriage, eventual divorce, and an unwed mother who commits suicide. It was a bestseller on publication and was adapted into film in 1923 and 1947.

== Title ==
The title of the novel was taken from the last line of the Percy Bysshe Shelley poem "Ode to the West Wind": "If Winter comes, can Spring be far behind?".

== Plot summary ==
The story is the life of Mark Sabre, a middle-aged and upstanding man, but one who is much maligned. Sabre is presented as Christlike in terms of the unjustified persecution he faces. Sabre enlists during World War I, he is badly injured, and he returns to his loveless marriage to his shrewish wife Mabel. Sabre gets into trouble when he tries to help Effie, an unwed mother, who is assumed to be his mistress. He is divorced, loses his job, and scandal follows when Effie kills herself.

If Winter Comes presents sensational and controversial subjects of emotional adultery, unwed motherhood and suicide, but tempers them with moral, social and religious idealism.

The character of Rev Cyril Boom Bagshaw was a satire of the flamboyant Reverend Basil Bourchier.

== Publication history ==
If Winter Comes was published serially in Everybody's Magazine between December 1920 and July 1921. It was then published simultaneously by Little, Brown and Company in the United States and Hodder & Stoughton in the United Kingdom. After publication as a novel, it was serialized in Britain from August 1922 to March 1923 in Reynolds's Weekly Newspaper.

== Reception ==
If Winter Comes made the Publishers Weekly best seller list for 1922, and was the best-selling book in the United States for all of that year. A tie-in edition was published in 1947 at the time of the second film, and a paperback version was published in the 1960s, but it eventually lapsed into near-complete obscurity'.

George Orwell included In Winter Comes as one of the books with no literary pretensions but which remains readable in his 1945 essay "Good Bad Books".

== Adaptations ==
- The novel was adapted to a stage play by Hutchinson and Basil Macdonald Hastings. It opened at the Hippodrome in Margate in August 1922, went on tour, then started a West End run at the St James's Theatre in January 1923, running for 53 performances. It transferred to Broadway to the Gaiety Theatre, opening in April 1923 and starring Mabel Terry-Lewis and Cyril Maude. Simultaneously, there was a production in Sydney at the Theatre Royal by J.C. Williamson's New English Comedy Company.
- It was filmed in 1923 as If Winter Comes, directed by Harry Millarde and starring Percy Marmont and Ann Forrest. The film music was "If Winter Comes (Summer Will Come Again)" and was composed by H. M. Tennent and with lyrics by Reginald Arkell.
- It was filmed again in 1947 as If Winter Comes, directed by Victor Saville and starring Walter Pidgeon, Deborah Kerr and Angela Lansbury.

== Parodies ==
- The humourist Barry Pain made a parody of If Winter Comes in his 1922 If Winter Don't (United States) / If Summer Don't (United Kingdom).
- The comedian Billy Bennett made a parody of the song from the 1923 film in his 1927 poem "If Winter Comes".

== Literary and cultural references ==
- In A Question of Upbringing, the first novel in Anthony Powell's A Dance to the Music of Time, the narrator Nick Jenkins is holding a copy when Widmerpool says: ‘It doesn’t do to read too much,’ Widmerpool said. ‘You get to look at life with a false perspective. By all means have some familiarity with the standard authors. I should never raise any objection to that. But it is no good clogging your mind with a lot of trash from modern novels.’
- The library in Queen Mary's Dolls' House at Windsor Castle includes three volumes of extracts of If Winter Comes, presented by Hutchinson to Queen Mary in 1923.
- Donald Henderson's 1943 Mr Bowling Buys a Newspaper is a novel about a murderer who tries to get caught, in order to end the torment of his life. Like Mark Sable, Bowling is trapped in an unhappy marriage, and there is a pregnancy to a teenage mistress, but unlike Mark Sable, Bowling is an anti-hero for he is a murderer. The only book in Bowling's unhappy house is If Winter Comes.
- One of the novels that Sarah Waters read as background for her 2014 novel The Paying Guests was If Winter Comes.
- In Robertson Davies's 1970 novel Fifth Business, If Winter Comes is given to the small-town wife of an up-and-coming striver to ‘improve’ her. The novel's protagonist refers to the glowing praise given to the novel by Mackenzie King as “evidence of a sweet tooth, and nothing more.”
