= Beryl Reid =

British actress (1919–1996)

Beryl Reid OBE
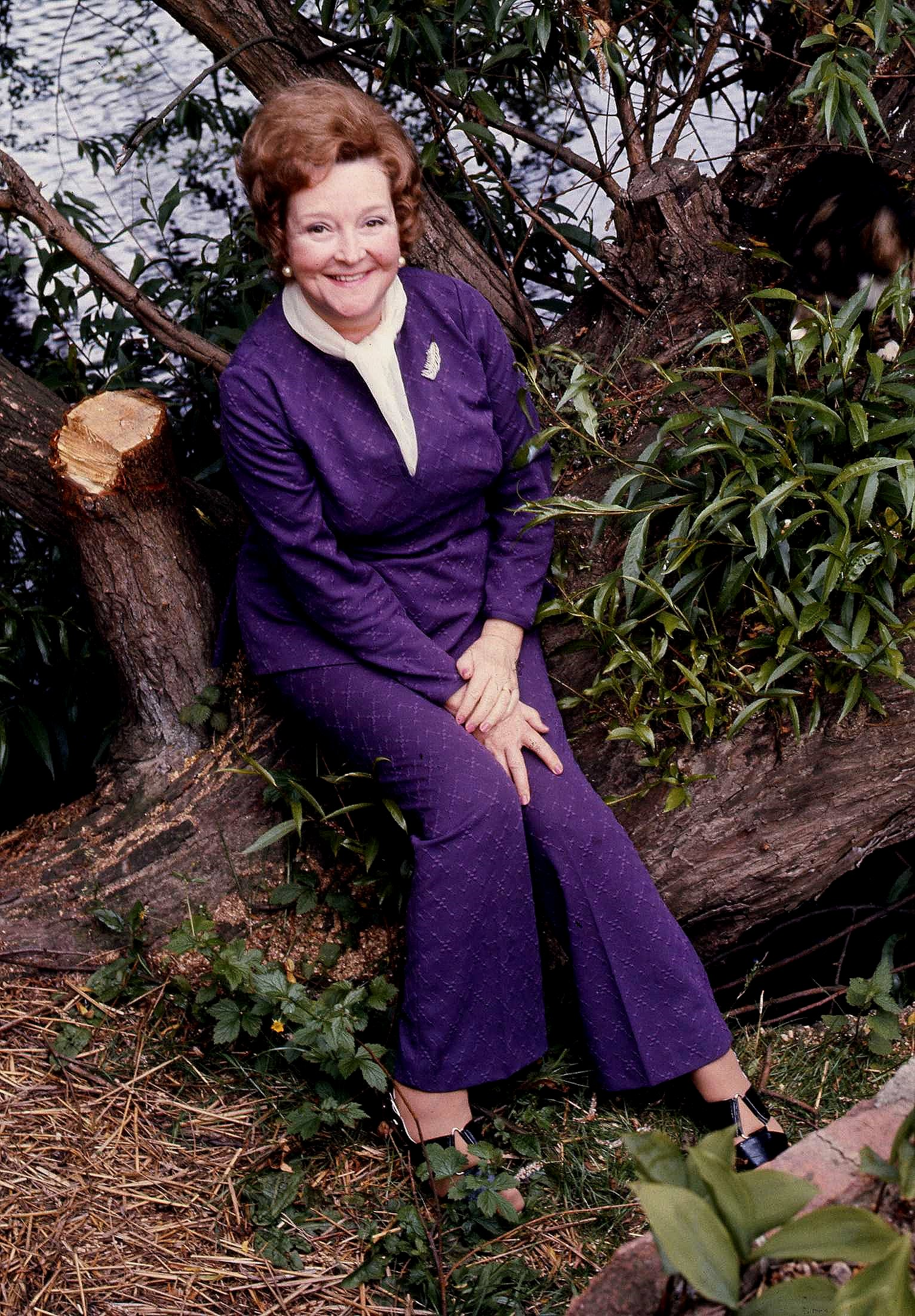
- Reid in 1974
- Born: 17 June 1919; Hereford, Herefordshire, England
- Died: 13 October 1996 (aged 77); Wexham, Buckinghamshire, England
- Occupation: Actress
- Years active: 1936–1994
- Spouses: Bill Worsley (m. 1949; div. 1953) Derek Franklin (m. 1954; div. 1966)

Beryl Elizabeth Reid (17 June 1919 – 13 October 1996) was a British actress. She won the 1967 Tony Award for Best Actress in a Play for The Killing of Sister George, the 1980 Olivier Award for Best Comedy Performance for Born in the Gardens, and the 1982 BAFTA TV Award for Best Actress for Smiley's People. Her film appearances included The Belles of St. Trinian's (1954), The Killing of Sister George (1968), The Assassination Bureau (1969), and No Sex Please, We're British (1973).

== Early life ==
Beryl Elizabeth Reid was born on 17 June 1919 in Hereford, Herefordshire, daughter of Leonard Reid, an estate agent and valuer, and Anne Burton, née McDonald. Reid was the daughter of Scottish parents and grew up in Manchester, where she attended Withington and Levenshulme High Schools. As a child, she established a lifelong friendship with Nancy Wrigley, the daughter of the prominent classical soprano, Dame Isobel Baillie. Years later, Reid fondly recalled how Baillie would "tell us the most wonderful things...you can imagine nine-year-old girls goggle-eyed at six princes serenading her in Hawaii!"

== Career ==
Leaving school at 16, she made her debut in 1936 as a music hall performer at the Floral Hall, Bridlington. Before and during the Second World War, she took part in variety shows and pantomimes. She had no formal training but later worked at the National Theatre and the Royal Shakespeare Company. Her first big success came in the BBC radio show Educating Archie as naughty schoolgirl Monica and later as the Brummie, "Marlene".

Her many film and television roles as a character actor were usually well received. She reprised her Tony Award-winning performance of a lesbian soap opera star in The Killing of Sister George for the 1968 screen version and was nominated for the Golden Globe Award for Best Motion Picture Actress in a Drama. The tour of the play was not a success; people in shops refused to serve her and other performers due to the gay characters in the play.

She was the subject of This Is Your Life in 1976 when she was surprised by Eamonn Andrews in the car park of Thames Television's Teddington Studios.

In both Tinker Tailor Soldier Spy (1979) and Smiley's People, (1982) Reid played Connie Sachs. She was nominated for a British Academy Television Award for Best Actress for both performances, winning for Smiley's People.

Between 1981 and 1983, Reid co-presented the Children's TV programme Get up and Go for Yorkshire Television, her co-presenter "Mooncat" being a green, talking, puppet cat. Stephen Boxer was her human co-star. After she left the show, it became titled simply Mooncat and Co.

In 1982, Reid appeared in Doctor Who in the Fifth Doctor serial Earthshock, as Captain Briggs.

Reid wrote an autobiography in 1984, So Much Love.

She played the part of an elderly feminist and political subversive in the 1987 television drama, The Beiderbecke Tapes.

She appeared in many situation comedies and variety programmes on TV including BBC TV's long running music hall show, The Good Old Days.

== Personal life and death ==
She married twice, but had no children. Her second husband, Derek Franklin, was a member of the Hedley Ward Trio. An authorised biography, Roll Out the Beryl, was published by Fantom Films on 22 August 2016. Written by Kaye Crawford, it was the first biography of the actress and coincided with the twentieth anniversary of her death.

From 1951 until not long before her death in 1996, Beryl Reid lived in a small African-styled rondavel house, Honeypot Cottage, built in 1933 as, originally, a holiday home, and overlooking the Thames at Wraysbury, west of London. She bequeathed the property to a friend, Paul Strike, an actor later regularly featured (in a voice-only role) in the BBC TV series, Casualty and who, as of 2021, still owned it.

In 1987, Reid and Honeypot Cottage featured in the comedy panel game show, Through the Keyhole, presented by David Frost and Loyd Grossman.

Reid died at the age of 77 from severe osteoarthritis and kidney failure (according to some obituaries, she had developed pneumonia) at a hospital in Wexham, Buckinghamshire on 13 October 1996, after complications following knee replacement surgery for arthritis.

== Filmography ==
Film
| Year | Title | Role | Notes |
|---|---|---|---|
| 1940 | Spare a Copper | Singer | Uncredited |
| 1954 | The Belles of St. Trinian's | Miss Wilson | |
| 1956 | The Extra Day | Beryl | |
| 1960 | Two-Way Stretch | Miss Pringle | |
| 1962 | The Dock Brief | Doris Fowle | |
| 1968 | Inspector Clouseau | Mrs. Weaver | |
| 1968 | Star | Rose | |
| 1968 | The Killing of Sister George | June Buckridge | |
| 1969 | The Assassination Bureau | Madame Otero | |
| 1970 | Entertaining Mr Sloane | Kath | |
| 1971 | The Beast in the Cellar | Ellie Ballantyne | |
| 1972 | Dr. Phibes Rises Again | Miss Ambrose | |
| 1973 | Psychomania | Mrs. Latham | |
| 1973 | Father, Dear Father | Mrs. Stoppard | |
| 1973 | No Sex Please, We're British | Bertha Hunter | |
| 1977 | Joseph Andrews | Mrs. Slipslop | |
| 1978 | Rosie Dixon – Night Nurse | Matron | |
| 1978 | Carry On Emmannuelle | Mrs. Valentine | |
| 1981 | Late Flowering Love | (unknown role) | Short (segment: "Invasion Exercise on the Poultry Farm") |
| 1983 | Yellowbeard | Lady Lambourn | |
| 1985 | The Doctor and the Devils | Mrs. Flynn | |

Television
| Year | Title | Role | Notes |
|---|---|---|---|
| 1950 | Showcase | (unknown role) | (unknown episodes) |
| 1951 | Vic's Grill | (unknown role) | 6 episodes |
| 1955 | The Benny Hill Show | Various roles | Series 1 (3 episodes) |
| 1957 | Mr Bowling Buys a Newspaper | Alice | TV film |
| 1957 | The Most Likely Girl | Arethusa Wilderspin | Series 1 (4 episodes) |
| 1960 | Someone Who Cares | (unknown role) | TV film |
| 1962 | The Dickie Henderson Show | (unknown role) | Episode: "The Visit" |
| 1963–64 | Bold as Brass | Bessie Briggs | Pilot & Series 1 (7 episodes) |
| 1964-1968 | Comedy Playhouse | Irene Jelliot/Mrs. Teresa Fanwyn | 2 episodes |
| 1965 | Who Is Mary Morison | Maggie | TV film |
| 1966 | The World of Wooster | Mrs. Wilberforce | Episode: "Jeeves and the Indian Summer of an Uncle" |
| 1966 | Frankie Howerd | (unknown role) | Series 2, episode 2 |
| 1966 | Love Story | Kate Reilly | Episode: "Duggie" |
| 1967 | Thirty-Minute Theatre | Miss Price | Episode: "The Other Side" |
| 1967 | The Bruce Forsyth Show | (unknown role) | Series 2, episode 6 |
| 1967 | Before the Fringe | (unknown role) | Series 2 (4 episodes) |
| 1967 | The Very Merry Widow | Mrs. Breasley | Episode: "Square Meals at Round Tables" |
| 1968-1971 | Armchair Theatre | Various | 3 episodes |
| | Beryl Reid Says Good Evening | Various roles | Series 1 (6 episodes) |
| 1969 | Wink to Me Only | Rene Jelliot | Series 1 (6 episodes) |
| 1970-1978 | BBC Play of the Month | Various | 4 episodes |
| 1970-1971 | Father, Dear Father | Mrs. Brockbank | 2 episodes |
| 1969 | Cinderella | Ugly Sister Marlene | TV film |
| 1971 | The Misfit | Mrs. Low Road Jones | Series 2, episode 2 |
| 1971 | The Goodies | Mrs. Desiree Carthorse | Series 2, episode 11 |
| 1972 | Alcock and Gander | Mrs Marigold Alcock | Series 1 (main role, 6 episodes) |
| 1972 | Late Night Theatre | Madame Thompson | Episode: "Trapped: Chez Madame Thompson" |
| 1973 | Smike! | Mrs. Squeers/Mrs. Steele | TV film |
| 1977 | Beryl Reid | (unknown role) | (unknown episodes) |
| 1978 | Two's Company | Mrs. Shelton | Episode: "The Pet" |
| 1979 | Dick Emery's Comedy Hour | Ada | Special |
| 1979 | Tinker Tailor Soldier Spy | Connie Sachs | Episode: "Smiley Tracks the Mole" |
| 1979 | An Honourable Retirement | Mrs. Heysham | TV film |
| 1980 | Peter Cook & Co. | Various | Special |
| 1980 | Nanny Knows Best | Nanny Price | TV pilot |
| 1980 | Rhubarb Rhubarb | Home Owner's Wife | Special |
| 1980 | Comedy Tonight | (unknown role) | Special (sketch "Laughing Gas") |
| 1981 | Agony | Cherry Lightfoot | Episode: "Arrivals and Departures" |
| 1981 | Worzel Gummidge | Sarah Pigswill | Episode: "Muvvers' Day" |
| 1982 | Doctor Who | Captain Briggs | Serial: "Earthshock" |
| 1982 | Smiley's People | Connie Sachs | Episode: "Gathering Friends" |
| 1982 | The Irish R.M. | Mrs Knox | Series 1 (2 episodes) |
| 1983 | Cuffy | Matron | Episode: "Cuffy and a Holiday" |
| 1983 | The Wind in the Willows | Mrs. Carrington-Moss (voice) | TV film |
| 1984 | The Wind in the Willows | Other Voices | Episode: "The Further Adventures of Toad" |
| 1984 | Minder | Ruby Hubbard | Episode: "The Second Time Around" |
| 1985 | Late Starter | Helen Magee | Series 1 (3 episodes) |
| 1985 | The Secret Diary of Adrian Mole, Aged 13¾ | May Mole | Series 1 (main role, 5 episodes) |
| 1985 | Bergerac | Miss Broome | Episode: "Low Profile" |
| 1987 | The Growing Pains of Adrian Mole | May Mole | Series 1 (main role, 6 episodes) |
| 1987 | The Beiderbecke Tapes | Sylvia | Miniseries (2 episodes) |
| 1988 | The Comic Strip Presents... | Mrs. Moss | Episode: "Didn't You Kill My Brother?" |
| 1988 | Sophia and Constance | Madame Foucault | Series 1, episode 4 |
| 1988 | Alexei Sayle's Stuff | Hettie | Episode: "Cartesian Dualism for the Fuller Figure" |
| 1990 | Boon | Pat Goran | Episode: "Thicker Than Water" |
| 1990 | The Ruth Rendell Mysteries | Mrs. Mountnessing | Episode: "Put on by Cunning" |
| 1991 | Duel of Hearts | Lady Augusta Warlingham | TV film |
| 1991 | Perfect Scoundrels | Aunt Molly | Episode: "My Fair Daisy" |
| 1992 | Bunch of Five | Gran | Series 1 (2 episodes) |
| 1993 | Cracker | Fitz's Mum | Serial: "To Say I Love You" |
| 1994 | Blue Heaven | Jeweller | Series 1, episode 4 (final role) |
