= If Winter Comes =

1947 film by Victor Saville

- Theatrical poster
- Directed by: Victor Saville
- Screenplay by: Arthur Wimperis; Marguerite Roberts
- Based on: If Winter Comes; 1921 novel by A.S.M. Hutchinson
- Produced by: Pandro S. Berman
- Starring: Walter Pidgeon; Deborah Kerr; Angela Lansbury; Janet Leigh
- Cinematography: George J. Folsey
- Edited by: Ferris Webster
- Music by: Herbert Stothart
- Production company: Metro-Goldwyn-Mayer
- Distributed by: Loew's Inc.
- Release date: December 31, 1947
- Running time: 97 minutes
- Country: United States
- Language: English
- Budget: $1.74 million
- Box office: $1.9 million

If Winter Comes is a 1947 American drama film directed by Victor Saville and starring Walter Pidgeon, Deborah Kerr and Angela Lansbury. Produced by Metro-Goldwyn-Mayer, it is based on the 1921 novel by A.S.M. Hutchinson. The film tells the story of an English textbook writer who takes in a pregnant girl. The novel had previously been made into the 1923 silent film If Winter Comes.

The title of the film was taken from the last line of the Percy Bysshe Shelley poem "Ode to the West Wind": "If Winter comes, can Spring be far behind?"

== Plot ==
Set in the English village Penny Green in 1939, the film focuses on Mark Sabre (Walter Pidgeon), an author and publisher who is unhappily married to Mabel (Angela Lansbury), a cold, humorless woman who usually spends her days gossiping with the townspeople. When Mark learns his former sweetheart Nona Tybar (Deborah Kerr) is returning to Penny Green, Mark, unlike his wife, is delighted. Nona is married to Tony Tybar (Hugh French), but she is still in love with Mark. Mabel is aware of Mark's feelings for Nona, and encourages him to spend time with her, thinking he will decide with whom he wants to spend his life.

As the war starts, Tony is called into the military; Mark attempts to enlist, but a doctor finds a heart condition and prevents him. Nona leaves Penny Green to join the Women's Auxiliary Air Force. Life becomes quiet for Mark until Effie Bright (Janet Leigh), who has been disowned by her father for becoming pregnant, turns to him for help.

Mark helps Effie and lets her live in his home while he looks for a better situation for her. This causes a great scandal, and the townspeople soon denounce Mark. He loses his job as a result of the morals clause at his place of employment. Mabel leaves Mark, believing that he has fathered Effie's baby, and serving Effie with the notice that she is co-respondent in the divorce. Effie, who was already under mental stress because the real father of the baby had not written her, commits suicide by poisoning herself. Meanwhile, Tony is killed overseas fighting in the war. At the inquest to determine Effie's cause of death, numerous witnesses give anecdotal evidence suggesting a sexual relationship between Mark and Effie. Nona appears, having just learned of Tony's death, and makes a short speech in support of Mark's character. The inquest determines that Effie's cause of death was suicide, and they censure Mark for his behavior.

Returning home, a distraught Mark finds a note addressed to him from Effie. In it, Effie names her lover: Harold Twyning, the son of Mark's former coworker. Mark furiously goes to confront young Twyning's father, but when he gets there, the man is grief-stricken, just having received the news that his son has also been killed in the war. Mark decides not to share the letter with him, but just as he is about to burn the letter, he collapses from a heart attack and passes out. Nona arrives and she and Twyning's father call for a doctor.

Weeks pass as Mark convalesces. As the staff listens in, doctors tell Nona that Mark will fully recover, but Mark continues to refuse to see Nona. Nona disregards the doctors and goes in to see Mark, who is still despondent. Nona professes her love for him, and reciprocates, telling her it won't be easy for them. She then shows him Effie's letter. Although Mark's solicitor wants to use the letter to exonerate Mark in the eyes of the townspeople, they burn Effie's letter together, and embrace.

== Cast ==
- Walter Pidgeon as Mark Sabre
- Deborah Kerr as Nona Tybar
- Angela Lansbury as Mabel Sabre
- Binnie Barnes as Natalie Bagshaw
- Janet Leigh as Effie Bright
- Dame May Whitty as Mrs. Perch
- Reginald Owen as Mr. Fortune
- Virginia Keiley as Rebecca 'High Jinks'
- Rene Ray as Sarah 'Low Jinks'
- Hugh French as Tony Tyber
- Hughie Green as Freddie Perch
- Rhys Williams as Effie's puritanical father
- Owen McGiveney as Uncle Fouraker
- Maila Nurmi as girl at the bar

== Production ==
Producer David O. Selznick bought the rights of the novel in 1939 and intended on casting either Joan Fontaine or Vivien Leigh in the female lead roles and Leslie Howard or Laurence Olivier in the male leads. Furthermore, John Cromwell was assigned as the film's director. Production was supposed to start on March 1, 1940, but Selznick eventually abandoned the project and sold the rights to Alexander Korda.

In 1943, Robert Donat was set to star, and the production, which was still under direction of Korda, was set to be filmed on location. Donat was supposed to reteam with Greer Garson, with whom he previously starred in Goodbye, Mr. Chips (1939). When Donat suddenly became unavailable, he was replaced by Walter Pidgeon in October 1943. Because the reteaming collapsed, Garson's part went to Deborah Kerr, whose participation was confirmed in April 1947. Direction eventually went to Victor Saville, who had no interest in the project, but agreed to direct it to work with Kerr.

Impressed by her performance in The Picture of Dorian Gray (1945), Saville assigned Angela Lansbury as Mabel Sabre. The casting of Janet Leigh followed in the summer of 1947. Her accent in the film was coached by the niece of C. Aubrey Smith.

Saville, determined on making films visually realistic, introduced "indirect lighting" in the film.

== Reception ==
The film made $1,115,000 in the U.S. and Canada and $834,000 in other markets, resulting in a loss of $465,000.
