= Michael Napier Brown =

British actor, theatre director, and playwright (1937–2016)

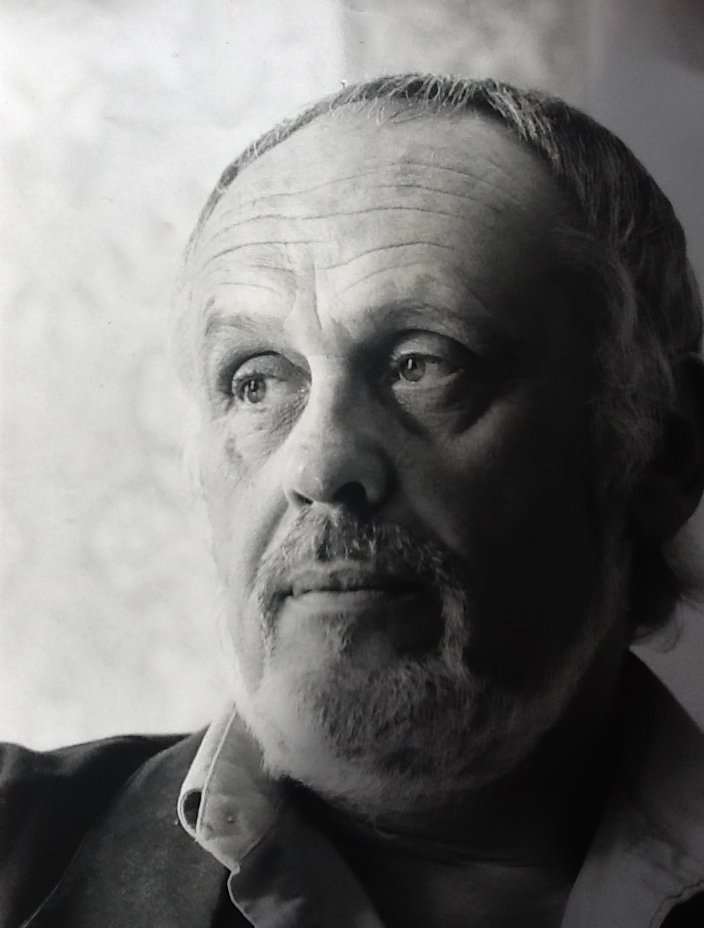
Michael Napier Brown

Michael Patrick Napier Brown (17 March 1937 – 18 August 2016) was a British actor, theatre director, and playwright who was the chief executive and artistic director of the Royal Theatre in Northampton for over 20 years.

== Early years ==
Born in Bournemouth, Napier Brown was the fifth and youngest child of Bessie and Arthur Napier Brown. He was educated at Bournemouth Grammar School for Boys where he developed a love for theatre and took part in various school productions. In 1953, he began a career in journalism with the Bournemouth Daily Echo while continuing to take part in amateur dramatics. From 1955 to 1957 he served his National Service with the Royal Air Force and on leaving the RAF he won a place at The Hampshire School of Drama, washing up in a Forte's restaurant in the mornings to pay for his drama lessons. In 1958, Napier Brown won 'Most Promising Actor', the prize for which was a small silver cup, an agent and a summer season in Guernsey.

== Acting career ==
He joined The Penguin Players in 1959, meeting his wife Vilma Hollingbery in the same year, and marrying her in 1961 at Eastbourne. From 1959 to 1964 the couple acted together in over 200 plays. It was during this period that he began directing for the first time.

Napier Brown's television appearances include Julius Caesar for the BBC (1963), Les Misérables (1967), The Golden Shot (1968), the Doctor Who story The War Games (1969), The Borderers (1970), Ivanhoe (1970), Doctor in the House (1970), The Troubleshooters (1970), Casanova '73 (1973), Doctor on the Go (1975), The Dick Emery Show (1976–79), Secret Army (1977), 1990 (1977), Happy Ever After (1978) and Terry and June (1980).

His theatre appearances include Mr Honeyman in Alibi for a Judge at the Savoy Theatre (1966–68); Athos in The Four Musketeers with Harry Secombe at the Theatre Royal, Drury Lane (1970); George Lyman in 1776 at the Albery Theatre (1971–74); Sheriff Vallon in Show Boat with Cleo Laine at the Adelphi Theatre (1975): Zorba with Alfred Marks at the Greenwich Theatre (1976), and Cardinal Wolsey in Kings and Clowns with Frank Finlay at the Phoenix Theatre (1978).

== Theatre director ==
Kings and Clowns was not a success, so Napier Brown decided to try theatre directing. He wrote to Malcolm Farquhar (with whom he and his wife had worked at Harare in Zimbabwe), artistic director at the Everyman Theatre in Cheltenham, who appointed him as associate director. Here Napier Brown directed 11 productions before moving to Derby Playhouse.

In 1981 Napier Brown became chief executive and artistic director of the Royal Theatre in Northampton. Here he discovered Gian Sammarco and Lindsey Stagg and cast them in productions at that theatre; he later recommended them to Thames Television when they were casting for The Secret Diary of Adrian Mole, Aged 13¾. After successful auditions they appeared as Adrian Mole and Pandora Braithwaite in two series.

Napier Brown remained at the Royal Theatre for over 20 years (where he directed over 130 productions) and wrote the plays Is This the Day? (1990), co-written with his wife Vilma Hollingbery and which won the Eileen Anderson Central TV award for Best New Play. He also wrote dramatisations based on Wuthering Heights (1994), An Old Man's Love (1996), Northanger Abbey (1998), The Turn of the Screw (1999) and Emma (2000). He directed 14 pantomimes, all of which had book, music and lyrics by his wife. In 1995 he was nominated as Best Director for the Martini Regional Awards for The Day After the Fair.

As the Royal Theatre was combining with the nearby Derngate concert hall to create the Royal & Derngate, Napier Brown relinquished his post and he and his wife returned to their home at Ham in Richmond in Surrey. He was director of the Ludlow Shakespeare Festival for three years, and also directed at the Orange Tree Theatre in Richmond and the Theatre Royal in Bath.

He directed several final year productions at the Arts Educational Schools and Mountview Academy of Theatre Arts in London, and was an examiner for the New Era Academy. He was a member of the audition panels for entry into Webber Douglas and Arts Educational schools.

In 1999 he was awarded an honorary Master of Arts degree by the University of Northampton for developing a thriving Theatre-in-Education programme at the Royal Theatre in Northampton.

== Personal life ==
Napier Brown was married to the actress Vilma Hollingbery from 1961 until his death. The couple had one daughter together who also became an actress.

He died on 18 August 2016, aged 79, at the Princess Alice Hospice in Esher following a long illness. Hollingbery died in 2021.

== Selected filmography ==
Year	Title	Role	Notes
1969	Doctor Who	Arturo Villar	Episode: The War Games
1970	The Borderers	Fergus	Episode: To the Gallows Tree
1970	Ivanhoe	Miller	Miniseries
1970	The Troubleshooters	Ralph Grant	Episode: The Price of a Bride
1977	Secret Army	Husband	Episode: Lisa - Codename Yvette
1980	Terry and June	Police Inspector	Episode: Uncle Terry, Auntie June
