= Jeff Dahlgren =

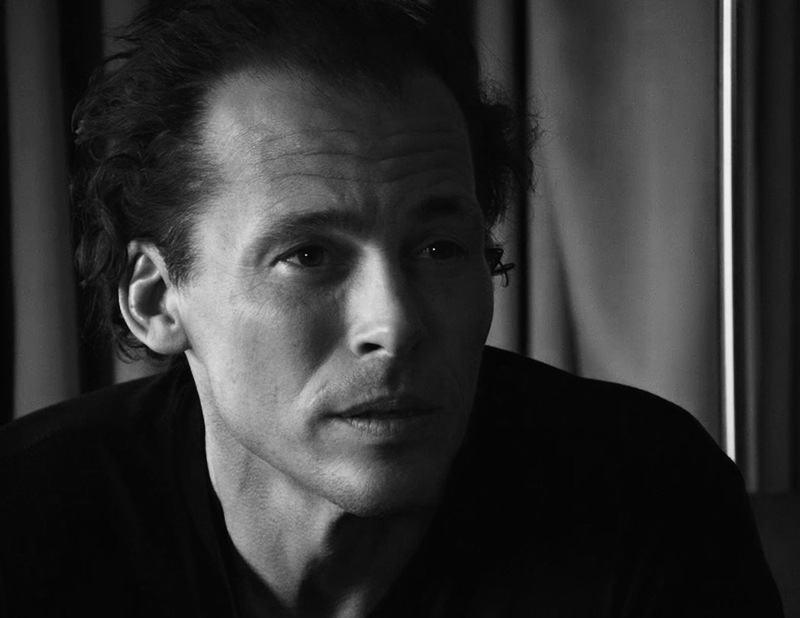

Background information
- Born: Los Angeles, California, US
- Occupations: American actor, music producer, musician, singer, songwriter, guitarist
- Instruments: Guitar, Vocals
- Years active: Present
- Labels: Formerly EMI Music Independent

Jeff Dahlgren is an American actor, singer, guitarist and music producer. Dahlgren's career includes singing in punk rock band Wasted Youth, star in the London-based film/mini-series Kosmos, and star of the French thriller film Giorgino. As a studio guitarist he has played on the highest-selling albums in French history and as lead guitarist performed on some of the largest-grossing tours in Europe. As a producer he has produced some twenty albums, gaining top 20 status in Germany, France and Italy, and has received two diamond albums.

== Movies ==
In 1994 Dahlgren was cast as lead actor and starred as Giorgino in the French film Giorgino, directed by Laurent Boutonnat. Giorgino's DVD went on to be one of the biggest sellers in Russia. In 2015, Dahlgren was cast as lead actor and starred as Philip Huyt in the London-based film Kosmos, a sci-fi thriller released as a five-part mini-series. Kosmos was written and directed by award-winning director Simon Horrocks of Third Contact.

== Music ==
=== Early career ===
From 1982 to 1985, Dahlgren was the singer in the punk rock band Wasted Youth. Dahlgren and Al Stiritz (the Wasted Youth drummer) met in Southern California, both having a love for alternative music, skating and surfing. They attended a Black Flag concert in Santa Monica California with Wasted Youth guitarist Chett Lehrer, and soon after Dahlgren was brought in as the frontman. Later, Dahlgren left the band for undisclosed reasons.

Mylène Farmer met Dahlgren in the early 1990s in Los Angeles, California. At the time of their meeting she was working on the single "Que mon cœur lâche". Immediately they began working together. Around the same time Dahlgren met producer and director of film "Giorgino", Laurent Boutonnat. Dahlgren and Farmer went on to record several albums together.

Farmer's fourth studio album marked the beginning of Dahlgren and Farmer's musical collaboration. Dahlgren had a great influence in the early composition of this album and was part of the Anamorphosée team involved in preparing it. The album Anamorphosée was released and launched by the single "XXL". The single became Farmer's first to debut at #1. Anamorphosée debuted at #2 in the album charts and sold half a million copies in 3 months. The album continued to sell well with the release of "L'Instant X", "California", "Comme j'ai mal", and "Rêver", which helped the album reach #1 in January 1997, 16 months after its release, gaining a Diamond certification.

Dahlgren embarked on Farmer's 1996 tour as lead guitarist, which was commercially successful. The corresponding live album, Live à Bercy, is currently the best-selling French live album ever. During the tour, Farmer sang a Raï version of Michel Polnareff's La Poupée qui fait non with Khaled, which was released as a promotional single from the live album and became a Top 10 hit in France. The band's lineup included Abe Laboriel, Jr., Brian Ray, Jerry Watts and Yvan Cassar.

Dahlgren returned to record guitar parts in spring 1999 with Farmer's fifth studio album Innamoramento. The lead single "L'Âme-stram-gram" was a futuristic up-tempo techno-ballad. Both the single and the album went straight to #2 on the charts.^{[16]} The album is certified Diamond in France. In late 1999, Farmer with Dahlgren embarked on the Mylenium Tour, named by Dahlgren which set the record of the highest-grossing tour by a non-English speaking artist.

=== Later career ===
In 2001 Dahlgren signed as a producer to EMI/Warner Music Group France and went on to produce Christia Mantzke. Her single "I'm Not a Boy" gained #100 for one week in France. Dahlgren also produced and directed the I'm Not a Boy video for Europe. Dahlgren and Farmer also signed a co-producing deal together with EMI.

From 2009 to 2014 Dahlgren was producer, guitarist and co-writer of the Texas band Katsuk. One music blog wrote about the band:

One of the best things about this band is their live performance. They create an atmosphere that envelops the listener like a wall of sound one does not want to escape from. They are powerful performance artists who weave smoky, woodsy vocals into elemental guitar melodies, harmonies, and percussion.

Katsuk's single "Cut The Cord" has been nominated along with the band for best album, live performance, and best song. In 2010 Dahlgren produced, co-wrote, and played on Katsuk's Zero Point album. He also produced Katsuk's second album Skeleton Key. Dahlgren also produced and mixed albums from the Denton, Texas based band Hatch.

As of 2015, Dahlgren was working on a new studio album - his first single, Ever Clear, was finished, but yet to be released. Farmer and Dahlgren produced two albums in the past which he did not release, citing interference with his European touring schedule. Dahlgren created and led the band Water, which went on to play at Whisky a Go Go, The Roxy, The Troubadour and The House of Blues on Sunset Boulevard between European tours. Band Members included Grammy Award-winning Mike Elizondo on bass, French drummer Mathieu Rabate, and Pete Straub.
