= The Growing Pains of Adrian Mole (TV series) =

1987 British TV comedy-drama series

- Genre: Comedy drama
- Written by: Sue Townsend; Trevor Waite; Oscar Webb
- Directed by: Peter Sasdy
- Starring: Gian Sammarco; Stephen Moore; Lulu
- Theme music composer: Ian Dury & Chaz Jankel
- Opening theme: Profoundly In Love With Pandora
- Country of origin: United Kingdom
- Original language: English
- No. of series: 1
- No. of episodes: 6

Production
- Producer: Peter Sasdy
- Running time: 50/26 minutes
- Production company: Thames Television

Original release
- Network: ITV
- Release: 5 January – 9 February 1987

Related
- The Secret Diary of Adrian Mole, Aged 13¾; Adrian Mole: The Cappuccino Years

The Growing Pains of Adrian Mole is a British television series based on the book of the same name written by Sue Townsend. It aired from 5 January to 9 February 1987 and starred Gian Sammarco, as the title character Adrian Mole, Stephen Moore as Adrian's father George Mole and Lulu as Adrian's mother Pauline Mole.

== Characters ==
=== Mole family ===
- Adrian Mole (Gian Sammarco) is the main character and narrator.
- George Mole (Stephen Moore) is Adrian's father and estranged to Pauline.
- Pauline Mole (Lulu) is Adrian's mother, who left her husband George in The Secret Diary of Adrian Mole to live with Mr. Lucas.
- May 'Grandma' Mole (Beryl Reid) is George Mole's mother and Adrian's grandmother.
- Rosie Mole is Adrian's baby sister.

=== Other characters ===
- Bert Baxter (Bill Fraser) is Adrian's foul-mouthed and strongly opinionated old age pensioner friend. He lives with Queenie in a bungalow, along with Bert's aggressive and unpredictable German Shepherd dog, Sabre.
- Queenie Baxter (Doris Hare) is Bert Baxter's wife, who later dies of a stroke.
- Pandora Braithwaite (Lindsey Stagg) is Adrian's girlfriend.
- Tania Braithwaite (Louise Jameson) is Pandora's liberal-minded mother.
- Ivan Braithwaite (Robin Herford) is Pandora's father.
- Nigel Partridge (Steven Mackintosh) is Adrian's best friend.
- Barry Kent (Chris Gascoyne) is a bully at Adrian's school who becomes friends with Adrian.
- Mr 'Creep' Lucas (Paul Greenwood) is the Moles' former neighbour with whom Pauline had an affair.
- Doreen 'Stick Insect' Slater (Su Elliot) is a woman with whom Adrian's father George has an affair while his wife is in Sheffield with Mr. Lucas.
- Maxwell 'House' Slater (Anthony Watson) is Stick Insect's badly-behaved young son from a previous relationship. Stick Insect also gives birth to a baby boy, Brett (George being the father) during the current series and they all live with George's mother for a time.
- Mr Reginald 'Popeye' Scruton (Freddie Jones) is Adrian and Pandora's abrasive and volatile headmaster, who is a huge admirer of the then-Prime Minister Margaret Thatcher.
- Ms Fossington-Gore (Mary Maddox) is Adrian, Pandora and Nigel's opinionated but supportive form tutor.
- Mrs Claricoates (Marian Diamond) is the school's kind-hearted and long-suffering secretary.
- Courtney Elliott (John Bird) is the Moles' friendly and slightly eccentric postman, who possesses a surprisingly impressive academic background.

There were one-off appearances from several other actors, including Tony Haygarth as Bernard Porke, the ill-mannered proprietor of the Rio Grande boarding house in Skegness, where the Moles stayed during a holiday; David Ryall as Mr Reginald Gudgeon, the well-meaning but inept manager of the local benefits office, Patrick Barlow as Mitchell Malone, the excitable local radio disc jockey and Lucy Benjamin as Sharon Bott.

== Episodes ==
No.	Title	Directed by	Written by	Original release date
1	"Falklands War"	Peter Sasdy	Patrick Barlow	5 January 1987
1982: the Falklands conflict rages. Bert's swapped medieval squalour for a new bungalow, both Doreen and Pauline have alarming news to George, and Adrian's mission to demystify the female form ends badly.
2	"Skating Rink"	Peter Sasdy	Patrick Barlow	12 January 1987
Adrian learns that 50p and a bag of grapes can't buy you love - but an aptitude for domestic chores just might. George has an unwelcome letter from the Inland Revenue, and it seems the Moles will be holidaying in Skegness... again
3	"Skegness"	Peter Sasdy	Patrick Barlow	19 January 1987
George leaves the family home, and Adrian and his mum face straitened circumstances. With her Giro cheque three weeks late, Pauline takes an extreme course of action...
4	"Mum Gives Birth"	Peter Sasdy	Patrick Barlow	26 January 1987
George leaves the family home, and Adrian and his mum face straitened circumstances. With her Giro cheque three weeks late, Pauline takes an extreme course or action...
5	"Reconciliation"	Peter Sasdy	Patrick Barlow	2 February 1987
The Mole family spends New Year's Eve together, with a morose Bert in attendance. Nigel can't decide whether to be heterosexual, bisexual or gay, while an attempted reconciliation between Pauline and George doomed to failure.
6	"Church in Hull"	Peter Sasdy	Patrick Barlow	9 February 1987
Having been suspended for a week Adrian's considered worth of Barry Kent's gang. Spending his evenings loitering outside a Chinese takeaway, he thinks he might be tasting real life at last; but is it a double life? And if he were to run away... would anyone notice?
