= If Winter Comes (1923 film) =

1923 film

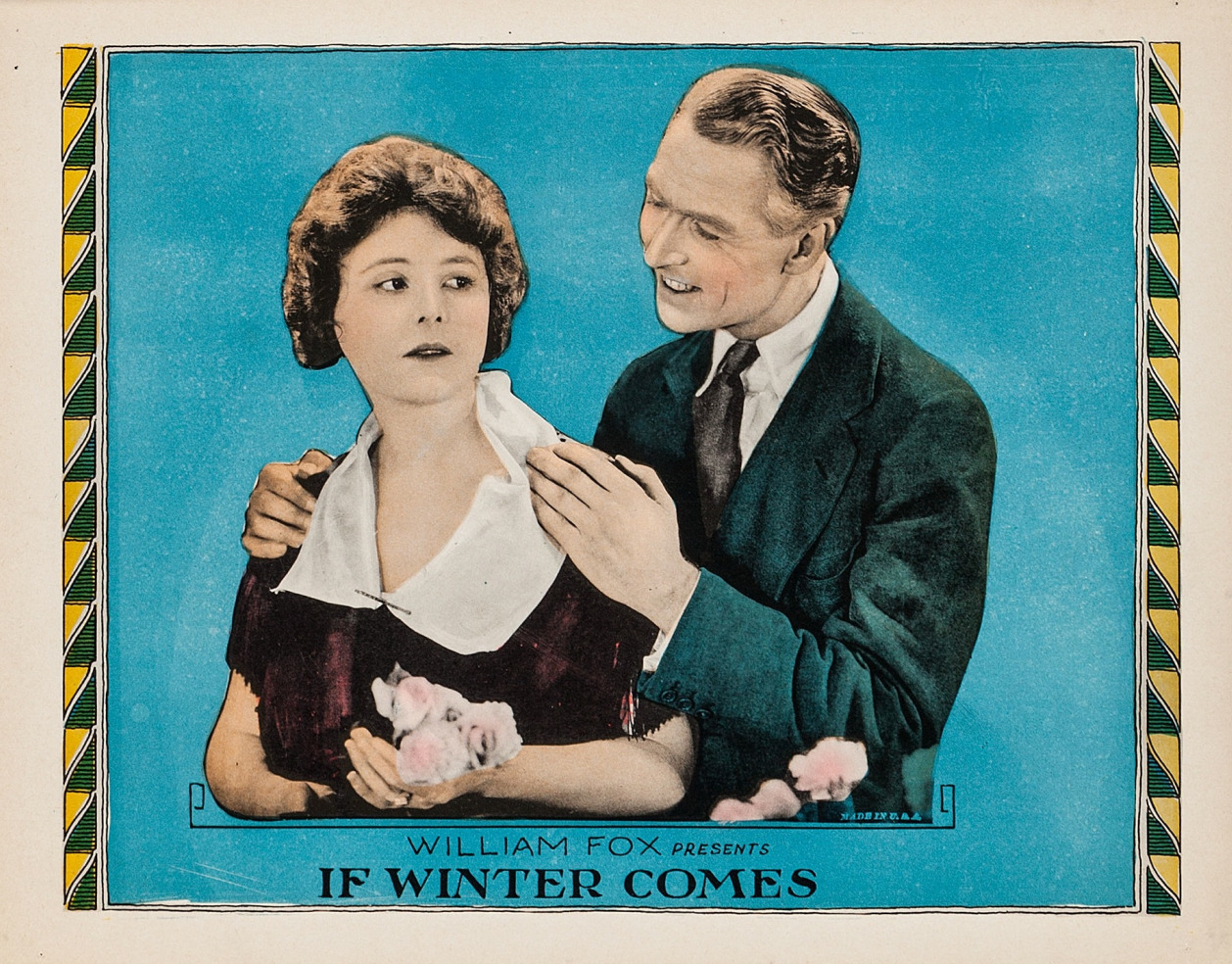
- Lobby card
- Directed by: Harry Millarde
- Written by: Paul Sloane (scenario)
- Based on: If Winter Comes; 1921 novel by A.S.M. Hutchinson
- Produced by: William Fox
- Starring: Percy Marmont
- Cinematography: Joseph Ruttenberg
- Distributed by: Fox Film Corporation
- Release date: March 7, 1923
- Running time: 120 minutes
- Country: United States
- Language: Silent (English intertitles)

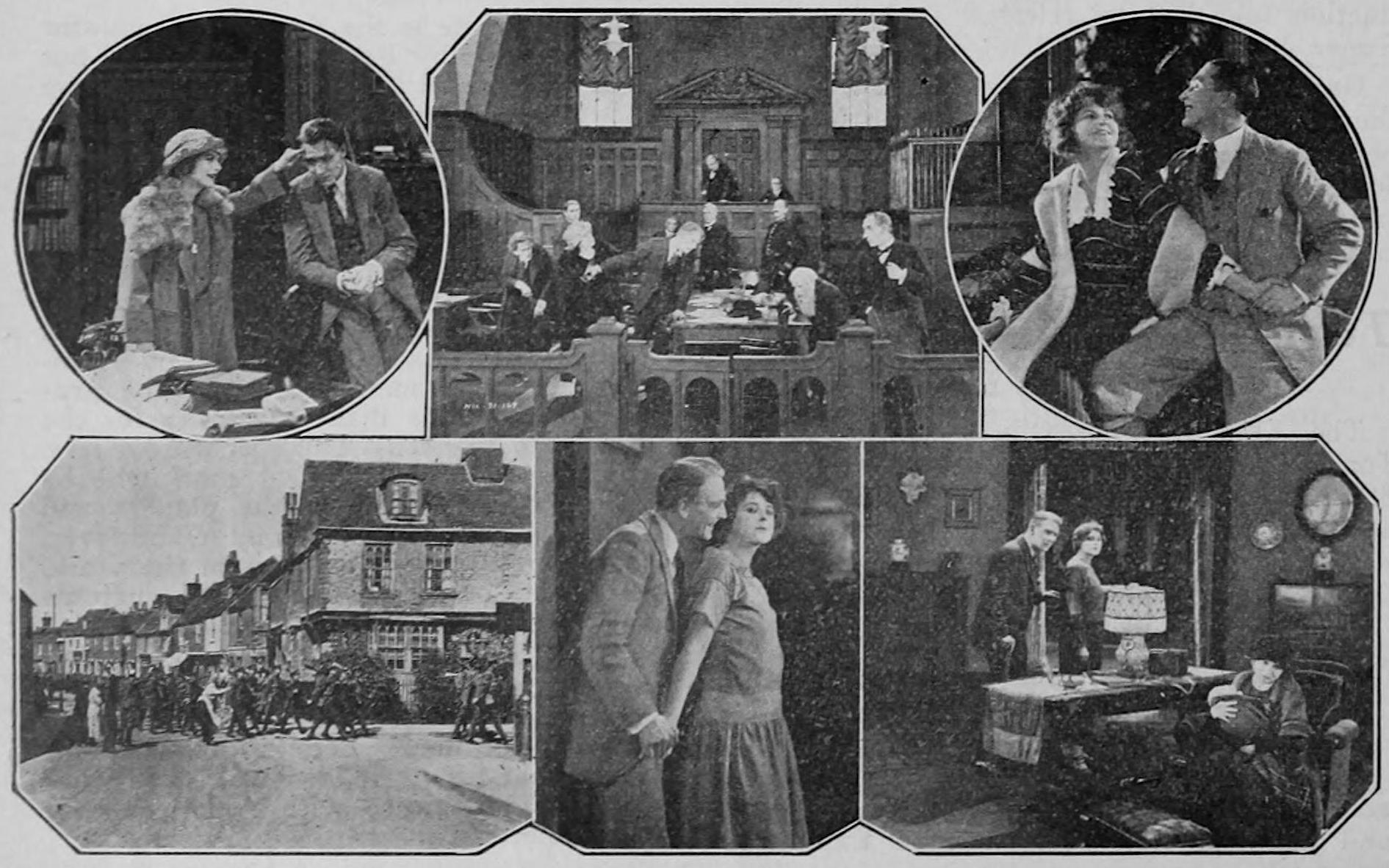
Several scenes from the film

If Winter Comes is a 1923 American silent drama film directed by Harry Millarde and starring, in a breakout role, Percy Marmont. It was produced and distributed the Fox Film Corporation. It is based on a 1921 novel later turned into a play by A. S. M. Hutchinson and Basil Macdonald Hastings.

The title of the film was taken from the last line of the Percy Bysshe Shelley poem "Ode to the West Wind": "If Winter comes, can Spring be far behind?"

If Winter Comes is a 1947 film version of the novel directed by Victor Saville.

== Cast ==
- Percy Marmont as Mark Sabre
- Arthur Metcalfe as Hapgood
- Sidney Herbert as Twyning
- Wallace Kolb as Harold Twyning
- Riley Hatch as Reverend Sebastian Fortune
- Raymond Bloomer as Lord Tybar
- Leslie King as Humpo
- George Pelzer as Old Bright
- Jim Tenbrooke as The Coroner
- Ann Forrest as Nona, Lady Tybar
- Margaret Fielding as Mabel
- Gladys Leslie as Effie Bright
- Dorothy Allen as High Jinks
- Eleanor Daniels as Low Jinks
- Virginia Lee as Miss Winifred
- Eugenie Woodward as Mrs. Perch
- Russell Sedgwick as Young Perch

== Preservation ==
With no prints of If Winter Comes located in any film archives, it is a lost film.

== See also ==
- If Winter Comes (1947)
- 1937 Fox vault fire
