= Lindsey Stagg =

British actress

Lindsey Anne Stagg (born 1970) is an English former child actress known for playing Pandora Braithwaite in the television dramatisations of The Secret Diary of Adrian Mole, Aged 13¾ (1985) and its sequel, The Growing Pains of Adrian Mole (1987). These were her only television appearances. The daughter of Barbara A. (née Leney) (born 1945) and Terence F. Stagg (born 1943), who married in 1966 at Rochford in Essex, she was discovered by Michael Napier Brown, the artistic director at the Royal Theatre in Northampton, where she was born (he also discovered her co-star in the series, Gian Sammarco). Napier Brown recommended her to Thames Television for the role of Pandora Braithwaite. She was one of 500 girls who were auditioned. Reportedly, Stagg did not enjoy acting and left the profession after completing Growing Pains in 1987.

Stagg married Michael P. Varley in 2000 at Bakewell in Derbyshire and with him has three sons; she is a National Childbirth Trust trained antenatal and postnatal doula supporting families in the Stockport and Manchester area.
