= Vilma Hollingbery =

British actress (1932–2021)

- Born: Vilma Jean Hollingbery; 21 July 1932; West Ham, Essex, England
- Died: 11 September 2021 (aged 89); Hillingdon, London, England
- Occupation: Actress
- Spouse: Michael Napier Brown (m. 1961; died 2016)
- Children: 1

Vilma Jean Napier Brown (21 July 1932 – 11 September 2021), known professionally as Vilma Hollingbery, was a British character actress. She appeared in various television programmes and films over a span of sixty years, and was known for her appearances as Claudia Wren in Psychoville, and also appeared in A Touch of Frost, the 1980 film Babylon, Doctor Who and The Bill, in which she appeared six times as different characters. She also portrayed Barbara in Motherland.

Hollingbery was married to the actor and director Michael Napier Brown, the couple had a daughter together, who also became an actress. Michael Napier Brown died in August 2016.

Hollingbery died in London, on 11 September 2021, at the age of 89.

== Filmography ==
Television
Year	Title	Role	Notes
1967	Champion House	Mim Royston	Episode: "Sonata for a Solo Fiddle"
1976	BBC2 Playhouse	Mrs Smith	Episode: "The Mind Beyond: Meriel, the Ghost Girl"
1977	Secret Army	Neighbour	Episode: "Growing Up"
1978	The Sweeney	Anne Monk	Episode: "Money, Money, Money"
1981	When the Boat Comes In	Mrs Dawson	Episode: "Oh, My Charming Billy Boy"
1988	The Management	Mrs Crusty	
1989	The River	Aunt Betty	
1989	The Bill	Hazel Davison	Episode: "Traffic"
1991	The Bill	Dorothy Strong	Episode: "832 Receiving"
1992	Maigret	Landlady	Episode: "Maigret and the Burglar's Wife"
1992	Waiting for God	Esme Sutherland	Episode: "Harvey's Fiancee"
1992	Sitting Pretty	Kitty	Unknown episodes
1995	London Bridge	Winnie Brown	
1995	A Touch of Frost	Jeanette Conrad	Episode: "Appropriate Adults"
2001	Gimme Gimme Gimme	Sister Brian May	Episode: "Lollipop Man"
2003	Grass	Rose	5 episodes
2003	The Bill	Louisa	Episode: #104
2004	Coupling	Mrs M	Episode: "The Naked Living Room"
2005	Doctor Who	Mrs Harcourt	Episode: "The Doctor Dances"
2005	The Bill	Mrs Coley	Episode: #320
2006	Doctors	Rose Connolly	Episode: "Dying Happy: Parts 1 & 2"
2007	The Bill	Lena Jones	Episode: "Killer on the Run"
2009–2011	Psychoville	Claudia Wren	Episodes: #6-#14
2011, 2014	Not Going Out	Betty	Episodes: "Fireworks" / "The Wedding"
2013–14	Derek	Elsie	
2013	Doc Martin	Mrs Eddy	Episode: "Nobody Likes Me"
2015	Inside No. 9	Caller	Episode: "Cold Comfort"
Film
Year	Film	Role	Notes
1980	Babylon	Lady in street	
1995	The Young Poisoner's Handbook	Aunty Panty	
