= Alexander Baron =

British novelist and screenwriter (1917–1999)

- Born: Joseph Alexander Bernstein; 4 December 1917; Maidenhead, Berkshire, England
- Died: 6 December 1999 (aged 82); Royal Free Hospital, Hampstead, London, England
- Citizenship: London
- Education: Hackney Downs School
- Occupations: Novelist, screenwriter
- Writing career
- Notable works: From the City from The Plough (1948), Rosie Hogarth (1951), The Human Kind (1953), The Lowlife (1963), King Dido (1969)

Alexander Baron (4 December 1917 – 6 December 1999) was a British author and screenwriter. He is best known for his novel about D-Day, From the City, from The Plough (1948), and his London novel The Lowlife (1963).

== Early life ==
Baron's father was Barnett Bernstein, a Polish-Jewish immigrant to Britain who settled in the East End of London in 1908 and later worked as a master furrier. Baron was born in Maidenhead, where his mother Fanny (née Levinson) had been evacuated during Zeppelin raids. The family soon returned to London, and Baron was raised in the Hackney district of London. He attended Hackney Downs School.

== Politics and wartime ==
During the 1930s, with his friend Ted Willis, Baron was a leading activist and organiser of the Labour League of Youth (at that time largely under the influence of the Communist Party of Great Britain). He helped establish what became the League's monthly paper, Advance. He campaigned against the fascists in the streets of the East End and edited the Young Communist League (UK) magazine Challenge. Baron became increasingly disillusioned with hard left politics as he spoke to International Brigade fighters returning from the Spanish Civil War. He was for a while a full-time Communist Party worker and according to his memoir Chapters of Accidents had been chosen to go underground in the event that the Party was proscribed during the Second World War, which it initially denounced as 'an imperialist war'. He finally broke with the communists shortly after the war.

Baron served in the Pioneer Corps of the British Army during World War II, and was among the first Allied troops to be landed in Sicily, Italy and on D-Day. Between 1943 and late 1944, he experienced fierce fighting in the Italian campaign, Normandy and in Northern France and Belgium. In 1945 he was transferred as an Instructor to a British Army training camp in Northern Ireland, where he received a serious head injury and was hospitalised for over six months.

== Writing career ==
After the war he became assistant editor of Tribune and was prominently involved with Unity Theatre. In 1948, he published his first novel From the City, From the Plough. At this time, at the behest of his publisher Jonathan Cape, he formally changed his name from Bernstein to Baron. Following the success of his first novel, Baron embarked on a career as a full-time writer. Baron's early novels drew on his own wartime experiences, his difficult postwar transition to civilian life, and his disillusionment with communism. Throughout his literary oeuvre, we find recurrent interest also in London life, politics, class, relations between men and women, and the relationship between the individual and society. In Baron's obituary, the novelist John Williams called him "the greatest British novelist of [the Second World War] and among the finest, most underrated, of the postwar period."

Baron wrote about Hackney and adjoining areas of London in the post-war period, notably in his 1963 novel The Lowlife. This reflects on the gradual disappearance of the Jewish East End of London and the impact of The Holocaust. Rosie Hogarth, 1951, was his first novel set in London and is a largely affectionate account of a working class community in the Chapel Market district of Islington. For further details on Baron's novels, and recent scholarship on his work, see below.

While he continued to write novels, in the 1950s Baron wrote screenplays for Hollywood, and by the 1960s he had become a regular writer on BBC's Play for Today. He wrote several episodes of the A Family at War series: 'The Breach in the Dyke' (1970), 'Brothers in War' (1970), 'A Lesson in War' (1970), 'Believed Killed' (1971), 'The Lost Ones' (1971), and 'Two Fathers' (1972). Later he became well known for drama serials like Poldark and A Horseman Riding By, and in the 1980s for BBC classic literary adaptions including Ivanhoe (1970), Sense and Sensibility (1981), The Hound of the Baskervilles (1982), Jane Eyre (1983), Goodbye, Mr Chips (1984), Oliver Twist (1985), and Vanity Fair (1987). He also wrote the script for the pilot episode, "A Scandal in Bohemia," of Granada Television's The Adventures of Sherlock Holmes (1984–1985).

In 1991, Baron was elected an Honorary Fellow of Queen Mary, University of London, in recognition of his contribution to the historical and social understanding of East London.

== Posthumous acclaim ==
Since Baron died in December 1999 many of his novels have been republished, testifying to a strong resurgence of interest in his work among the reading public as well as among critics and academics. These include Baron's first book, the war novel From the City, From the Plough (Black Spring Press, 2010; Imperial War Museum, 2019); his cult novel about the London underworld of the early 1960s, The Lowlife (Harvill, 2001; Black Spring Press, 2010; translated into Spanish as Jugador, La Bestia Equilátera, 2012; Faber & Faber, 2025), which was cited in Jon Savage's England’s Dreaming as a literary antecedent of punk; King Dido (Five Leaves, 2009, re-issued 2019), a story of the violent rise and fall of an East End London tough in Edwardian England; Rosie Hogarth (Five Leaves, 2010, re-issued 2019); and his second war novel There's No Home, the story of a love affair between a British soldier and Sicilian woman during a lull in the fierce fighting of the Italian campaign (Sort of Books, 2011; Chinese edition published by Hunan Art and Literature Publishing House, 2013). Baron's third work based on his wartime experiences, The Human Kind, was republished by Black Spring Press in Autumn 2011. His novel about a Jewish RAF officer's return to post-war London, With Hope Farewell (1952), was re-issued by Five Leaves in 2019, and his semi-autobiographical account of a young man's political coming of age, The In-Between Time (1971) is also scheduled for re-issue in the near future.

In 2019 Five Leaves published, for the first time, Baron's Spanish Civil War novel The War Baby, described by critic David Herman in a long review in the Times Literary Supplement as 'his best account, and one of the best accounts by any British writer, of disillusionment with the left.'

Later in 2019 the Imperial War Museum issued its own edition of From the City, From the Plough as one of its IWM Wartime Classics. In spring 2024, the IWM will publish There's No Home and The Human Kind in the same series. This fulfils Baron's desire, expressed in notes found posthumously, that his three war novels should one day appear together. He wrote: "The presence of history impregnates all my stories. They are connected by a web of cross-references. My three war books constitute a single body of work in which the broadening exploration of the theme can be seen." Elsewhere in his posthumous notes, he proposed an overall title for the sequence: 'Men, Women, and War'.

== Scholarship on Baron ==
Baron's personal papers are held in the archives at the University of Reading. His wartime letters and unpublished memoirs (Chapters of Accidents) were used by the historian Sean Longden for his book To the Victor the Spoils, a social history of the British Army between D-Day and VE Day. Baron has also been the subject of essays by Iain Sinclair and Ken Worpole.

In 2019 the first full-length study of Baron's life and work was published by Five Leaves: So We Live: the novels of Alexander Baron, edited by Susie Thomas, Andrew Whitehead and Ken Worpole. In addition to essays by the three editors, other essayists include novelist Anthony Cartwright, military historian Sean Longden, and historian Nadia Valman. The study also includes interviews with Baron as well as key articles by him on Jewishness and literature, together with archive photographs, and a walking guide to Stoke Newington highlighting key locations mentioned in his novels.

Baron's memoir Chapters of Accidents: A Writer's Memoir, which dwells particularly on his childhood, his membership of the Communist Party and his war service, appeared in 2022. It was published by Vallentine Mitchell and jointly edited by Colin Holmes and Baron's son, Nick Baron. It includes an introductory essay on Baron's life and work by Colin Holmes. In November 2023, the London Review of Books published a lengthy article written by Daniel Trilling that discusses Baron's writing and legacy, with a particular focus on The Lowlife.

== Works ==
Novels

- From the City, From the Plough (1948) a novel about the fictional 5th Battalion of the Wessex Regiment British Army. The novel takes place in the weeks leading up to D-Day and during the Normandy campaign. It was widely believed that the battalion was based on units of the 43rd Wessex Division and its attacks on Hill 112 and Mont Pinçon in Normandy. The novel was republished by Black Spring Press in 2010, and it was the top recommendation of Brian Sewell in the BBC Radio broadcast A Good Read, 28 February 2012, for its sympathetic and intimate description of army life in and out of combat. In 2019 the Imperial War Museum selected the novel as one of the first four titles in its new Wartime Classics series;
- There's No Home (1950) - On the interaction of wartime British soldiers with the people of Catania, Sicily, focusing on a doomed love affair. Two stanzas of Hamish Henderson's The 51st Highland Division's Farewell to Sicily serve as the motto. Republished by Sort Of Books in 2011. Chinese edition published by Hunan Art and Literature Publishing House, 2013. The Imperial War Museum, London, published the title in 2024 in its Wartime Classics series.
- Rosie Hogarth (1951), set in the Chapel Market district of Islington in central London. Republished by Five Leaves Press in 2010, and reissued in 2019.
- With Hope, Farewell (1952), set in London. Republished by Five Leaves Press in 2019.
- The Human Kind (1953). The third in Baron's 'War Trilogy'. This was a collection of short stories based upon the author's own wartime experiences. The book was later filmed as The Victors (1963), with the British characters changed into Americans to attract US audiences. Republished by Black Spring Press in 2009. The Imperial War Museum, London, published the title in 2024 in its Wartime Classics series.
- The Golden Princess (1954), about La Malinche.
- Queen of the East (1956), an historical novel about Zenobia, Queen of the short lived Palmyrene Empire, and her antagonist Aurelian, Emperor of Rome.
- Seeing Life (1958) a novel which touches on pop music, the mass media, homosexuality and the Communist Party of Great Britain.
- The Lowlife (1963), set in Hackney, is "a riotous, off-beat novel about gamblers, prostitutes and lay-abouts of London's East End". Republished by Harvill Press in 2001, Black Spring Press in 2010, and Faber & Faber in 2025. Discussions concerning a film adaptation of this novel are currently in progress.
- Strip Jack Naked (1966), sequel to The Lowlife.
- King Dido (1969), set in the East End in 1911. In autumn 2009 this was republished in New London Editions, an imprint of Five Leaves Press. Reissued by Five Leaves Press in 2019. Discussions concerning a film adaptation of this novel are currently in progress.
- The In-Between Time (1971). A largely autobiographical novel about Baron's youthful political activity. Scheduled for republication by Five Leaves Press.
- Gentle Folk (1976); adapted by Baron as a BBC television drama (1980).
- Franco Is Dying (1977), a political thriller set as Spanish fascism is drawing to an end.
- The War Baby (2019), a prequel to Franco is Dying set during the Spanish Civil War, unpublished in the author's lifetime, published by Five Leaves Press in 2019 for the first time.

Memoir

- Chapters of Accidents: A Writer's Memoir, edited by Colin Holmes and Nick Baron, with an Introduction by Colin Holmes (Vallentine Mitchell, 2022).

Film screenplays

- The Siege of Sidney Street
- The Siege of Pinchgut
- Robbery Under Arms (1957)

Story

- "The Man Who Knew Too Much"

Studies

- So We Live. the Novels of Alexander Baron, edited by Susie Thomas, Andrew Whitehead and Ken Worpole (Five Leaves Press, 2019), ISBN 978-1-910170-61-8
