= Hedley Ward =

British bandleader (born 1910)

- Sheet music for "Mona Lisa", featuring a portrait photo of Hedley Ward
- Born: Hedley John Ward; 6 February 1910; Kings Norton, England
- Died: 14 December 1969 (aged 59); Birmingham, England
- Occupations: Band leader; band manager
- Years active: 1930s–1960s
- Spouse: Beryl Margaret Ward
- Children: 2

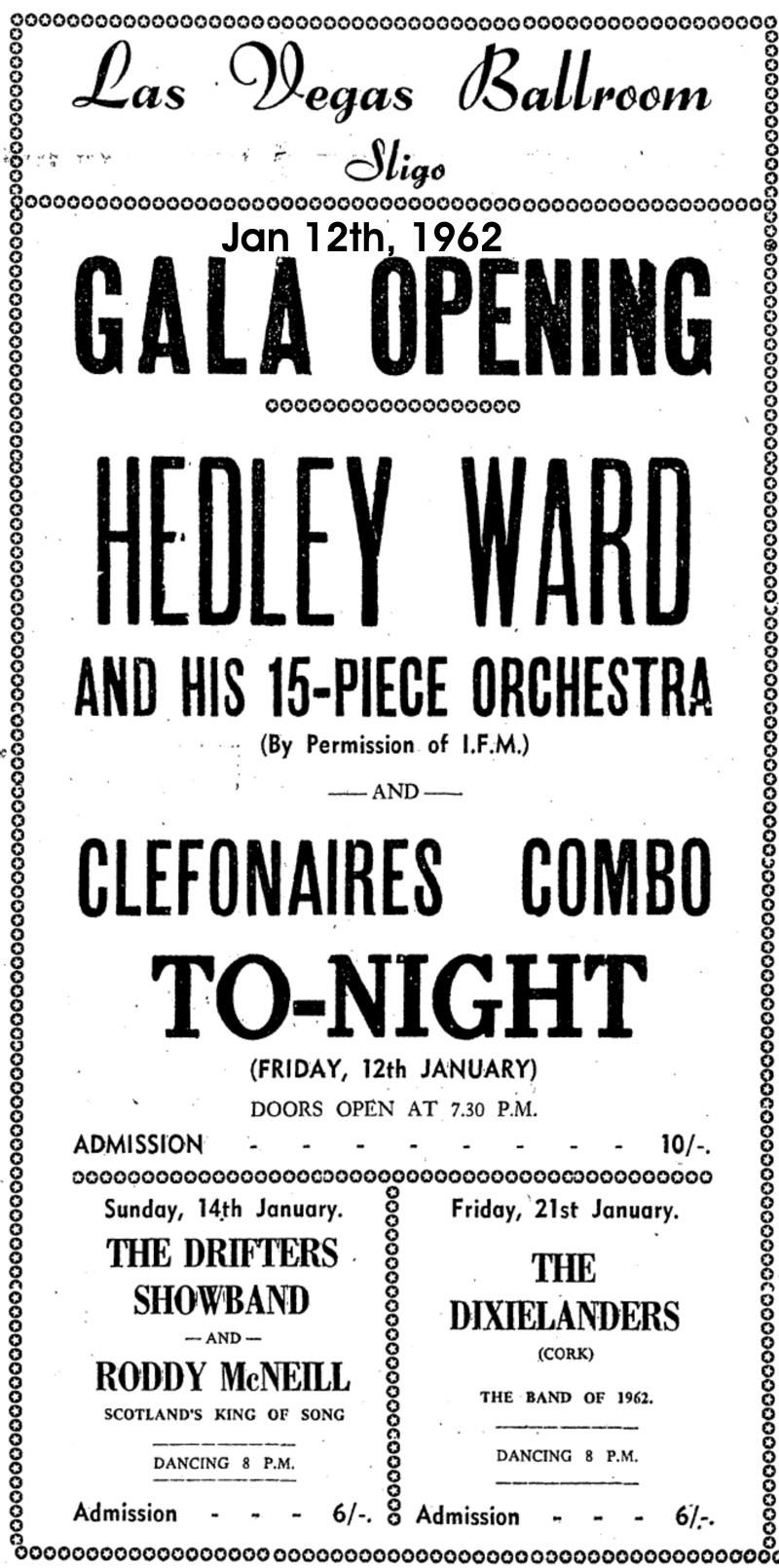
Press advert for the 12 January 1962 opening of the Las Vegas Ballroom, Sligo, featuring "Hedley Ward and his 15-piece orchestra"

Hedley John Ward (6 February 1910 – 14 December 1969) was a leading British bandleader of the 1930s to 1960s, known for his Birmingham-based Hedley Ward Band (sometimes "...Big Band", "...Dance Band", "...Broadcasting Band" or "...Orchestra"), which made many appearances on BBC Radio programmes, including Music While You Work, Shall We Dance?, and regional programmes named for the band.

Among the musicians to appear in the band were drummer Tony Levin.

Ward also created and managed the Hedley Ward Trio in 1948, featuring John "Jack" McKechnie (1918–2002) on guitar, Derek Franklin (second husband of Beryl Reid) on bass and lead vocals, and Bob Carter on piano. In 1953 George Taylor (1926/1927-2019) replaced Carter. Listings in The Radio Times show that the trio appeared on the BBC Home Service and Light Programme many times from 1948 onwards. They also featured in the programme Educating Archie, with Stella Tanner. The trio released records on the Melodisc Records label.

Hedley John Ward was born on 6 February 1910 in Kings Norton, now part of Birmingham. He played several seasons at The Spa Ballroom, Scarborough, North Yorkshire, in the late 1950s. Ward latterly lived in Kings Heath. He died in Birmingham on 14 December 1969, aged 59.
