= Simon Horrocks =

British film maker, writer and composer (born 1965)

- Born: 1965 (age 59–60); London, England
- Occupation(s): Film director, screenwriter, composer
- Years active: 1989–present

Simon Horrocks (born 1965) is a British film maker, writer and composer.

== Early life ==
Horrocks was born in London in 1965 to British parents, both artists, but spent the early part of his childhood living in a commune of artists and craftspeople near Glastonbury, set up by his father. At 13, he moved back to London with his mother and stepfather.

Until 1983, Horrocks attended Creighton Comprehensive School, a centrepiece of a Labour Party educational experiment. From 1983 to 84, he attended Middlesex Polytechnic where he made 2 short experimental 8mm films with Jonathan Glazer.

== Music ==
Frustrated by the academic tutoring of art, he left after 1 year and formed ambient house pop duo Aquarius with Sarah Jane Fogg. Their debut single Hey Babe was Melody Maker Single of the Week in January, 1993. From 1995 to 2006, the duo wrote over 200 pieces of music for music publisher CPM.

== Film ==
Horrocks’ debut feature film Third Contact was shot on an HV30 consumer camcorder for a total budget of £4000 and completed in 2012. Horrocks filmed virtually without a crew, operating the camera himself. A friend and girlfriend took turns recording sound over the year-long shoot. Horrocks completed editing, grading and sound design alone, co-writing the film's score with Sarah Fogg. After successfully raising £15,000 on kickstarter for theatrical distribution, the film received its global premiere at the BFI IMAX on 2 September 2013. When many of the film's online supporters came forward to help, Horrocks worked with them to run cinema on demand campaigns. Using indiegogo (where people wishing to attend would pledge for seats at the show), Horrocks took the film to cinemas in USA, Canada, Belgium, Switzerland and around the UK.

In 2014, using the same crowdfunding strategy they had used to bring Third Contact to Zürich, Horrocks assisted the creation of the Mobile Motion Film Festival which was founded by Andrea Holle, aiming to "create a festival which provides a level playing field for filmmakers, where talent, creativity and hard work counts more than budget and industry connections."

The same year, Horrocks embarked on his second major film project, Kosmos starring Jeff Dahlgren and Virginia Hey. Written as a 5-part free-to-view web series, the show was funded using kickstarter, raising £31,826 at the end of 2014. When a £3000 pledge dropped, leaving the production short of funds, Horrocks ran a 2nd campaign to cover the loss, reaching the target in only 94 minutes. Shooting took place over 3 weeks in February and March 2015. With no money left at the end, Horrocks took on all post-production tasks himself, teaching himself basic CGI knowledge to complete the film's SciFi effects. With the series left on a giant cliff-hanger, Horrocks decided to continue the story as a SciFi book called A Race Of Minds, which he wrote in 2016 and published via Amazon in early 2017.
