= Gian Sammarco =

British actor

- Born: Giancarlo Sammarco; 30 January 1970 (age 55); Northampton, England
- Occupation(s): Actor (former), nurse
- Children: 1

Giancarlo "Gian" Sammarco (born 30 January 1970) is an English nurse and former child actor. He is best known for playing the title role in the television dramatisations of The Secret Diary of Adrian Mole, Aged 13¾ (1985) and its sequel, The Growing Pains of Adrian Mole (1987).

== Early life and education ==
Born in Northampton, England, the son of Jacqueline and Pietro Salvatore Sammarco, Gian Sammarco is one of a large family of Italian descent. He attended Kingsthorpe Upper School (now Kingsthorpe College) in that town. The artistic director of the Royal Theatre in Northampton, Michael Napier Brown, selected Sammarco from 200 boys who auditioned to appear in his first theatre production, The Innocents.

== Career ==
He was among 100 boys auditioned by Thames Television for the role of Adrian Mole, having been suggested by Michael Napier Brown. Napier Brown also recommended another actor, Lindsey Stagg, also from Northampton, who won the role of Pandora Braithwaite. In 1987 he toured the UK in the play Widow's Weeds by Anthony Shaffer.

Apart from the two series of 'Adrian Mole', Sammarco's other television appearances included an interview on Des O'Connor Tonight (1985), co-presenting the first series of the children's Saturday morning show Get Fresh (1986), playing Whizzkid in the 1988 Doctor Who story The Greatest Show in the Galaxy, and the geeky trainspotter in the Press Gang episode "Something Terrible" (1990). His last acting role was in the 1990 children's Indiana Jones-style comedy series, Jackson Pace: The Great Years, alongside Keith Allen and Josie Lawrence.

== Personal life ==
In August 1990, Sammarco married Stephanie Bates at the Northampton Register Office. Bates was a fan of the Adrian Mole series and had written to him regularly until the relationship blossomed. Sammarco and Bates had a son, Jonathan, who was born 19 January 1992. Sammarco then gave up acting soon after the birth of his son and trained as a nurse. He is now a psychiatric nurse at the Berrywood Hospital in Northampton.

In 1998, he subsequently married Joanne Young, a nursing colleague, and continues to live in Northampton.

== Filmography ==
=== Television ===
Year	Title	Role	Notes
1985	The Secret Diary of Adrian Mole	Adrian Mole	6 episodes
1985, 1992	Screen Two	Jennings / Boy	2 episodes
1986	Crossroads	Jason Hathaway	Episode #1.4312
1986	Get Fresh	Himself	20 episodes
1987	The Growing Pains of Adrian Mole	Adrian Mole	6 episodes
1988	Doctor Who	Whizzkid	3 episodes
1989	The Two of Us	Wolfman	Episode: "The Party"
1990	Press Gang	Benjamin Drexil	Episode: "Something Terrible"
1990	Jackson Pace: The Great Years	Filo	5 episodes
