= Reagan's In =

Studio album by Wasted Youth
- Released: 1981
- Genre: Hardcore punk
- Label: ICI Productions
- Producer: Clem Fisher/Ian Hover

Wasted Youth chronology
Reagan's In (1981)	Get Out of My Yard! (1986)

Professional ratings
Review scores
Source	Rating
AllMusic	4/5 stars

Reagan's In is the 1981 debut album by the Los Angeles punk band Wasted Youth. The cover art was drawn by Pushead.

== Track listing ==
1. "Reagan's In" - 1:03
2. "Problem Child" - 2:07
3. "Teenage Nark" - 0:53
4. "Uni-High Beefrag" - 1:03
5. "Born Deprived" - 1:36
6. "Fuck Authority" - 1:41
7. "You're a Jerk" - 0:54
8. "We Were on Heroin" - 1:07
9. "Punk for a Day" - 1:37
10. "Flush the Bouncers" - 1:15

== Personnel ==
- Danny Spira - vocals
- Chett Lehrer - guitar
- Jeff Long - bass
- Allen Stiritz - drums

== Trivia ==
Pushead's original drawing for the record was of Charles Manson with the swastika on the forehead.

== See also ==
- Ronald Reagan in music
