= Giorgino =

- Film poster
- Directed by: Laurent Boutonnat
- Written by: Laurent Boutonnat; Gilles Laurent
- Produced by: Laurent Boutonnat
- Starring: Jeff Dahlgren; Mylène Farmer
- Cinematography: Jean-Pierre Sauvaire
- Edited by: Laurent Boutonnat; Agnès Mouchel
- Music by: Laurent Boutonnat
- Distributed by: AMLF
- Release date: 5 October 1994
- Running time: 177 minutes
- Language: English
- Budget: €12,000,000

Giorgino is a 1994 French thriller film directed by Laurent Boutonnat.

== Plot ==
It is October 1918 and the war-stricken Giorgio Volli (Jeff Dahlgren) returns to the orphanage where he had been working as a care-taker before the war. Upon arrival, he discovers the wife of the orphanage owner has committed suicide. His attempts to save her are fruitless. Soon after, it is revealed that the house is abandoned, and the children died under unclear circumstances. The only survivor is a girl, Catherine (Mylène Farmer). Giorgio follows the mystery to a small village bordered with a treacherous marsh where the locals are terrified of wolves. Through speaking with the secretive locals and the mystifying Catherine, Giorgino finds out that the orphanage owner, Doctor Degrâce, was involved in psychiatric experiments with children, which may have caused the abandonment of the orphanage. Doctor Degrâce's autistic daughter, Catherine, is the only witness to what unfolded in the orphanage, and Giorgino develops a tumultuous relationship with her as he begins to uncover the mystery of the small village.

== Cast ==
- Jeff Dahlgren : Giorgio Volli
- Mylène Farmer : Catherine Degrâce
- Jean-Pierre Aumont : Sébastien Degrâce, Catherine's father
- Joss Ackland : The priest Glaise
- Louise Fletcher : The innkeeper
- Frances Barber : Marie
- Albert Dupontel : Orderly, the crippled nurse
- Christopher Thompson, Christian Gazio : The young captain
- Su Elliot : Marthe
- Janine Duvitski : Josette
- Richard Claxton : Raoul
- John Abineri : Dr. Jodel
- Anne Lambton : Mother Raoul
- Valérie Kaplanová : The old woman
- Lillian Malkina: Mrs.Vennepeyn
- Jana Andresíková: Mme Forestier

== Production ==
The film was shot in 1993 in Prague and produced by Heathcliff and Polygram Filmed Entertainment.

It was distributed by French company Pathé for theatrical release.

== Reception ==
The film, produced by Laurent Boutonnat and in which Mylène Farmer starred, was both a critical and financial failure. Released on 5 October 1994, it was seen by barely 25,000 spectators in the first week and was the first setback in Farmer's career. As a result, the musical duo separated on bad terms before eventually getting back together for Farmer's 1995 album Anamorphosée.

== Soundtrack ==
Soundtrack (released on 3 December 2007)

Edition Super Jewel Box

1. "Ouverture" (3:52)
2. "Le Vent et la Neige" (1:14)
3. "La Route de Chanteloup" (1:05)
4. "L'Orphelinat"
5. "Les Montagnes noires" (2:11)
6. "En calèche" (2:19)
7. "À Catherine" (1:26)
8. "Giorgino theme" (3:37)
9. "Levée du corps" (0:46)
10. "L'Abbé Glaise" (1:45)
11. "Giorgio et les Enfants" (3:09)
12. "La Nursery" (3:09)
13. "Retour à l'orphelinat" (2:30)
14. "L'Armistice" (1:42)
15. "La Valse des baisers"
16. "Giorgio et Catherine" (3:49)
17. "Docteur Degrâce" (4:31)
18. "Morts pour la France" (2:28)
19. "Les Femmes dans l'église" (1:41)
20. "Les Funérailles" (2:37)
21. "Petit Georges" (1:21)
22. "Sombres Souvenirs" (2:34)
23. "Le Christ et les Cierges" (1:41)
24. "Menteur" (3:30)
25. "Le Marais" (1:50)
26. "Final" (7:43)
