= Ivanhoe (1970 TV series) =

- Genre: Adventure
- Based on: Ivanhoe by Walter Scott
- Written by: Alexander Baron
- Directed by: David Maloney
- Starring: Eric Flynn; Anthony Bate
- Country of origin: United Kingdom
- Original language: English
- No. of series: 1
- No. of episodes: 10

Production
- Producers: Campbell Logan; John McRae
- Running time: 25 minutes
- Production company: BBC

Original release
- Network: BBC One
- Release: 4 January – 8 March 1970

Ivanhoe is a BBC television series from 1970. The script was by Alexander Baron, based on Sir Walter Scott's 1819 novel Ivanhoe. The director was David Maloney.

It was shown on the Sunday tea-time slot on BBC1, which for several years showed fairly faithful adaptations of classic novels aimed at a family audience. It was later shown on US television. It consisted of ten 25-minute episodes. Eric Flynn, who played the title role, became better known for his work in stage musicals. Other cast members, such as John Franklyn-Robbins, Hugh Walters and Bernard Horsfall, were regulars in British TV classic dramas of the 1960s and 1970s.

The complete series was released on a Region 2 DVD two-disc set in September 2017 by Simply Media.

The opening uses the fanfare at the start of Symphony No. 4 (Tchaikovsky).

== Cast ==
- Eric Flynn as Ivanhoe
- Anthony Bate as Sir Brian de Bois Guilbert, the villain
- Vivian Brooks as Rebecca
- Clare Jenkins as Rowena
- Bernard Horsfall as King Richard
- Tim Preece as Prince John
- Clive Graham as Robin of Locksley
- Michael Napier Brown as Miller
