= Third Contact =

- Directed by: Simon Horrocks
- Screenplay by: Simon Horrocks
- Produced by: Simon Horrocks
- Cinematography: Simon Horrocks
- Edited by: Simon Horrocks
- Music by: Sarah Fogg; Simon Horrocks
- Release date: 25 October 2012 (Hof International Film Festival)
- Running time: 85 minutes
- Country: United Kingdom
- Language: English
- Budget: £4,000

Third Contact is a 2012 British psychological thriller film written and directed by Simon Horrocks. Shot on a camcorder for less than £4,000, combining elements of philosophy and science fiction, the film tells the story of a psychotherapist who becomes involved in a personal investigation into the mysterious suicides of two clients. The film received its world premiere at the Hof International Film Festival on 25 October 2012 in Hof.

== Plot ==
Psychotherapist Dr David Wright is in a session with depressed physicist Karl, who tells him about a thought experiment called Quantum Suicide. Karl then goads Dr Wright about another patient, Rene (who has recently taken his own life), provoking him into an angry outburst.

Rene's sister, Erika, arrives in London to sort out her brother's affairs. She discovers something curious - his apartment is almost empty: a cup, a spoon, a fork, a knife, frames without pictures, torn photos... One more curiosity: Four dated descriptions of moments in Rene's life.

Another patient dies, leaving another list of memories. There's something strange going on. Something sinister behind these 'suicides'... David Wright, who starts the film having lost faith in psychotherapy (seeing the quest for happiness as futile in a world of misery) is energised by the mystery behind the deaths of his patients.

David quizzes Erika for clues about her brother. In the following argument, David flushes her brother's ashes down the toilet in a rage. While she weeps, he discovers a number burnt into the bottom of her brother's ashes urn. Erika tells David her deceased brother wishes them to call the number. David says it is not a telephone number, so if he calls it and someone answers, then everything he knows about the universe is wrong.

At home, David calls the number. A woman answers and asks who gave him the number. On instinct, David tells her his patient Karl gave him the number and she gives him an address to meet First Contact. After bluffing his way into a meeting with First and Second Contact he awakes naked in his house, stripped of his belongings in the same fashion as his dead patients. Hearing Erika's farewell from his answering machine, his desperate bid to save her leads to another dead end and another dead body.

Seeming to confirm David's belief that all struggle is futile, and coming through his subsequent mental breakdown, he meets Karl and accepts his conditions for a meeting with Third Contact. Waking in a dark underground laboratory, he discovers he has been part of an experiment called 'Quantum Suicide' where memories become 'destinations' and your obsession with the past can lead you to a chance of happiness in a parallel world.

David finally meets the man behind the mysterious suicides - Third Contact - and is horrified to discover it is himself, but 30 years older. The experience is too much for his mind and he passes out again. When he wakes, he finds the mysterious women who answered his call tending to him. She explains how they use a bullet, inserted into the brain, to send someone who has had enough of this life to their chosen "destination" - which will be one of four specific listed memories. David takes out his list and reads. The woman declares that he is ready to go and injects him with an anesthetic, sending him to sleep.

He wakes in total darkness. Finds a torch and navigates his way back past a cellar full of belongings. He finds the underground lab again, but now all the equipment has been removed. All that remains is the 30 year old David Wright, with a hole drilled in his head, David's list of memories still clutched in his dead hand.

Back in time, David is in the garden with Theresa, in the moment when they were last happy, before she disappeared. As they hold each other tight, full of love, peering from the shadows of the kitchen window can just be seen - the old Dr. David Wright.

== Release ==
After successfully raising £15,000 on kickstarter.com for theatrical distribution, the film received its global premiere at the BFI IMAX on 2 September 2013.

== Reception ==
Critic Thomas Rothschild said, "It is no exaggeration to say it's quite the masterpiece and a sensational debut by Horrocks, director and cameraman." Ralph Sziegoleit wrote, "An inner journey is described in this difficult but fascinating film. One of the kind that quite often was the beginning of a great career." Katie-Jane Hall said it was difficult "to convey the sheer artistic brilliance and visual beauty that the work possesses".
