= The Secret Diary of Adrian Mole, Aged 13¾ (1985 TV series) =

Television series

- Grandma and Adrian Mole, played by Beryl Reid and Gian Sammarco
- Genre: Comedy drama
- Written by: Sue Townsend; Trevor Waite; Oscar Webb
- Directed by: Peter Sasdy
- Starring: Gian Sammarco; Julie Walters; Stephen Moore; Beryl Reid
- Theme music composer: Ian Dury & Chaz Jankel
- Opening theme: "Profoundly in Love with Pandora"
- Country of origin: United Kingdom
- Original language: English
- No. of series: 1
- No. of episodes: 6

Production
- Producer: Peter Sasdy
- Running time: 50/26 minutes
- Production company: Thames Television

Original release
- Network: ITV
- Release: 16 September – 21 October 1985

Related
- The Growing Pains of Adrian Mole; The Cappuccino Years

The Secret Diary of Adrian Mole, Aged 13¾ is a British television series directed by Peter Sasdy, based on the book of the same name written by Sue Townsend. It began in 1985 and starred Gian Sammarco as the title character Adrian Mole, Stephen Moore as Adrian's father George Mole and Julie Walters as Adrian's mother Pauline Mole.

== Characters ==
=== Mole family ===
- Adrian Mole (Gian Sammarco) is the main character of the series and also serves as narrator. His character on screen is shown wearing spectacles as well as wearing ties often when not at school, points not mentioned in the book.
- George Mole (Stephen Moore) is Adrian's father, married to Adrian's mother Pauline.
- Pauline Mole (Julie Walters) is Adrian's mother, who leaves her husband George to live with her neighbour Mr. Lucas in Sheffield. Walters was replaced by Lulu for series two.
- May "Grandma" Mole (Beryl Reid) is George Mole's mother and Adrian's grandmother.

=== Other characters ===
- Bert Baxter (Bill Fraser) is Adrian's foul-mouthed and strongly opinionated friend, an old age pensioner whom Adrian has to look after as part of a school club of which he is part. Bert owns an aggressive and unpredictable German Shepherd dog named Sabre, whom Adrian strongly dislikes.
- Queenie Baxter (Doris Hare) is Bert Baxter's partner, who later becomes his wife.
- Pandora Braithwaite (Lindsey Stagg) is Adrian's girlfriend.
- Tania Braithwaite (Louise Jameson) is Pandora's liberal-minded mother.
- Ivan Braithwaite (Robin Herford) is Pandora's father.
- Nigel Partridge (Steven Mackintosh) is Adrian's best friend.
- Barry Kent (Chris Gascoyne) is a bully at Adrian's school who beats Adrian up in exchange for money, until Adrian's grandmother puts a stop to it.
- Mr "Creep" Lucas (Paul Greenwood) is the Moles' former neighbour with whom Pauline has an affair in series 1.
- Doreen "Stick Insect" Slater (Su Elliot) is a woman with whom Adrian's father George has an affair while his wife is in Sheffield with Mr. Lucas.
- Maxwell "House" Slater (Anthony Watson) is Stick Insect's badly-behaved young son from a previous relationship.
- Dr Grey (Bill Wallis) is the family's jobsworth local doctor, whose bedside manner is generally rude and unsympathetic.
- Mr Reginald "Popeye" Scruton (Freddie Jones) is Adrian and Pandora's abrasive and volatile headmaster, who is a huge admirer of the then Prime Minister Margaret Thatcher.
- Ms Fossington-Gore (Mary Maddox) is Adrian, Pandora and Nigel's opinionated but supportive form tutor.
- Mrs Claricoates (Marian Diamond) is the school's kind-hearted and long-suffering secretary.
- Hamish Mancini (Craig Souza) is an American teenager whom Adrian befriends during his barge-holiday with his mother and 'Creep' Lucas.

In addition, Brenda Cowling appeared in two episodes as the formidable matron of the Alderman Cooper Sunshine Home, in which Bert and Queenie were residents before their marriage.

Some characters and places featured from the book are omitted in the TV series and parts of the diary entries mentioned with omitted characters are substituted by others (e.g. Rick Lemon is not featured but references to diary entries where he was featured have other characters fill in such as Ms Fossington-Gore. Another example is when Adrian goes to Scotland with his mother and Mr Lucas, this is changed to a river barge holiday in England).

== Episodes ==
No.	Title	Directed by	Written by	Original release date
1	"Pilot Episode"	Peter Sasdy	Trevor Waite & Oscar Webb	16 September 1985
The Mole family's neighbour Mr. Lucas is left by his wife, Mrs. Lucas. He and Adrian's mother Pauline have been having an affair, and they both leave to go to Sheffield, leaving Adrian and George, his father, on their own. Adrian meets old age pensioner Bert Baxter as part of the "Good Samaritan" project at his school. Bert's filthy house and habits disgust Adrian, but they become friends. School bully Barry Kent begins "demanding money with menaces" from Adrian, until Adrian's grandmother puts a stop to it by confronting Kent. Adrian takes a trip to Sheffield to see his mother and her lover, Mr. Lucas.
2	"Parents Separate"	Peter Sasdy	Trevor Waite & Oscar Webb	23 September 1985
Struggling to come to terms with his mother's departure, Adrian wears red socks to school, which sees him sent home by the headmaster, Mr. Scruton. His furious father complains to Mr. Scruton, and Adrian's love interest, Pandora Braithwaite, organises a "red sock protest" at the school, which brings her and Adrian together. Meanwhile, Adrian's friend Bert Baxter is taken to hospital with breathing difficulties.
3	"Charles and Diana's Wedding"	Peter Sasdy	Trevor Waite & Oscar Webb	30 September 1985
Adrian wakes up unable to talk and is diagnosed with tonsilitis. Meanwhile, an Asian family, the Singhs, move into the street, which prompts some racist comments by Adrian's father. Bert Baxter leaves hospital and moves in temporarily with Adrian and George. The street celebrates the wedding of Prince Charles and Lady Diana Spencer with a street party. Adrian's sweetheart Pandora goes on holiday to Tunisia, and Adrian runs up an expensive phone bill making calls to her.
4	"British Museum"	Peter Sasdy	Trevor Waite & Oscar Webb	7 October 1985
A school trip to the British Museum in London ends in disaster when the children go out of control and Barry Kent ends up arrested for theft. Adrian's phone calls to Pandora in Tunisia come back to haunt him when he receives the bill, which he hides from his father.
5	"Hospital"	Peter Sasdy	Trevor Waite & Oscar Webb	14 October 1985
Adrian is admitted to hospital to have his tonsils removed, which brings his mother Pauline back to Leicester to see him. After spending a couple of days with George and Adrian, Pauline eventually returns to live with them. Adrian burns the phone bill in a bonfire on Bonfire Night, but he is forced to confess all when the phone is cut off. His furious parents make him pay the bill using his savings. Bert Baxter is now in an old people's home, where he meets a woman named Queenie, to whom he becomes engaged.
6	"New Year's Eve"	Peter Sasdy	Trevor Waite & Oscar Webb	21 October 1985
Christmas Day arrives in the Mole house, and Adrian annoys his parents by inviting Bert and Queenie over for the day. He receives a racing bike as a present. Having been made redundant, Adrian's father George gets a job via the Manpower Services Commission as a canal bank supervisor. Adrian breaks Pandora's heart by having a brief liaison with a classmate, Barbara Boyer.

== Location ==
The series was mainly filmed on location in the Braunstone and South Wigston areas of Leicester. The Moles' house and street were actually filmed in Ludlow Close, South Harrow and Adrian's school scenes at "Neil Armstrong Comprehensive" were all filmed at Hammersmith School in West London (now Phoenix High). Whilst being set in Leicester, which is in the East Midlands, some of the characters speak with distinct West Midlands accents (e.g. Birmingham, Coventry, etc.).

== Music ==
The opening and closing theme was "Profoundly in Love with Pandora" by Ian Dury. It was released as a single in October 1985 and reached number 45 on the UK singles chart.
