= Donald Henderson (writer) =

English writer

Donald Landels Henderson (28 April 1905 – 18 April 1947) was an English writer.

== Early life ==
Henderson was born in 1905 in London. He had a twin sister, Alice Janet.

He was the only son of Donald Douglas Henderson (1873–1931), an engineer, and Alice (née Landels) (1876–1905). His mother died four days after his birth, and his father remarried Helen Mary Scott (1882–1959) when the twins were four. He had two younger half-sisters, Barbara and Pauline.

As a young man Henderson spent a period in a stockbrokers' office, and then became an actor. Later he joined the staff of the BBC.

== Career ==
From early youth Henderson had written novels and plays under various pseudonyms. He first used his own name on the 1943 psychological thriller Mr Bowling Buys a Newspaper, which got considerable critical attention in wartime Britain. In 1946, it was dramatised for the stage under the same title with a cast headed by Anthony Hawtrey and Jean Forbes-Robertson. In 1948, film actor Gene Raymond obtained the screen rights to it, according to the New York Daily News. In 1950, Anthony Hawtrey and Vida Hope starred in a teleplay of the novel on British television.

In the immediate aftermath of World War II Henderson published a second novel in the same genre, the 1946 Goodbye to Murder. Following the success of Mr Bowling, his book The Announcers (written under the pen-name D.H. Landels), was published by Collins Crime Club with the new title A Voice Like Velvet.

== Personal life ==
In 1932 Henderson married Janet Zoe Emilie Morrison, an actress, but the marriage soon failed. She did not remarry.

His second wife was Rosemary Bridgwater, whom he married in 1942. His wife gave birth to a son, Colin, in January 1945, but a second son, Angus, born in December the same year, only lived a few days.

Henderson's career was cut short when he developed lung cancer and died in Chelsea, London.

His second wife remarried, in 1948, to Stephen Boycott.
