= Su Elliot =

British actress

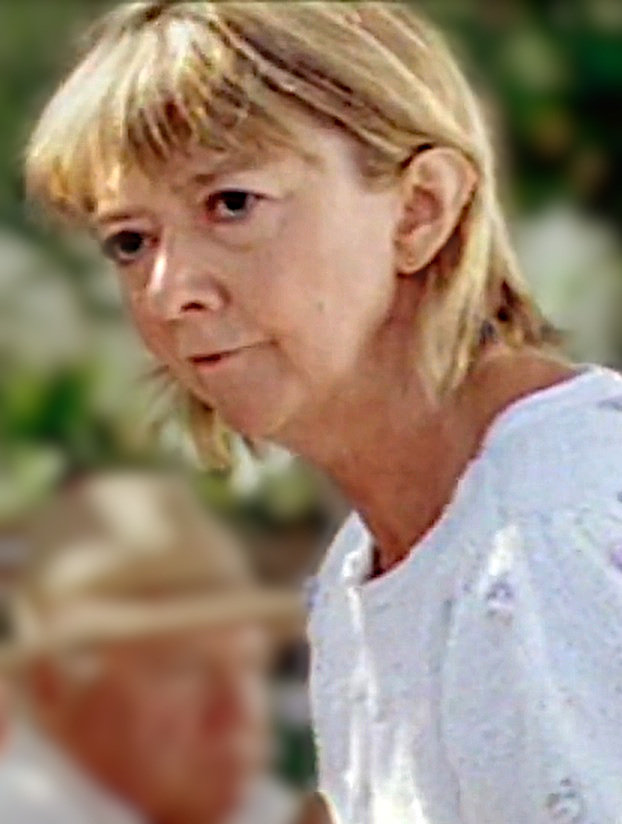
- Elliott in Carla 2003
- Born: 18 December 1950 (age 75); Newcastle upon Tyne, England

Su Elliot (born 18 December 1950) is a British actress.

She was born in Newcastle upon Tyne, Northumberland, England. Her film roles include Alice in The Zany Adventures of Robin Hood (1984), a nurse in The Girl in a Swing (1988), Marthe in Giorgino (1994), Mrs Brabin in Purely Belter (2000), a pub customer in The Hitchhiker's Guide to the Galaxy (2005), a Ministry of Magic witch in Harry Potter and the Goblet of Fire (2005), and Hannah in Jane Eyre (2011). Elliot has appeared in numerous British television productions, including The Secret Diary of Adrian Mole, Travelling Man, Hi-de-Hi!, Minder, The Bill, This Life, Auf Wiedersehen, Pet, Inspector Morse, Black Books, Coronation Street, King Leek and EastEnders.

She also appeared in Central Independent Television's Halloween special The Worst Witch as Agatha's assistant, Delilah.

== Filmography ==
Year	Title	Role	Notes
1984	The Zany Adventures of Robin Hood	Alice	TV movie
1986	The Worst Witch	Delilah	TV movie
1988	The Girl in a Swing	Nurse	
1994	Giorgino	Marthe	
1996	Secrets & Lies	Raunchy Woman	
2000	Purely Belter	Mrs. Brabin	
2005	The Hitchhiker's Guide to the Galaxy	Pub Customer	
2005	Chromophobia	Receptionist	
2005	Harry Potter and the Goblet of Fire	Ministry Witch #2	
2006	Starter for 10	Cleaning Lady	
2011	Jane Eyre	Hannah	
2013	Young, High and Dead	Mrs. Venner	
