= Mr Bowling Buys a Newspaper =

1943 psychological thriller by Donald Henderson

- First US edition cover
- Author: Donald Henderson
- Publisher: Random House
- Publication date: January 27, 1943

Mr Bowling Buys a Newspaper is a psychological thriller by Donald Henderson; it was the first novel Henderson published under his own name, and was first published in 1943.

== Plot summary ==
Mr Bowling is a serial killer, and often buys newspapers after a murder in order to see if the death has been reported. He kills, however, not for mere pleasure, but because he hates living, though due to his deep devotion to his faith, does not want to commit suicide. He does not make any attempts to hide his involvement in his crimes, as he wishes to be caught, and hanged, as well as gain some fame along with it.

Nevertheless, after his last killing, he meets Miss Mason, whom he recognises as a girl he knew in childhood. Whilst Bowling never met her, he dubbed her 'Angel' and held a candle to her for decades. Although he recognises she has become ugly as time has passed, he falls instantly in love with her, feelings she seems to return. Later, feeling guilty over potentially lying to Miss Mason about his actions if they start a relationship, he writes a letter to her, confessing to both his feelings and his crimes. When he is finally taken in for questioning by the police, he attempts to hide his guilt, his love for Miss Mason providing him with a new zest for life. When he is allowed to return home (with the detective remarking 'It is so hard to hang people nowadays'), he learns Miss Mason has provided the police with a false alibi, saving him. He visits the woman, who is the daughter of a vicar and is religiously devout herself, and bursts into tears, and she attempts to console him.

== Publication and reception ==
From early youth Henderson had written novels and plays under various pseudonyms but it was with Mr Bowling Buys a Newspaper that he first published under his own name. The novel received considerable critical attention in wartime Britain, but received mixed reactions. Raymond Chandler described it as his favourite novel. By contrast, one member of the public wrote to Henderson's publishers, Constable & Co, and described it as 'the last word in filth'.

Although adapted a number of times, after Henderson's early death in 1947, it eventually became forgotten, as did his other works. Although the film rights were sold, no film was ever made. For many years out of print, Mr Bowling Buys a Newspaper was republished by Collins Crime Club in 2019, with an introduction by Martin Edwards.

== Adaptations ==
- In 1946, it was dramatised for the stage under the same title with a cast headed by Anthony Hawtery and Jean Forbes-Robertson and had a short run at the Embassy Theatre in London: the play was set in just one of the locations from the novel, as 'a bloody boarding-house slaughter'.
- In 1948, film actor Gene Raymond obtained the screen rights to it, according to the New York Daily News.
- In 1950, Anthony Hawtrey (as Mr Bowling) and Vida Hope (as Alice) starred in teleplay of the novel on British television.
- A TV movie was made in 1957, produced and directed by Stephen Harrison, and featuring Hugh Sinclair as Mr Bowling and Beryl Reid as Alice.
