= Vic's Grill =

1951 British TV series

- Country of origin: United Kingdom

Original release
- Release: 1951

Vic's Grill is a British television programme which aired on the BBC during 1951. It starred Vic Wise. All the episodes are missing, and believed lost. The show was broadcast live. Though the technology to record live television was developed in late 1947, it was very rarely used by the BBC until around 1953, as it was considered of unacceptable quality.
