= A. S. M. Hutchinson =

British novelist (1879–1971)

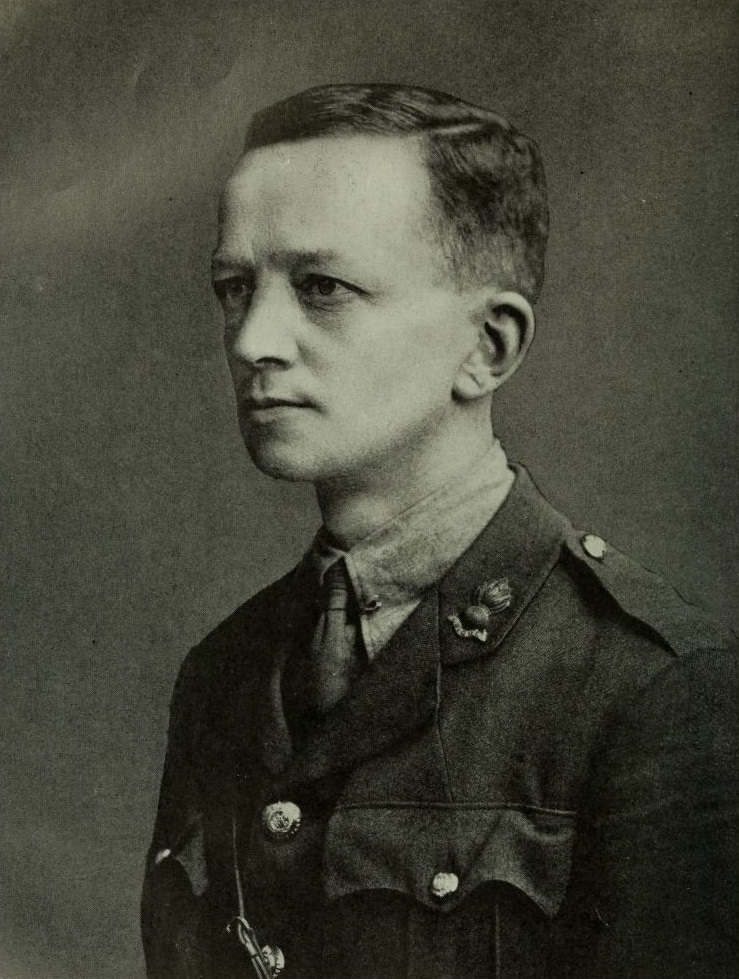
- Born: Arthur Stuart-Menteth Hutchinson; 2 June 1879; India
- Died: 14 March 1971 (aged 91); Uckfield, Sussex, England
- Occupation: Novelist

Arthur Stuart-Menteth Hutchinson (2 June 1879 – 14 March 1971), commonly known by his initials A. S. M. Hutchinson, was a British novelist.

== Early career ==
Hutchinson was born on 2 June 1879 in India. His father was a distinguished soldier and his mother was a member of the Stuart Menteths, a noble Scottish family. His sister, Vere Stuart-Menteth Hutchinson, was also a novelist.

He began his career as a medical student at St Thomas' Hospital in London, but turned to writing when some of his short stories were accepted for publication by Punch and Pearson's Magazine. He joined the staff as a writer at Pearson's, which led to work at The Daily Graphic newspaper. He became sub-editor at the Graphic in 1907, and edited it from 1912 to 1916.

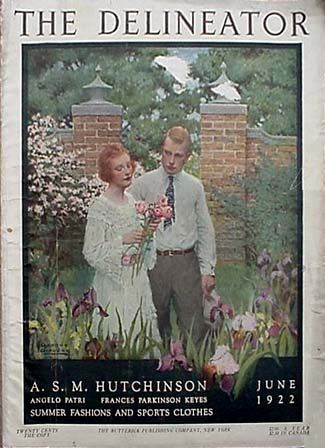
A Hutchinson work was featured in The Delineator for June 1922

Hutchinson wrote romance and family novels as well as short stories for publications such The Sphere Magazine. His first two books, the comedy Once Aboard the Lugger (1908) and the romance The Happy Warrior (1912), achieved moderate success. But the third, the more tragic The Clean Heart (1914), was overshadowed by the outbreak of war. Hutchinson served as a lieutenant of the Royal Engineers attached to the Canadian forces, and continued to serve after the war as a Captain with the Army of Occupation in Germany. Once a civilian again he decided not to return to journalism but to become a full-time author.

== Best seller ==
His best-selling novel, If Winter Comes, was in many aspects ahead of its time, dealing with an unhappy marriage, eventual divorce, and an unwed mother who commits suicide. According to The New York Times, If Winter Comes was the best-selling book in the United States for all of 1922. The book was so popular that clergymen gave sermons on the plight of the novel's hero, Mark Sabre. The following year, Fox Film Corporation made it into a motion picture of the same name directed by Harry F. Millarde.

In 1922, his book This Freedom was published to controversy, seen by the women's rights movement as an anti-feminist novel. Rebecca West criticised This Freedom in an October 1922 article for Good Housekeeping, "Wives, Mothers, and Homes". G. K. Chesterton, however, suggested that "while the story might be criticized, the criticisms can certainly be criticized." In any case, This Freedom proved to be highly successful and was ranked by the New York Times as the 7th best-selling book in the United States for 1923 and the 6th best for all of 1924. The publishing historian George Stevens later described This Freedom as "probably the worst novel Little, Brown ever published". The next year, Hutchinson had another success with One Increasing Purpose that was the 10th best-selling book of 1925.

== Later life ==
Critical reception grew harsher later in his career. In 1925 the critic Henry Longan Stuart stated that: "Under the stimulus of popularity his mannerisms have attained a rank growth until a prose uncanny indeed is their result [with] little substance into which the sobor critic can sink his teeth." Stuart classed Hutchinson as among "the dunces and charlatans of letters", alongside the likes of Hall Caine and Marie Corelli.

In 1930, Hutchinson was so thrilled by the birth of his son he wrote a book about it called The Book of Simon. A Year That the Locust (1935) is an autobiography in the form of a diary.

During the war Hutchinson was a member of the Home Guard and an air raid warden in his home town of Eastbourne. Two novels were published during this period. He Looked for a City was described by Katherine Woods as "an earnest, old-fashioned novel whose purpose seems to be the presentation of the life of a 20th century saint". It Happened Like This is more experimental, structured as three separate stories, almost unrelated except that they share a common narrator. After the war he published no further novels, only a short biography, Of Swinburne, in 1960.

Hutchinson married Una Rosamond Bristow-Gapper in 1926, and there were two sons. He died in 1971 in Uckfield, Sussex, England.

== Bibliography ==
- (1908). Once Aboard the Lugger.
- (1912). The Happy Warrior.
- (1914). The Clean Heart.
- (1921). If Winter Comes.
- (1922). This Freedom.
- (1923). The Eighth Wonder and Other Stories.
- (1925). One Increasing Purpose.
- (1929). The Uncertain Trumpet.
- (1930). The Book of Simon.
- (1932). Big Business.
- (1933). The Soft Spot.
- (1935). A Year That the Locust.
- (1938). As Once You Were
- (1940). He Looked for a City.
- (1942). It Happened Like This.
- (1960). Of Swinburne.

Short stories

- "The Swordsman," Blackwood's Magazine, Vol. CCXI, January/June 1922.
- "Some Talk of Alexander." In: The Best British Short Stories of 1923. Boston: Small, Maynard & Company, Inc., 1923.
