= Basil Macdonald Hastings =

English author, journalist, and playwright (1881–1928)

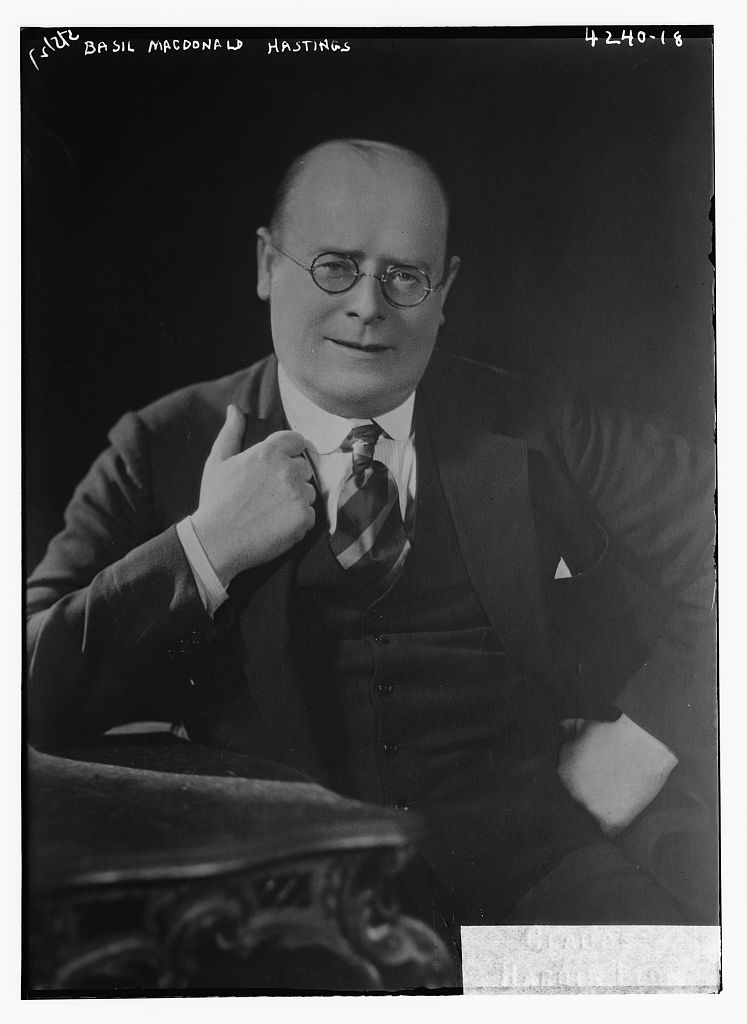
- Hastings circa 1927
- Born: 20 September 1881; Southwark, London, England
- Died: 21 February 1928 (aged 46); Southwark, London, England
- Occupations: Author, journalist, and playwright
- Children: Macdonald Hastings

Basil MacDonald Hastings (20 September 1881 – 21 February 1928) was an English author, journalist, and playwright.

== Early life and education ==
Hastings was born on 20 September 1881 in London, second son of solicitor S. J. Edward Hastings. He was educated at Stonyhurst and King's College London. His nephew- son of his elder brother, Major Lewis Aloysius Macdonald Hastings (1880-1966), a farmer in Southern Rhodesia, where he had been a diamond prospector, political organizer, and served in the Cape Mounted Police- was the politician Stephen Hastings.

== Career ==
Hastings was on the War Office staff for eight years before being appointed assistant editor of The Bystander, where he remained for three years. During the First World War, Hastings served as a second lieutenant in the Royal Flying Corps, having previously been a corporal in the King's Royal Rifle Corps; he founded and edited the RAF journal, The Fledgling (later Roosters and Fledglings). Hastings was a friend, collaborator, and regular correspondent of Joseph Conrad. Hastings produced a successful adaptation of Conrad's novel Victory performed at the Globe Theatre in London in 1919. By this time, Hastings had "already written several plays and collaborated on two others with Eden Phillpotts". Hastings's best-known play, The New Sin (1912), "had some success on the London stage".

He died on 21 February 1928 in London after a "lengthy illness", at age 46.

== Personal life ==
Hastings married Wilhelmina ("Billie") Creusen White, of a Catholic family from Peckham, South London, some of the members of which subsequently "developed social pretensions" and treated her with condescension, according to her grandson Max Hastings. They had a son- journalist and author (Douglas Edward) Macdonald Hastings (father of the journalist, author and historian Max Hastings)- and a daughter.
