= Ode to the West Wind =

1820 ode by Percy Bysshe Shelley

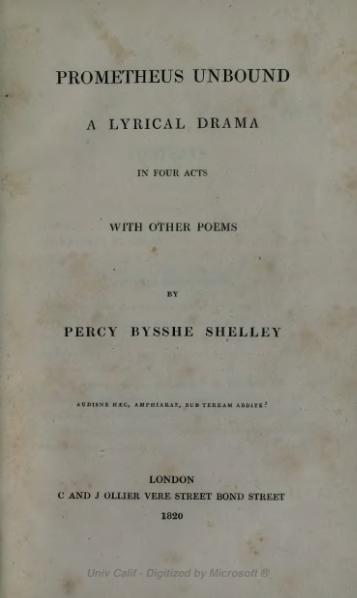
1820 cover of Prometheus Unbound, C. and J. Collier, London

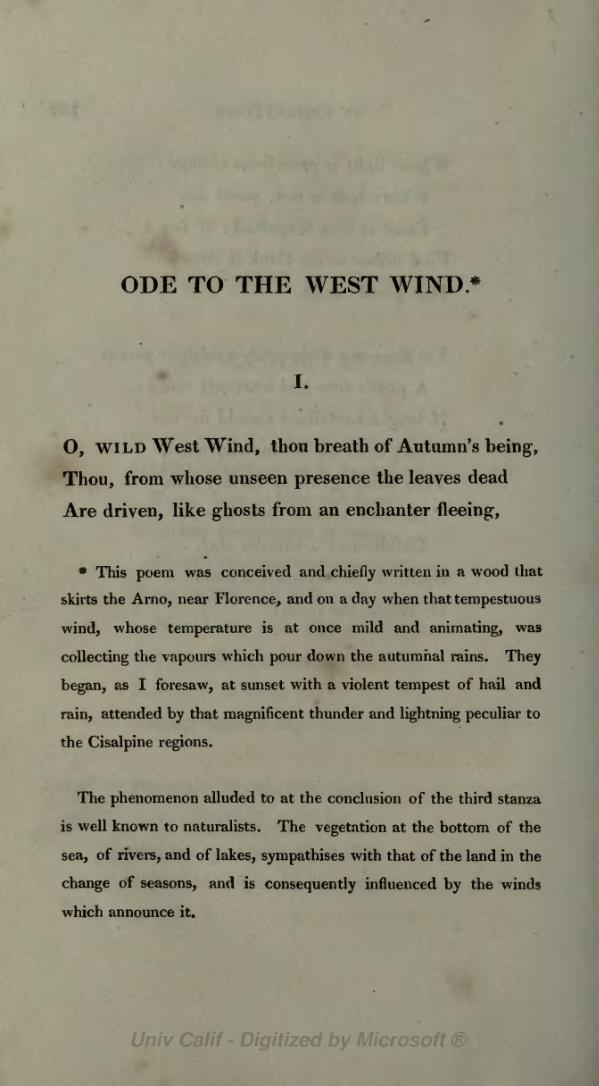
1820 publication in the collection Prometheus Unbound with Other Poems

"Ode to the West Wind" is an ode written by Percy Bysshe Shelley in 1819, in Cascine wood, near Florence, Italy. It was originally published in 1820 by Charles Ollier in London as part of the collection Prometheus Unbound, A Lyrical Drama in Four Acts, With Other Poems.

Shelley wanted his message of reform and peaceful, nonviolent revolution spread. The wind becomes the trope for disseminating the word of change through the poet-prophet figure.

Another view is that the poem was written in response to the loss of his son, William (born to Mary Shelley) in 1819. The ensuing pain influenced Shelley. The poem allegorizes the role of the poet as the voice of change and revolution. At the time of composing this poem, Shelley also had the Peterloo Massacre of August 1819 in mind. His other poems written at the same time, "The Masque of Anarchy", Prometheus Unbound, "Song to the Men of England", and "England in 1819", take up these same themes of political change, revolution, and the role of the poet.

== Genre ==
In ancient Greek tradition, an ode was considered a form of formal public invocation. It was usually a poem with a complex structure and was chanted or sung on important religious or state ceremonies. According to Harold Bloom, "Ode to the West Wind" reflects two types of ode traditions: odes written by Pindar and the Horatian ode. The odes of Pindar were exalted in tone and celebrated human accomplishments, whereas the Horatian odes were personal and contemplative rather than public. Shelley combines the two elements in this poem. In the English tradition, the ode was more of a "vehicle for expressing the sublime, lofty thoughts of intellectual and spiritual concerns". This purpose is also reflected in Shelley's ode.

== Structure ==
"Ode to the West Wind" consists of five sections or cantos written in terza rima. Each section consists of four tercets, ABA, BCB, CDC, DED, and a rhyming couplet, EE. The ode is written in iambic pentameter.

The poem begins with three sections describing the wind's effects upon earth, air, and ocean. In the last two sections, the poet speaks directly to the wind, asking for its power, to lift him up and make him its companion in its wanderings. The poem ends with an optimistic note, that if winter days are here then spring is not very far.

== Summary ==
The poem is divided into two parts: the first three cantos are on the qualities of the Wind. Each ends with the invocation "Oh hear!" The last two cantos show the relationship between the Wind and the speaker. Each canto of the poem has a different and unique theme which connects it to the central idea.

=== First Canto ===
The first stanza begins with the alliteration "wild West Wind" (line 1). The form of the apostrophe makes the wind also a personification. There is no optimism about the wind; the association is with autumn. The first lines contain personification, such as "leaves dead" (2), death being highlighted by the inversion, putting "dead" (2) at the end of the line. The leaves haunt as "ghosts" (3) that flee from something that panics them.

"Who chariotest to their dark wintry bed". Shelley uses "chariotest" (6) in the second person singular verb form of the noun "chariot". The "corpse within its grave" (8) in the next line is in contrast to the "azure sister of the Spring" (9), a reference to the east wind, whose "living hues and odours" (12) evoke a strong contrast to the colours of the fourth line that evoke death. In the last line of the canto, the west wind is regarded as the "Destroyer" (14) because it drives the last signs of life from the trees and as the "Preserver" (14) for scattering the seeds which will come to life in the spring.

"Who chariotest to their dark wintry bed

The winged seeds, where they lie cold and low,
Each like a corpse within its grave, until
Thine azure sister of the Spring shall blow."

=== Second Canto ===
The second canto discusses the wind's effect on the air. The sky's "clouds"(16) are "like earth's decaying leaves" (16). This is a reference to the second line of the first canto ("leaves dead", 2). The clouds also are numerous in number like the dead leaves. Through this reference the landscape is recalled again. The "clouds" (16) are "Shook from the tangled boughs of Heaven and Ocean" (17). This refers to the fact that the line between the sky and the stormy sea is indistinguishable and the entire space from the horizon to the zenith is covered with trailing storm clouds. The "clouds" are also "Angels of rain" (18). Similarly to divine intervention, they are messengers that bring a message from heaven down to earth through rain and lightning. These two natural phenomena with their "fertilizing and illuminating power" bring a change.

Line 21 begins with the line: "Of some fierce Maenad". The west wind is emphasized in the second canto; it is two things at once: first it is a "dirge/Of the dying year" (23–24) and second it is "a prophet of tumult whose prediction is decisive"; a prophet who does not only bring "black rain, and fire, and hail" (28), but who "will burst" (28) it. The "locks of the approaching storm" (23) are the messengers of this bursting: the "clouds".

Shelley also mentions that when the West Wind blows, it is singing a funeral song about the year coming to an end and that the sky covered with a dome of clouds looks like a "sepulchre", a burial chamber or grave for the dying year.

Shelley in this canto "expands his vision from the earthly scene with the leaves before him to take in the vaster commotion of the skies". The wind is no longer at the horizon and, therefore, far away, but it is exactly above us. The clouds now reflect the image of the swirling leaves; this is parallelism that gives evidence that we lifted "our attention from the finite world into the macrocosm". The "clouds" can also be compared with the leaves. But the clouds are more unstable and larger than the leaves. They are also messengers of rain and lightning.

=== Third Canto ===
This canto refers to the effect of the West Wind on the ocean or water. The question that arises is: What is the subject of the verb "saw" (33). On the one hand, there is the "blue Mediterranean" (30). With the "Mediterranean" as the subject of the canto, the "syntactical movement" is continued and there is no break in the fluency of the poem; it is stated that "he lay, / Lull'd by the coil of his crystalline streams, / Beside a pumice isle in Baiae's bay, / And saw in sleep old palaces and towers" (30–33).

On the other hand, the lines of this canto can refer to the "wind" again. Then the verb that belongs to the "wind" as subject is not "lay", but the previous line of the canto, "Thou who didst waken ... And saw" (29, 33). But whoever, the "Mediterranean" or the "wind", "saw" (33), the question remains whether the city one of them saw, is real and therefore a reflection on the water of a city that really exists on the coast; or the city is just an illusion.

David B. Pirie is uncertain of which it is in his analysis in Shelley.. He argues that it is "a creative interpretation of the billowing seaweed; or of the glimmering sky reflected on the heaving surface". Both are reasonable conclusions. To explain the appearance of an underwater world, it might be easier to explain it by something that is realistic; and that might be that the wind is able to produce illusions on the water. With its pressure, the wind "would waken the appearance of a city". From what is known of the "wind" from the last two cantos, it became clear that the wind is something that plays the role of a Creator. Whether the wind creates real things or illusions is not important.

Baiae's bay at the northern end of the Gulf of Naples contains visible Roman ruins underwater that have been shifted due to earthquakes. The moss and flowers are seaweed.

The third canto shows, in comparison to the previous cantos, a turning-point. Whereas Shelley had accepted death and changes in life in the first and second canto, he now turns to "wistful reminiscence [, recalls] an alternative possibility of transcendence". From line 26 to line 36 he presents an image of nature. But if line 36 is examined closer, it is apparent that the sentence is not what it appears to be, because it means so sweet that one feels faint in describing them. This shows that the idyllic picture is not what it appears to be and that the harmony will soon be destroyed. Lines later, Shelley speaks about "fear" (41). This again shows the influence of the west wind which announces the change of the season.

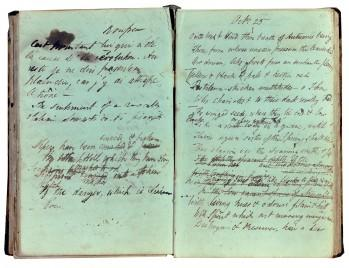
Percy Bysshe Shelley's fair draft of lines 1–42, 1819, Bodleian Library

=== Fourth Canto ===
Whereas cantos one to three began with "O wild West Wind" and "Thou" (15, 29) and were directed to the wind, there is a change in the fourth canto. The focus is no longer on the "wind", but on the speaker who says "If I ..." (43–44). Until this part, the poem has appeared very anonymously and was only concentrated on the wind and its forces so that the author of the poem was forgotten. Pirie calls this "the suppression of personality" which finally vanishes at that part of the poem.

In this canto, the emphasis is increasingly on the author himself. This is shown by the frequency of the author's use of the first-person pronouns "I" (43–44, 48, 51, 54), "my" (48, 52), and "me" (53). These pronouns appear nine times in the fourth canto. The author seeks to dramatize the atmosphere so that the reader recalls the situation of canto one to three. He achieves this by using the same pictures of the previous cantos in this one. Whereas these pictures, such as "leaf", "cloud", and "wave" have existed only together with the wind, they are now existing with the author. The author thinks about being one of them and says "If I were a . . ." (43 ff.). Shelley here identifies himself with the wind, although he knows that he cannot do that, because it is impossible for someone to put all the things he has learned from life aside and enter a "world of innocence". That Shelley is deeply aware of his closedness in life and his identity shows his command in line 53. There he says "Oh, lift me up as a wave, a leaf, a cloud" (53). He knows that this is something impossible to achieve, but he does not stop praying for it. The only chance Shelley sees to make his prayer and wish for a new identity with the Wind come true is by pain or death, as death leads to rebirth. So, he wants to "fall upon the thorns of life" and "bleed" (54).

At the end of the canto the poet reveals that "a heavy weight of hours has chain'd and bow'd" (55) "one" who is like the wind, "tameless, and swift, and proud". This is a reference to the years that have passed and "chained and bowed" (55) the hope of the people who fought for freedom and were literally imprisoned. Based on this interpretation, the West Wind has a different meaning. This could also be a reference to the poet himself. The wind is the "uncontrollable" (47) which is "tameless" (56). This canto is also a prayer or confession of the poet. Shelley addresses Nature but not God. Shelley was a staunch atheist. One of the characteristics of Romanticism is the equating of nature with divinity, with the West Wind symbolizing the role of God.

"Oh, lift me as a wave, a leaf, a cloud!
I fall upon the thorns of life! I bleed!

A heavy weight of hours has chain'd and bow'd
One too like thee: tameless, and swift, and proud."

Shelley also changes his use of metaphors in this canto. In the first cantos the wind was a metaphor explained at full length. Now the metaphors are only weakly presented: "the thorns of life" (54). Shelley also leaves out the fourth element: the fire. In the previous cantos he wrote about the earth, the air and the water. The reader now expects the fire, but it is not there. This leads to a break in the symmetry.

=== Fifth Canto ===
The wind is prominent in this last canto throughout. At the beginning of the poem the wind was only capable of blowing the leaves from the trees. In the previous canto the poet identified himself with the leaves. In this canto the wind is now capable of using both.

Everything that had been presented before was part of the elements: wind, earth, and water. Now the fourth element comes in: the fire.

There is also a confrontation in this canto: Whereas in line 57 Shelley writes "me thy", there is "thou me" in line 62. These pronouns appear seven times in the fifth canto. This "signals a restored confidence, if not in the poet’s own abilities, at least in his capacity to communicate with ... the Wind".

The first-person pronouns again appear in great frequency; but the possessive pronoun "my" predominates. Unlike the frequent use of the "I" in the previous canto that made the canto sound self-conscious, this canto sounds self-possessed. The canto is no more a request or a prayer as it had been in the fourth canto—it is a demand. The poet becomes the wind's instrument, his "lyre" (57). This is a symbol of the poet's own passivity towards the wind; he becomes his musician and the wind's breath becomes his breath. The poet's attitude towards the wind has changed: in the first canto the wind has been an "enchanter" (3), now the wind has become an "incantation" (65).

There is another contrast between the two last cantos: in the fourth canto the poet had articulated himself in singular: "a leaf" (43, 53), "a cloud" (44, 53), "A wave" (45, 53) and "One too like thee" (56). In this canto, the "sense of personality as vulnerably individualised led to self-doubt" and the greatest fear was that what was "tameless, and swift, and proud" (56) will stay "chain'd and bow'd" (55). The last canto differs from that. The poet in this canto uses plural forms, for example, "my leaves" (58, 64), "thy harmonies" (59), "my thoughts" (63), "ashes and sparks" (67) and "my lips" (68). By the use of the plural, the poet is able to show that there is some kind of peace and pride in his words. It even seems as if he has redefined himself because the uncertainty of the previous canto has been blown away. The "leaves" merge with those of an entire forest and "Will" become components in a whole tumult of mighty harmonies. The use of this "Will" (60) is certainly a reference to the future. Through the future meaning, the poem itself does not only sound as something that might have happened in the past, but it may even be a "prophecy" (69) for what might come: the future.

Finally, Shelley again calls the Wind in a prayer and even wants it to be "his" Spirit: "My spirit! Be thou me, impetuous one!" (62). Like the leaves of the trees in a forest, his leaves will fall and decay and will perhaps soon flourish again when the spring comes. That may be why he is looking forward to the spring and asks at the end of the last canto "If Winter comes, can Spring be far behind?" (70). This is of course a rhetorical question because spring does come after winter, but the "if" suggests that it might not come if the rebirth is strong and extensive enough, and if it is not, another renewal, spring, will come anyway. Thus, the question has a deeper meaning and does not only refer to the change of seasons, but is a reference to death and rebirth as well.

It also indicates that after the struggles and problems in life, there will always be a solution. It shows us the optimistic view of the poet about life which he would like the world to know. It is an interpretation of his saying, If you are suffering now, there will be good times ahead. But the most powerful call to the Wind are the lines: "Drive my dead thoughts over the universe/like withered leaves to quicken a new birth!" Here Shelley is imploring, or chanting to, the Wind to blow away all of his useless thoughts so that he can be a vessel for the Wind and, as a result, awaken the Earth.

"Scatter, as from an unextinguish'd hearth
Ashes and sparks, my words among mankind!
Be through my lips to unawaken'd earth

The trumpet of a prophecy! O Wind,
If Winter comes, can Spring be far behind?"

== Conclusion ==
The poem is a highly controlled text about the role of the poet as the agent of political and moral change. The speaker implores the wind to lift him up and make him its instrument, asking to be a metaphorical lyre or a trumpet to spread and disseminate his revolutionary ideas and thoughts around the world. This was a recurring theme in Shelley's works, especially in 1819, with the most forceful version articulated in the last often quoted lines of "A Defence of Poetry": "Poets are the hierophants of an unapprehended inspiration; the mirrors of the gigantic shadows which futurity casts upon the present; the words which express what they understand not; the trumpets which sing to battle, and feel not what they inspire; the influence which is moved not, but moves. Poets are the unacknowledged legislators of the world."

== Sources ==
- Anderson, Phillip B. "Shelley's 'Ode to the West Wind' and Hardy's 'The Darkling Thrush' ". Publications of the Arkansas Philological Association, 8.1 (1982): 10–14.
- Bass, Eben. "The Fourth Element in 'Ode to the West Wind'." Papers on Language and Literature 3.4 (1967): 327.
- Chayes, Irene H. "Rhetoric as Drama: An Approach to the Romantic Ode." PMLA, 79 (March 1964): 71–74. In Reiman, D., and Powers, S. (Eds.), Shelley's Poetry and Prose: Authoritative Texts, Criticism. NY: W.W. Norton, 1977. pp. 620–25.
- Duffy, Edward. "Where Shelley Wrote and What He Wrote For: The Example of 'The Ode to the West Wind' ". Studies in Romanticism, 23.3 (1984): 351–77.
- Edgecombe, Rodney Stenning. "'Creative Unbundling': Henry IV Parts I and II and Shelley's 'Ode to the West Wind'". Keats-Shelley Review, 11 (1997): 133–39.
- Faiz, Zainab. "THE SYMBIOCENE IN 'ODE TO THE WEST WIND': READING ROMANTIC POETRY THROUGH AN ECOCRITICAL LENS." CURRENTS 9 (2023).
- Fogle, Richard Harter. "The Imaginal Design of Shelley's 'Ode to the West Wind' ". ELH, Vol. 15, No. 3 (Sep. 1948), pp. 219–26.
- Forman, Harry Buxton. "How Shelley Approached the 'Ode to the West Wind' ". Bulletin and Review of the Keats-Shelley Memorial, Rome (London, 1913), I, No. 2, 6.
- Friederich, R.H. "The Apocalyptic Mode and Shelley's 'Ode to the West Wind'." Renascence, vol. 36, no. 3, (1984), pp. 161–70.
- Gonzalez Groba, Constante. "Structure and Development of Shelley's 'Ode to the West Wind' ". Senara, 3 (1981): 247–52.
- Haworth, Helen E. "'Ode to the West Wind' and the Sonnet Form". Keats-Shelley Journal, Vol. 20, (1971), pp. 71–77.
- Jost, François. "Anatomy of an Ode: Shelley and the Sonnet Tradition". Comparative Literature, Vol. 34, No. 3 (Summer, 1982), pp. 223–46.
- Joukovsky, Nicholas A. "Contemporary Notices of Shelley: Addenda to 'The Unextinguished Hearth' ". Keats-Shelley Journal, Vol. 56, (2007), pp. 173–95.
- Kapstein, I.J. "The Symbolism of the Wind and the Leaves in Shelley's 'Ode to the West Wind' ". PMLA, Vol. 51, No. 4 (December 1936), pp. 1069–79.
- Leyda, Seraphia D. "Windows of Meaning in 'Ode to the West Wind' ". Hall, Spencer (ed.). Approaches to Teaching Shelley's Poetry. New York: MLA, 1990. 79–82.
- MacEachen, Dougald B. CliffsNotes on Shelley's Poems. 29 July 2011.
- Pancoast, Henry S. "Shelley's 'Ode to the West Wind' ". MLN, (1920), XXXV, 97.
- Parsons, Coleman O. "Shelley's Prayer to the West Wind." Keats-Shelley Journal, Vol. 11, (Winter, 1962), pp. 31–37.
- Powell, Eric Tyler. "Form, History, and the Politics of Lyric in Shelley's 'Ode to the West Wind'." ELH 90.3 (2023): 723-765.
- Rowe, Paul S. "Transformative Apostrophe: Astonishing Effects of Assimilation in Shelley’s 'Ode to the West Wind'." Literary Imagination 19.1 (2017): 30-53.
- Saeed, Syeda Laila, Sawaira Idris, and Muhammad Idris. "The Positive Thinking in Shelley’s Poem 'Ode to the West Wind': A Critical Discourse Analysis." Research Journal of Social Sciences and Economics Review 4.1 (2023): 218-223.
- SparkNotes Editors. "SparkNote on Shelley’s Poetry". SparkNotes LLC. 2002. (accessed July 11, 2011).
- Wagner, Jennifer. "A Figure of Resistance: The Visionary Reader in Shelley's Sonnets and the 'West Wind' Ode." Southwest Review 77.1 (1992): 109-127.
- Wagner, Stephen and Doucet Devin Fischer. "The Pforzheimer Collection of Shelley and His Circle: The Collection and the Collector." Biblion, 5.1 (1996): 52–57.
- White, Newman Ivey. The Unextinguished Hearth: Shelley and His Contemporary Critics. Durham, NC, Duke University Press, 1938.
- Wilcox, Stewart C. "The Prosodic Structure of 'Ode to the West Wind'." Notes and Queries, Volume CXCV, (18 February 1950), pp. 77–78.
- Wilcox, Stewart C. "Imagery, Ideas, and Design in Shelley's 'Ode to the West Wind' ". Studies in Philology, Vol. 47, No. 4 (Oct. 1950), pp. 634–49.
- Wright, John W. Shelley's Myth of Metaphor. Athens, GA: University of Georgia Press, 1970.
- Yan, Chen. "Research on the Translation of 'Ode to the West Wind' in China". Journal of Jixi University, 2008.
- Zhan, Donghong. "Metaphors in the First Stanza of 'Ode to the West Wind': A Cognitive Linguistic Approach." Asian Social Science 5.7 (2009): 18-22.
