= 1985 in literature =

This article contains information about the literary events and publications of 1985.

== Events ==
- February 25 – Sue Limb's parodic pastiche of the Lake Poets, The Wordsmiths at Gorsemere, begins broadcasting on BBC Radio 4 in the U.K.
- March 1 – The GNU Manifesto by Richard Stallman is published for the first time, and becomes a fundamental philosophical source within the free software movement.
- August 11 – A memorial to the poet Hugh MacDiarmid is unveiled near his home at Langholm, Scotland.
- various dates – Three notable novels in English by female authors are published during the year: Margaret Atwood's The Handmaid's Tale, Jilly Cooper's Riders, the first of the Rutshire Chronicles, and Jeanette Winterson's Oranges Are Not the Only Fruit.

== New books ==
=== Fiction ===
- Isaac Asimov – Robots and Empire
- Margaret Atwood – The Handmaid's Tale
- Jean M. Auel – The Mammoth Hunters
- Iain Banks – Walking on Glass
- Clive Barker – The Damnation Game
- Greg Bear
  - Blood Music
  - Eon
- M. C. Beaton – Death of a Gossip
- Thomas Bernhard – Old Masters: a comedy (Alte Meister: Komödie)
- Anthony Burgess – The Kingdom of the Wicked
- Orson Scott Card – Ender's Game
- Jilly Cooper – Riders
- Bernard Cornwell – Sharpe's Honour
- Don DeLillo – White Noise
- Friedrich Dürrenmatt – The Execution of Justice (Justiz)
- Bret Easton Ellis – Less than Zero
- John Fowles – A Maggot
- Carlos Fuentes – The Old Gringo (Gringo Viejo)
- William Gaddis – Carpenter's Gothic
- Gabriel García Márquez – Love in the Time of Cholera (El amor en los tiempos del cólera)
- Alasdair Gray – The Fall of Kelvin Walker: A Fable of the Sixties
- Graham Greene – The Tenth Man
- Amy Hempel – Reasons to Live
- Frank Herbert – Chapterhouse: Dune
- John Irving – The Cider House Rules
- Garrison Keillor – Lake Wobegon Days
- Stephen King – Skeleton Crew
- László Krasznahorkai – Satantango
- Ursula K. Le Guin – Always Coming Home
- Doris Lessing – The Good Terrorist
- Cormac McCarthy – Blood Meridian
- Larry McMurtry – Lonesome Dove
- John D. MacDonald – The Lonely Silver Rain
- James A. Michener – Texas
- Brian Moore – Black Robe
- Iris Murdoch – The Good Apprentice
- Ellis Peters – An Excellent Mystery
- Caryl Phillips – The Final Passage
- Barbara Pym (died 1980) – Crampton Hodnet (written 1940)
- Carl Sagan – Contact
- Sidney Sheldon – If Tomorrow Comes
- Sue Townsend – Rebuilding Coventry
- Anne Tyler – The Accidental Tourist
- Andrew Vachss – Flood
- Kurt Vonnegut – Galápagos
- Jeanette Winterson – Oranges Are Not the Only Fruit
- Roger Zelazny – Trumps of Doom

=== Children and young people ===
- Chester Aaron – Out of Sight, Out of Mind
- Pamela Allen – A Lion in the Night
- Chris Van Allsburg – The Polar Express
- Frank Asch – I Can Blink
- Robert Cormier – Beyond the Chocolate War
- Roald Dahl – The Giraffe and the Pelly and Me
- Virginia Hamilton (with Leo and Diane Dillon) – The People Could Fly: American Black Folktales
- Patricia MacLachlan – Sarah, Plain and Tall
- Laura Numeroff – If You Give a Mouse a Cookie
- Pat O'Shea – The Hounds of the Morrigan
- Cynthia Rylant – A Blue-Eyed Daisy
- Jacqueline Wilson – How to Survive Summer Camp (novel)
- Elizabeth Winthrop – The Castle in the Attic

=== Drama ===
- Peter Brook and Jean-Claude Carrière (adapted) – Mahabharata
- Christopher Hampton (adapted) – Les Liaisons Dangereuses
- David Hare and Howard Brenton – Pravda
- Wallace Shawn – Aunt Dan and Lemon
- Sam Shepard – A Lie of the Mind
- Neil Simon – Biloxi Blues
- August Wilson – Fences

=== Poetry ===
- Carol Ann Duffy – Standing Female Nude

=== Non-fiction ===
- Bill Bryson – The Palace under the Alps and Over 200 Other Unusual, Unspoiled and Infrequently Visited Spots in 16 European Countries
- Roger Caron – Bingo! The Horrifying Eyewitness Account of a Prison Riot
- Allen Carr – The Easy Way to Stop Smoking
- Michael Denton – Evolution: A Theory in Crisis
- Elaine Dundy – Elvis and Gladys
- Julien Gracq – The Shape of a City
- G. L. Harriss (editor) – Henry V: The Practice of Kingship
- Ernest Hemingway – The Dangerous Summer
- David Lowenthal – The Past Is a Foreign Country
- Walter A. McDougall – ...The Heavens and the Earth: A Political History of the Space Age
- Tim O'Brien – The Nuclear Age
- Priscilla Beaulieu Presley – Elvis and Me
- David Robinson – Chaplin: His Life and Art
- Oliver Sacks – The Man Who Mistook His Wife for a Hat
- Roger Scruton – Thinkers of the New Left
- Gary Soto – Living Up the Street
- Frederick Andrew Lerner – Modern Science Fiction and the American Literary Community

== Births ==
- February 7 – Justina Ireland, American science-fiction and fantasy author of young-adult fiction
- April 24 – Alexander Zeldin, British playwright and director
- September 24 – Eleanor Catton, New Zealand novelist
- September 30 – Téa Obreht, Yugoslav-born American novelist writing in English
- Alisa Ganieva, Russian fiction writer and critic

== Deaths ==
- January 1 – Sigerson Clifford, Irish poet, playwright, and civil servant (born 1913)
- January 5 – Alexis Rannit, Estonian-born American poet and critic (born 1914)
- February 6 – James Hadley Chase, English thriller novelist (born 1906)
- February 19 – Carl Joachim Hambro, Norwegian novelist, essayist and philologist (born 1914)
- March 15 – Radha Krishna Choudhary, Indian historian and philosopher (born 1921)
- April 4 – Kate Roberts, Welsh writer (born 1891)
- April 7 – Carl Schmitt, German political theorist (born 1888)
- April 17
  - Basil Bunting, English poet (born 1900)
  - D. I. Suchianu, Romanian essayist, translator, social scientist and film theorist (born 1895)
- April 25 – Uku Masing, Estonian religious philosopher, linguist and writer (born 1909)
- May 1 – Denise Robins, English romantic novelist (born 1897)
- May 12 – Josephine Miles, American poet and literary critic (born 1911)
- May 18 – Hedley Bull, Australian economist (cancer, born 1932)
- May 25 – Robert Nathan, American novelist and poet (born 1894)
- June 8 – Hu Feng (胡风), Chinese novelist (born 1902)
- June 16 – Ernst Orvil, Norwegian novelist, poet and playwright (born 1898)
- July 16 – Heinrich Böll, German novelist, Nobel laureate (born 1917)
- July 8 – Leslie Paul, Anglo-Irish novelist (born 1905)
- July 29 – Judah Waten, Australian novelist (born 1911)
- August 14 – Alfred Hayes, English-born American novelist, poet and screenwriter (born 1911)
- August 30 – (Janet) Taylor Caldwell, English-born American novelist (born 1900)
- September 1 – Saunders Lewis, Welsh writer and broadcaster (Plaid Cymru) (born 1893)
- September 17 – Fran Ross, African American satirist (born 1935)
- September 22 – D. J. Opperman, South African Afrikaans poet (born 1914)
- September 27 – Leonard Gribble, English novelist (born 1908)
- October 1 – E. B. White, American children's writer and writer on style (born 1899)
- October 11 – Alex La Guma, South African novelist and political activist (born 1925)
- October 24 – László Bíró, Hungarian journalist and inventor (born 1899)
- October 31 – Nikos Engonopoulos, Greek poet (born 1903)
- November 3 – J. M. Wallace-Hadrill, English historian (born 1916)
- November 4 – Hilda Vaughan, Welsh novelist and short story writer (born 1892)
- November 6 – Sara Woods, British crime fiction writer (born 1922)
- November 11 – James Hanley, English-born novelist and dramatist of Irish extraction (born 1897)
- November 25
  - Geoffrey Grigson, English poet and critic (born 1905)
  - Elsa Morante, Italian novelist (born 1912)
- November 27 – Fernand Braudel, French historian (born 1902)
- December 2 – Philip Larkin, English poet (born 1922)
- December 5 – Mihail Celarianu, Romanian poet and novelist (born 1893)
- December 7 – Robert Graves, English novelist, poet and critic (born 1895)

== Awards ==
- Nobel Prize for Literature: Claude Simon

=== Australia ===
- The Australian/Vogel Literary Award: no award given out this year
- C. J. Dennis Prize for Poetry: Kevin Hart, Your Shadow; Rosemary Dobson, The Three Fates
- Kenneth Slessor Prize for Poetry, Kevin Hart, Your Shadow
- Mary Gilmore Prize: Doris Brett, The Truth about Unicorns
- Miles Franklin Award: Christopher Koch, The Doubleman

=== Canada ===
- See 1985 Governor General's Awards for a complete list of winners and finalists for those awards.

=== France ===
- Prix Goncourt: Yann Queffélec, Les Noces barbares
- Prix Médicis French: Michel Braudeau, Naissance d'une passion
- Prix Médicis International: Joseph Heller, God Knows

=== Spain ===
- Miguel de Cervantes Prize: Gonzalo Torrente Ballester

=== United Kingdom ===
- Booker Prize: Keri Hulme, The Bone People
- Carnegie Medal for children's literature: Kevin Crossley-Holland, Storm
- Cholmondeley Award: Dannie Abse, Peter Redgrove, Brian Taylor
- Eric Gregory Award: Graham Mort, Adam Thorpe, Pippa Little, James Harpur, Simon North, Julian May
- James Tait Black Memorial Prize for fiction: Robert Edric, Winter Garden
- James Tait Black Memorial Prize for biography: David Nokes, Jonathan Swift: A Hypocrite Reversed
- Newdigate Prize: Robert Twigger
- Whitbread Best Book Award: Douglas Dunn, Elegies

=== United States ===
- Agnes Lynch Starrett Poetry Prize: Liz Rosenberg, The Fire Music
- American Academy of Arts and Letters Gold Medal in Poetry, Robert Penn Warren
- Frost Medal: Robert Penn Warren
- Nebula Award: Orson Scott Card, Ender's Game
- Newbery Medal for children's literature: Robin McKinley, The Hero and the Crown
- Pulitzer Prize for Drama: James Lapine for book; Stephen Sondheim for music and lyrics, Sunday in the Park With George
- Pulitzer Prize for Fiction: Alison Lurie – Foreign Affairs
- Pulitzer Prize for Poetry: Carolyn Kizer: Yin
- Whiting Awards (inaugural year):

Fiction: Raymond Abbott, Stuart Dybek, Wright Morris (fiction/nonfiction), Howard Norman, James Robison, Austin Wright (fiction/nonfiction)
Poetry: Douglas Crase, Jorie Graham, Linda Gregg, James Schuyler

=== Elsewhere ===
- Friedenspreis des Deutschen Buchhandels: Teddy Kollek
- Premio Nadal: Pau Faner Coll – Flor de sal
