= Bride and Groom =

A Bride and Groom refers to a man and woman who are about to be married or are newlywed.

Bride and Groom may also refer to:

- Bride and Groom (radio program) (1945-1950), an old-time radio program
- Bride and Groom (TV series) (1951-1958), based on the radio show
- Bride and Groom (rock formation)
- Bride and Groom (book), a 2018 novel

== See also ==
- Bride and Gloom (disambiguation)
