= Sputnik 1 =

First artificial Earth satellite

Sputnik
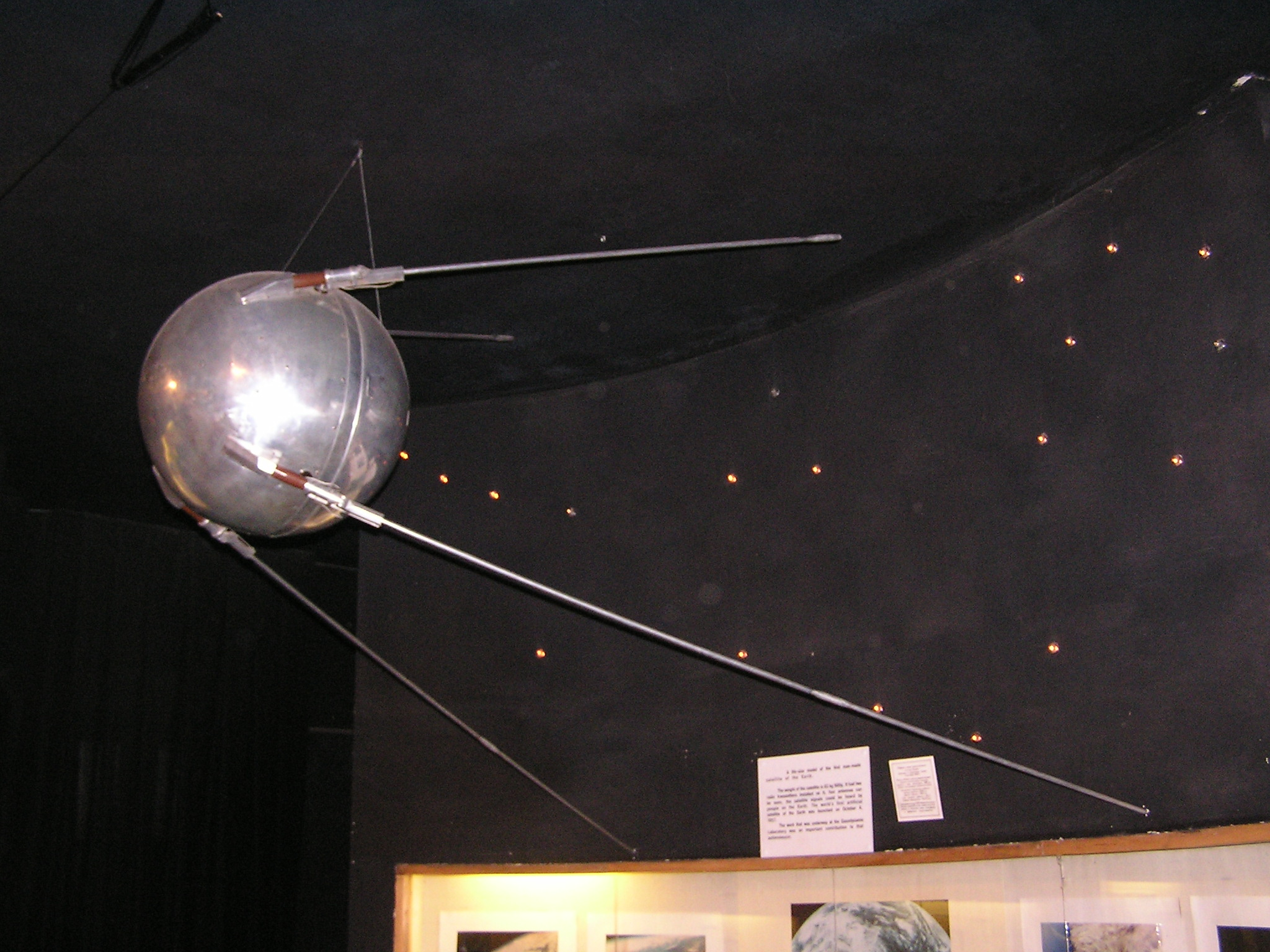
- Replica of Sputnik 1 in the Museum of Space and Missile Technology (Saint-Petersburg)
- Names: Спутник-1; Object PS (Prosteyshiy Sputnik); Простейший Спутник-1; Elementary Satellite 1
- Mission type: Technology demonstration
- Operator: OKB-1
- Harvard designation: 1957 Alpha 2
- COSPAR ID: 1957-001B
- SATCAT no.: 2 (The launch rocket has SATCAT no.1)
- Mission duration: 22 days (achieved)
- Orbits completed: 1,440

Spacecraft properties
- Spacecraft: Sputnik-1
- Manufacturer: OKB-1; Ministry of Radiotechnical Industry
- Launch mass: 83.6 kg (184 lb)
- Dimensions: 58 cm (23 in) diameter
- Power: 1 watt

Start of mission
- Launch date: 4 October 1957; 69 years ago, 19:28:34 UTC
- Rocket: Sputnik-PS 8K71PS
- Launch site: Baikonur Cosmodrome Site 1/5
- Contractor: OKB-1

End of mission
- Disposal: Atmospheric entry
- Last contact: 26 October 1957
- Decay date: 4 January 1958

Orbital parameters
- Reference system: Geocentric orbit
- Regime: Low Earth orbit
- Semi-major axis: 6,955.2 km
- Eccentricity: 0.05201
- Perigee altitude: 215 km (134 mi)
- Apogee altitude: 939 km (583 mi)
- Inclination: 65.10°
- Period: 96.20 minutes

Instruments
- Radio transmitter 20.005 and 40.002 MHz

Sputnik 1 (/ˈspʌtnɪk, ˈspʊtnɪk/, Russian: Спутник-1, Satellite 1), often referred to as simply Sputnik, was the first artificial Earth satellite. It was launched into an elliptical low Earth orbit by the Soviet Union on 4 October 1957 as part of the Soviet space program. It sent a radio signal back to Earth for three weeks before its three silver-zinc batteries became depleted. Aerodynamic drag caused it to fall back into the atmosphere on 4 January 1958.

It was a polished metal sphere 58 cm (23 in) in diameter with four external radio antennas to broadcast radio pulses. Its radio signal was easily detectable by amateur radio operators, and the 65° orbital inclination made its flight path cover virtually the entire inhabited Earth.

The satellite's success was unanticipated by the United States. This precipitated the American Sputnik crisis and triggered the start of the Space Race. The launch was the beginning of a new era of political, military, technological, and scientific developments. The word sputnik is Russian for satellite when interpreted in an astronomical context; its other meanings are spouse or travelling companion.

Tracking and studying Sputnik 1 from Earth provided scientists with valuable information. The density of the upper atmosphere could be deduced from its drag on the orbit, and the propagation of its radio signals gave data about the ionosphere.

Sputnik 1 was launched during the International Geophysical Year from Site No.1/5, at the 5th Tyuratam range, in Kazakh SSR (now known as the Baikonur Cosmodrome). The satellite travelled at a peak speed of about 8 km/s (18,000 mph), taking 96.20 minutes to complete each orbit. It transmitted on 20.005 and 40.002 MHz, which were monitored by radio operators throughout the world. The signals continued for 22 days until the transmitter batteries depleted on 26 October 1957. On 4 January 1958, after three months in orbit, Sputnik 1 burned up while reentering Earth's atmosphere, having completed 1,440 orbits of the Earth, and travelling a distance of approximately 70,000,000 km (43,000,000 mi).

== Etymology ==
Спутник-1, romanized as Sputnik-Odin (pronounced [ˈsputnʲɪk.ɐˈdʲin]), means 'Satellite-One'. The Russian word for satellite, sputnik, was coined in the 18th century by combining the prefix s- ('fellow') and putnik ('traveler'), thereby meaning 'fellow-traveler', a meaning corresponding to the Latin root satelles ('guard, attendant or companion'), which is the origin of English satellite. (In the West, dating from the 1930s, the term fellow traveler was already used as a pejorative to describe people who were philosophically sympathetic to communism.)

== Before the launch ==
=== Satellite construction project ===
On 17 December 1954, chief Soviet rocket scientist Sergei Korolev proposed a developmental plan for an artificial satellite to the Minister of the Defense Industry, Dimitri Ustinov. Korolev forwarded a report by Mikhail Tikhonravov, with an overview of similar projects abroad. Tikhonravov had emphasised that the launch of an orbital satellite was an inevitable stage in the development of rocket technology.

On 29 July 1955, U.S. President Dwight D. Eisenhower announced through his press secretary that, during the International Geophysical Year (IGY), the United States would launch an artificial satellite. Four days later, Leonid Sedov, a leading Soviet physicist, announced that they too would launch an artificial satellite. On 8 August, the Politburo of the Communist Party of the Soviet Union approved the proposal to create an artificial satellite. On 30 August, Vasily Ryabikov—the head of the State Commission on the R-7 rocket test launches—held a meeting where Korolev presented calculation data for a spaceflight trajectory to the Moon. They decided to develop a three-stage version of the R-7 rocket for satellite launches.

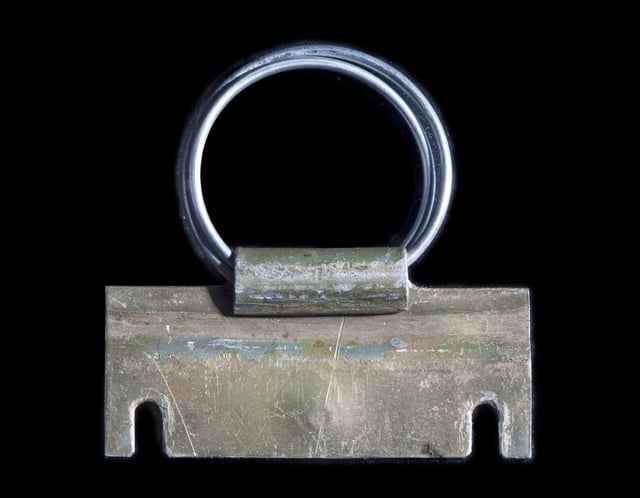
Last remaining piece of Sputnik 1: metal arming key which prevented contact between batteries and transmitter prior to launch; on display at the Smithsonian National Air and Space Museum

On 30 January 1956, the Council of Ministers approved practical work on an artificial Earth-orbiting satellite. This satellite, named Object D, was planned to be completed in 1957–58; it would have a mass of 1,000 to 1,400 kg (2,200 to 3,100 lb) and would carry 200 to 300 kg (440 to 660 lb) of scientific instruments. The first test launch of "Object D" was scheduled for 1957. Work on the satellite was to be divided among institutions as follows:

- The USSR Academy of Sciences was responsible for the general scientific leadership and the supply of research instruments.
- The Ministry of the Defense Industry and its primary design bureau, OKB-1, were assigned the task of building the satellite.
- The Ministry of the Radio technical Industry would develop the control system, radio/technical instruments, and the telemetry system.
- The Ministry of the Ship Building Industry would develop gyroscope devices.
- The Ministry of the Machine Building would develop ground launching, refuelling, and transportation means.
- The Ministry of Defense was responsible for conducting launches.

Preliminary design work was completed in July 1956 and the scientific tasks to be carried out by the satellite were defined. These included measuring the density of the atmosphere and its ion composition, the solar wind, magnetic fields, and cosmic rays. These data would be valuable in the creation of future artificial satellites; a system of ground stations was to be developed to collect data transmitted by the satellite, observe the satellite's orbit, and transmit commands to the satellite. Because of the limited time frame, observations were planned for only 7 to 10 days and orbit calculations were not expected to be extremely accurate.

By the end of 1956, it became clear that the complexity of the ambitious design meant that 'Object D' could not be launched in time because of difficulties creating scientific instruments and the low specific impulse produced by the completed R-7 engines (304 seconds instead of the planned 309 to 310 seconds). Consequently, the government rescheduled the launch for April 1958. Object D would later fly as Sputnik 3.

Fearing the U.S. would launch a satellite before the USSR, OKB-1 suggested the creation and launch of a satellite in April–May 1957, before the IGY began in July 1957. The new satellite would be simple, light (100 kg or 220 lb), and easy to construct, forgoing the complex, heavy scientific equipment in favour of a simple radio transmitter. On 15 February 1957 the Council of Ministers of the USSR approved this simple satellite, designated 'Object PS', PS meaning "prosteishiy sputnik", or "elementary satellite". This version allowed the satellite to be tracked visually by Earth-based observers, and it could transmit tracking signals to ground-based receiving stations. The launch of two satellites, PS-1 and PS-2, with two R-7 rockets (8K71), was approved, provided that the R-7 completed at least two successful test flights.

=== Launch vehicle preparation and launch site selection ===
R-7 Semyorka ICBM

Sputnik 8K71PS

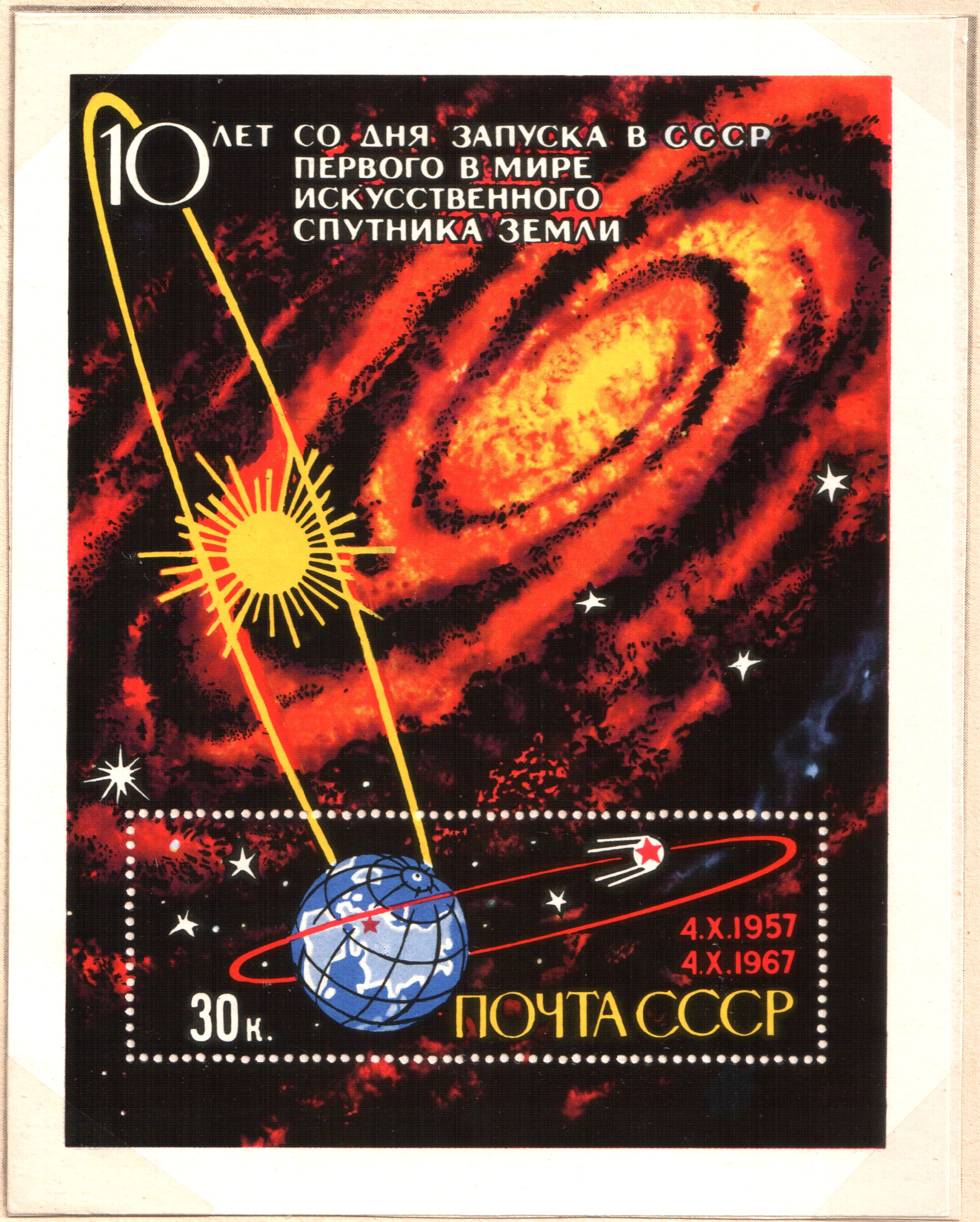
30 kopek USSR stamp depicting Sputnik 1 orbiting the Earth, the Earth orbiting the Sun and the Sun orbiting the centre of the Milky Way galaxy

One of the first reports of Sputnik 1 by Universal Newsreel on 7 October 1957. Note that the launch vehicle and some specifics are depicted incorrectly, owing to lack of knowledge released to the public.

The R-7 rocket was initially designed as an intercontinental ballistic missile (ICBM) by OKB-1. The decision to build it was made by the Central Committee of the Communist Party of the Soviet Union and the Council of Ministers of the USSR on 20 May 1954. The rocket was the most powerful in the world; it was designed with excess thrust since they were unsure how heavy the hydrogen bomb payload would be. The R-7 was also known by its GRAU (later GURVO, the Russian abbreviation for "Chief Directorate of the Rocket Forces") designation 8K71. At the time, the R-7 was known to NATO sources as the T-3 or M-104, and Type A.

Several modifications were made to the R-7 rocket to adapt it to 'Object D', including upgrades to the main engines, the removal of a 300 kg (660 lb) radio package on the booster, and a new payload fairing that made the booster almost four metres (14 feet) shorter than its ICBM version. Object D would later be launched as Sputnik 3 after the much lighter 'Object PS' (Sputnik 1) was launched first. The trajectory of the launch vehicle and the satellite were initially calculated using arithmometers and six-digit trigonometric tables. More complex calculations were carried out on a newly-installed computer at the Academy of Sciences.

A special reconnaissance commission selected Tyuratam for the construction of a rocket proving ground, the 5th Tyuratam range, usually referred to as "NIIP-5", or "GIK-5" in the post-Soviet time. The selection was approved on 12 February 1955 by the Council of Ministers of the USSR, but the site would not be completed until 1958. Actual work on the construction of the site began on 20 July by military building units.

The first launch of an R-7 rocket (8K71 No.5L) occurred on 15 May 1957. A fire began in the Blok D strap-on almost immediately at liftoff, but the booster continued flying until 98 seconds after launch when the strap-on broke away and the vehicle crashed 400 km (250 mi) downrange. Three attempts to launch the second rocket (8K71 No.6) were made on 10–11 June, but an assembly defect prevented launch. The unsuccessful launch of the third R-7 rocket (8K71 No.7) took place on 12 July. An electrical short caused the vernier engines to put the missile into an uncontrolled roll which resulted in all of the strap-ons separating 33 seconds into the launch. The R-7 crashed about 7 km (4.3 mi) from the pad.

The launch of the fourth rocket (8K71 No.8), on 21 August at 15:25 Moscow Time, was successful. The rocket's core boosted the dummy warhead to the target altitude and velocity, reentered the atmosphere, and broke apart at a height of 10 km (6.2 mi) after travelling 6,000 km (3,700 mi). On 27 August, the TASS issued a statement on the successful launch of a long-distance multistage ICBM. The launch of the fifth R-7 rocket (8K71 No.9), on 7 September, was also successful, but the dummy was also destroyed on atmospheric re-entry, and hence needed a redesign to completely fulfill its military purpose. The rocket, however, was deemed suitable for satellite launches, and Korolev was able to convince the State Commission to allow the use of the next R-7 to launch PS-1, allowing the delay in the rocket's military exploitation to launch the PS-1 and PS-2 satellites.

On 22 September a modified R-7 rocket, named Sputnik and indexed as 8K71PS, arrived at the proving ground and preparations for the launch of PS-1 began. Compared to the military R-7 test vehicles, the mass of 8K71PS was reduced from 280 to 272 tonnes (617,000 to 600,000 lb), its length with PS-1 was 29.167 metres (95 ft 8.3 in) and the thrust at liftoff was 3.90 MN (880,000 lb_{f}).

=== Observation complex ===
PS-1 was not designed to be controlled; it could only be observed. Initial data at the launch site would be collected at six separate observatories and telegraphed to NII-4. Located back in Moscow (at Bolshevo), NII-4 was a scientific research arm of the Ministry of Defence that was dedicated to missile development. The six observatories were clustered around the launch site, with the closest situated 1 km (0.62 mi) from the launch pad.

A second, nationwide observation complex was established to track the satellite after its separation from the rocket. Called the Command-Measurement Complex, it consisted of the coordination center in NII-4 and seven distant stations situated along the line of the satellite's ground track. These tracking stations were located at Tyuratam, Sary-Shagan, Yeniseysk, Klyuchi, Yelizovo, Makat in Guryev Oblast, and Ishkup in Krasnoyarsk Krai. Stations were equipped with radar, optical instruments, and communications systems. Data from stations were transmitted by telegraphs into NII-4 where ballistics specialists calculated orbital parameters.

The observatories used a trajectory measurement system called "Tral", developed by OKB MEI (Moscow Energy Institute), by which they received and monitored data from transponders mounted on the R-7 rocket's core stage. The data were useful even after the satellite's separation from the second stage of the rocket; Sputnik's location was calculated from data on the location of the second stage, which followed Sputnik at a known distance. Tracking of the booster during launch had to be accomplished through purely passive means, such as visual coverage and radar detection. R-7 test launches demonstrated that the tracking cameras were only good up to an altitude of 200 km (120 mi), but radar could track it for almost 500 km (310 mi).

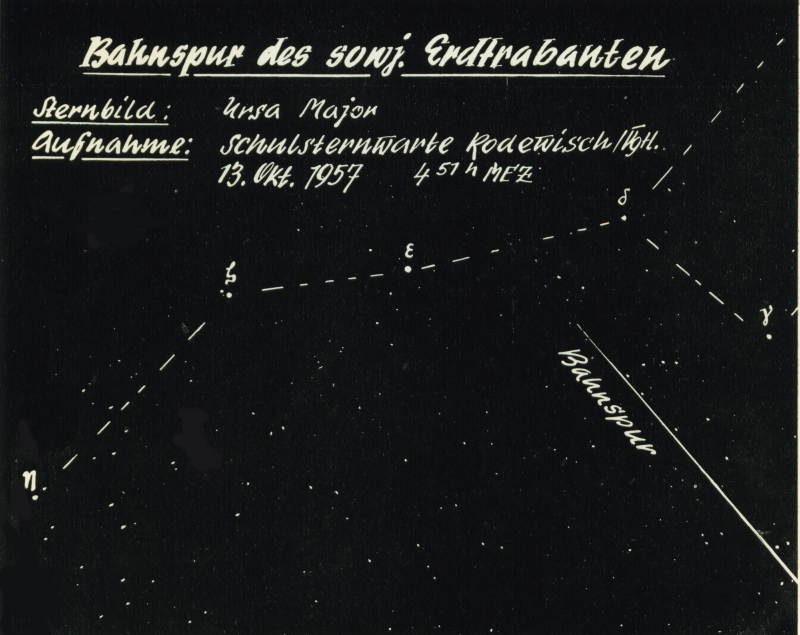
First ground track of Sputnik 1 on 13 October 1957 4:51 from Rodewisch

Outside the Soviet Union, the satellite was tracked by amateur radio operators in many countries. The booster rocket was located and tracked by the British using the Lovell Telescope at the Jodrell Bank Observatory, the only telescope in the world able to do so by radar. Canada's Newbrook Observatory was the first facility in North America to photograph Sputnik 1.

== Design ==
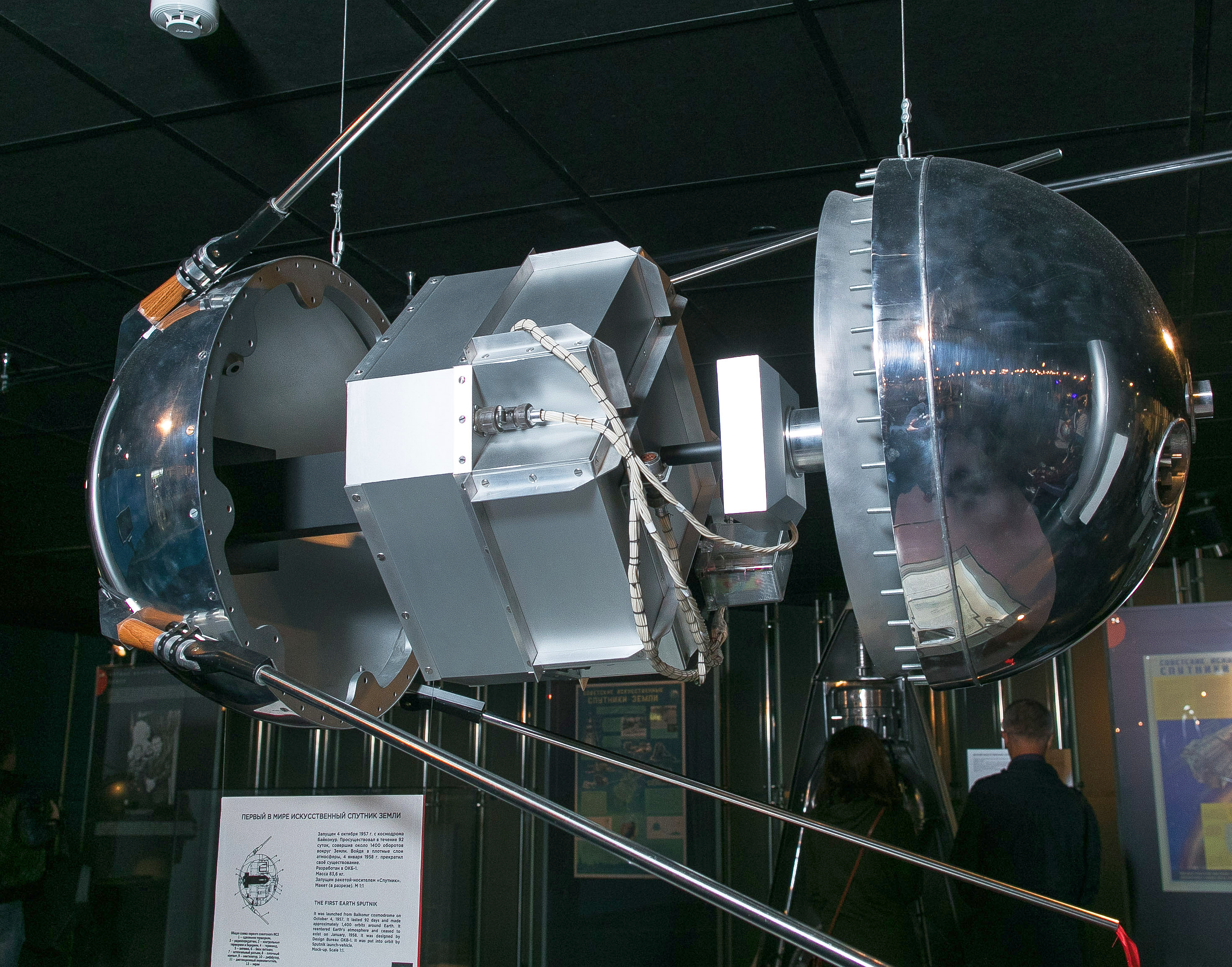
Exploded view of Sputnik 1

Sputnik 1 was designed to meet a set of guidelines and objectives such as:

- Simplicity and reliability that could be adapted to future projects
- A spherical body to help determine atmospheric density from its lifetime in orbit
- Radio equipment to facilitate tracking and to obtain data on radio waves propagation through the atmosphere
- Verification of the satellite's pressurisation scheme

The chief constructor of Sputnik 1 at OKB-1 was Mikhail S. Khomyakov. The satellite was a 585-millimetre (23.0 in) diameter sphere, assembled from two hemispheres that were hermetically sealed with O-rings and connected by 36 bolts. It had a mass of 83.6 kilograms (184 lb). The hemispheres were 2 mm thick, and were covered with a highly polished 1 mm-thick heat shield made of an aluminium–magnesium–titanium alloy, AMG6T. The satellite carried two pairs of antennas designed by the Antenna Laboratory of OKB-1, led by Mikhail V. Krayushkin. Each antenna was made up of two whip-like parts, 2.4 and 2.9 metres (7.9 and 9.5 ft) in length, and had an almost spherical radiation pattern.

The power supply, with a mass of 51 kg (112 lb), was in the shape of an octagonal nut with the radio transmitter in its hole. It consisted of three silver-zinc batteries, developed at the All-Union Research Institute of Power Sources (VNIIT) under the leadership of Nikolai S. Lidorenko. Two of these batteries powered the radio transmitter and one powered the temperature regulation system. The batteries had an expected lifetime of two weeks, and operated for 22 days. The power supply was turned on automatically at the moment of the satellite's separation from the second stage of the rocket.

The satellite had a one-watt, 3.5 kg (7.7 lb) radio transmitting unit inside, developed by Vyacheslav I. Lappo from NII-885, the Moscow Electronics Research Institute, that worked on two frequencies, 20.005 and 40.002 MHz. Signals on the first frequency were transmitted in 0.3 s pulses (near a frequency of 3 Hz) (under normal temperature and pressure conditions on board), with pauses of the same duration filled by pulses on the second frequency. Analysis of the radio signals was used to gather information about the electron density of the ionosphere. Temperature and pressure were encoded in the duration of radio beeps. A temperature regulation system contained a fan, a dual thermal switch, and a control thermal switch. If the temperature inside the satellite exceeded 36 °C (97 °F), the fan was turned on; when it fell below 20 °C (68 °F), the fan was turned off by the dual thermal switch. If the temperature exceeded 50 °C (122 °F) or fell below 0 °C (32 °F), another control thermal switch was activated, changing the duration of the radio signal pulses. Sputnik 1 was filled with dry nitrogen, pressurised to 1.3 atm (130 kPa). The satellite had a barometric switch, activated if the pressure inside the satellite fell below 130 kPa, which would have indicated failure of the pressure vessel or puncture by a meteor, and would have changed the duration of radio signal impulse.

While attached to the rocket, Sputnik 1 was protected by a cone-shaped payload fairing, with a height of 80 cm (31.5 in). The fairing separated from both Sputnik and the spent R-7 second stage at the same time as the satellite was ejected. Tests of the satellite were conducted at OKB-1 under the leadership of Oleg G. Ivanovsky.

== Launch and mission ==
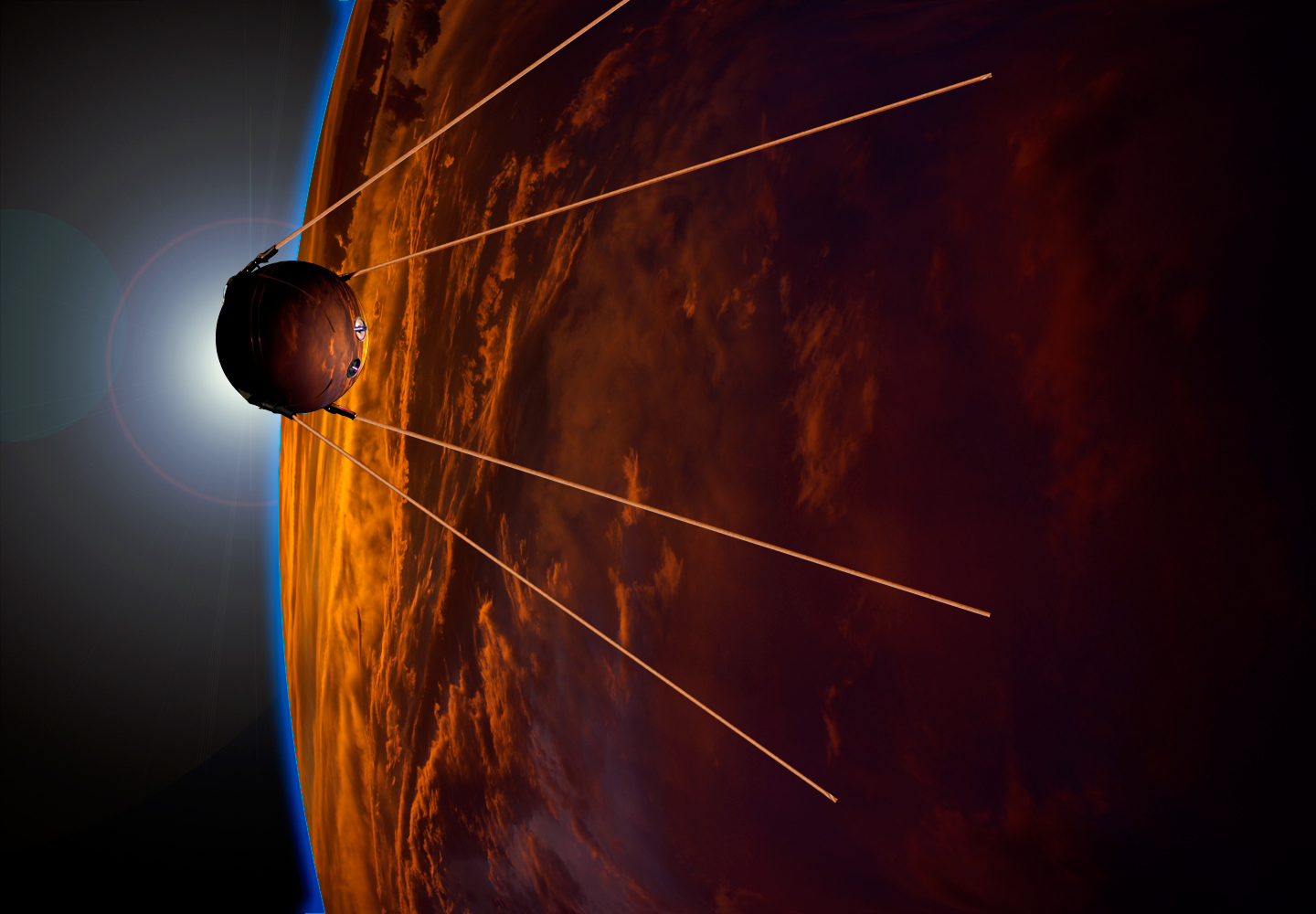
Artist's impression of Sputnik 1 in orbit

The control system of the Sputnik rocket was adjusted to an intended orbit of 223 by 1,450 km (139 by 901 mi), with an orbital period of 101.5 minutes. The trajectory had been calculated earlier by Georgi Grechko, using the USSR Academy of Sciences' mainframe computer.

The Sputnik rocket was launched on 4 October 1957 at 19:28:34 UTC (5 October at the launch site) from Site No.1 at NIIP-5. Telemetry indicated that the strap-ons separated 116 seconds into the flight and the core stage engine shut down 295.4 seconds into the flight. At shutdown, the 7.5-tonne core stage (with PS-1 attached) had attained an altitude of 223 km (139 mi) above sea level, a velocity of 7,780 m/s (25,500 ft/s), and a velocity vector inclination to the local horizon of 0 degrees 24 minutes. This resulted in an initial elliptical orbit of 223 km (139 mi) by 950 km (590 mi), with an apogee approximately 500 km (310 mi) lower than intended, and an inclination of 65.10° and a period of 96.20 minutes.

Several engines did not fire on time, almost aborting the mission. A fuel regulator in the booster also failed around 16 seconds into launch, which resulted in excessive RP-1 consumption for most of the powered flight and the engine thrust being 4% above nominal. Core stage cutoff was intended for T+296 seconds, but the premature propellant depletion caused thrust termination to occur one second earlier when a sensor detected overspeed of the empty RP-1 turbopump. There were 375 kg (827 lb) of LOX remaining at cutoff.

At 19.9 seconds after engine cut-off, PS-1 separated from the second stage and the satellite's transmitter was activated. These signals were detected at the IP-1 station by Junior Engineer-Lieutenant V.G. Borisov, where reception of Sputnik 1's "beep-beep-beep" tones confirmed the satellite's successful deployment. Reception lasted for two minutes, until PS-1 passed below the horizon. The Tral telemetry system on the R-7 core stage continued to transmit and was detected on its second orbit.

The designers, engineers, and technicians who developed the rocket and satellite watched the launch from the range. After the launch they drove to the mobile radio station to listen for signals from the satellite. They waited about 90 minutes to ensure that the satellite had made one orbit and was transmitting before Korolev called Soviet premier Nikita Khrushchev.

On the first orbit the Telegraph Agency of the Soviet Union (TASS) transmitted: "As result of great, intense work of scientific institutes and design bureaus the first artificial Earth satellite has been built". The R-7 core stage, with a mass of 7.5 tonnes and a length of 26 metres, also reached Earth orbit. It was a first magnitude object following behind the satellite and visible at night. Deployable reflective panels were placed on the booster in order to increase its visibility for tracking. A small highly polished sphere, the satellite was barely visible at sixth magnitude, and thus harder to follow optically. The batteries ran out on 26 October 1957, after the satellite completed 326 orbits.

The core stage of the R-7 remained in orbit for two months until 2 December 1957, while Sputnik 1 orbited for three months, until 4 January 1958, having completed 1,440 orbits of the Earth. It is presumed Sputnik 1 may have broken up above the western United States. A man in Encino, California, woke up on 8 December 1957 and noticed something glowing in his back yard. Upon inspection, it proved to be some small pieces of metal as well as plastic tubing of the type used in Sputnik. No one has been able to prove whether this in fact was part of the satellite.

== Reception ==
Sputnik 1's steady beep, which "both thrilled and terrified" listeners

Organised through the citizen science project Operation Moonwatch, teams of visual observers at 150 stations in the United States and other countries were alerted during the night to watch for the satellite at dawn and during the evening twilight as it passed overhead. The USSR requested amateur and professional radio operators to tape record the signal being transmitted from the satellite. One of the first observations of it outside of the Soviet Union was made at the school observatory in Rodewisch (Saxony).

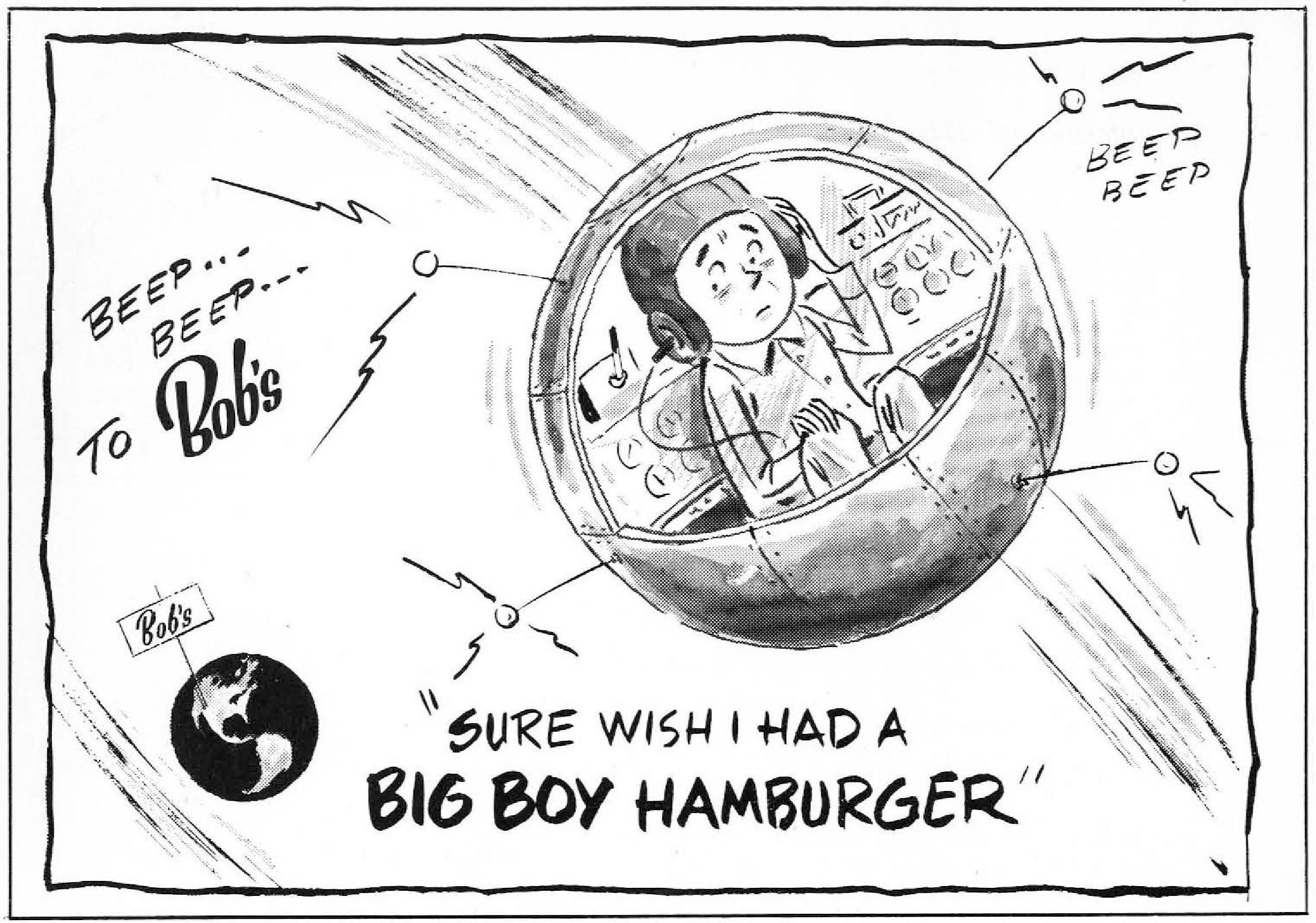
A Bob's Big Boy advertisement spoofs Sputnik, 1958

News reports at the time pointed out that "anyone possessing a short wave receiver can hear the new Russian earth satellite as it hurtles over this area of the globe." Directions, provided by the American Radio Relay League, were to "Tune in 20 megacycles sharply, by the time signals, given on that frequency. Then tune to slightly higher frequencies. The 'beep, beep' sound of the satellite can be heard each time it rounds the globe." The first recording of Sputnik 1's signal was made by RCA engineers near Riverhead, Long Island. They then drove the tape recording into Manhattan for broadcast to the public over NBC radio. However, as Sputnik rose higher over the East Coast, its signal was picked up by W2AEE, the ham radio station of Columbia University. Students working in the university's FM station, WKCR, made a tape of this, and were the first to rebroadcast the Sputnik signal to the American public (or whoever could receive the FM station).

The Soviet Union agreed to transmit on frequencies that worked with the United States' existing infrastructure, but later announced the lower frequencies. Asserting that the launch "did not come as a surprise", the White House refused to comment on any military aspects. On 5 October, the Naval Research Laboratory captured recordings of Sputnik 1 during four crossings over the United States. The USAF Cambridge Research Center collaborated with Bendix-Friez, Westinghouse Broadcasting, and the Smithsonian Astrophysical Observatory to obtain a video of Sputnik's rocket body crossing the pre-dawn sky of Baltimore, broadcast on 12 October by WBZ-TV in Boston.

The success of Sputnik 1 seemed to have changed minds around the world regarding a shift in power to the Soviets.

The USSR's launch of Sputnik 1 spurred the United States to create the Advanced Research Projects Agency (ARPA, later DARPA) in February 1958 to regain a technological lead.

In Britain, the media and population initially reacted with a mixture of fear for the future, but also amazement about human progress. Many newspapers and magazines heralded the arrival of the Space Age. However, when the USSR launched Sputnik 2, containing the dog Laika, the media narrative returned to one of anti-Communism and many people sent protests to the Soviet embassy and the RSPCA.

=== Propaganda ===
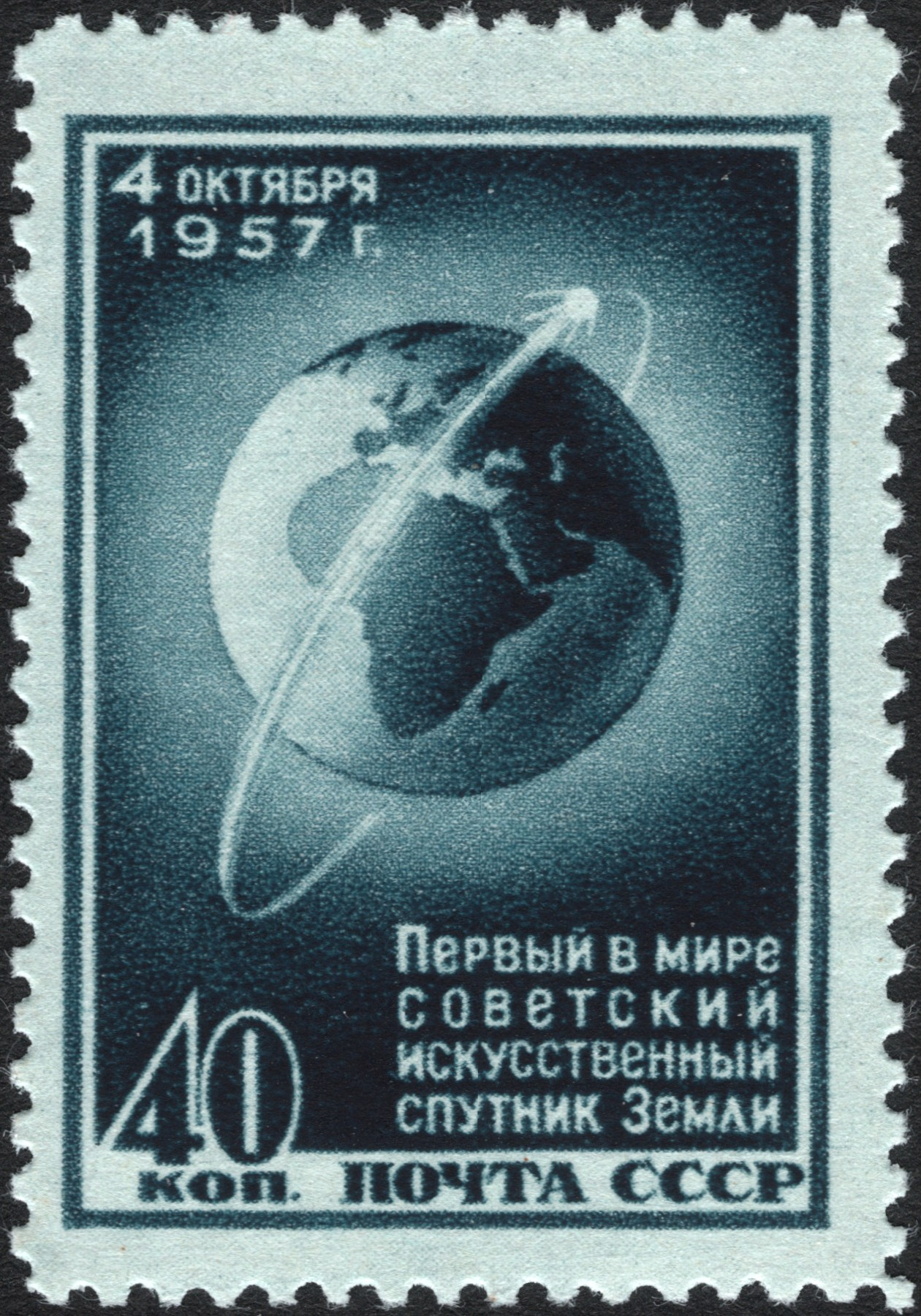
A Soviet 40 kopek stamp, showing the satellite's orbit

Sputnik 1 was not immediately used for Soviet propaganda. The Soviets had kept quiet about their earlier accomplishments in rocketry, fearing that it would lead to secrets being revealed and failures being exploited by the West. When the Soviets began using Sputnik in their propaganda, they emphasized pride in the achievement of Soviet technology, arguing that it demonstrated the Soviets' superiority over the West. People were encouraged to listen to Sputnik's signals on the radio and to look out for Sputnik in the night sky. While Sputnik itself had been highly polished, its small size made it barely visible to the naked eye. What most watchers actually saw was the much more visible 26-metre (85 foot) core stage of the R-7. Shortly after the launch of PS-1, Khrushchev pressed Korolev to launch another satellite to coincide with the 40th anniversary of the October Revolution, on 7 November 1957.

The launch of Sputnik 1 surprised the American public, and shattered the perception created by American propaganda of the United States as the technological superpower, and the Soviet Union as a backward country. Privately, however, the CIA and President Eisenhower were aware of progress being made by the Soviets on Sputnik from secret spy plane imagery. Together with the Jet Propulsion Laboratory (JPL), the Army Ballistic Missile Agency built Explorer 1, and launched it on 31 January 1958. Before work was completed, however, the Soviet Union launched a second satellite, Sputnik 2, on 3 November 1957. Meanwhile, the televised failure of Vanguard TV-3 on 6 December 1957 deepened American dismay over the country's position in the Space Race. The Americans took a more aggressive stance in the emerging space race, resulting in an emphasis on science and technological research, and reforms in many areas from the military to education systems. The federal government began investing in science, engineering, and mathematics at all levels of education. An advanced research group was assembled for military purposes. These research groups developed weapons such as ICBMs and missile defence systems, as well as spy satellites for the U.S.

== Legacy ==
Initially, U.S. President Dwight Eisenhower was not surprised by Sputnik 1. He had been forewarned of the R-7's capabilities by information derived from U-2 spy plane overflight photos, as well as signals and telemetry intercepts. General James M. Gavin wrote in 1958 that he had predicted to the Army Scientific Advisory Panel on 12 September 1957 that the Soviets would launch a satellite within 30 days, and that on 4 October he and Wernher von Braun had agreed that a launch was imminent. The Eisenhower administration's first response was low-key and almost dismissive. Eisenhower was even pleased that the USSR, not the U.S., would be the first to test the waters of the still-uncertain legal status of orbital satellite overflights. Eisenhower had suffered the Soviet protests and shoot-downs of Project Genetrix (Moby Dick) balloons and was concerned about the probability of a U-2 being shot down. To set a precedent for "freedom of space" before the launch of America's secret WS-117L spy satellites, the U.S. had launched Project Vanguard as its own "civilian" satellite entry for the International Geophysical Year. Eisenhower greatly underestimated the reaction of the American public, who were shocked by the launch of Sputnik and by the televised failure of the Vanguard Test Vehicle 3 launch attempt. The sense of anxiety was inflamed by Democratic politicians, who portrayed the United States as woefully behind. One of the many books that suddenly appeared for the lay-audience noted seven points of "impact" upon the nation: Western leadership, Western strategy and tactics, missile production, applied research, basic research, education, and democratic culture. As public and the government became interested in space and related science and technology, the phenomenon was sometimes dubbed the "Sputnik craze".

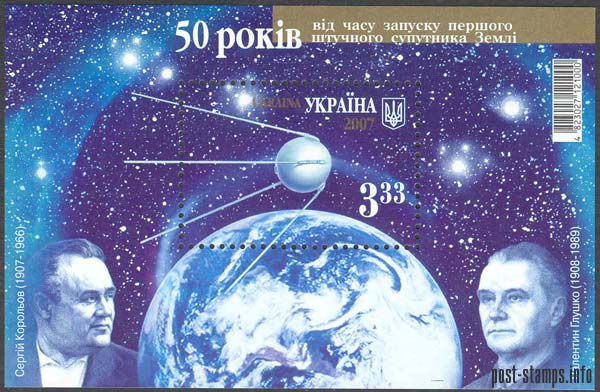
Sputnik 1, Sergei Korolev and Valentin Glushko on a 2007 Ukrainian stamp

The U.S. soon had a number of successful satellites, including Explorer 1, Project SCORE, and Courier 1B. However, public reaction to the Sputnik crisis spurred America to action in the Space Race, leading to the creation of both the Advanced Research Projects Agency (renamed the Defense Advanced Research Projects Agency, or DARPA, in 1972), and NASA (through the National Aeronautics and Space Act), as well as increased U.S. government spending on scientific research and education through the National Defense Education Act.

Sputnik also contributed directly to a new emphasis on science and technology in American schools. With a sense of urgency, Congress enacted the 1958 National Defense Education Act, which provided low-interest loans for college tuition to students majoring in mathematics and science. After the launch of Sputnik, a poll conducted and published by the University of Michigan showed that 26% of Americans surveyed thought that Russian sciences and engineering were superior to that of the United States. (A year later, however, that figure had dropped to 10% as the U.S. began launching its own satellites into space.)

One consequence of the Sputnik shock was the perception of a "missile gap". This became a dominant issue in the 1960 presidential campaign.

The Communist Party newspaper Pravda only printed a few paragraphs about Sputnik 1 on 4 October.

Sputnik also inspired a generation of engineers and scientists. Harrison Storms, the North American designer who was responsible for the X-15 rocket plane, and went on to head the effort to design the Apollo command and service module and Saturn V launch vehicle's second stage, was moved by the launch of Sputnik to think of space as being the next step for America. Astronauts Alan Shepard (who was the first American in space) and Deke Slayton later wrote of how the sight of Sputnik 1 passing overhead inspired them to their new careers.

The launch of Sputnik 1 led to the resurgence of the suffix -nik in the English language. The American writer Herb Caen was inspired to coin the term "beatnik" in an article about the Beat Generation in the San Francisco Chronicle on 2 April 1958.

The flag of Kaluga, featuring Sputnik 1

The flag of the Russian city of Kaluga (which, as Konstantin Tsiolkovsky's place of work and residency, is very dedicated to space and space travel) features a small Sputnik in the canton.

On 3 October 2007 Google celebrated Sputnik's 50th anniversary with a Google Doodle.

=== Satellite navigation ===
The launch of Sputnik also planted the seeds for the development of modern satellite navigation. Two American physicists, William Guier and George Weiffenbach, at Johns Hopkins University's Applied Physics Laboratory (APL) decided to monitor Sputnik's radio transmissions and within hours realized that, because of the Doppler effect, they could pinpoint where the satellite was along its orbit. The Director of the APL gave them access to their UNIVAC computer to do the then heavy calculations required.

Early the next year, Frank McClure, the deputy director of the APL, asked Guier and Weiffenbach to investigate the inverse problem: pinpointing the user's location, given the satellite's. At the time, the Navy was developing the submarine-launched Polaris missile, which required them to know the submarine's location. This led them and APL to develop the TRANSIT system, a forerunner of modern Global Positioning System (GPS) satellites.

== Surviving examples ==
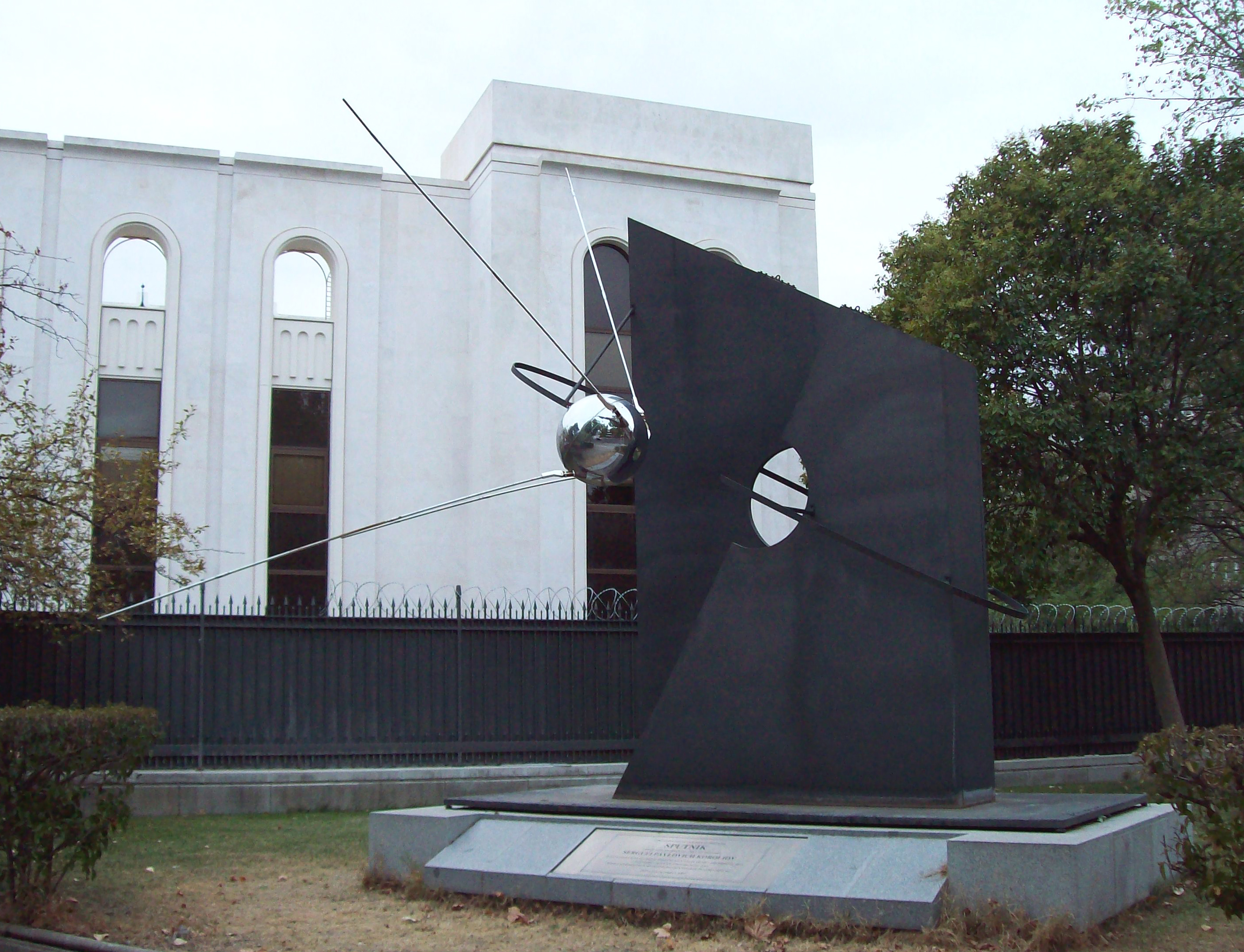
Sputnik replica in Spain

=== Backups ===
At least two vintage duplicates of Sputnik 1 exist, built apparently as backup units. The first resides near Moscow in the corporate museum of Energia, the modern descendant of Korolev's design bureau, where it is on display by appointment only. The second is a flight-ready backup at the Cosmosphere space museum in Hutchinson, Kansas, United States, which also has an engineering model of the Sputnik 2.

=== Models ===
The Museum of Flight in Seattle, United States has a Sputnik 1, but it has no internal components, though it does have casings and moulded fittings inside (as well as evidence of battery wear), which may be an engineering model. Authenticated by the Memorial Museum of Cosmonautics in Moscow, the unit was auctioned in 2001 and purchased by an anonymous private buyer, who donated it to the museum.

The Sputnik 1 EMC/EMI is a class of full-scale laboratory models of the satellite. The models, manufactured by OKB-1 and NII-885 (headed by Mikhail Ryazansky), were introduced on 15 February 1957. They were made to test ground electromagnetic compatibility (EMC) and electromagnetic interference (EMI).

=== Replicas ===
In 1959, the Soviet Union donated a replica of Sputnik to the United Nations. There are other full-size Sputnik replicas (with varying degrees of accuracy) on display in locations around the world, including the National Air and Space Museum in the United States, the Science Museum in the United Kingdom, the Powerhouse Museum in Australia, and outside the Russian embassy in Spain.

Three one-third scale student-built replicas of Sputnik 1 were deployed from the Mir space station between 1997 and 1999. The first, named Sputnik 40 to commemorate the 40th anniversary of the launch of Sputnik 1, was deployed in November 1997. Sputnik 41 was launched a year later, and Sputnik 99 was deployed in February 1999. A fourth replica was launched, but never deployed, and was destroyed when Mir was deorbited.

=== Private owners ===
Two more Sputniks are claimed to be in the personal collections of American entrepreneurs Richard Garriott and Jay S. Walker.

== See also ==
- Yuri Gagarin — Soviet cosmonaut and first human to journey into outer space
- Donald B. Gillies — one of the first to calculate the Sputnik 1 orbit
- Kerim Kerimov — one of the architects behind Sputnik 1
- Valentina Tereshkova — first woman in space
- ILLIAC I — first computer to calculate the orbit of Sputnik 1
- Science and technology in the Soviet Union
- Timeline of artificial satellites and space probes
- Timeline of Russian innovation

== Bibliography ==
- Ackmann, Martha (2004). The Mercury 13: The True Story of Thirteen Women and the Dream of Space Flight. New York: Random House. ISBN 978-0-375-75893-5.
- Bilstein, Roger E. (1980). Stages to Saturn: A Technological History of the Apollo/Saturn Launch Vehicles. Washington, DC: National Aeronautics and Space Administration. OCLC 5891638.
- Brzezinski, Matthew B. (2007). Red Moon Rising: Sputnik and the Hidden Rivalries That Ignited the Space Age. New York: Henry Holt and Co. ISBN 978-0-8050-8147-3.
- Burrows, William E. (2001). By Any Means Necessary: America's Secret Air War in the Cold War. New York: Farrar, Straus & Giroux. ISBN 978-0-374-11747-4.
- Cox, Donald; Stoiko, Michael (1958). Spacepower: What It Means To You. Philadelphia, PA: The John C. Winston Company. OCLC 2641757.
- Divine, Robert A. (1993). The Sputnik Challenge. New York: Oxford University Press. ISBN 978-0-19-505008-0.
- Golovanov, Yaroslav (1994). Королев: факты и мифы [Korolev: Facts and Myths] (in Russian). Moscow: Nauka. ISBN 978-5-02-000822-9.
- Gray, Mike (1992). Angle of Attack: Harrison Storms and the Race to the Moon. New York: W. W. Norton & Co. ISBN 978-0-393-01892-9.
- Green, Constance McLaughlin (1970). Vanguard: A History (PDF). NASA Historical Series. Washington, DC: National Aeronautics and Space Administration. OCLC 204635. SP-4202.
- Harford, James J. (1997). Korolev: How One Man Masterminded the Soviet Drive to Beat America to the Moon. New York: John Wiley & Sons. ISBN 978-0-471-14853-1.
- Lanius, Roger D.; Logsdon, John M.; Smith, Robert W. (2013). Reconsidering Sputnik: Forty Years Since the Soviet Satellite. London: Routledge. ISBN 978-1-134-96033-0.
- Lashmar, Paul (1996). Spy Flights of the Cold War. Annapolis, MD: U.S. Naval Institute Press. ISBN 978-1-55750-837-9.
- Lovell, Bernard (1968). The Story of Jodrell Bank. New York: Harper & Row. OCLC 439766.
- McDougall, Walter A. (1985). ...The Heavens and the Earth: A Political History of the Space Age. New York: Basic Books. ISBN 978-0-465-02887-0.
- Neal, Homer A.; Smith, Tobin L.; McCormick, Jennifer B. (2008). Beyond Sputnik: U.S. Science Policy in the Twenty-first Century. Ann Arbor: University of Michigan Press. ISBN 978-0-472-11441-2.
- Peebles, Curtis (1991). The Moby Dick Project: Reconnaissance Balloons Over Russia. Washington, DC: Smithsonian Institution Press. ISBN 978-1-56098-025-4.
- Peebles, Curtis (1997). The Corona Project: America's First Spy Satellites. Annapolis, MD: U.S. Naval Institute Press. ISBN 978-1-55750-688-7.
- Peebles, Curtis (2000). Shadow Flight: America's Secret Air War Against the Soviet Union. Novato, CA: Presideo Press. ISBN 978-0-89141-700-2.
- Prados, John (1982). The Soviet Estimate: U.S. Intelligence Analysis & Russian Military Strength. New York: Dial Press. ISBN 978-0-385-27211-7.
- Shepard, Alan B.; Slayton, Donald K. (1994). Moon Shot: The Inside Story of America's Race to the Moon. Atlanta, GA: Turner Publishing. ISBN 978-1-57036-167-8.
- Siddiqi, Asif A. (2003). Sputnik and the Soviet Space Challenge. Gainesville, FL: University of Florida Press. ISBN 978-0-8130-2627-5.
- Swenson, Loyd S.; Grimwood, James M.; Alexander, Charles C. (1966). This New Ocean: A History of Project Mercury. Washington, DC: National Aeronautics and Space Administration. OCLC 569889.
- Terry, Paul (2013), Top 10 Of Everything, Octopus Publishing Group Ltd 2013, ISBN 978-0-600-62887-3
- Zaloga, Steven J. (2002). The Kremlin's Nuclear Sword: The Rise and Fall of Russia's Strategic Nuclear Forces, 1945–2000. Washington, DC: Smithsonian Institution Press. ISBN 978-1-58834-007-8.
- Zhao, Yong (2009). Catching Up Or Leading the Way: American Education in the Age of Globalization. ASCD. ISBN 978-1-4166-0873-8.
