= Cardboard City (London) =

Informal settlement in United Kingdom

Coordinates: 51°30′18″N 0°6′49″W

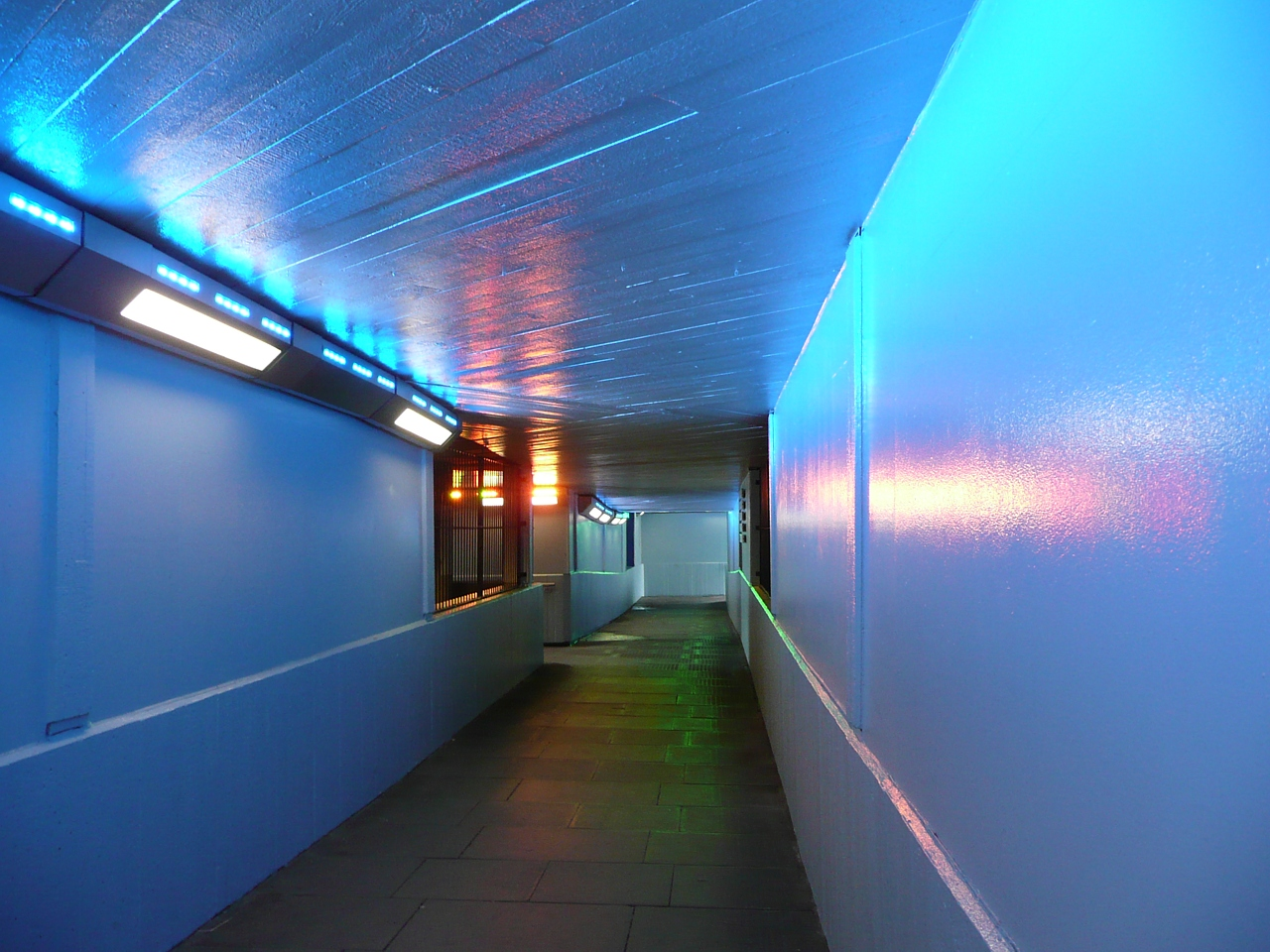
The underpass between Waterloo Bridge and the Bullring roundabout in 2009, previously the site of Cardboard City

Cardboard City was the name for an informal settlement consisting of temporary cardboard shelters that occupied a site near Waterloo station in London, England. Cardboard City was lived in by homeless people from around 1978 until 1998, and was eventually closed after a High Court order led to its redevelopment.

== History ==
Cardboard City was first occupied in 1978. In the mid-1980s the site, in the pedestrian underpasses under the Bullring roundabout near Waterloo station, was home to up to 200 people sleeping in cardboard boxes. By early 1998, fewer than 30 people remained there. These were officially evicted by the London Borough of Lambeth in February 1998, and forced to leave before the end of March 1998. All were offered free housing by the Borough, although there was concern as to whether the residents would be able to cope with housed life. The area is now the site of the BFI IMAX cinema.

== In popular culture ==
- The song "Cardboard Box City" by The Levellers (on their first album A Weapon Called the Word from 1990) is about this site and most people's ignorance about those living conditions.
- The song "Victoria Gardens" by Madness (on their 1984 album Keep Moving) refers directly to the plight of the homeless residents of Cardboard City.
- The song "Cardboard City" by Skyclad (on their 1997 album Prince of the Poverty Line) is about the residents of Cardboard City being marginalised.
- The anti-Thatcher song "Jangling Man" by Cleaners from Venus (Martin Newell) on his 1990 album The Number 13 addresses "all you kids in Cardboard City," and bitterly says he "hopes you're having fun."
- The main character of Rebuilding Coventry by Sue Townsend is described as living in Cardboard City for a time.
- The film Tax City was based on a true account of the Taxing Squad, a group of criminals who preyed on homeless people sleeping at Cardboard City.
- The documentary photography of artist Moyra Peralta featured the last days of Cardboard City and captured many of the realities of life in the underpasses of the Bullring. The book includes an introduction by renowned art critic John Berger.

== See also ==
- Cardboard city - Belgrade
