= Adrian Mole: From Minor to Major =

Compilation book by Sue Townsend

- First edition
- Author: Sue Townsend
- Cover artist: Caroline Holden
- Language: English
- Series: Adrian Mole series
- Genre: Young adult novel
- Publisher: Methuen
- Publication date: August 1991
- Publication place: United Kingdom
- Media type: Print (Hardback & Paperback)
- ISBN: 1-85152-426-6
- Preceded by: True Confessions of Adrian Albert Mole
- Followed by: Adrian Mole: The Wilderness Years

Adrian Mole: From Minor to Major is a compilation of the first three books The Secret Diary of Adrian Mole, Aged 13¾, The Growing Pains of Adrian Mole and True Confessions of Adrian Albert Mole. The book also contains the specially written bonus, Adrian Mole and the Small Amphibians (a reference to newts). It was first published in August 1991.
