= SWHS =

SWHS may refer to:

- South Wigston High School, a high school in Leicester, United Kingdom
- South Windsor High School, a high school in South Windsor, Connecticut, United States
- Star Wars Holiday Special, a 1978 television special featuring the cast and characters of Star Wars
- South Warren High School, a high school in Bowling Green, Kentucky, United States
