= Number Ten (novel) =

Novel by Sue Townsend

- First edition
- Author: Sue Townsend
- Illustrator: Sarah Gibb
- Language: English
- Publisher: Penguin Books
- Publication date: 2002
- Publication place: United Kingdom
- Media type: Print (Hardback & Paperback
- Pages: 324 pp
- ISBN: 978-0-14-027941-2
- OCLC: 52486255

Number Ten is a 2002 novel by Sue Townsend, about the prime minister of the United Kingdom (Edward Clare) attempting to take an incognito holiday with his bodyguard, Jack Sprat - in order to discover what the public truly thinks of him and his time in office - and the consequences that ensue for both men and their country. It is frequently satirical of then-Prime Minister Tony Blair, his family and his Cabinet.
