= The True Confessions of Adrian Albert Mole =

1989 book by Sue Townsend

The True Confessions of Adrian Albert Mole, Margaret Hilda Roberts and Susan Lilian Townsend
- First edition
- Author: Sue Townsend
- Language: English
- Series: Adrian Mole series
- Genre: Young adult novel
- Published: 31 August 1989 Methuen
- Publication place: United Kingdom
- Media type: Print (Hardback & Paperback)
- Pages: 112
- ISBN: 0-413-62450-1
- OCLC: 20133885
- Preceded by: The Growing Pains of Adrian Mole
- Followed by: Adrian Mole and the Small Amphibians

The True Confessions of Adrian Albert Mole, Margaret Hilda Roberts and Susan Lilian Townsend is the third book in the Adrian Mole series, written by Sue Townsend. It focuses on the worries and regrets of a teenage (supposed) intellectual. The title is long and often shortened to the more convenient The True Confessions of Adrian Albert Mole but the three names are part of the full title and represent fictional (or otherwise) actual content of the book.

The book covers the same themes as the first volumes although it differs in style from the other books. There are short collections of Adrian's classic diary entries covering important events over a brief period of a few days (such as Christmas, Adrian leaving home, Adrian's first job etc.) during the mid-1980s, but the continuous regular diary entries from the other books are absent.

There are also several longer transcripts of radio programmes on Pirate Radio Four, plus collections of letters and correspondence with characters from the earlier books, including Barry Kent, who is in prison. This format means that it covers a longer time span than any other Adrian Mole book at the expense of some detail.

The book also contains extracts from Sue Townsend's own diaries together with some of her essays, plus a collection of entries from an unknown teenage girl's diary written in the 1930s in Grantham. Townsend suggests that the girl was called Margaret Hilda Roberts and no one knows what became of her, although most readers will spot that this is a strong and bitter satire about Margaret Thatcher (Margaret Hilda Roberts was her maiden name). Townsend originally created this satire in the first few issues of the newspaper Today, as The Secret Diary of Margaret Hilda Roberts Aged 13 3/4.

The Adrian Mole section was subsequently published as part of the omnibus edition Adrian Mole: From Minor to Major.
