= Sputnik-1 EMC/EMI lab model =

Sputnik 1 EMC/EMI is a class of full-scale laboratory models of the Soviet Sputnik 1 satellite, made to test ground Electromagnetic Compatibility (EMC) and Electromagnetic Interference (EMI). The models, manufactured by OKB-1 and NII-885 (headed by Mikhail Ryazansky), were introduced on February 15, 1957.

== Sputnik 1 EMC/EMI Lab Model Number 001 ==
The first testing model Sputnik 1 EMC/EMI – Lab model 001, made on February 15, 1957, is located in Deutsches Technikmuseum Berlin, Germany. It comes from the former collections of Russian institute NII-885. The designer of Sputnik Dr. Mikhail Ryazansky was the director back then. In 2007, on the occasion of 50 years since the launch of the first artificial satellite project Sputnik 1, was this first test model exposed to the public in Deutsches Technikmuseum Berlin, Germany.

== Sputnik 1 EMC/EMI Lab Models Number 002 and 003 ==
- Sequence numbers of other test models Sputnik 1 EMC/EMI Lab model: 002, 003.
- Date of production: 1957.
- Producer: OKB-1 a NII-885 (the leader of the team: Dr. Mikhail Ryazansky).
- On July 20, 2016, a working Sputnik-1 EMC/EMI model, serial number 003, was sold at Bonhams in New York for US$269,000. It featured a still-operational transmitter and four antennas. Of four known Sputnik-1 test articles, this was the only one known to be functional.
- Serial numbers 002 a 003 are found in private collections, both models were auctioned off by Bonhams, New York.

== Two View Mockups Sputnik 1 ==
Apart from functional laboratory EMC/EMI models 001, 002 and 003 there are two view mockups, which do not contain any active radio or electronics.

Of four known models, two reside in private hands, one is located at the Energia Corporate Museum outside Moscow, and one, lacking internal components, is displayed at the Museum of Flight in Seattle, Washington, US.
