= Samuel Johnson: A Life =

2009 biography of Samuel Johnson by David Nokes

- Author: David Nokes
- Subject: Samuel Johnson
- Genre: Biography
- Publication date: October 27, 2009

Samuel Johnson: A Life is a prize-winning biography of 18th-century English lexicographer Samuel Johnson by British literary critic David Nokes. It was published on October 27, 2009, shortly before the author's death. Building on earlier work by scholars Robert DeMaria, Walter Jackson Bate, Lawrence Lipking and Peter Martin, many critics lauded Samuel Johnson: A Life as a significant step forward in Johnsonian biography and criticism. In the biography, Nokes challenges James Boswell's significance in Dr. Johnson's life, writing that "Johnson wished to keep...his acknowledged biographer at a distance" and even second-guessed his "annointment" of Boswell as his official biographer.

== Reception ==
Harold Bloom hailed Nokes's account of Johnson's life as significant for capturing "the critic as a Londoner, almost the archetypal citizen of that endless city." Jacob Appel praised the book for its "ability to convey the degree to which the intellectual life of eighteenth-century London arose from the overlapping and entangled lives of its participants."

Professor Nokes's obituary in The Times noted: His technique as a biographer was often to highlight the psychological aspects of his subjects’ life which may have been hidden in their public lives but which left their mark on their writings...Nokes was one of the few scholars to face head-on the possibility that Johnson married his wife Tetty for her money, remarking at a recent conference that Johnson was poor and ugly and so Tetty was an opportunity that he could not pass up.

However, the volume was not without its critics. Freya Johnston, writing in the Literary Review, observed of the biography: "David Nokes offers no fresh critical interpretations of Johnson; he treats Rasselas, a vigorous, bleak and witty road novel, as a problematic repository of its author's 'obsessions'. Given Johnson's hope that biography might instruct and appeal to everyone, it seems a pity to identify his works as - above all else - symptoms of an odd sensibility: it makes them less invitingly applicable to the rest of us."
