= Bride and Gloom =

Bride and Gloom may refer to:

- "Bride and Gloom" (Charmed), an episode of the TV series Charmed
- Bride and Gloom (film), a 1918 American short comedy film
- Bride and Gloom, a 1954 Popeye the Sailor film
