= Modern Science Fiction and the American Literary Community =

Book by Frederick Andrew Lerner

- Author: Frederick Andrew Lerner
- Language: English
- Subject: Science fiction; literary criticism
- Genre: Non-fiction; academic
- Publication date: 1985
- Publication place: United States
- Media type: Print

Modern Science Fiction and the American Literary Community is a book by Frederick Andrew Lerner published in 1985.

== Plot summary ==
Modern Science Fiction and the American Literary Community is an academic book containing notes accompanied by appendices and an index.

== Reception ==
Dave Langford reviewed Modern Science Fiction and the American Literary Community for White Dwarf #74, and stated that "it assembles endless bitty quotes and paraphrases of what people have said about SF, and reads like [notes] for an evaluative study which, unlike this, might reach some actual conclusions."

== Reviews ==
- Review by Robert A. Collins (1985) in Fantasy Review, September 1985
- Review by Tom Easton (1986) in Analog Science Fiction/Science Fact, March 1986
- Review by K. V. Bailey (1986) in Vector 131
- Review by Edward James (1986) in Foundation, #37 Autumn 1986
