= Bride and Groom (book) =

2018 novel written by Russian author, Alisa Ganieva

- First edition
- Author: Alisa Ganieva
- Translator: Carol Apollonio
- Language: Russian
- Genre: Fiction
- Publisher: ACT (Russian)
- Publication date: March 27, 2018
- Publication place: Russia

Bride and Groom is a novel written by contemporary Russian author Alisa Ganieva, in which two people struggle to get married amidst the chaos of family, religion, politics, and life itself. The translation was done by Carol Apollonio, who translated a previous novel by Ganieva.

== Publication ==
Bride and Groom was first published in 2015 in Russian with the title жених и невеста (zhenikh i nevesta) by Yelena Shubina publishing house, a child company of the large Russian publishing company AST. The English translation was published by Deep Vellum in 2018, the second of Ganieva's works to be translated into English by this publisher.

== Themes ==
- Challenging Tradition - Marat and Patya struggle to appease each of their traditionally-minded families while also trying to develop a modern romantic relationship, resulting in tension between the young couple and his or her respective families.
- Religious conflict - Ganieva uses religious tensions to highlight the corruption of society. Tensions between different conceptions of Islam and atheism all contribute to the chaos that surrounds Marat and Patya.
- Political Corruption - Russia's history, much like any other country, has its fair share of corrupt political figures and governmental failures. Ganieva communicates the fear of such events through the whisperings about the mysterious political figure Khalilbek.
- Fate and Destiny - The reader is led to believe that Marat and Patya are destined to be together and live happily ever after, but the contrast between this and what really happens reveals Ganieva's criticisms throughout the book.
- Sexism - Patya criticizes the domestic lifestyle to which the women around her are confined. It is made clear that a woman's reputation is fragile in the community of Dagestan, and Patya's internal dialogue acknowledges and despises this.

== Cultural significance ==
The cultural significance of this novel is deep in magnitude, especially with regard to tackling the ideas of traditionalism, race, gender, and religion in Dagestan, Russia.

=== Traditionalism ===
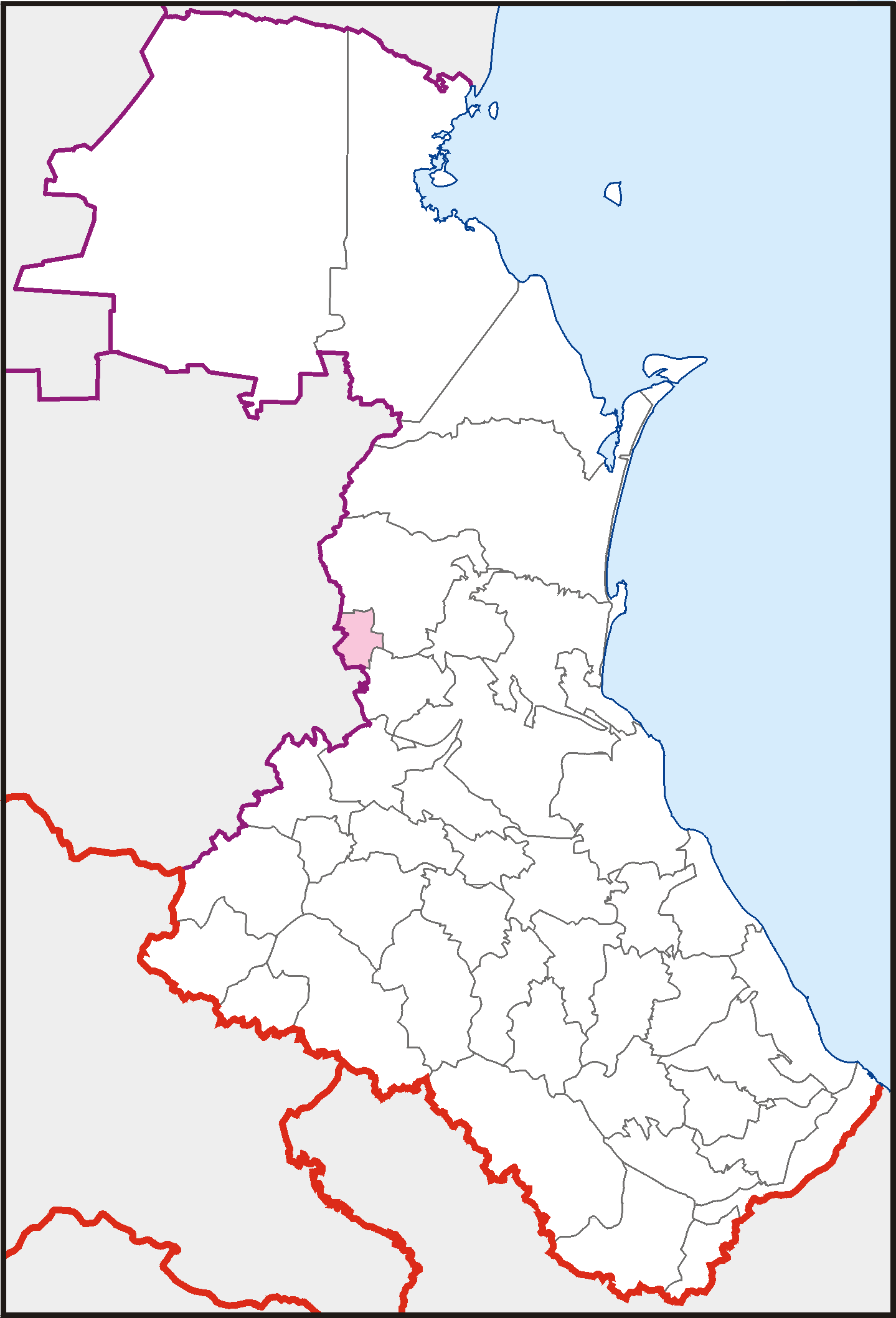
Dagestan, Russia

Traditionalism functions throughout the book, largely through marriage. Both main characters are expected to marry by their early to mid-twenties. This expectation is perpetuated by the families of both characters, as marriage by a certain age is part of their culture. Traditionalism is also included regarding the pangs and echoes of post-USSR Russia, where certain political opinions and ideas can put one in danger at times. Other times, these opinions create firm, divisive rifts between families and characters; Patya and Timur did not get along for this very reason. The whole political youth group Timur was part of would not disagree with him at all (besides Patya). They took what he said as fact, and fact alone. This powerful scenario creates a sense of dread that the youth of Russia could be indoctrinated in a sort of "Nazi Youth" type fashion, and again contributes to the tone of dread laced throughout the book.

=== Race ===
Ganieva tackles race in a subtle, interesting way throughout the book. Race plays a large role in who the main characters are permitted to marry, and is frequently noted throughout when mentioning potential candidates for marriage for both main characters. It is also highly sectionalized—Russia has many microcosms of culture throughout its nation along with three separate dialects, so the fact that race and traditionalism are still tied together in the beginning of this book by the parents of the main characters wanting them to marry within the family paints a disparaging pre-modern picture of Russia, akin to a place similar to the "wild west" where anything can go wrong at any minute.

=== Gender ===
In the context of women, Ganieva presents a prevalent sense of sexism throughout the book. The importance of sexism is present from the first pages of the book, as Patya is almost raped, and casually goes about her day. This is not reported, and she does not tell anyone. Another character who highlights this is Timur, who, through his conversations about politics with Patya, subtly proves to think he is smarter than her and needs to change the ideas in her head because she is a woman who does not really know better. Women are also considered less suitable if they do not have their virginity or already have kids, as this looks bad in the society presented in the book, and can lead to social isolation of sorts. Ganieva's awareness and criticism of sexism in Dagestan is apparent through her use of a male pseudonym to originally publish some of her works.

=== Religion ===
Although the novel is fictitious, the religious tension that appears throughout Bride and Groom is no fantasy. Most religious content of the book involves conflict between different sects of Islam. The majority of people in the North Caucasus region practice the Islamic faith. Muslims in Dagestan, like in many other places in the world, are involved in an ongoing debate regarding the proper practice of Islam and the identity of the modern Muslim. Dagestan is a region that struggles with Islamic radicalism, a fact that is prevalent in the lives of Marat, Patya, and the author herself.

== Synopsis ==
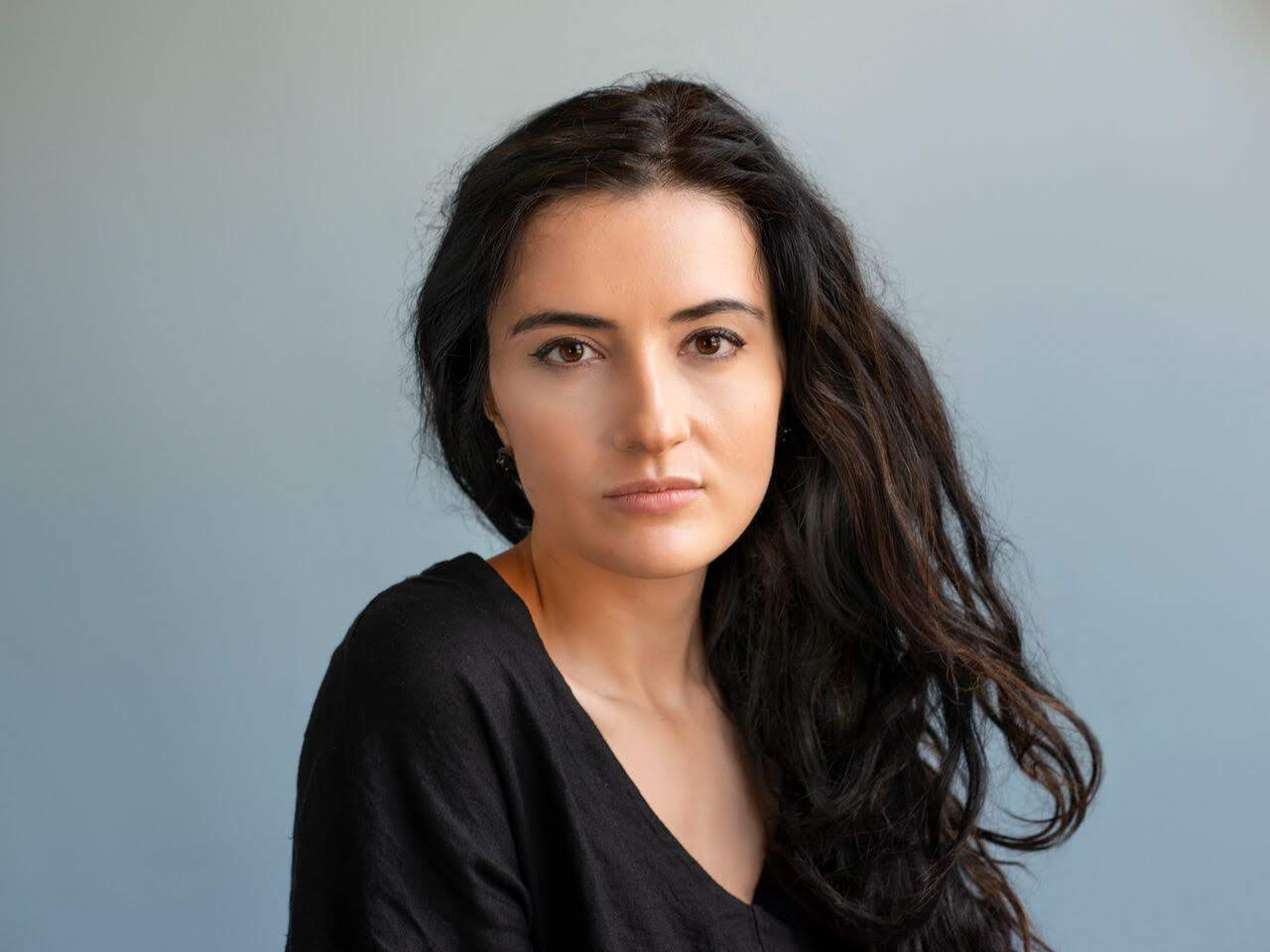
Alisa Ganieva, author of Bride and Groom

The novel begins by introducing the main characters, Marat and Patya, through a series of events within Dagestan, Russia. Marat is a human rights lawyer who is working on solving a murder case, and Patya is a 25-year-old woman who is worried that she will not be able to find a husband soon. Marat and Patya have similar families—both of which want them to find a spouse and get married as quickly as possible. Both families also observe the Islamic faith and share similar political beliefs, disliking what a central shady political character, Khalilbek, is doing within the government. Rumors and whispers of Khalilbek's wrongdoings pepper the community. Some, however, love Khalilbek, and claim he has done much for the community, disregarding the fact that he was in jail for the murder of a young man, who was run over by him in the middle of the night, for some reason. The people who love Khalilbek create a very dystopic idea of the society they live in, blindly and wholeheartedly embrace him without any doubt of character, making his status near godhood.

Marat and Patya meet at a concert which was supposed to celebrate his release- and both detest the concert. The two make an instant connection when they meet, and become romantic interests of one another. Marat attends a wedding at which an old lady cursed the attendants. While Marat's mother is continuously trying to set him up with a potential wife, Patya tries to sever ties with an unwanted suitor, namely the aggressive Timur. Marat's mother shows continual desire for Marat to get married, going to great lengths to encourage him. After attending a fortune teller session at the request of his mother, Marat stumbles across a scene in which an agnostic friend of his has been killed. He discusses this, among other things, with Patya at a diner. Word quickly spreads about the couple eating at the diner, and Marat's mother does not approve of the choice in partner Marat has made. Suddenly, Marat hears of a raid on his law firm, so he plans to travel to Moscow at his next opportunity to try to salvage any important work left untouched. After Patya refuses to marry Timur, who her mother suggests, she meets up with Marat before he leaves for Moscow. Marat asks her to be his wife to which she agrees. Patya's news was not received well with her family when she told them about the proposal. After leaving Patya, Marat met a stranger on the street who informed him of some of the reasonings behind Khalilbek's seemingly corrupt deeds among other things. Their conversation gives Marat new perspectives on the events of his life, and he felt his happiness become more pronounced. On the day of the wedding, Marat does not show up. Patya and her family are told that Marat has been taken by the police under the false accusation that he is a religious extremist. Patya leaves her house when nobody is watching and gets on a train headed for the shore. In the final scene, Marat is depicted to be beaten up in an interrogation room, slipping in and out of his real surroundings and a beachside conversation with Khalilbek.

== Critical reception ==
Reviews of the book were generally positive. Notable examples include a review from Viv Groskop of the Observer, in the Guardian, as well as a positive review from Emily D. Johnson in World Literature Today. Both articles focus primarily on the tone of the book. For instance, Groskop commented about how the tone feels generally clunky, but this uneasiness mirrors the characters' reality, where everyone speaks the same language but it is all mixed up in the chaos the author creates. Emily D. Johnson comments in the same way about the nature of the Russia the characters live in, deeming it a chaotic and unstable environment where anything can go wrong at any minute. Olga Zillerbourg, also with World Literature Today, provides a great summary which also mentions the dark tone of the book as well, mentioning various aspects of corruption.

Bride and Groom was adapted into a radio broadcast by Bethan Roberts on BBC Radio 4 in February 2018.

Bride and Groom is notable as the runner-up for 2015 Russian Booker Prize, inclusion in the Asian Review of Books' top books of 2018, and featured in a Russia Behind The Headlines list of top translated books of 2018.
