= The Growing Pains of Adrian Mole =

1984 book by Sue Townsend

- First edition
- Author: Sue Townsend
- Cover artist: Caroline Holden
- Language: English
- Series: Adrian Mole series
- Genre: Young adult novel
- Publisher: Puffin Books / Methuen
- Publication date: 2 August 1984
- Publication place: United Kingdom
- Media type: Print (Hardback & Paperback)
- Pages: 160
- ISBN: 0-413-53130-9
- OCLC: 59195255
- Preceded by: The Secret Diary of Adrian Mole, Aged 13¾
- Followed by: The True Confessions of Adrian Albert Mole

The Growing Pains of Adrian Mole is a novel in the form of a fictional diary by Sue Townsend. It is the second in the Adrian Mole series. It focuses on the worries and regrets of a teenage aspiring intellectual. The story takes place from 1982 to mid-1983. Prominent events in this volume are the breakup and later reconciliation of Adrian and Pandora, Adrian's attempt to run away from home and subsequent breakdown, the birth of his sister Rosie Mole, and Adrian's general worry about his O levels and nuclear war.

== Plot summary ==
Adrian Mole is an outsider who feels the reason he can't quite fit in with "regular" society is that he is an intellectual. Evidence from his diary entries include a precocious interest in literature, in left-wing politics, a desire to have his own poetry show on the BBC, his dislike of Margaret Thatcher and his frequent critiques of his less-refined schoolmates and family. Adrian's dysfunctional family, as in The Secret Diary of Adrian Mole, is one of the focal points of the book.

Although portrayed as somewhat vain and self-centred, Adrian is the only friend and frequent caretaker of the OAP Bert Baxter, and also shows a great deal of concern and compassion for the misfortunes of his parents and respect for the authority of his grandmother.

This book continues the theme from the first book of Adrian's growing frustration with his body. He constantly writes about the "spots" that mar his complexion, and he also has self-esteem issues about his height and physical maturity.

As his frustrations mount, Adrian decides to run away to London but then decides that would be the first place his parents would look and so runs away instead to Grimsby.

== Critical reception ==
Reviewing the book for The Financial Times, Martin Seymour-Smith wrote that it was "quite as classic" as its predecessor.
