= South Wigston High School =

Secondary school located in South Wigston, Leicester, UK

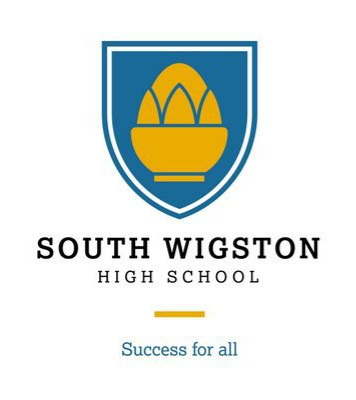

Location
- St. Thomas Road; South Wigston, Leicestershire, LE18 4TA; England; 52.5793°N 1.1389°W

Information
- Type: Academy
- Motto: Success for all
- Established: 1938
- Department for Education URN: 137931 Tables
- Ofsted: Reports
- Head teacher: Sara Fletcher
- Gender: Mixed
- Age: 11 to 16
- Enrolment: 839
- Website: http://southwigston.leics.sch.uk

South Wigston High School is a coeducational secondary school in Leicester, United Kingdom. It was founded in 1938 to serve the community of South Wigston. The school serves students aged 11 to 16, mainly receiving pupils from Glen Hills, Fairfield and Parkland primary schools. It also attracts pupils from many areas of the city of Leicester and the county of Leicestershire. The school has a purpose-built sports centre and several sport fields. It is part of the Learning without Limits Academy Trust.

Notable alumni include Sue Townsend (1946-1950), author; Louis Deacon (1991-1995), Rugby player for Leicester Tigers and England; and Brett Deacon (1992-1996), also a rugby player for Leicester Tigers and England.

In 2016, BBC2 produced a documentary entitled The Secret Life of Sue Townsend, Aged 68 ¾. Much of the documentary was filmed at the school, and current students participated.

In 2018 South Wigston High School's Progress 8 measure was positive at 0.06, which put the school in the top 50% of schools nationally for progress at GCSE level.

In 2019, the school attracted attention for its long-standing policy whereby pupils' mobile phones, which are prohibited in school, would be returned to their parents after a voluntary £2 contribution to charity.
