= Alisa Ganieva =

Russian author (born 1985)

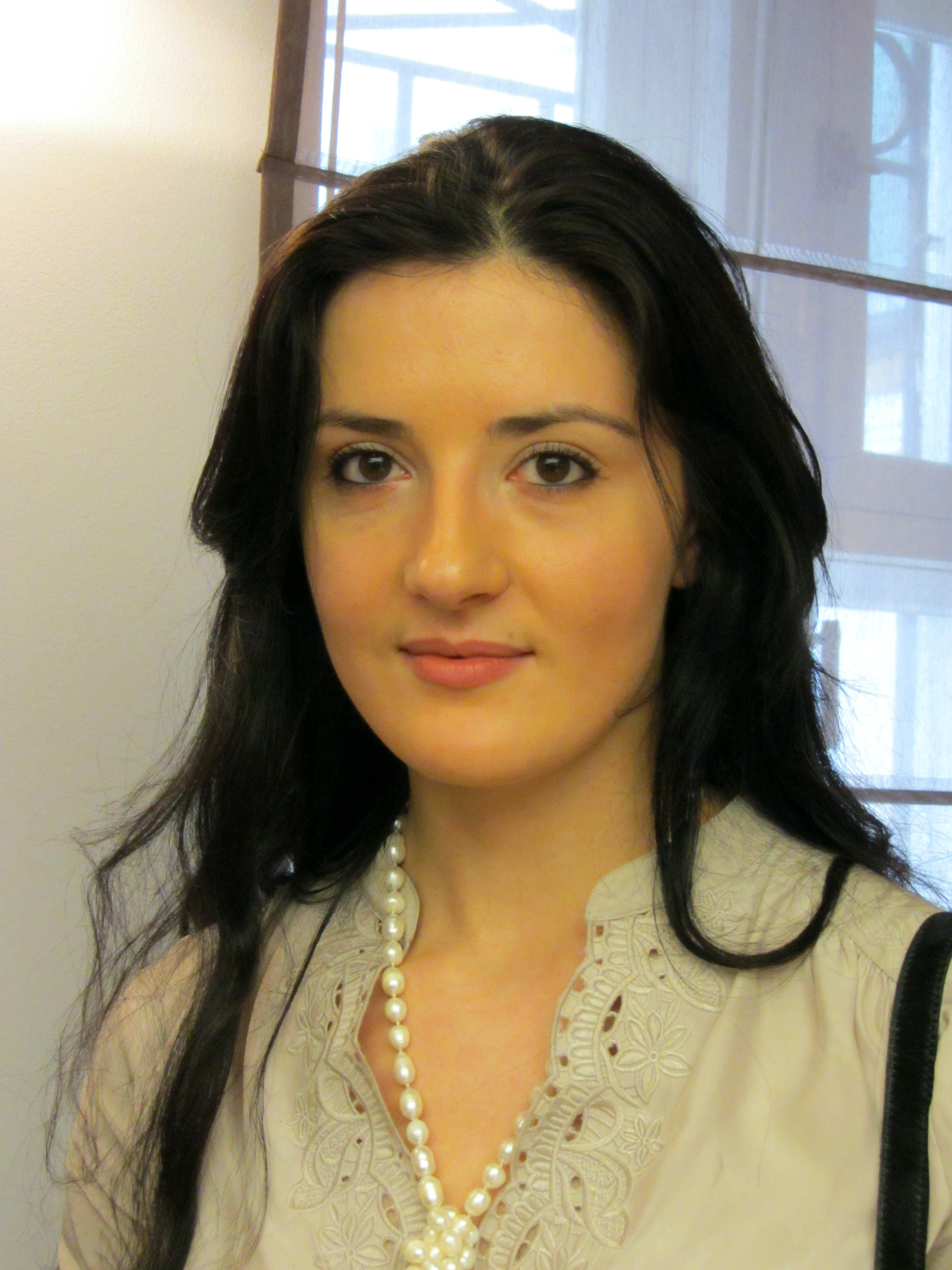
- Ganieva in 2012
- Born: Alisa Arkadyevna Ganieva; 1985 (age 40–41); Moscow, USSR
- Education: Maxim Gorky Literature Institute
- Occupations: writer, essayist
- Writing career
- Pen name: Gulla Khirachev
- Website: alisaganieva.com

Alisa Arkadyevna Ganieva (or Ganiyeva; Russian: Алиса Аркадьевна Ганиева, born 1985) is a Russian author, writing novels, short prose and essays.

== Life ==
Ganieva was born in Moscow in an Avar family but moved with her family to Dagestan, where she lived in Gunib and later attended school in Makhachkala. In 2002 she moved back to Moscow and graduated from the Maxim Gorky Literature Institute. She works as a literary critic for the Nezavisimaya Gazeta daily.

In 2009, she was awarded the Debut Prize for her debut novel Salaam, Dalgat!, published under the male pseudonym Gulla Khirachev. Her identity as the author was only discovered at the award ceremony. The novel describes the everyday life of Dagestani youth in the cities and shows the decay of traditional life and their difficult relations with Islam, the traditional religion of Dagestanis. The characters use the "Dagestani Russian", a pidgin version of Russian, to communicate, the first instance when this was presented in a literary work.

In 2012, Ganieva participated in the International Writing Program's Fall Residency at the University of Iowa in Iowa City, IA, and published her second novel, Holiday Mountain (Russian: Праздничная гора), also set in Dagestan. Ganieva spoke about the book to the audience of the London bureau of the Voice Of Russia radio. In 2014, the book was translated to German. In 2015 an Italian translation came out, along with an English translation which was published by Deep Vellum Publishing under the title The Mountain And The Wall. In 2016, Spanish and Turkish translations followed.

In April 2015, her novel Bride and Groom was released in Russia and listed for the major literary awards, such as the Russian Booker Prize, although it did not win.

Ganieva has also published short stories and fairy tales. She has received a number of literary awards for her fiction.

In June 2015, Ganieva was listed by The Guardian as one of the most talented and influential young people living in Moscow.
