= David Nokes =

British scholar (1948–2009)

David Nokes FRSL (11 March 1948 – 19 November 2009) was a scholar of 18th-century English literature known for his biographies of Jonathan Swift, John Gay, Jane Austen, and Samuel Johnson. He also penned screenplays, including a BBC adaptation of Samuel Richardson's novel Clarissa (1991) and an adaptation of Anne Brontë's novel The Tenant of Wildfell Hall (1996). He was also a leading reviewer for The Times Literary Supplement and the London Review of Books.

Nokes attended King's College School, Wimbledon, London. He received an MA from Christ's College, Cambridge in 1972 and a Ph.D. in 1974. He started teaching at King's College London in 1973, was elevated to reader in 1986, and was promoted to Professor of English Literature in 1998.

In 1994, he was elected a fellow of the Royal Society of Literature.

== Books ==
- Jonathan Swift: A Hypocrite Reversed (1985)
- Raillery and Rage: A Study of Eighteenth Century Satire (1987)
- John Gay: A Profession of Friendship (1995)
- Jane Austen: A Life (1997)
- The Nightingale Papers (2001)
- Samuel Johnson: A Life (2009)
