= Rebuilding Coventry =

1988 novel by Sue Townsend

- First edition
- Author: Sue Townsend
- Language: English
- Genre: Young adult novel
- Publisher: Methuen
- Publication date: 1988
- Publication place: United Kingdom
- Media type: Print (Hardback & Paperback)
- Pages: 155

Rebuilding Coventry is a 1988 novel written by Sue Townsend about a woman from the English Midlands who is accused of murdering her neighbour and goes on the run to London, and captures the zeitgeist of England in the 1980s.

The protagonist is a self-described beautiful woman with the unlikely name of Coventry Dakin who is thoroughly fed up with her life, generally for reasons of ennui. Her neighbour has been spreading rumours of an illicit affair and whilst the neighbour is strangling his wife, she rushes over to his house, hits him over the head with her son's Action Man and he falls down dead. Coventry then escapes to London and lives as a down-and-out on the streets of the capital, encountering a bizarre series of characters from across the social spectrum.

As the novel progresses, it becomes clear through the writing and the protagonist's musings that Coventry has allowed herself to fall into the quagmire that she finds herself in. This is quite typical of Sue Townsend's writing and has become a running theme through most of her novels; a rejection of predestination and that circumstance is governed by the choices of the individual. The novel is also a commentary on Thatcher's Britain and the hypocrisy of the middle and upper classes.

In a nod to Townsend's feminist beliefs, Coventry's actions stir feelings of independence in the other women who feature in the novel, emancipating some and causing rebellion in others. She is even able to help manipulate the diversion of four aeroplanes from Gatwick Airport in her quest for freedom at the highest levels of government.
