= Walter A. McDougall =

American historian (born 1946)

Walter Allan McDougall (born December 3, 1946, in Washington, D.C.) is an American historian, currently a professor of history and the Alloy-Ansin Professor of International Relations at the University of Pennsylvania.

McDougall graduated with a Bachelor of Arts degree from Amherst College and fought in Vietnam before completing his Ph.D. degree from the University of Chicago in 1974. He was a visiting scholar at the Hoover Institution, and a fellow at the Woodrow Wilson International Center for Scholars and the National Air and Space Museum of the Smithsonian Institution. He also received an Earhart Foundation Fellowship. He was a professor at the University of California, Berkeley for 13 years before moving to Pennsylvania. He is a senior fellow at the Foreign Policy Research Institute and also an editor of Orbis, the quarterly journal of world affairs published by the institute.

== Works ==
External videos
- Booknotes interview with McDougall on Promised Land, Crusader State, June 15, 1997, C-SPAN
- Presentation by McDougall on Promised Land, Crusader State, May 8, 1997, C-SPAN
- Presentation by McDougall on Freedom Just Around the Corner, May 13, 2004, C-SPAN
- Presentation by McDougall on Throes of Democracy, April 24, 2008, C-SPAN

McDougall is the author of many books on history. In 1986 he received the Pulitzer Prize for History for his 1985 book ...the Heavens and the Earth: A Political History of the Space Age, in which he examined the space programs and the politics of the US, Europe and the USSR, arguing that the Soviet Union made its way into space first because it was the world's first technocracy, which he defines as "the institutionalization of technological change for state purpose". He also examined the growth of a political economy of technology in the U.S. and the Soviet Union. In 2016, he published The Tragedy of U.S. Foreign Policy.

McDougall's first book was France's Rhineland Diplomacy, 1914–1924: The Last Bid for a Balance of Power in Europe (1978). In 1984 he co-edited The Grenada Papers. He also published Let the Sea Make a Noise: A History of the North Pacific from Magellan to MacArthur in 1993 and Promised Land, Crusader State: The American Encounter With the World Since 1776 in 1997. In 2004 he published Freedom Just Around the Corner: A New American History, 1585–1828, in which he described the United States as "the central event of the past four hundred years", showing that with their historically unequaled freedom Americans found various ways to satisfy both their good and bad desires. In 2008 he published Throes of Democracy: The American Civil War Era, 1829–1877, in which he covered all the major events and social forces of the Civil War era.

Walter A. McDougall was a brother of the Delta Kappa Epsilon fraternity (Sigma chapter) and a Vietnam veteran.

McDougall and his wife, the former Jonna Van Zanten have two children, Angela and Christopher, and reside in Bryn Mawr, Pennsylvania. His interests include books, music from J.S. Bach to Bob Dylan, chess, baseball, bridge, golf and C.S. Lewis.
