= ...The Heavens and the Earth =

1985 nonfiction book by Walter A. McDougall

...the Heavens and the Earth: A Political History of the Space Age
- Author: Walter A. McDougall
- Genre: History
- Published: 1985 (Basic Books)
- Publication place: US
- Pages: 584
- Awards: Pulitzer Prize for History
- ISBN: 978-1597401654

...the Heavens and the Earth: A Political History of the Space Age is a 1985 nonfiction book by American historian Walter A. McDougall, published by Basic Books. The book chronicles the politics of the Space Race, comparing the different approaches of the US and the USSR. ...the Heavens and the Earth was a finalist for the 1985 American Book Award and won the 1986 Pulitzer Prize for History.

The work highlights the role of Soviet space achievements in spurring the US into mounting its own space efforts to prove the superiority of the American political and economic system, while at the same time adopting the technocratic methods of the Soviet Union in order to do so. McDougall defines technocracy as the state funding and managing technological change for its own purposes. He finds that President Eisenhower took a skeptical point of view on the idea of adopting technocracy in the United States, as he opposed committing the nation to a lunar landing and stated that the progress of state managed technology had contributed to a dangerous military–industrial complex in his farewell address. Yet Eisenhower fought against the tide, because by the time he left office the federal research and development budget had increased by 131 percent over the last five years. Gradually the idea of state managed technological progress went from being considered a violation of local freedoms to an accepted part of the federal government's responsibility. McDougall makes clear that he did not view this in positive terms, as this perceived responsibility trampled the traditional American value of limited government.

Scholars have expressed disagreement with McDougall's perspective. Yet the amount of scholarly debate he generated illustrated his success in making a seminal contribution to the field of space history. NASA historian Roger Launius argues that this book is a "classic study in the arena of space policy history" and marked one of the key points in the maturation of spaceflight historiography upon its release in 1985.
